= Ladbroke Grove music scene =

Alternative music scene in London

The Ladbroke Grove scene was an alternative music and arts scene centred around Ladbroke Grove and Notting Hill in London, England from the 1960s until sometime around the 1980s. Initially the centre of the British Underground wing of the 1960s counterculture, by the mid-1970s it became a hotbed for British pub rock and punk rock, followed by post-punk, before fading out by the 1990s due to gentrification.

== History ==
=== Context ===
Following World War II, Notting Hill was characterised by decaying housing quickly converted into multi-occupation tenancies in response to an influx of Caribbean immigrants to the United Kingdom. The late 1950s saw the emergence of Teddy Boys in the area, followed by the 1958 Notting Hill race riots. The presence of the Caribbean community also led to a blossoming of semi-illegal 'blues parties' at which black youth danced to ska and bluebeat music, and later reggae.

=== Mid-1960s to mid-1970s ===
By the mid-1960s, Ladbroke Grove became a bohemian enclave, attracting writers, poets, artists, hippies, and freaks with its cheap housing stock, soon arguably becoming the British equivalent to San Francisco's Haight-Ashbury district. It thus became an important centre of the British Underground, especially through the London Free School, which was established there.

The British counterculture was galvanised by the International Poetry Incarnation poets' conference at the Royal Albert Hall on 11 June 1965, which featured Beat Generation poets such as Allen Ginsberg and Lawrence Ferlinghetti and attracted an audience of 7,000 people, nearing full capacity. By 1966, the counterculture was gravitating towards W11, the sprawl encompassing Notting Hill Gate, Ladbroke Grove, and Westbourne Park.

The London Free School was founded in March 1966 by Rhaune Laslett and John Hopkins and based at 26 Powis Terrace; it was an alternative adult education centre and community action group which also featured activists such as Joe Boyd, Brian Epstein, Michael X, and Peter Jenner. Though the School only lasted for a few months, it was the genesis of further initiatives, such as the Notting Hill Carnival. Also in 1966, Peter Jenner stepped away from his position as a lecturer at the London School of Economics to become a manager and began his association with Pink Floyd, involving them in the festivities surrounding the first Notting Hill Carnival and having them perform at All Saints Hall, where they would play several more times. Within months, Pink Floyd had become heavily acclaimed by the Underground.

Numerous other organisations associated with the British counterculture were active in the Ladbroke Grove area, such as the Underground newspaper International Times, which launched at the Roundhouse in October 1966 with Pink Floyd performing.

Ladbroke Grove's rise as a countercultural centre attracted numerous musical artists to the area, including the likes of The Deviants, Tyrannosaurus Rex, Third Ear Band, Quintessence, High Tide, Mighty Baby, Steamhammer, black artists such as Ginger Johnson & His African Messengers and Ram John Holder, and so-called community bands such as Hawkwind, Pink Fairies, and Edgar Broughton Band. It was the community bands which became the most synonymous with the Ladbroke Grove scene of this era.

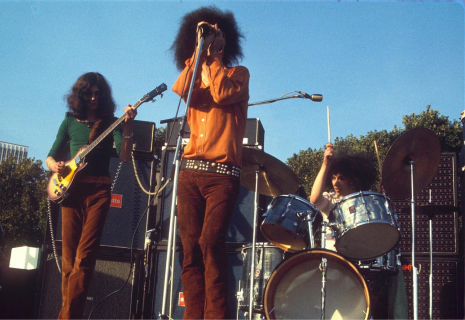
The Deviants established the Ladbroke Grove music scene in the late 1960s.

The music scene was established by Mick Farren's band the Social Deviants, later shortened to the Deviants. Due to a lack of interest from established record labels, the Deviants' first album, Ptooff! (1968), was distributed via mail order advertisements in the Underground press and head shops. Farren was already deeply immersed in the British counterculture, as he had been a doorman at the Underground UFO Club in Tottenham Court Road (initially set up to fund the London Free School), during which time he regularly contributed to International Times, gaining editorial control over the paper by the end of the decade.

Mighty Baby were formed by former members of mod group the Action, coinciding with them moving into Ladbroke Grove. They played a Legalise Cannabis benefit concert at All Saints Hall with Alexis Korner and the Third Ear Band. By the 1970s, the band became committed to Sufism. The Edgar Broughton Band signed with EMI in early 1969, moving to London from their hometown, Warwick; they initially lived in Colville Terrace and were based in Ladbroke Grove, jamming at Thursday sessions at the close-by All Saints Hall and socialising with the Deviants and the Pink Fairies. Inspired by Frank Zappa and Captain Beefheart, their heavy, political blues rock soon made them popular with the Underground.

In autumn 1969, Mick Farren was removed from the Deviants, whilst the other members added Twink to the lineup and renamed themselves the Pink Fairies. Over the next several years, the Pink Fairies performed at many festivals and benefit gigs, often for free outside the main grounds. The first notable performance of this sort was at the Bath Festival of Blues and Progressive Music in June 1970.

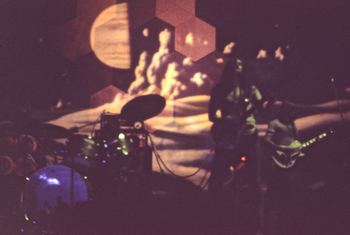
Hawkwind were one of the Ladbroke Grove 'community bands' and one of the artists most strongly associated with the scene.

Hawkwind played their first concert at All Saints Hall in August 1969, under the name Group X. Pink Fairies and Hawkwind would establish themselves at the centre of the Ladbroke Grove 'freak' community, over the next several years often sharing the same bill and jamming together live.

By the end of the 1960s, the original British Underground scene was in decline, with key venues such as the UFO Club and Middle Earth now defunct and the Underground press facing the realities of running a business against a backdrop of the co-optation of the counterculture. However, countercultural values had been assimilated by a new generation, whilst record companies founded specialist progressive labels, arts labs and club nights were established across the United Kingdom (including a college circuit), and rock festivals grew.

In July 1970, the Pink Fairies performed at the Phun City festival, which also featured other Ladbroke Grove scene bands such as Edgar Broughton Band, Mighty Baby, The Pretty Things, Shagrat, and Noir, as well as Detroit's MC5, playing their first concert in the United Kingdom. In August 1970, the Isle of Wight Festival took place, featuring stars such as Jimi Hendrix, The Doors, and The Who. Hawkwind and the Pink Fairies protested the high admission charges by performing outside the main festival grounds, in a large tent dubbed 'Canvas City.' July 1970 had also seen the opening of the Westway motorway near what is now Portobello Green, bisecting Ladbroke Grove and Portobello Road. Soon after its construction, the Pink Fairies and Hawkwind held a jam session underneath its arches until being removed by the police.

For Hawkwind, the events surrounding the Isle of Wight Festival and their performance at the Pilton Pop, Folk & Blues Festival in September 1970 (the precursor to the first Glastonbury Free Festival, held the following year), enhanced their credibility in the Underground. However, it was the free concerts they played around Ladbroke Grove that truly established them as a community band. Among these was as part of the 1970 Notting Hill Carnival, where they played in front of Wormwood Scrubs, a performance which came to be known as 'Wormstock.'

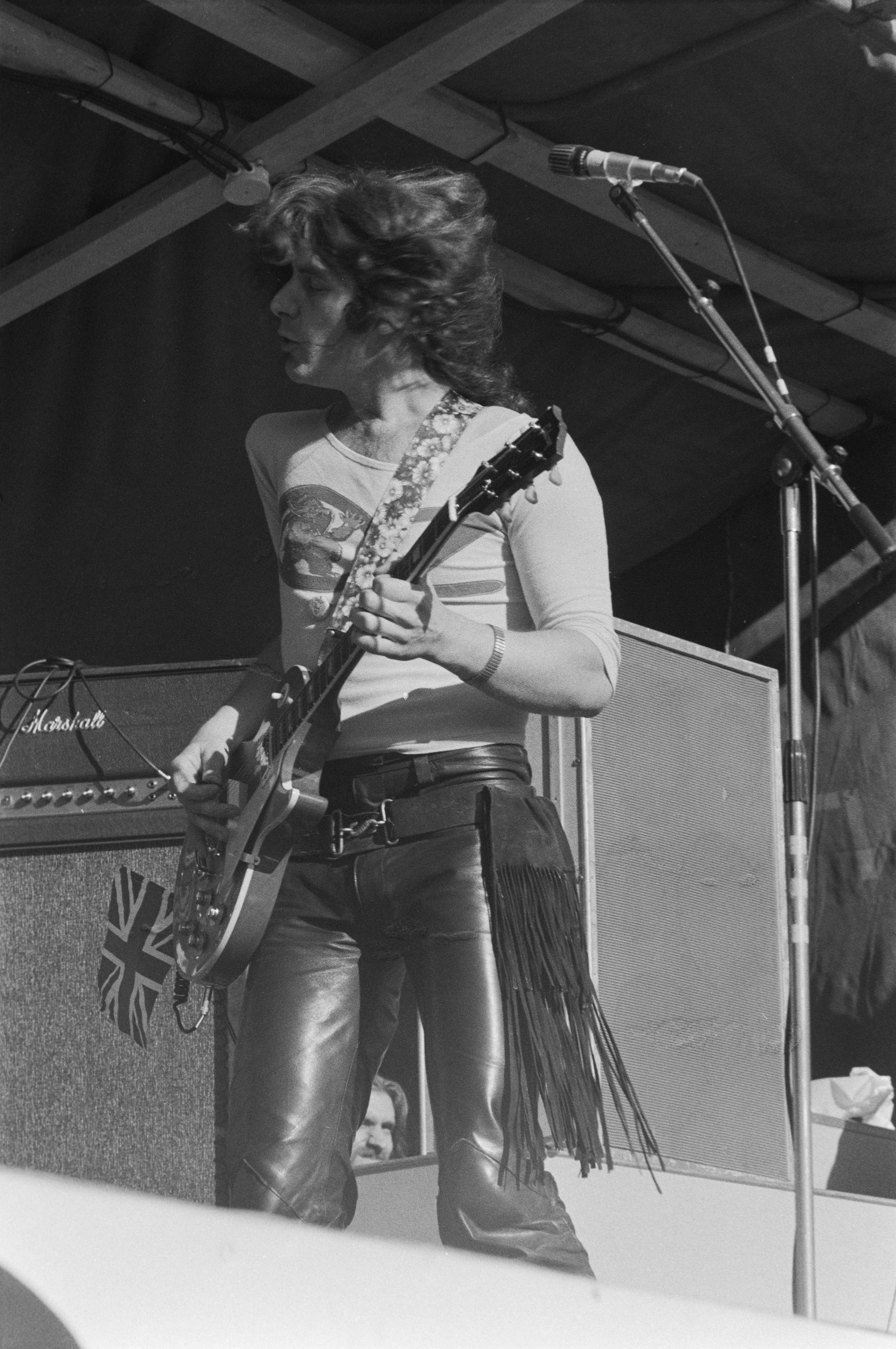
The Pink Fairies were another high-profile Ladbroke Grove community band.

In the summer of 1972, a personnel change took place within the ranks of the Pink Fairies, as original guitarist Paul Rudolph was replaced by Larry Wallis. Though the Pink Fairies' third album, Kings of Oblivion (1973), was characterised by a more commercial feel than their previous work, it failed to break them through into the mainstream. By contrast, Hawkwind's 'Silver Machine' reached the Top 10 of the singles chart in the summer of 1972, followed by the acclaimed live album Space Ritual in 1973.

By this time, the British Underground had begun declining, in big part due to constant police harassment. This era saw high-profile obscenity trials, such as those directed against Oz magazine in 1971 and Mick Farren's Nasty Tales comic in 1973. The period also coincided with the rise of glam rock. The Pink Fairies decided to disband in 1974, playing a farewell show with Hawkwind at the Roundhouse in February 1975. Whilst Hawkwind failed to match the success of 'Silver Machine,' they released a series of acclaimed albums between 1970 and 1975.

=== Mid-1970s to mid-1980s ===
In the mid-1970s, Ladbroke Grove developed a foundational pub rock and then punk rock scene. Pub rock emerged on the London music scene by 1975, centred around venues such as the Nashville in West Kensington, the Brecknock in Camden Town, and the Greyhound in the Fulham Palace Road. Ladbroke Grove was home to a venue called the Elgin, where the pub rock band The 101ers held a residency in 1975, starting that spring; they were fronted by Joe Strummer, who would later join the influential punk band The Clash. The 101ers were originally called the 101 All Stars after the address of their squat in 101 Walterton Road and had debuted live in September 1974.

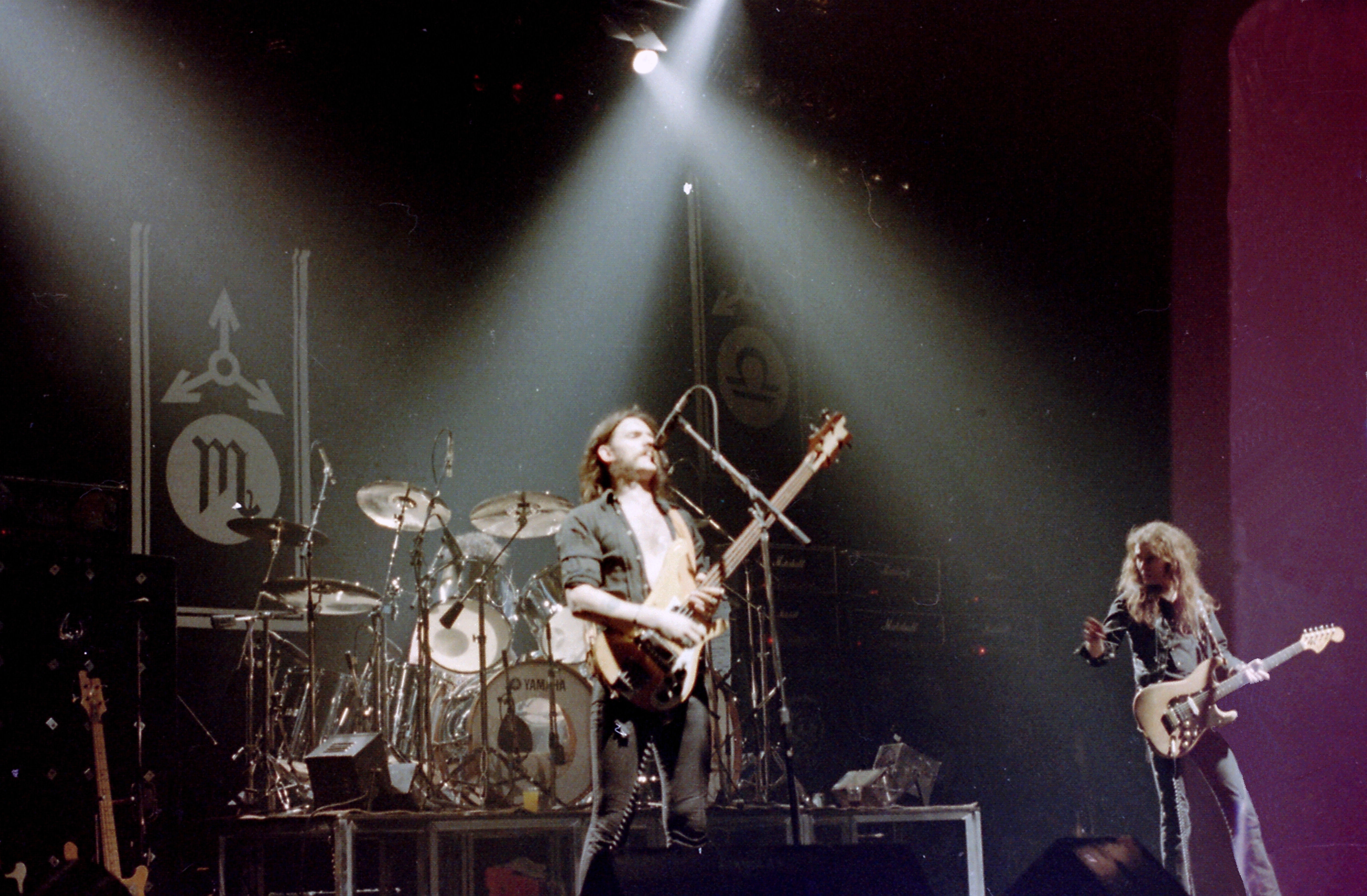
Motörhead originally consisted of former members of Hawkwind and the Pink Fairies.

1975 also saw the formation of Motörhead. Hawkwind's bassist, Lemmy, was fired during the band's tour of North America after he was found to be in possession of amphetamine whilst crossing the border between the United States and Canada; he was replaced by original Pink Fairies guitarist Paul Rudolph. Lemmy was then persuaded by Lucas Fox to start a new band, and thus Motörhead were formed in Ladbroke Grove. Paul Rudolph's successor in the Pink Fairies, Larry Wallis, was also recruited. Motörhead played their first gig in July 1975, supporting Greenslade at the Roundhouse, a week after the Pink Fairies played another farewell show there, with Larry Wallis playing both.

The Ladbroke Grove punk scene was beginning to take shape by August 1975, when Mick Jones and Tony James - then of the band London SS - met Bernard Rhodes, an associate of Malcolm McLaren, who was managing the Sex Pistols, at a Deaf School concert at the Nashville; Rhodes agreed to manage them. Towards the end of 1975, they were joined by Brian James, who had been in a Pink Fairies-style band with Ladbroke Grove scene connections called Bastard.

In September 1975, Motörhead began recording what was intended to be their first album, completing it between December 1975 and February 1976. However, this period saw the departure of Lucas Fox; in his autobiography, Lemmy connects this to Fox's amphetamine use. He was replaced by Phil Taylor. This period also coincided with the reformation of the Pink Fairies, with Larry Wallis now dividing his time between the two bands, which contributed to his departure soon after, alongside the toll of amphetamine use. He was replaced by "Fast" Eddie Clarke, completing what is considered the classic Motörhead lineup.

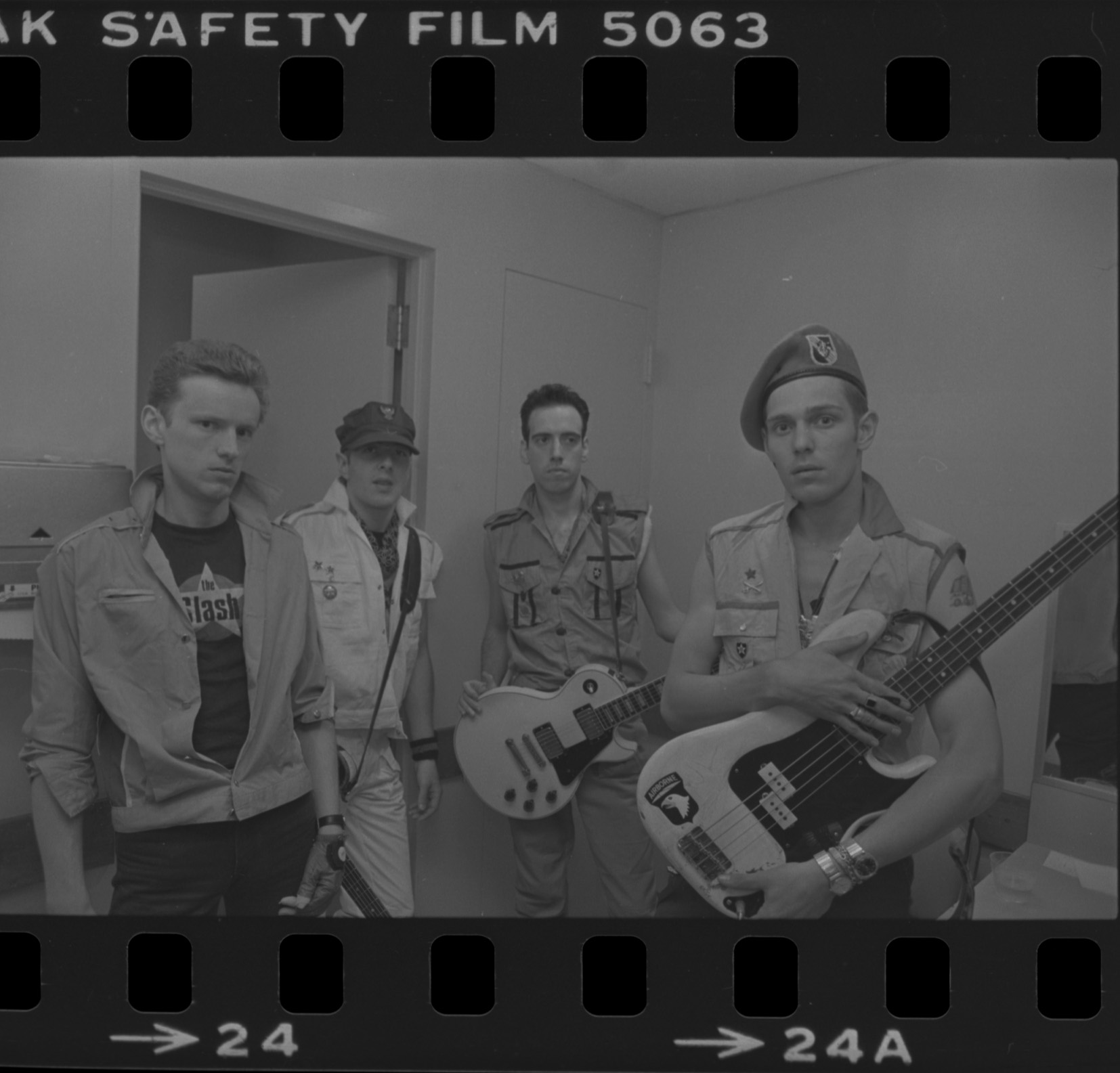
The Clash remained a Ladbroke Grove scene band for most of their career.

Early 1976 also saw Brian James depart from London SS to form the Damned with Rat Scabies after the latter's bid for London SS membership was rejected by Mick Jones and Tony James. Soon after, Tony James left as well, joining Chelsea and later co-founding Generation X with Billy Idol. Keith Levene, Terry Chimes, and Paul Simonon were now brought onboard London SS, beginning the band's transformation into the Clash. In mid-1976, Mick Jones and Paul Simonon approached Joe Strummer and propositioned him to join the band; Strummer agreed, completing the lineup. In April, the 101ers had been supported by the Sex Pistols at the Nashville Rooms; Strummer's exposure to the Sex Pistols led him to become disillusioned with the 101ers and the pub rock genre altogether.

In 1976, the streets around Portobello Road and Ladbroke Grove were still rundown, and the area housed numerous squats, particularly in Colville Gardens in Powis Square.

From the late 1970s on, the Clash, Motörhead, and Killing Joke all rehearsed at Ear Studios in the People's Hall in Frestonia near Latimer Road. Ear Studios was a cheap and basic rehearsal facility and was particularly significant for the Ladbroke Grove scene before the scene's decline in the 1990s.

Killing Joke were formed in late 1978 and early 1979, moving into a squat in Elgin Crescent by September of the latter year and working out their early live set at Ear Studios. They started their own label, Malicious Damage, and used it to release their first EP, Turn to Red, leading to support from John Peel and a recording session for his radio programme. They were then signed by Island Records and entered the London club circuit in late 1979.

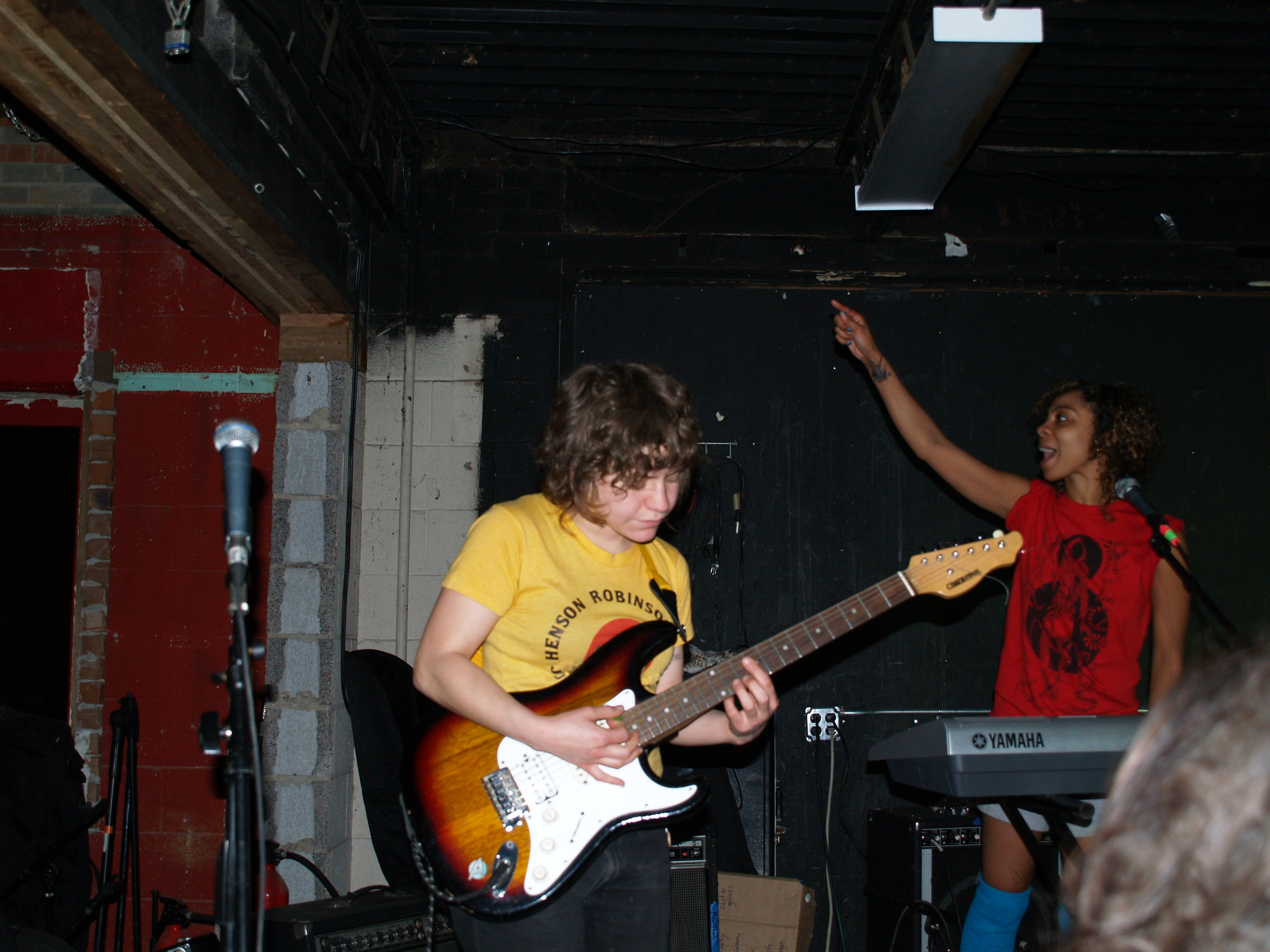
The Slits were based around Ladbroke Grove during the post-punk era.

Ladbroke Grove and its surrounding neighbourhoods were central during the post-punk era. According to music critic Simon Reynolds, the area transitioned from psychedelia to the post-punk period 'seamlessly,' the latter being 'effectively the glorious last blast of the counterculture.'

Other artists based around Ladbroke Grove at this time included the Slits, Aswad, and Vivien Goldman. The Ladbroke Grove scene of this period found punk rock, reggae, and free improvisation musicians socialising and playing together and the lines between journalists and musicians were blurred.

Mick Farren relocated to New York City in 1979. Steve Peregrin Took, formerly of Tyrannosaurus Rex, died in 1980.

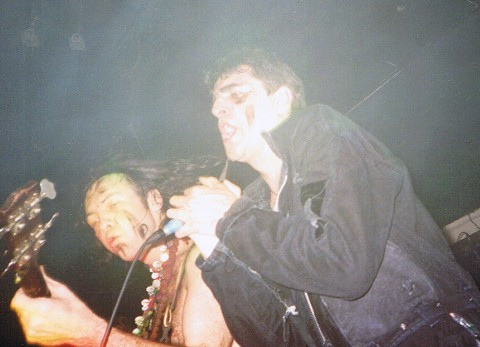
Killing Joke were part of the Ladbroke Grove scene until most of the band relocated to Iceland in 1982.

In 1982, much of Killing Joke's lineup relocated to Iceland, leaving bassist Youth behind in Ladbroke Grove. Youth began forming another band, which he called Brilliant, and which initially featured Paul Ferguson before the latter also left for Iceland. The lineup included Stefan Holjweck, Marcus Myers, and former Cure drummer Andy Anderson. They released the 45" single "That's What Good Friends Are For..."/"Push" before relocating to Wandsworth in December 1982.

Joe Strummer bought a house on Lancaster Road in 1983, after numerous years of squatting.

=== Decline ===
By the 1990s, Ladbroke Grove was undergoing significant gentrification, with the values of formerly cheap properties drastically rising and older residents being displaced.

== Compilation albums ==
The compilation albums Cries from the Midnight Circus: Ladbroke Grove 1967-1978 (2007, Castle) and Deviation Street: High Times in Ladbroke Grove 1967-1975 (2023, Grapefruit) are dedicated to the Ladbroke Grove scene.
