= What a Bunch of Sweeties =

Studio album by Pink Fairies
- Released: July 1972
- Recorded: 1972
- Length: 46:38
- Label: Polydor
- Producer: Pink Fairies

Pink Fairies chronology
| Never Never Land (1971) | What a Bunch of Sweeties (1972) | Kings of Oblivion (1973) |

Professional ratings
Review scores
| Source | Rating |
|---|---|
| Allmusic | 2.5/5 stars |

What a Bunch of Sweeties is a 1972 album by the UK underground group Pink Fairies.

== History ==
Twink had left the band before the recording of this album. Former The Move guitarist Trevor Burton occasionally joined the band for gigs and contributes to a couple of tracks, otherwise the band is the same line up stranded in San Francisco as The Deviants in 1969 after they sacked vocalist Mick Farren.

The sleeve came in a gatefold cover by Edward Barker, the front showing a box full of goodies mostly taken from roadie Boss Goodman's personal collection of underground badges etc., the inner gatefold a cartoon strip.

The lyrics for "The Pigs of Uranus" are taken from a Gilbert Shelton comic strip Wonder Warthog versus the Pigs from Uranus. "Walk Don't Run" is a cover of The Ventures song, and there is a cover version of The Beatles' "I Saw Her Standing There". "Marilyn" features a drum solo. A single from the album "I Saw Her Standing There/Pigs of Uranus" was released in Germany with a picture sleeve of an earlier version of the group.

Before its release, singer/guitarist Paul Rudolph left the band, briefly causing its deactivation. Bassist Duncan Sanderson and drummer Russell Hunter formed a new band with singer (and ex Tyrannosaurus Rex percussionist) Steve Peregrin Took and guitarist Mick Wayne (ex Junior's Eyes). After one abortive recording session at Olympic Studios, Wayne, Sanderson and Hunter split from Took and formed a new version of the Pink Fairies for an unsuccessful tour and a single "Well Well Well/Hold On" and also a Radio 1 session, before replacing Wayne with Larry Wallis (formerly of Took's 1970 band Shagrat). Rudolph's departure was generally viewed as a disaster brought about by disparate drug habits and visa problems but the trio reunited in 2009 to re-record "Do It!" from their first single for the Boss Goodman tribute CD Portobello Shuffle.

== Reception ==
The album is "generally considered to be The Fairies’ weakest of their three main Polydor albums, but it’s an unfair comparison", according to the website The Book Of Seth.

== Track listing ==
1. "Prologue" (Pink Fairies) - 1:21
2. "Right On, Fight On" (Pink Fairies) - 7:59
3. "Portobello Shuffle" (Pink Fairies) - 4:24
4. "Marilyn" (Pink Fairies) - 5:34
5. "The Pigs of Uranus" (Pink Fairies, Gilbert Shelton) - 3:27
6. "Walk Don't Run" (Johnny Smith; arranged by Pink Fairies) - 9:13
7. "I Went Up, I Went Down" (Pink Fairies) - 8:22
8. "X-Ray" (Pink Fairies) - 3:08
9. "I Saw Her Standing There" (John Lennon, Paul McCartney) - 3:09

=== 2002 CD bonus tracks ===
10. "Going Down" (Previously unreleased) - 5:39
11. "Walk Don't Run" (First version) (Previously unreleased) - 10:32

== Personnel ==
Pink Fairies

- Paul Rudolph – guitar, vocals
- Duncan Sanderson – bass
- Russell Hunter – drums

with

- Trevor Burton – guitar (2, 3)

Technical

- Frank Owen – engineer
- Pennie Smith – design
