= Human Garbage =

Live album by The Deviants
- Released: May 1984
- Recorded: Dingwalls, London, 3 February 1984
- Genre: Psychedelic rock
- Label: Psycho – 25

The Deviants chronology
Screwed Up (1977)	Human Garbage (1984)	Eating Jello with a Heated Fork (1996)

Human Garbage is a 1984 live album by the UK underground artist Mick Farren and friends, released under the name The Deviants.

Farren had relocated to New York but a return visit to London gave him the opportunity for this one-off performance with Larry Wallis' Previously Unreleased group at Dingwalls on 3 February 1984. In addition, former MC5 guitarist Wayne Kramer, a long-standing collaborator with Farren, flew in for this performance.

== Track listing ==
1. "Outrageous Contagious" (Mick Farren, Larry Wallis) – originally on Mick Farren and the Deviants Screwed Up EP
2. "Broken Statue" (Farren, Wallis) – originally a Mick Farren 1978 single A-side, later on Pink Fairies Kill 'Em and Eat 'Em LP
3. "Ramblin' Rose" (Fred Burch, Marijohn Wilkin) – originally on MC5's Kick Out the Jams LP
4. "Hey Thanks" (Wayne Kramer) – originally on Johnny Thunders and Wayne Kramer's Gang War
5. "Screwed Up" (Farren, Paul Rudolph) – originally on Mick Farren and the Deviants Screwed Up EP
6. "I Wanna Drink" (Farren, Wallis) – originally on Mick Farren's Vampires Stole My Lunch Money LP
7. "Taking LSD" (Wallis, Duncan Sanderson) – originally on Pink Fairies Kill 'Em and Eat 'Em LP
8. "Police Car" (Wallis) – originally a Larry Wallis 1978 single A-side
9. "Trouble Coming Every Day" (Frank Zappa) – originally on The Mothers of Invention's Freak Out! LP

== Personnel ==
The Deviants

- Mick Farren – vocals
- Larry Wallis – guitar, vocals
- Wayne Kramer – guitar
- Duncan Sanderson – bass
- George Butler – drums
