= Kings of Oblivion =

Studio album by Pink Fairies
- Released: June 1973
- Recorded: 1973
- Studio: Chipping Norton Recording Studios, Oxfordshire
- Genre: Hard rock; proto-punk
- Length: 38:01
- Label: Polydor
- Producer: David Hitchcock

Pink Fairies chronology
What a Bunch of Sweeties (1972)	Kings of Oblivion (1973)	Live at the Roundhouse 1975 (1982)

Kings of Oblivion is the third album by the UK underground group Pink Fairies, released in 1973.

Paul Rudolph had quit the group on the release of What a Bunch of Sweeties, thus briefly deactivating the band. Duncan Sanderson and Russell Hunter formed a new band with Steve Peregrin Took and guitarist Mick Wayne, before splitting from Took and re-activating the Pink Fairies with Wayne as singer/guitarist. This new three-piece recorded one single, "Well, Well, Well"/"Hold On", but Sanderson and Hunter were unhappy with the musical direction Wayne was taking the band. Convincing Larry Wallis (formerly of Took's 1970 band Shagrat) to join the group as a second guitarist, they then sacked Wayne passing songwriting and singing duties onto the inexperienced Wallis.

The album was named after a line from a David Bowie track titled "The Bewlay Brothers". The cover, by Edward Barker, parodied the popular flying ducks ornaments of the time but with flying pigs instead, pigs having become a motif for the band. An inner foldout sheet contained individual portraits of the group members in their chosen scenes of oblivion.

After this album the group continued touring, but Wallis, who wanted to be in "a very slick two guitar rock band", was at odds with Sanderson and Hunter's attitude of being "content to get up and jam for ten minutes". Eventually he would leave to join Lemmy in the first incarnation of Motörhead. "City Kids" was re-recorded for On Parole, Motörhead's 1976 cancelled debut album (eventually released 1979) with Wallis on guitar. It was re-recorded yet again by Motörhead for the B-side of their 1977 single "Motorhead", this time with "Fast" Eddie Clarke on guitar.

== Mixing and release ==
The Pink Fairies had not finished recording Kings of Oblivion before Polydor took the master tapes. According to one commentator, the label then "hastily mixed the LP while the Fairies were away on tour, even leaving the vocal tracks off one cut, 'Raceway'." Released to tie in with their concurrent tour, it was the band's third album, and first and only released in the United States. In 2002, all three of the band's albums were re-released on CD by Polydor.

== Critical reception ==
Professional ratings
Review scores
Source	Rating
AllMusic	4.5/5 stars
The Rolling Stone Album Guide	3.5/5 stars

On release, Kings of Oblivion was considered to be Pink Fairies' best album. Dan Nooger in The Village Voice praised the album and considered "City Kids" and "I Wish I Was a Girl" to communicate "more of what it's like being a Mod than all of Quadrophenia." A reviewer for Shepherds Bush Gazette, Hammersmith Post described Pink Fairies as one of the last "underground groups", whom they deemed a "dying breed". They noted the group's typically "brutal and heavy" sound and praised the "thumping drum and fast-fingered guitar passages" but criticised the vocals.

In a 1975 retrospective for NME, Mick Farren said that Kings of Oblivion "solved the Fairies' problem of original songs", adding that although Wallis was heavily influenced by Alice Cooper's work with Bob Ezrin, the resultant album was tight and tuneful. In a 1980 review, Ira Robbins of Trouser Press described the album to be an "amazing powerhouse", comprising "good heavy rock'n'roll" songs with careful structures, smart lyrics and "hot jamming". He felt that the band "could have been an English Cheap Trick if only the world had been ready." In a later publication for the same magazine, Robbins highlighted the album for its "monumental melodies and bizarre sideways lyrics". He concluded that "Kings is a widely unknown masterpiece that stands on its own but also set the stage for Motörhead, which Wallis and Hawkwind refugee Lemmy initially formed in 1975."

In the third edition of The Rolling Stone Album Guide, David Fricke wrote that despite "flat production and a slim songbook", the album adequately captured Pink Fairies' "neo-psychedelic bashing". In the fourth edition, an uncredited writer described Kings of Oblivion as a "long-forgotten ramp" that will appeal to "unreconstructed punks and thrash fans alike". Dave Thompson of AllMusic wrote that the introduction of Wallis to the band saw them create some of their most remarkable and concise music, with an "affirmative guttercat stance that so effectively predicted the rudiments of punk rock. Indeed, if any album could be said to have been born ahead of its time, Kings of Oblivion, conceived in 1973 but sounding just like 1977, is it." He concluded that the album remains "a tightly adrenalined beast, the summation of everything that the Pink Fairies promised and all that subsequent reunions have continued to deliver." In a review for Uncut, Carol Clerk wrote that the album saw Pink Fairies finally become a "great rock'n'roll band", adding that the music fulfilled their initial promise and commenting on the band's influence on punk and heavy metal, including on "an unusually complimentary John Lydon". BBC Music's Chris Jones also underscored the record's influence on punk and heavy metal and noted that the introduction of Wallis on "big guitar" increased the band's "outlaw biker credibility".

=== Rankings ===
In 1991, Chuck Eddy ranked Kings of Oblivion at number 109 in his list of the 500 best heavy metal albums, noting that – more so than Mott the Hoople – the Pink Fairies laid down the scope and possibilities of punk rock, as evidenced by the titles of "City Kids" and "Street Urchin", a song about "a woman who cleans hotel rooms and copulates doggie-style", the "speedrock" instrumental "Raceway", the Jean Cocteau quote on the sleeve, and more. Eddy adds of its prophetic sound: "Speed up the tempo of 'When's the Fun Begin', retain the diction and structure and mood and message, which apparently concerns a country gone to seed so now it's time to inhale nail-polish remover, and you've got the Adverts, whom riffsman Larry Wallis would one day produce."

== Track listing ==
1. "City Kids" (Wallis, Sanderson) - 3:45
2. "I Wish I Was a Girl" (Wallis) - 9:41
3. "When's the Fun Begin?" (Wallis, Mick Farren) - 6:13
4. "Chromium Plating" (Wallis) - 3:48
5. "Raceway" (Wallis) - 4:08
6. "Chambermaid" (Wallis, Sanderson, Hunter) - 3:18
7. "Street Urchin" (Wallis) - 7:07

=== 2002 CD bonus tracks ===
8. "Well, Well, Well" (Single version) (Wayne) - 3:59
9. "Hold On" (Single version) (Wayne, Sanderson, Hunter) - 4:10
10. "City Kids" (Alternate mix) - 3:42
11. "Well, Well, Well" (Alternate mix) - 3:20

== Personnel ==
Adapted from the liner notes of Kings of Oblivion

Pink Fairies

- Larry Wallis – guitar, vocals
- Duncan Sanderson – bass, vocals
- Russell Hunter – drums

Technical

- Dave Grinsted – engineer
- Peter Lavery – photography
