= Pink Fairies =

British rock band

- Pink Fairies in 1971

Background information
- Origin: London, England
- Genres: Proto-punk; hard rock; psychedelic rock
- Years active: 1969–1976; 1987–1988; 2014–present
- Labels: Polydor, Stiff, Demon, MLP
- Members: Paul Rudolph; Lucas Fox; Alan Davey
- Past members: Mick Farren; Steve Peregrin Took; Sally Meltzer AKA Silver Darling; Twink; Duncan Sanderson; Russell Hunter; Trevor Burton; Mick Wayne; Larry Wallis; Martin Stone; Andy Colquhoun; George Butler; Jaki Windmill

Pink Fairies are an English rock band initially active in the London (Ladbroke Grove) underground and psychedelic scene of the early 1970s. They promoted free music, drug use, and anarchy, and often performed impromptu gigs and other stunts, such as playing for nothing outside the gates at the Bath and Isle of Wight pop festivals in 1970, as well as appearing at Phun City, the second Glastonbury Festival, and other free festivals including Windsor and Trentishoe.

== History ==
=== Paul Rudolph incarnation, 1969–1972 ===
The group were formed after the three musicians from the Deviants (Paul Rudolph, guitar and vocals, Duncan Sanderson, bass and Russell Hunter, born Barry Russell Hunter, drums), dismissed their singer and leader Mick Farren during a disastrous tour of the West Coast of the United States. Prior to the tour, these musicians had collaborated on the Think Pink solo album by Twink, former drummer of the Pretty Things. Most of the musicians involved were members of a drinking club called the Pink Fairies Motorcycle Club and All-Star Rock and Roll Band, their name taken from a story written by Jamie Mandelkau. While the former Deviants' sidemen were still stranded in America after the tour, Twink, Farren and former Tyrannosaurus Rex percussionist Steve Peregrin Took had used the Pink Fairies name for various activities, including one shambolic gig in Manchester (with Farren on vocals, Took on guitar, Twink on drums, and Twink's girlfriend Sally Meltzer, also known as "Silver Darling", on keyboards) as well as the recording of Farren's solo album, Mona – The Carnivorous Circus. Within a few months Twink had left, followed by Farren, by which point Took had renamed the embryonic band Shagrat. In February 1970, Twink recruited the remaining Deviants to a new Pink Fairies line-up. Took continued with Shagrat as a vehicle for his own songs, and the two bands would appear as separate acts at the Phun City festival that summer.

The Fairies' music was upbeat good-time rock and roll, often jamming on the Beatles' "Tomorrow Never Knows", the Ventures' "Walk, Don't Run", "Ghost Riders in the Sky" and other standards. Their sets climaxed with the lengthy "Uncle Harry's Last Freakout", essentially an amalgam of old Deviants riffs that included extended guitar and double drum solos. They were closely associated with the UK underground, being based in the Ladbroke Grove scene and playing festivals, benefits, and free concerts. The band had strong connections with Farren's hometown Worthing, playing gigs for the Worthing Workshop. These included an appearance on a float in the Worthing Rotary Club Carnival Procession and a free open-air concert in Beach House Park. Playing for free in June 1970 outside the Bath Festival, they encountered another Ladbroke Grove based band, Hawkwind, who shared similar interests in music and recreational activities. A friendship developed which would lead to the two bands becoming running partners and performing as Pinkwind. Sensationalist coverage in the (Mick Farren edited) International Times solidified their rebel reputation.

Polydor Records commissioned the group to record a single, "The Snake" backed with "Do It", and were happy enough with the results to offer the group an album contract. The debut album Never Never Land was released in 1971. It featured live favourites "Uncle Harry's Last Freakout" and "Do It". An appearance at 1971's Glastonbury Fair led to them being given one side of the Glastonbury Fayre various artists triple album. In July 1971, Twink left to travel to Morocco. The band continued as a three-piece, occasionally augmented by former the Move bassist Trevor Burton on guitar. They released their second album What a Bunch of Sweeties in 1972, which featured some contributions from Burton. On the album's release and with a promotional tour pending Rudolph departed, going on to play on albums for Robert Calvert and Brian Eno. He would eventually replace Lemmy in Hawkwind.

=== Larry Wallis incarnation, 1973–1978 ===
Mick Wayne (born Michael Wayne, 1945, Hull, Yorkshire and died 26 June 1994), was Rudolph's replacement, having previously recorded on sessions for Took with Sanderson and Hunter at Olympic Studios, and later on loose sessions (along with sundry other underground musicians) in Took's flat in the basement of manager Tony Secunda's office, the fruits of which were released by Cleopatra Records in 1995. Feeling that Took's exceptionally heavy drug consumption would not make him a going concern, the remaining three instead formed a new version of the Pink Fairies, releasing the single "Well, Well, Well" backed with "Hold On", as well as doing a radio session for BBC Radio One and performing at the Empire Pool with Faces and the New York Dolls.

Sanderson and Hunter became unhappy with the musical direction Wayne was taking the band. They convinced Larry Wallis, who had played with Shagrat and later UFO, and would subsequently be a founding member of Motörhead, to join the group as a second guitarist. Shortly after, they dismissed Wayne, passing songwriting and singing duties onto Wallis. This new three-piece then recorded the 1973 album Kings of Oblivion. Out of contract with Polydor, the band continued touring to a decreasing audience, until finally calling it a day. Wallis went on to join Lemmy in the first incarnation of Motörhead, then became the in-house record producer for Stiff Records. Sanderson joined Lightning Raiders and Hunter left the music business.

Ted Carroll, head of Chiswick Records, organised a one-off re-union concert at the Roundhouse on 13 July 1975, featuring all five previous major members of the group (released in 1982 as Live at the Roundhouse 1975). Following this concert, Wallis, Sanderson and Hunter gave the Pink Fairies another try. This line-up eventually gave numerous 'farewell tours' before disbanding. After a period of inactivity they entered the burgeoning punk rock scene as one of the few 'hairy' bands revered by the new guard. Recruiting former Chilli Willi and the Red Hot Peppers guitarist Martin Stone, they toured and released the single "Between the Lines" (backed with "Spoiling for a Fight") on Stiff Records but, with little interest being shown in them, they once again split up. Rudolph and Wallis resumed playing for Farren in 1977/78, releasing the EP Screwed Up as The Deviants again on Stiff, but Rudolph returned to his native Canada prior to the recording of 1978's Vampires Stole My Lunch Money and follow up single "Broken Statue".

=== 1980s and 1990s ===
In the early 1980s, Wallis, Sanderson and drummer George Butler (ex-Lightning Raiders) recorded and played live, the albums Previously Unreleased (1982) and the Deviants' Human Garbage (live 1984) being released. The band went under many names including the Police Cars, the Police Sleighs, the Donut Dunkers of Death, and finally the Love Pirates Of Doom, the most settled line-up being Wallis, Sanderson, Butler and second guitarist Andy Colquhoun (ex-Warsaw Pakt & Brian James' Tanz Der Youth).

In 1987, Jake Riviera, head of Demon Records, offered a recording contract for a reformed Pink Fairies. Of the five group members, Paul Rudolph was not involved, so the second guitarist position was taken up by Colquhoun. This band released the album Kill 'Em and Eat 'Em and toured following a sell-out show at London's Town & Country Club before once again splitting up in 1988. After Twink's departure, they carried on until Wallis also left, at which point the remaining members toured and recorded as Flying Colours. An archive live album Chinese Cowboys: Live 1987 was issued in Japan in 2005 on Captain Trip Records.

Following this period the magazine UHCK (Uncle Harry's City Kids - run initially by Jeff Holmes and later by Tim Rundall) collaborated with the band to produce two tape releases (Silence Of The Hams and Son Of Ham) and two CDs (Son Of Ham extended version and Hogwatch) for subscribers, all featuring entirely unreleased music by members of the band in various side projects (the Deviants, Lightning Raiders etc.), radio sessions and specially written material. In common with many 'official' Pink Fairies releases the artwork was by the late underground cartoonist Edward J. Barker (I.T., Nasty Tales) noted for his Largactalites cartoons and his pig and crow caricatures. Much of the magazine was actually written by ex-band members and by longtime associate, road manager, 'wet nurse' and manager of Dingwalls, Boss Goodman, who went on to become a renowned chef, once cooking for US President Bill Clinton at the Portobello Gold.

In the mid-1990s Twink collaborated with Rudolph and the pair recorded 1996's Pleasure Island and 1997's No Picture, released as the Pink Fairies on Twink's own label. Twink also issued a plethora of albums featuring outtakes, alternative versions, BBC sessions and live material including: The Golden Years 1969-1971, Do It, Live at Weeley Festival 1971 and Mandies and Mescaline Round at Uncle Harry's (1998).

Took died 27 October 1980. Wayne died 26 June 1994.

=== 21st century ===
During the early 2000s, Polydor remastered and released their Pink Fairies catalogue with bonus cuts, and issued the sampler albums Master Series and Up the Pinks: An Introduction.

The Kings of Oblivion line-up (Wallis, Sanderson and Hunter) were scheduled to play at a one-off gig on 22 January 2007 at the Roundhouse, London and record a BBC session for Stuart Maconie's Freakzone radio programme, but activities were cancelled at the last minute due to ill-health. In 2007, the biography Keep it Together! Cosmic Boogie with the Deviants and Pink Fairies by Rich Deakin, Mick Farren's webmaster, was published by Headpress. In September 2009, the What a Bunch of Sweeties line-up (Rudolph, Sanderson and Hunter) re-united in the studio to record a new version of "Do It" for the various artists CD Portobello Shuffle: A Testimonial To Boss Goodman And Tribute To The Deviants & Pink Fairies. The CD was a fund-raiser for Goodman, who was suffering from the after-effects of a stroke.

In 2011, Farren and Colquhoun returned to the UK from Los Angeles after nearly 20 years in exile. They teamed up with the rhythm section of Hunter and Sanderson, along with second guitarist Tim Rundall and percussionist Jaki Windmill, for a number of appearances. This line-up performed on the 'Spirit of 71' stage at the 2011 Glastonbury Festival - 40 years after the Pink Fairies' previous appearance at that event - under the name 'Mick Farren & The Last Men Standing'. Without Rundall, they later performed as The Deviants until Farren's death in 2013.

In 2014, the Pink Fairies reformed with a line-up of Hunter, Sanderson, Colquhoun, Windmill and second drummer Butler. Initially announcing two dates - The Robin 2 in Bilston on 15 May and 100 Club in London on 17 May - more dates were later added up to October 2015. A new album called Naked Radio was released after a Pledgemusic campaign ended on 12 February 2017.

Rudolph completed recordings with Motörhead's first drummer Lucas Fox and Hawkwind bass player Alan Davey in Austin, Texas, to be released as a Pink Fairies album on Cleopatra Records in 2018. One track appeared on the 2017 compilation Halloween Garage Blues. The LP Resident Reptiles was released on August 24, 2018. A second album by this line-up, Screwed Up, was released in July 2023.

Stone died November 2016. Butler died in January 2018. Goodman died on 22 March 2018. Wallis died on 19 September 2019, and Sanderson died just two months later on 20 November 2019. Rundall died in January 2022, and Hunter died on 19 December 2023, at the age of 77.

== Line-ups ==
Period	Members	Releases
October 1969 – January 1970	Mick Farren – vocals; Steve Peregrin Took – guitars; Silver Darling – keyboards; Twink – drums	none – rehearsals and one gig only
Feb 1970 – mid 1971	Paul Rudolph – vocals, guitars; Duncan Sanderson – bass; Russell Hunter – drums; Twink – drums, vocals	"The Snake" (1971); Never Never Land (1971
mid 1971 – July 1972	Paul Rudolph – vocals, guitars; Duncan Sanderson – bass; Russell Hunter – drums	"I Saw Her Standing There" (1972); What a Bunch of Sweeties (1972)
July 1972 – November 1972	Mick Wayne – vocals, guitars; Duncan Sanderson – bass; Russell Hunter – drums	"Well Well Well" (1972)
December 1972 – end of 1974	Larry Wallis – vocals, guitars; Duncan Sanderson – bass; Russell Hunter – drums	Kings of Oblivion (1973)
1975	Larry Wallis – vocals, guitars; Paul Rudolph – vocals, guitars; Duncan Sanderson – bass; Russell Hunter – drums; Twink – drums, vocals	Live at the Roundhouse (1982)
1982	Larry Wallis – vocals, guitars; Duncan Sanderson – bass; George Butler – drums	Previously Unreleased (1984)
1987	Larry Wallis – vocals, guitars; Andy Colquhoun – vocals, guitars; Duncan Sanderson – bass; Russell Hunter – drums; Twink – drums, vocals	Kill 'Em and Eat 'Em (1987)
January 2007	Larry Wallis – vocals, guitars; Duncan Sanderson – bass; Russell Hunter – drums	
September 2009	Paul Rudolph – vocals, guitars; Duncan Sanderson – bass; Russell Hunter – drums	
2014	Andy Colquhoun – vocals, guitars; Duncan Sanderson – bass; Russell Hunter – drums; Jaki Windmill – keyboards; George Butler – drums	
2018 – present	Paul Rudolph – vocals, guitars; Alan Davey – bass; Lucas Fox – drums	

== Discography ==
=== Albums ===
- 1971 – Never Never Land (Polydor) – Rudolph; Sanderson; Hunter; Twink
- 1972 – What a Bunch of Sweeties (Polydor) – Rudolph; Sanderson; Hunter; Burton - UK No. 48
- 1973 – Kings of Oblivion (Polydor) – Wallis; Sanderson; Hunter
- 1987 – Kill 'Em and Eat 'Em (Demon) – Wallis; Colquhoun; Sanderson; Hunter; Twink
- 1996 – Pleasure Island (Twink Records) – Twink; Rudolph
- 1997 – No Picture (Twink Records) – Twink; Rudolph
- 2017 – Naked Radio (Gonzo Music) – Colquhoun; Sanderson; Hunter; Butler; Windmill
- 2018 – Resident Reptiles (Purple Pyramid) – Rudolph; Davey; Fox
- 2023 – Screwed Up (Cleopatra Records) – Rudolph; Davey; Fox
- 2026 – Covered In Pink (Cleopatra Records) – Rudolph; Davey

=== EPs ===
- 1978 - Twink and the Fairies (Chiswick) – Twink; Sanderson - consisting of the tracks "Do It '77", "Psychedelic Punkeroo" and "Enter The Diamonds"
- 1984 – Previously Unreleased (Big Beat) – Wallis; Sanderson; Butler - recorded 1982

=== Compilation albums ===
- 1975 - Flashback (Polydor)
- 1999 - Live at the Roundhouse / Previously Unreleased / Do It '77 (Big Beat) - UK Indie No. 13
- 1999 – Master Series (Universal)
- 2002 – Up the Pinks – An Introduction to Pink Fairies (Polydor)
- 2021 – Duo Up (Explore Rights Management Ltd via Cherry Red)

=== Singles ===
- 1971 - "The Snake" / "Do It" (Polydor) – Rudolph; Sanderson; Hunter; Twink
- 1972 - "Pigs of Uranus" / "I Saw Her Standing There" (German Polydor release) Rudolph; Sanderson; Hunter
- 1973 - "Well, Well, Well" / "Hold On" (Polydor) – Wayne; Sanderson; Hunter
- 1976 - "Between the Lines" / "Spoiling for a Fight" (Stiff) – Wallis; Stone; Sanderson; Hunter

=== Live albums ===
- 1982 – Live at the Roundhouse 1975 (Big Beat) – Wallis; Rudolph; Sanderson; Hunter; Twink
- 1998 - The Golden Years: 1969–1971 (Cleopatra Records) – Rudolph; Sanderson; Hunter; Twink (live, BBC sessions, Twink solo material)
- 1998 - Mescaline and Mandies Round at Uncle Harry's (NMC) – Rudolph; Sanderson; Hunter; Twink; Burton (BBC sessions, live)
- 1999 - Do It! (Total Energy) – Rudolph; Sanderson; Hunter; Twink (live, Twink solo material)
- 1999 - Live at Weeley 1971 (Get Back) – Rudolph; Sanderson; Hunter (live)
- 2005 - Chinese Cowboys (Captain Trip) – Wallis; Colquhoun; Sanderson; Hunter; Twink (live 1987)
- 2008 - Finland Freakout 1971 Major League Productions (MLP) - Rudolph; Sanderson; Hunter (live)
