= Kill 'Em and Eat 'Em =

Studio album by Pink Fairies
- Released: October 1987
- Recorded: 1987
- Genre: Rock and roll
- Label: Demon
- Producer: Barry Farmer

Pink Fairies chronology
Previously Unreleased (1984)	Kill 'Em and Eat 'Em (1987)	Pleasure Island (1996)

Professional ratings
Review scores
Source	Rating
AllMusic	3/5 stars
New Musical Express	4/10

Kill 'Em and Eat 'Em is a 1987 album by the UK underground group Pink Fairies.

This is a reformed Pink Fairies, prompted by an offer from Jake Riviera, head of Demon Records. Of the five original group members, Paul Rudolph wasn't involved. Wallis' preference for having a fellow guitarist led to the inclusion of the only non-former member Andy Colquhoun, but Colquhoun had worked extensively alongside Wallis from 1978 and year before that with Mick Farren during Warsaw Pakt band, also during 1980s The Deviants group. Farren himself contributes some lyrics, including those of a re-recording of his "Broken Statue" single.

== Track listing ==
1. "Broken Statue" (Wallis, Farren)
2. "Fear of Love" (Wallis)
3. "Undercover of Confusion" (Colquhoun)
4. "Waiting for the Ice Cream to Melt" (Colquhoun, Farren)
5. "Taking LSD" (Wallis, Sanderson)
6. "White Girls on Amphetamine" (Colquhoun, Farren)
7. "Seeing Double" (Wallis)
8. "Fool About You" (Wallis)
9. "Bad Attitude" (Wallis, Norman Gordon-Pilkington)
10. "I Might Be Lying" (Colquhoun, Wallis)

== Personnel ==
Pink Fairies

- Andy Colquhoun – guitar, vocals
- Larry Wallis – guitar, vocals
- Duncan Sanderson – bass
- Russell Hunter – drums
- Twink – drums, vocals

Technical

- Recorded at Picnic Studios
- Engineered and mixed by Mike Banks
- Assistant Engineer – Spyda
- Keith Morris – photography
