= Freak Scene Musicians =

Group of musicians

Musicians associated with the 1960s and 70s term "Freak scene" include Frank Zappa and the Mothers of Invention, John Lennon, The Bonzo Dog Band, Mick Farren and The Deviants and many others. A lot of the music and performance artists centred around California or New York with another significant contingent coming from the United Kingdom.

In 1967, musician Rusty Evans, formerly of the Deep, formed the group the Freak Scene releasing the album Psychedelic Psoul in New York. He did not invent term "Freak Scene". That was already out there.

Shindig! magazine used the term "freak scene" to refer to the British underground's Ladbroke Grove scene, referring to it as the "Ladbroke freak scene". They further stated the scene had "somehow even made its way to Texas".

== Legacy ==
In 1988, Dinosaur Jr released their third studio album Bug which includes the track "Freak Scene", which in turn has given its name to restaurants owned by chef Scott Hallsworth.
