= Shagrat =

Shagrat may refer to:

- Shagrat, an Orc in The Lord of the Rings by J. R. R. Tolkien
- Shagrat (band), an English rock band formed by Steve Peregrin Took and Mick Farren, later led by Took alone
- Shagrat (rodent), a hypothetical creature in the television series The Future Is Wild
- Shajarat al-Durr, Sultan of Egypt

== See also ==
- Shagrath (born 1976), lead singer of Norwegian symphonic black metal band Dimmu Borgir
