= Never Never Land (Pink Fairies album) =

Studio album by Pink Fairies
- Released: May 1971
- Recorded: 1971
- Studio: Command Studios, London
- Length: 46:21
- Label: Polydor
- Producer: Pink Fairies, Neil Slaven

Pink Fairies chronology
| Never Never Land (1971) | What a Bunch of Sweeties (1972) |

Professional ratings
Review scores
| Source | Rating |
|---|---|
| Allmusic | 4/5 stars |

Never Never Land is the 1971 debut album by the UK underground group Pink Fairies.

Polydor Records commissioned the group to record a single, "The Snake"/"Do It", and were happy enough with the results to offer the group an album contract. A promotional film was recorded for the single on the set of Oliver!, but the single was omitted from this debut album. The b-side, "Do It", did appear but with added overdubs. "Do It" was later covered by the Henry Rollins Band on their Do It album.

The sleeve came in a printed PVC cover, with an inner gatefold sleeve depicting two different scenescapes, and a printed inner sleeve with a photograph of the band.

Two hundred copies were also pressed on pink vinyl the same year. Initial pressings credited the full band as songwriters on all songs. Later pressings list drummer Twink (John Alder) as songwriter for "Heavenly Man", "War Girl", "Thor", and "The Dream is Just Beginning".

== Track listing ==
1. "Do It" (Pink Fairies) - 4:15
2. "Heavenly Man" (Alder) - 3:41
3. "Say You Love Me" (Pink Fairies) - 3:48
4. "War Girl" (Alder) - 4:34
5. "Never Never Land" (Pink Fairies) - 6:55
6. "Track One, Side Two" (Pink Fairies) - 4:41
7. "Thor" (Alder) - 0:58
8. "Teenage Rebel" (Pink Fairies) - 5:20
9. "Uncle Harry's Last Freak-Out" (Pink Fairies) - 10:51
10. "The Dream Is Just Beginning" (Alder) - 1:18

=== 2002 CD bonus tracks ===
11. "The Snake" (Pink Fairies) - 3:58
12. "Do It" (Single version) (Pink Fairies) - 3:04
13. "War Girl" (Alternate extended mix) (Alder) - 4:34
14. "Uncle Harry's Last Freak-Out" (First version) (Alder) - 12:24

== Personnel ==
Pink Fairies

- Paul Rudolph – guitar, vocals
- Duncan Sanderson – bass
- Russell Hunter – drums
- Twink – drums, vocals

== Production ==
- Produced by Pink Fairies & Neil Slaven
- Recorded & Engineered by Andy Hendriksen & Gary Lyons
- Pennie Smith, Tony Vesely - sleeve design
