= Live at the Roundhouse =

Live at the Roundhouse may refer to:

- Live at the Roundhouse 1975, an album by Pink Fairies, 1982
- Live at the Roundhouse (Dresden Dolls album), 2007
- Live at the Roundhouse (Nick Mason's Saucerful of Secrets album), 2020

== See also ==
- Roundhouse (venue) § Discography
