= Live at the Roundhouse 1975 =

Live album by Pink Fairies
- Released: June 1982
- Recorded: July 13, 1975
- Venue: The Roundhouse, London
- Label: Big Beat - WIK14
- Producer: Jerry Green

Pink Fairies chronology
Kings of Oblivion (1973)	Live at the Roundhouse 1975 (1982)	Previously Unreleased (1984)

Professional ratings
Review scores
Source	Rating
Allmusic	2.5/5 stars

Live at the Roundhouse 1975 is a 1982 album of a 1975 concert by the UK underground group Pink Fairies.

A one-off reunion concert featuring all five previous members of the group was organised by Ted Carroll, head of Chiswick Records. At the time of this gig, former member Paul Rudolph was also playing bass for Hawkwind and Larry Wallis was playing guitar for Motörhead. The tapes were licensed from Douglas Smith for release in 1982, although only part of the concert was issued, the rest being deemed unsuitable for public consumption.

It was pressed on pink vinyl with a cover by long-standing collaborator Edward Barker featuring a pig which had become the band's ident. The track "Going Down" is a cover of the Freddie King song, but was erroneously credited to Lou Reed on the original release.

The actual concert included many live favourites from the Pink Fairies history not represented on the LP. Other songs performed at the concert included "Do It", "3/5 Mile in 10 Seconds", "The Snake", "Street Urchin" and "Bye Bye Johnny". Poor recording quality led to an abbreviated release. This was in truth the 2nd reunion of the year, the first having taken place in Feb 16 without the presence of Twink and generally considered the better of the two among fans despite the Fairies non-headlining status at the earlier gig. Demand was so high that those locked out attempted to burn down the doors of the venue. The stage was 'enhanced' by a large polystyrene Mandrax tablet erected by the road crew and the distribution to the crowd of many cannabis 'joints'. Such was the reaction that the trio of Wallis/Sanderson/Hunter went on to tour at length after the second concert, Wallis juggling his commitment to Motorhead.

The CD edition consists of Live at the Roundhouse 1975 with the EPs Previously Unreleased (1984; recorded in 1982) and Twink and the Fairies (1978), in that order, as bonus tracks. "Twink & The Fairies" in fact a wholly unrelated project, the only other 'fairy' being Sanderson on bass for "Do It 77".

== Track listing ==
Vinyl

1. "City Kids" (Wallis, Sanderson)
2. "Waiting for the Man" (Lou Reed)
3. "Lucille" (Albert Collins, Richard Penniman)
4. "Uncle Harry's Last Freakout" (Sanderson, Rudolph, Hunter)
5. "Going Down" (Don Nix)

CD reissue bonus tracks

Previously Unreleased (recorded 1982)

6. "As Long As The Price Is Right"
7. "Waiting For The Lightning To Strike"
8. "Can't Find The Lady"
9. "No Second Chance"
10. "Talk of The Devil"
11. "I Think It's Coming Back Again"

Twink and the Fairies (1978)

12. "Do It 1977" (Twink & The Fairies)
13. "Psychedelic Punkeroo" (Twink & The Fairies)
14. "Enter The Diamonds" (Twink & The Fairies)

== Personnel ==
Pink Fairies

- Paul Rudolph – guitar, vocals
- Larry Wallis – guitar, vocals
- Duncan Sanderson – bass, vocals
- Russell Hunter – drums
- Twink – drums, vocals
