= Underground music =

Music perceived as outside or opposed to mainstream popular music

Underground music is music with practices perceived as outside, or somehow opposed to, mainstream popular music culture. Underground styles lack the commercial success of popular music movements, and may involve the use of avant-garde or abrasive approaches. Underground music may be perceived as expressing sincerity and creative freedom in opposition to those practices deemed formulaic or market-driven. Tying into broader anti-establishment themes, counterculture music can refer to a web of various nonconforming social groups that distinguish themselves from mainstream society.

== History ==
=== 1960s ===
In the 1960s, the term "underground" was associated with the counterculture of that decade, and applied to journalism, comics and film as well as music. Underground music was defined by groups who garnered a following without a successful single or significant radio airplay and were associated with the general underground culture and scene. The Fugs, who formed in 1964, were described as "arguably the first underground rock group of all time".

On the October 12, 1966 issue of British music magazine Record Mirror, writer Norman Jopling describes the early underground "freak-out music" movement which would later be broadly known as psychedelic rock, as an authentic movement that was "not concocted" and was only beginning to be exploited by "big business":

The whole movement was initially underground (even now, Freak Out records are not played on U.S. radio stations), and that the philosophy is one of the few in connection with the pop music field (or rock 'n' roll, as the Americans call pop) which was not concocted by Madison Avenue. In fact. U.S. big business is only just beginning to realise that there are dollars to be made from this cult. Last week's "Billboard" reports that many record companies are reaching out for "underground" groups-who are getting nearly all of their exposure in coffee houses. Three labels, ESP, Atlantic, and MGM are battling to sign the Fugs whose first LP on ESP has been on the Billboard' LP chart for fourteen weeks without any air play.

Jopling cites Frank Zappa and the Mothers Of Invention, the Blues Project, the Velvet Underground and the Paul Butterfield Blues Band as "other groups in this category." Further adding that although the Butterfield Blues Band "play a different kind of music, [they] are still regarded as an underground group due to their lack of air play". Zappa attempted to define "underground" by noting that the "mainstream comes to you, but you have to go to the underground." Additionally, musicians associated with the UK underground, Australian underground and Los Angeles freak scene would also be referred to as "underground music".

=== 1970s–1980s ===
Gothic and industrial music are two other types of underground music originating in the late 1970s and mid-1990s with gothic rock centering around vampires, black magic and the occult and industrial music using primarily computer generated sounds and hard driving beats.

In a CounterPunch article, Twiin argues that "Underground music is free media", because by working "independently, you can say anything in your music" and be free of corporate censorship. The genre of post-punk is often considered a "catchall category for underground, indie, or lo-fi guitar rock" bands which "initially avoided major record labels in the pursuit of artistic freedom, and out of an 'us against them' stance towards the corporate rock world", spreading "west over college station airwaves, small clubs, fanzines, and independent record stores." Underground music of this type is often promoted through word-of-mouth or by community radio DJs. In the early underground scenes, such as the Grateful Dead jam band fan scenes or the 1970s punk scenes, crude home-made tapes were traded (in the case of Deadheads) or sold from the stage or from the trunk of a car (in the punk scene). In the 2000s, underground music became easier to distribute, using streaming audio and podcasts.

The NWOBHM movement emerged which created a multitude of bands that kept heavy metal music alive and where it spread in the underground scene during the period of the mid 70s to the early 80s. Some underground styles eventually became mainstream, commercialized pop styles, such as the underground hip hop style of the early 1980s. In the 2000s, the increasing availability of the Internet and digital music technologies has made underground music easier to distribute using streaming audio and podcasts. Some experts in cultural studies now argue that "there is no underground" because the Internet has made what was underground music accessible to everyone at the click of a mouse. One expert, Martin Raymond, of London-based company The Future Laboratory, commented in an article in The Independent, saying trends in music, art, and politics are:

... now transmitted laterally and collaboratively via the internet. You once had a series of gatekeepers in the adoption of a trend: the innovator, the early adopter, the late adopter, the early mainstream, the late mainstream, and finally the conservative. But now it goes straight from the innovator to the mainstream.

A music underground can also refer to the culture of underground music in a city and its accompanying performance venues. The Kitchen is an example of what was an important New York City underground music venue in the 1960s and 1970s. CBGB was another famous New York City underground music venue claiming to be "Home of Underground Rock since 1973".

There are examples of underground music that are particularly difficult to encounter, such as the underground rock scenes in the pre-Mikhail Gorbachev Soviet Union, which have amassed a devoted following over the years (most notably for bands such as Kino). However, most underground music is readily accessible, despite most performances being located in unmarked, industrial venues.

== See also ==
- Underground art
- Underground culture
- Underground hip hop
- Underground film
- Freak Scene Musicians
