= Previously Unreleased =

EP by Pink Fairies
- Released: 1984
- Recorded: 1982
- Genre: Hard rock
- Label: Big Beat
- Producer: Larry Wallis

Pink Fairies chronology
Live at the Roundhouse 1975 (1982)	Previously Unreleased (1984)	Kill 'Em and Eat 'Em (1987)

Previously Unreleased is a 1984 EP by the English guitarist Larry Wallis, released under the name Pink Fairies.

The EP contains "As Long as the Price is Right" which had previously been issued as a single by Dr. Feelgood (who would cover "Talk of the Devil" and "Can't Find the Lady" on their Doctor's Orders and Mad Man Blues albums, respectively). That song, and "It's Coming Back Again" were both originally recorded by Wallis for his aborted solo LP for the Stiff label in considerably different form. The EP came out while Wallis was playing with Butler and Sanderson in a band with many names, most notably 'The Police Cars' and 'The Love Pirates of Doom' along with second guitarist Andy Colquhoun and was recorded at that time, though without Colquhoun's input. The line-up played many gigs at Dingwalls, once appearing as The Deviants with Mick Farren (vocals) having also been the support band, and later at the Cricketers (Oval) and (once) in Leeds (minus Sanderson). The reformed Pink Fairies (1987) was essentially this combo with Russell Hunter and, for a while, Twink replacing George Butler.

The entirety of the EP was reissued as bonus tracks on the CD edition of Live at the Roundhouse 1975, along with the 1978 Twink and the Fairies EP.

== Track listing ==
1. "As Long as the Price is Right" (Wallis)
2. "Waiting for the Lightning to Strike" (Wallis)
3. "Can't Find The Lady" (Wallis)
4. "No Second Chance" (Wallis, Sanderson)
5. "Talk of the Devil" (Wallis, Sanderson)
6. "I Think It's Coming Back Again" (Wallis, Mick Farren)

== Personnel ==
Pink Fairies

- Larry Wallis – guitar, vocals
- Duncan Sanderson – bass
- George Butler – drums
