= Vampires Stole My Lunch Money =

Studio album by Mick Farren
- Released: August 1978
- Recorded: May 1978
- Studio: Pathway Studios, London
- Genre: Punk rock
- Label: Logo - LOGO1010
- Producer: Larry Wallis

Mick Farren chronology
Mona – The Carnivorous Circus (1970)	Vampires Stole My Lunch Money (1978)

Professional ratings
Review scores
Source	Rating
AllMusic	4/5 stars
The Encyclopedia of Popular Music	3/5 stars

Vampires Stole My Lunch Money is a 1978 album by the UK underground artist Mick Farren.

Farren had left music performance after his 1970 album Mona – The Carnivorous Circus to concentrate on journalism and writing. However, in 1976 he had the opportunity whilst in New York to record the single "Play With Fire"/"Lost Johnny" reigniting his interest in performing again. The Screwed Up EP followed in 1977, recorded for Stiff Records and featuring Larry Wallis, Paul Rudolph, Alan Powell and Andy Colquhoun.

Newly formed Logo Records approached Farren with the possibility of re-releasing some of his material but were delighted when he expressed a preference for recording new material. Retaining his band, minus Rudolph who had returned to his native Canada, the group recorded this album which featured guest appearances from fellow NME journalist Chrissie Hynde, Curved Air singer Sonja Kristina, former Dr. Feelgood guitarist Wilko Johnson and harmonica player Will Stallibrass.

"Half Price Drinks"/"I Don't Want to Go This Way" was released as a single from the album, followed by the non-album single "Broken Statue"/"It's All in the Picture".

== Critical reception ==
LA Weekly, in a retrospective article, called the album "a sonic car crash of self-degradation." Trouser Press called it a "solo masterwork," writing that Farren "dishes out a harrowingly honest collection of songs about drinking, dissolution, depression, self-destruction and desperation. About as powerful as rock gets, this nakedly painful LP is most definitely not recommended to sissies, moralists and born-again Christians."

== Track listing ==
All tracks composed by Mick Farren and Larry Wallis; except where indicated

1. "Trouble Coming Everyday" (Frank Zappa)
2. "Half Price Drinks"
3. "I Don’t Want to Go This Way"
4. "I Want a Drink"
5. "Son of a Millionaire"
6. "Zombie Line"
7. "Bela Lugosi" (Farren, Andy Colquhoun)
8. "People Call You Crazy" (Farren, Andy Colquhoun)
9. "Fast Eddie" (Farren, Andy Colquhoun)
10. "Let Me In, Damn You"
11. "(I Know From) Self Destruction" (Farren)
12. "Drunk in the Morning"

== Personnel ==
- Mick Farren – vocals
- Larry Wallis – guitar, bass
- Andy Colquhoun – guitar, bass
- Alan Powell – drums

with

- Chrissie Hynde – vocals
- Sonja Kristina – vocals
- Wilko Johnson – guitar
- Will Stallibrass – harmonica

Technical

- Dave Goodman - executive producer
- Chas Herington - engineer
- Pearce Marchbank - photography
