= Twink (musician) =

English musician (born 1944)

- Also known as: Mohammed Abdullah
- Born: John Charles Edward Alder; 29 November 1944 (age 81); Colchester, Essex, England
- Genre: Psychedelic rock
- Occupations: Musician; singer; songwriter; actor
- Instruments: Drums; vocals
- Years active: 1963–present
- Labels: Decca; His Master's Voice; Parlophone; Sire; Columbia; Rare Earth; Midnight

John Charles Edward Alder (born 29 November 1944), also known as Twink, is an English drummer, actor, singer, and songwriter who was a central figure in the English psychedelic and proto-punk movement. He was a member of the Pretty Things from 1967 to 1969, and an occasional member of Pink Fairies, plus several other bands.

In 2006, Alder converted to Islam, and changed his name to Mohammed Abdullah. However, he still records under the name Twink.

== Biography ==
=== Early life and career ===
Alder was born in Colchester, Essex, England. Many of his family members were also musicians, including his grandmother, who was a concert pianist and soloist.

Alder was interested in music from a young age. His professional career began in 1963 when he played the drums for Dane Stephens and the Deep Beats, a rhythm and blues band from Colchester. In 1964, after performing for a year, the band changed its name to the Fairies. Due to the band's growing popularity, its members began receiving regular gifts from their music fans. Alder, who had long curly hair at the time, regularly received bottles of Twink brand home perm lotion. He eventually adopted 'Twink' as his stage name.

He later reunited with Dane Stephens and Mick Weaver from the Fairies for two tracks on his 1991 album Odds & Beginnings.

=== The In-Crowd and Tomorrow ===
Twink moved to Chelsea in London in 1965. When the Fairies broke up in August 1966, he joined a rhythm and blues/soul music band called the In-Crowd whose previous drummer had left. Other members of the In-Crowd included Steve Howe (guitar; later of Yes fame), singer Keith West, and bassist John 'Junior' Wood. A few months later, the band decided to change their name to Tomorrow. The success of West's solo recording, Excerpt from A Teenage Opera, resulted in the band's breakup and led to a one-off single by the short-lived band 'Aquarian Age' (Twink and Junior).

In his book White Bicycles, Joe Boyd cites a Tomorrow show at the UFO Club in London's Camden borough—and Twink's performance in particular—as the zenith of 1960s pop culture. Tomorrow also played with guitarist Jimi Hendrix at UFO.

In 1967, Twink completed a recording session with a group called Santa Barbara Machine Head. They featured two former members of the beat group the Birds: Ron Wood (later of the Creation, Faces and the Rolling Stones) and Kim Gardner (later also of The Creation and Ashton, Gardner & Dyke); and keyboardist Jon Lord (later of Deep Purple).

=== The Pretty Things ===
Twink replaced Skip Alan in the band the Pretty Things, joining Phil May, Dick Taylor, Wally Allen, and Jon Povey. He participated in the making of their album S.F. Sorrow. He was also a member of this group when they appeared in the Norman Wisdom film What's Good for the Goose. Twink became famous for his outrageous behaviour, such as climbing the speaker stacks and diving into the audience when the band performed at a free open-air concert in London's Hyde Park.

=== Think Pink ===
Twink recorded his first solo album, Think Pink, toward the end of his tenure with the Pretty Things. Supporting musicians included proto-punk forerunners the Deviants, including Mick Farren (who produced the album), Paul Rudolph (guitar), Duncan 'Sandy' Sanderson, and Steve Peregrin Took (of Tyrannosaurus Rex), who contributed two of the songs. It also featured May, Povey, Waller, and Victor Unitt of the Pretty Things, Viv Prince (ex-Pretty Things), John 'The Honk' Lodge (Junior's Eyes, Quiver), 'Junior' Wood, and the 'Pink Fairies Motorcycle Club and All-Star Rock and Roll Band'. The name "Pink Fairies" was derived from a story by Deviants manager Jamie Mandelkau, who may not have been aware of Twink's former band.

=== Pink Fairies ===
The lineup of the Pink Fairies (Mark 1) featured Think Pink musicians Twink, Took, and Farren – all three having left their respective bands - and was named after the 'Pink Fairies Rock 'n' Roll Club', a loose group of affiliated musicians including Took, Farren, the Deviants, Syd Barrett (formerly of Pink Floyd), and the Pretty Things. They played in Ladbroke Grove, home of the UK underground. The Mark 1 lineup — including Twink's girlfriend Sally "Silver Darling" Melzer on keyboards — performed one shambolic gig in Manchester and recorded Farren's solo album Mona – The Carnivorous Circus in late 1969 before falling apart. Took, Farren, former Entire Sioux Nation guitarist and bassist (and later Motörhead founder) Larry Wallis, and Tim Taylor then assembled Shagrat, with Farren departing before any recordings were made and drummer Phil Lenoir joining to complete the line-up.

Pink Fairies (Mark 2) was formed in early 1970 by Twink with Mick Farren's former bandmates, the Deviants. The two-drummer Pink Fairies line-up recorded a single called "The Snake" / "Do It" followed by the Never Never Land album before Twink left in 1971 (although he would periodically return). A cover version of "The Snake" was later recorded by Algy Ward's heavy rock band, Tank.

=== Stars ===
After a spell living in Morocco, Twink moved to Cambridge and worked with the 'Last Minute Put Together Boogie Band', which initially included vocalist/guitarist Bruce Michael Paine (ex-Apple Pie and star of the San Francisco production of Hair) and 'The Honk' playing bass. He also played in a band named ZZZ with Alan Lee Shaw and Rod Latter, who later reunited as the Rings. The Last Minute Put Together Boogie Band, now with ex-Delivery bass player Jack Monck, backed American blues guitarist Eddie "Guitar" Burns at King's College Cellar in January 1972. Monck's wife Jenny Spires, an old friend of Twink and former girlfriend of Syd Barrett, went with Barrett to the gig and brought his guitar along, and jammed with them at one point. The next day, the Last Minute Put Together Boogie Band, with guests Fred Frith and Syd Barrett, played on a bill with Hawkwind and the Pink Fairies.

In the next two days, Twink formed the short-lived trio Stars with Barrett and Monck. Stars played a handful of well-received shows. However, Barrett, who was mentally fragile, quit after reading a negative review by Roy Hollingworth in Melody Maker. After Stars disbanded, Twink moved back to London.

=== 1972–1975 ===
From 1972 to 1975, Twink periodically performed with fellow Ladbroke Grove community band Hawkwind during the transition from the band's original drummer to its replacement Simon King. Twink also played with the band Glider but did not release recordings.

=== 1975 Pink Fairies reunion ===
In July 1975, the Pink Fairies staged a reunion gig at the Roundhouse, featuring the then-current line-up of Russell Hunter, Duncan Sanderson, and Larry Wallis, joined by former members Twink and Paul Rudolph. They released the recorded show as a live album in 1982.

=== The Rings and punk ===
Twink formed the Fallen Angels in August 1976 with Steve Marriott and former Allstars band members Greg Ridley and Mickey Finn. On the way to the band's first gig, a car accident left Twink hospitalised, after which this line-up disintegrated. The Fallen Angels wound up backing Phil May on a solo album. Twink then worked as a vocalist with the Rings in early 1977, releasing one of the first punk rock singles, "I Wanna Be Free", produced by former Sparks member Martin Gordon. Other members of the band included Alan Lee Shaw and Rod Latter of the Adverts. After Twink left, the other members of the Rings formed the Maniacs.

Twink coined the term "acid punk" to describe his music, and went on to release an EP called Do It '77 in February 1978. It included the songs "Psychedelic Punkeroo" (about Syd Barrett and songwriting credited to 'A. Syd') and "Enter The Diamonds", both of which featured a band comprising Twink (drums/lead vocals), Kid Rogers (of Kid Rogers and the Henchmen; guitars/vocals), Fingers Falkner (keyboards), and Chris Chesney (lead guitar). According to Twink, "It was the Psychedelic Punkaroo project, but Chiswick Records didn't like the track and I jammed 'Do It' with the Lightning Raiders, which they preferred". According to Duncan 'Danger Sun' Sanderson (bass, Lightning Raiders & ex-Pink Fairies), "Twink came round my house and dragged me down the studio while I was still asleep one morning, and Little John Hodge (lead guitar, Lightning Raiders) just came along to deliver a guitar. Twink had us jam through 'Do It', so we did it. Kid and John hadn't even heard the flaming song before. In the end, he jumps up and shouts 'That's it, thanks, lads!' We didn't even know it was being taped!" Twink responded that "A second take of 'Do It' was a contradiction". The EP was credited to Twink and the Fairies.

Twink next moved to Belgium, where he played drums on the recording of British punk rocker Elton Motello's Victims of Time album (1978, Pinball).

=== 1980s ===
After a long period of inactivity, Twink released a solo single in 1986 called "Apocalipstic", which inaugurated his new, self-titled record label and a run of new solo releases up to the early 1990s.

In 1987, he rejoined the Pink Fairies for a reunion album. During the subsequent Pink Fairies tour, Twink met members of Plasticland, which resulted in the collaboration You Need a Fairy Godmother, released in 1989 on Midnight Records. He also joined a brief lineup of 'Magic Muscle' in 1988 for a tour and a live album, and he released a collaborative album with The Bevis Frond in 1990.

=== 1990s ===
In 1990, Twink released his second solo album, Mr. Rainbow, with Robbie Gladwell on guitar and Andy Dowding on drums. Later in the decade, he collaborated with Hawkwind founder Nik Turner in the band PinkWind, writing about the semi-legendary Hawkwind/Pink Fairies jam sessions of the early 1970s. Turner brought in the Wind, and Twink provided the Pink. PinkWind released two albums (one credited to the HawkFairies). Some lineups also featured Judge Trev Thoms of Inner City Unit and Steve Took's Horns.

The Out of the Pink into the Blues album by 'Mouse & Twink: Fairies' was released around 1996 and "was recorded at the Pink Bridge [from the] mid-'70s till [the] '80s" by Twink and P. 'Mouse' Pracowik (Peter Pracownik of Astralasia) who were on guitar, Andrew Doran (vocals), Matthew Bailey (bass) and Chris Pinkerton (drums).

The 'Get Back' label released some archive collections from the Pink Fairies era. Twink's record label then released two 'Pink Fairies' albums recorded by Twink and Paul Rudolph in 1996/1997.

=== 2000 – present ===
In the early 2000s, Twink spent time in Los Angeles before settling in Marrakesh, Morocco.

2013 saw the re-release of Think Pink on the Sunbeam label in CD, vinyl, and digital formats. It predated a new release called You Reached for the Stars. It also included a collaboration with the Italian group the Technicolour Dream, featuring guest guitarist Brian Godding from Blossom Toes. The album was recorded in Rome and mastered at Abbey Road Studios by sound engineer Peter Mew, who also worked on the Pretty Things and Tomorrow recordings in the 1960s. In 2014, Twink started recording a new album, Think Pink II, with a similar concept of recording, featuring as many guests as on the original. The album was finished in 2015 and released in August the same year.

In spring 2018, under the band name Star Sponge Vision, Twink and Jon Povey released a concept album of music inspired by the poetry of Aleister Crowley, titled Crowley and Me.

He played for the first time ever the album 'Think Pink' in its entirety in 2018 with italian musician Emilio Sorridente. The session gave the idea for a film, 'The Pink Shell' released in 2025.

== Acting career ==
Twink appeared in the 1960s film Smashing Time with the other members of Tomorrow as the fictional band the Snarks. Tomorrow was also due to feature in Blowup, and even recorded a title song for the film, but was ultimately replaced by the Yardbirds. Similarly, Twink appeared with the Pretty Things under their pseudonym "Electric Banana" in the film What's Good for the Goose.

Twink also worked as an actor during the late 1980s, appearing in several United Kingdom television series, including:

- 'Allo 'Allo! a BBC1 British sitcom.
- David Copperfield, a 10-part serial adaptation of the Charles Dickens novel.
- Chocky's Challenge, which was based on Chocky, a science fiction novel by John Wyndham. The three Chocky series were produced by Thames Television.
- Lovejoy, a BBC series

== Discography ==
=== Studio albums ===
- Think Pink (Polydor Records/Sire Records; LP; 1970)
- Mr. Rainbow (Twink Records; CD/LP; 1990)
- Magic Eye (Woronzow; LP; 1990) (with the Bevis Frond)
- You Reached for the Stars (Sunbeam Records; CD/LP; 2013) (with the Technicolour Dream)
- Think Pink II (Sunbeam Records; CD; 2015)
- Think Pink III (VE Recordings; CD/LP; 2018)
- Sympathy for the Beast: Songs from the Poems of Aleister Crowley (Sunbeam Records; CD/LP; 2019) (with the Technicolour Dream)
- Think Pink IV: Return to Deep Space (Noiseagonymayhem Records; CD/LP; 2019) (with Moths & Locusts and Heavy Friends)

=== Live albums ===
- You Need a Fairy Godmother (Midnight Records; LP; 1989) (with Plasticland)
- Out of the Pink and Into the Blues (HTD Records; CD; 1995) (with Peter Pracownik as Mouse & Twink: Fairies)

=== Other solo albums ===
- Odds and Beginnings (Twink Records; LP; 1991) (primarily archival recordings, including outtakes and interviews. Featuring former Fairies colleagues Dane Stephens and Mick Weaver)
- From the Vaults (a.k.a. Odds & Beginnings Volume 2) (Get Back; LP; 1999) (primarily archival recordings. Includes some Pink Fairies tracks)
- The Lost Experimental Recordings 1970 (Get Back; CD/LP; 1999) (archival recordings)
- The Never Never Land and Think Pink Demos (Get Back; CD/LP; 2000) (archival recordings)
- Sound of Silk: Demos and Rarities (Twink Pink 50th; CD; 2017) (archival recordings)
- Psychedelic Electrician: 1969 Synthesizer Recordings (Think Pink 50th; CD; 2018) (archival recordings)

=== EPs and singles ===
- Do It '77 (Chiswick Records; 12" EP; 1978) (as Twink and The Fairies)
- "Apocalipstic" / "He's Crying" (Twink Records; 7" single; 1986) (with Elton Motello)
- Space Lover (Twink Records; 12" EP; 1986) (as Twink and The Fairies)
- "Driving My Car" / "Wargirl" (Twink Records; 7" single; 1987)
- "Psychedelic Punkeroo" / "Seize the Time" (Twink Records; 7" single; 1990)
- "Brand New Morning" / "Dreams Turn Into Rainbows" (Gare De Nord Records; 7" single; 2019)
- "10,000 Words in a Cardboard Box" / "Geraldine" (Misty Lane Records; 7" single; 2019) (split with Zion De Gallier, recorded 1999)

=== With the Fairies ===
- "Don't Think Twice It's Alright" / "Anytime at All" (Decca Records; 7" single; 1964)
- "Get Yourself Home" / "I'll Dance" (His Master's Voice; 7" single; 1964)
- "Don't Mind" / "Baby Don't" (His Master's Voice; 7" single; 1965)
- Get Yourself Home (The Early Years) (Think Pink 50th; CD; 2018) (archival recordings)

=== With Santa Barbara Machine Head ===
- Blues Anytime Vol. 3 (Immediate Records; LP; 1968)

=== With Tomorrow ===
- "My White Bicycle" / "Claramount Lake" (Parlophone Records; 7" single; 1967)
- Tomorrow (Parlophone Records/Sire Records; LP; 1968)
- 50 Minute Technicolor Dream (RPM Records; CD; 1998)

=== With the Pretty Things ===
- S.F. Sorrow (Columbia Records/Rare Earth Records; LP; 1968)
- The Pretty Things/Philippe DeBarge (Ugly Things Records; LP/CD; 2009) (recorded 1969)

=== With the Aquarian Age ===
- "10,000 Words in a Cardboard Box" / "Good Wizard Meets Naughty Wizard" (Parlophone Records; 7" single; 1968)

=== With Pink Fairies ===
- "The Snake" / "Do It" (Polydor Records; 7" single; 1971)
- Never Never Land (Polydor Records; LP; 1971)
- Live at the Roundhouse 1975 (Big Beat; LP; 1982)
- Kill 'Em and Eat 'Em (Demon Records; LP/CD; 1987)
- Pleasure Island (Twink Records; CD; 1996)
- No Picture (Twink Records; CD; 1997)
- The Golden Years: 1969-1971 (Cleopatra Records; CD; 1998)
- Mescaline and Mandies Round at Uncle Harry's (NMC; CD; 1998)
- Do It! (Total Energy; CD; 1999)
- Chinese Cowboys: Live 1987 (Captain Trip Records; LP; 2005)

=== With the Rings ===
- "I Wanna Be Free" / "Automobile" (Chiswick Records; 7" single; 1977)
- The Rings (NDN Records; 10" EP; 2017) (archival recordings)

=== Other collaborative albums ===
- Mona – The Carnivorous Circus (Transatlantic Records; LP; 1970) (with Mick Farren)
- One Hundred Miles Below (Big One Guitar; LP; 1989) (with Magic Muscle)
- Magic Eye (Woronzow; LP; 1990) (as Bevis and Twink)
- Crowley and Me (Mega Dodo; LP; 2018) (with Star Sponge Vision)
