= Phun City =

UK music festival

Coordinates: 50.83814°N 0.46521°W

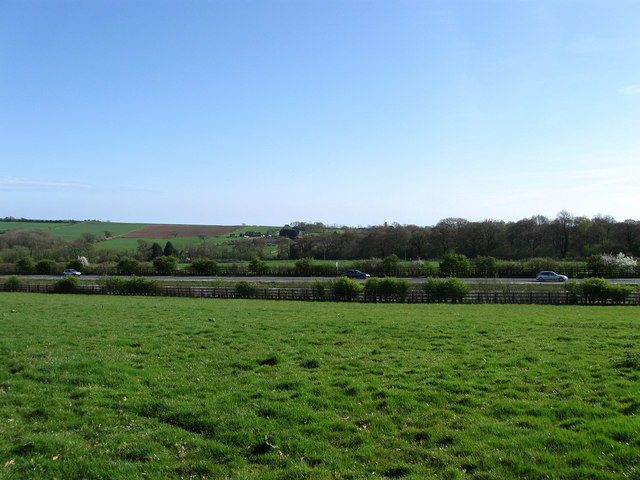
- Ecclesden Common near Worthing was the location for Phun City
- Genre: Rock, alternative rock
- Dates: 24–26 July 1970
- Locations: Ecclesden Common near Worthing, Sussex, England
- Years active: 1970
- Founders: Mick Farren

Phun City was a rock festival held at Ecclesden Common near Worthing, England, from 24 July to 26 July 1970. Following the planned one-day free concerts in London's Hyde Park, the Camden Free Festivals, and the Cambridge Free Festivals of the late Sixties, Phun City became an accidental free festival when funding was withdrawn shortly before the festival was held.

== History ==
Organised by the UK Underground anarchist Mick Farren and financed by Ronan O'Rahilly, the festival was not intended to be free, but funding was withdrawn a few days before the event. Rather than cancel it, the organisers told the scheduled bands who turned up that they would have to give their services for nothing. Remarkably, most of the acts stayed on. Free were billed to play, but withdrew – Farren later noted in his memoirs the irony of a band named Free refusing to play for free. Those who did appear included MC5, The Pretty Things, Kevin Ayers, Steve Peregrin Took's band Shagrat, Edgar Broughton Band, Mungo Jerry, Mighty Baby and Pink Fairies "who were taking all their clothes off as they played". The Beat Generation poet William Burroughs also appeared.

The Hells Angels – UK had been hired as the security force, but Farren said, "It slowly dawned on us that although none of our original plans had come together, we were no longer in control." Instead, the audience themselves were now in charge, with the organizers just making sure the bands came and went – it was, if somewhat inadvertently, the first large-scale "people's festival" held in the UK.

The poster art was by Edward Barker.

== Legacy ==
Camping at the festival, Worthing teenager Billy Idol saw MC5 play, saying later "I didn't realize it then but I had just seen the future of rock". Mick Jones of The Clash recalled: "That was the first time MC5 had played. My overriding memory was falling into a ditch! That was a great festival".

== See also ==
- Festivals in the United Kingdom
- List of historic rock festivals
- List of free festivals
