= Steve Peregrin Took =

English musician and songwriter (1949–1980)

Background information
- Also known as: Steve Porter; Shagrat the Vagrant
- Born: Stephen Ross Porter; 28 July 1949; Eltham, London, England
- Died: 27 October 1980 (aged 31) Notting Hill, London, England
- Genres: Rock; psychedelic pop
- Occupations: Musician; singer; songwriter
- Instruments: Vocals; guitar; bass guitar; drums; percussion
- Years active: 1967–1980
- Formerly of: Tyrannosaurus Rex; Shagrat; Steve Took's Horns

Steve Peregrin Took (born Stephen Ross Porter; 28 July 1949 – 27 October 1980) was an English musician and songwriter, best known for his membership of the duo Tyrannosaurus Rex with Marc Bolan. After breaking with Bolan, he concentrated on his own singer-songwriting activities, either as a solo artist or as a frontman for several bands.

== Career ==
=== Early life (1949–1967) and Tyrannosaurus Rex (1967–1969) ===
Took was born Stephen Ross Porter in Eltham, London, on 28 July 1949, and attended Shooters Hill School. He took his name from the character Peregrin Took, a hobbit in J. R. R. Tolkien's The Lord of the Rings. At the age of 17, having played drums for some months with a mod band named the Waterproof Sparrows (bass player John Rains, guitarists Pete Keen and Wally Woodcock), he answered an advertisement in International Times for Tyrannosaurus Rex, the electric band that Marc Bolan was forming following his departure from John's Children. After one disastrous concert at the Electric Garden in London, Bolan and Took reduced the band to a duo, busking in subways on acoustic guitar and bongos, Took having been obliged to sell his full drum kit to pay the rent until paying gigs started to come in.

The flower-power unit, championed by John Peel onto the club and stage circuit and thence into the record shops, released three albums and achieved two top 40 hits. Took contributed harmony backing vocals, which are more noticeable in live recordings than on studio recordings, and provided bongos, African drums, kazoo, pixiphone, and Chinese gong. Took's arrangements contributed to transforming Bolan's music from the straightforward rock 'n roll it had previously been into an exotic brew of musical styles designed to appeal to Bolan's new audience of hippies. Towards the end of his time in the band, as Bolan began returning to the electric guitar, Took returned to a full drum set and also contributed some bass guitar parts.

The band's producer Tony Visconti credited Took with much of the sound and success of Tyrannosaurus Rex. In an interview for the documentary Marc Bolan: The Final Word, Visconti opined that "Marc and Steve were a true 50:50 partnership. Steve was a remarkable musician, he could play many instruments. He played percussion, he could pick up a bass or a guitar. He would also sometimes play some cello parts. And then his backing vocals were great too."

Took developed his own songwriting and in early 1969, with recording just complete on Tyrannosaurus Rex's third LP, Unicorn, Took suggested to Bolan that the duo could perform some of his own material; Bolan refused. By this time, their lifestyles were in direct conflict. Bolan was living quietly with wife-to-be June Child, while Took was rapidly forging links with "revolutionary" underground acts, such as the Deviants and the Pretty Things. The relationship was deteriorating badly—Bolan barely tolerated Took's drug use, and Steve Mann recalled that it was clear they "cordially detested each other".

In addition, Took's friendship with Bolan's idol Syd Barrett had also developed through their shared interests in both LSD and "strange musical noises". Mick Farren, in his memoir Give The Anarchist A Cigarette, recalled that Took would "drag a bemused Syd Barrett along" to events in Ladbroke Grove in the late 1960s; Took remained friends with Barrett well into the 1970s. Took worked with Syd Barrett on unreleased "Ramadan" tracks. While in Tyrannosaurus Rex, Took also appeared as a backing vocalist on a session for David Bowie, the results of which can be heard on the BBC sessions album Bowie at the Beeb.

Eventually, Took donated two of his songs—"Three Little Piggies" and "The Sparrow Is A Sign"—to former Tomorrow and Pretty Things drummer Twink's 1969 solo album, Think Pink. Consequently, before the first Tyrannosaurus Rex tour of America, Bolan and his management gave Took notice that they would be sacking him once the tour was complete. Another contributing factor was an incident at the launch party for the UK edition of Rolling Stone, where jugs of punch prepared for the event were spiked with the hallucinogen STP. Took had already earned himself the nickname "The Phantom Spiker" (in which he rejoiced) through previous similar pranks. Bolan was severely affected by the spiked drink and considered Took to be the prime suspect.

Took was contractually obliged to go on the US tour, but his heart was not in it and he attempted to cope through taking drugs. Additionally, the acoustic duo were overshadowed by the loud electric acts they were billed with. To counter this, he drew from the shock rock style of Iggy Pop; as Took explained to the NME in 1972 "I took my shirt off in the Sunset Strip where we were playing and whipped myself till everybody shut up. With a belt, y'know, a bit of blood and the whole of Los Angeles shuts up. 'What's going on, man, there's some nutter attacking himself on stage.' I mean, Iggy Stooge had the same basic approach." This allowed the management to claim subsequently that it was Took's behaviour on stage which had caused the sacking. Bolan replaced Took with Mickey Finn, and after one further album renamed the duo T. Rex, later expanding to a full band again.

=== Pink Fairies (1969–1970) ===
After being sacked by Bolan, Took formed a prototype version of the Pink Fairies with Twink and Mick Farren, recently ousted from his own band, the Deviants. This band was named in honour of a drinking club of the same name the three had formed earlier that year, along with other leading lights of the underground scene. Together with Twink's girlfriend Silva Darling, they performed what Farren would later describe as "less of a gig than a protracted harangue" at the University of Manchester in October 1969, which rapidly dissolved into chaos. Took appeared prominently on Farren's first solo album Mona – The Carnivorous Circus (recorded December 1969, released 1970) on which he was credited as Shagrat The Vagrant. Twink and the other ex-Deviants then formed a new band called the Pink Fairies (mark 2), without Took or Farren.

=== Shagrat (1970–1971) ===
In February 1970, Farren and Took headhunted guitarist Larry (or "Lazza") Wallis and bassist Tim Taylor from their underground band, the Entire Sioux Nation. A month later, Farren dropped out, leaving Took in the role of bandleader for the first time in his career. With the addition of drummer Phil Lenoir, Shagrat was formed (named after an orc in The Lord of the Rings). They recorded three tracks, "Peppermint Flickstick", "Boo! I Said Freeze" and "Steel Abortion", at Strawberry Studios and played live at the Phun City festival, before Lenoir and Taylor left. Took and Wallis continued with drummer Dave Bidwell, rehearsing with various bass players and eventually forming an acoustic trio of Took on vocals and guitar, Wallis on acoustic bass and Bidwell on tambourine. This line-up recorded a set of (at least) four home demos, "Amanda", "Strange Sister", "Still Yawning Stillborn" and "Beautiful Deceiver", at Wallis's father's home studio in South London, which in the 1990s would be paired with the earlier electric studio session for limited edition vinyl release and later a CD album release in 2001.

Wallis would later take over the leadership of the Pink Fairies for their Kings of Oblivion LP, substantially transforming the sound and style of the band. He and Took would work together again at various intervals in 1972, 1975–1976 and 1977.

=== Solo acoustic performer (1971–1972) ===
With Wallis and Bidwell otherwise committed to UFO and Savoy Brown respectively, the acoustic Shagrat was effectively reduced down to just Took himself performing solo on an acoustic guitar, usually sitting on a stool interspersing his songs with jokes and other onstage monologues. In this format, Took made some headway as a live performer. "Tookie" appeared in frequent support slots for Hawkwind and the Pink Fairies, attracting some coverage in the UK music press and even performing a live session on Steve Bradshaw's Breakthrough programme on BBC Radio London. In December 1971, he headlined a three-date mini-tour of southwest England. As well as the Pink Fairies and Hawkwind, during this period Took's solo show was also an opening act for, among others, the MC5, Stealers Wheel, Skid Row and Barclay James Harvest.

He also performed at various benefit events, including the "Nasty Balls" benefits for the Nasty Tales magazine (whose editors, including Farren, were on trial for obscenity) as well as the 1972 Campaign for Nuclear Disarmament festival at Aldermaston, Steve's account of which was reprinted by Charles Shaar Murray in his book Shots From The Hip. Writing for the NME in 1972, Murray described Took and his stage act thus: "Most people know who Steve Peregrine Took is, but few people know what he does. A few more know him as a somewhat bizarre figure who materialises at concerts, armed only with an Epiphone guitar, and performs a freeform set of songs, raps, jokes and anything else that flashes through his mind."

During this time, Took could also often be seen participating in jamming sessions during encores at Hawkwind and Pink Fairies concerts. His contributions to these jams were in the role of third drummer, and he also once played bass guitar for the "Pinks", substituting for Duncan Sanderson.

=== Management by Tony Secunda (1972–1973) ===
During 1972, Took was approached by Tony Secunda, recently fired as manager for T. Rex, with a view to recovering royalties owed to Took from the Tyrannosaurus Rex years. Emerging from these conversations, Secunda became Took's manager, with a view to leading him to stardom to spite Bolan. Initially, Took attempted to rerecord as a single the song "Amanda" from the 1971 acoustic Shagrat session (along with two other tracks, "Blind Owl Blues" and "Mr Discrete") with the assistance of the Pink Fairies' rhythm section of Sanderson and Russell Hunter, whose band was temporarily defunct following the departure of Paul Rudolph. During this session, former Junior's Eyes/Bowie guitarist Mick Wayne was recruited as guitarist.

However, none of these tracks were ever completed to Took's satisfaction, due to what Wayne later described as "dope-induced thinking" and consequently, Wayne, Sanderson and Hunter formed a new incarnation of the Pink Fairies. (Wayne was quickly supplanted by Wallis, leading to the Kings of Oblivion era as detailed above). Took and Secunda, meanwhile, embarked upon a different approach.

Took moved into a basement flat beneath Secunda's Mayfair offices, which he set up as a live-in recording studio to demo material at his own ease. The flat rapidly became a magnet for the cream of musicians on the underground scene, who would contribute to the recordings while visiting Took. As well as old colleagues from Hawkwind and the Pink Fairies, Secunda reported that Took received visits from Syd Barrett, who at the time was living in Cambridge, but would shortly relocate back to London. From Secunda's account, it would appear likely that Barrett is on the recordings done in the flat by Took and his friends.

Highlights of the session tapes were eventually released by Cleopatra Records in 1995, as The Missing Link To Tyrannosaurus Rex. A new version of the 1971 acoustic Shagrat song "Beautiful Deceiver" is tracklisted on the CD as "Syd's Wine" and a credit for guitar and other noises is given to one Crazy Diamond, an allusion to the 1975 Pink Floyd track "Shine On You Crazy Diamond", written in tribute to Barrett. Stripped down versions of the track "Syd's Wine" reveal a second guitarist in the room and audible vocal noises.

=== Various projects (1973–1976) ===
After splitting with Secunda, Took worked with a number of Hawkwind members, most notably Robert Calvert, Adrian Wagner, and Nik Turner. Took was scheduled to be the support act for Calvert's cancelled "Captain Lockheed and the Starfighters" tour. He and Bidwell formed at least two bands, the first with guitarist Eisuke Takahashi, the second with guitarist Hiroshi Kato and future Hawkwind bassist Adrian Shaw. The latter line-up recorded a session of four tracks in summer 1974, including "Flophouse Blues" (previously recorded twice in the 1972 Secunda sessions).

For some time around 1975, Took lived in the Kent towns of Canterbury and Margate, where he took on local musician and promoter Les Best as his manager. While down there, Took formed a new band, Jolly Roger and the Crimson Gash, with Takahashi now on bass and two local musicians, Bryan East on drums and a guitarist called Phil. This band gigged locally and recorded at least four tracks, produced by Turner at his home studio in Westgate on Sea.

=== Steve Took's Horns (1976–1978) ===
By 1976, Took was back in London and using the band name Steve Took's Horns, so called after a horned pendant which he habitually wore. By mid-1977, this had solidified into a steady line-up featuring, in what would be the first of several bands together over many years, Trev Thoms and Ermanno Ghisio-Erba, later better known to Inner City Unit (ICU) fans as Judge Trev and Dino Ferari.

This group, managed by Turner's friend since adolescence Tony Landau, recorded a session of three studio tracks – "It's Over", "Average Man" and "Woman I Need" – at Pathway Studios on 29 November 1977, before going on to perform a gig on 18 June 1978 at The Roundhouse, as part of "Nik Turner's Bohemian Love-In". Took felt the gig went badly, and decided to split up the band. The Pathway Studios session would be released on CD by Cherry Red in 2004, as Blow It!!! The All New Adventures of Steve Took's Horns, with the CD also featuring out-takes, remixes and fresh recordings of two other Took songs – "Ooh My Heart" and "Too Bad" – which the Horns had also been rehearsing back in 1977–1978.

=== Involvement with Inner City Unit (1979–1980) ===
Despite the break-up, Steve Took's Horns had made a considerable impression on Took's circle of acquaintances. Consequently, Nik Turner, having first drafted Ghisio-Erba/Ferari into his band Sphynx for a live festival LP recorded that August, went on in 1979 to incorporate the Thoms/Ghisio-Erba partnership into his new Inner City Unit.

Took guested with ICU a number of times, reuniting with his old Horns sidemen; the last recorded dates being 16 June 1980 at London's Music Machine and sometime around 21 June 1980 at the Stonehenge Free Festival in Wiltshire – a festival frequented by other 'Festival Bands', most famously Took's old Ladbroke Grove cohorts Hawkwind. Bootleg recordings exist of the Music Machine show and also an open-air performance on 6 May 1980 at Meanwhile Gardens in Westbourne Park, on both of which Took can be heard performing lead vocals on a cover of the Beatles' version of Larry Williams' "Slow Down"

== Personal life ==
Took had one son in the early 1970s with partner Lou Tunstall, later the partner of Tony Landau. Took's other girlfriends included chronologically, Angie (1969–1971), Tracy Inder (1974–1976), Gertrude de Freyne (1977–1978) and Valerie "Sam" Billiet (1979–1980). As well as his own son, Steve Took was stepfather to Lemmy's son Paul Inder (to Tracy Inder), as he later was to Billiet's daughter.

== Death ==
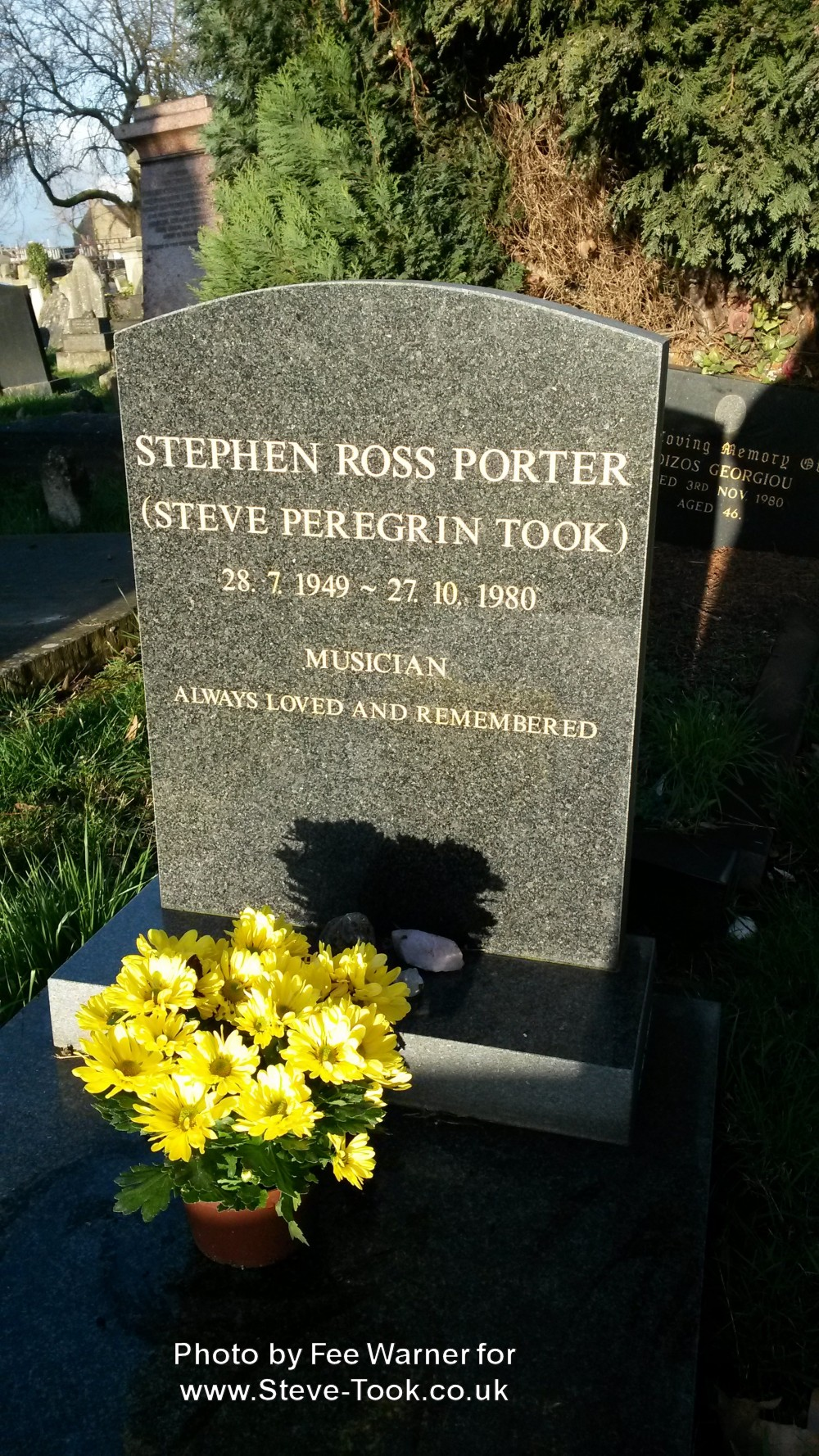
Steve Peregrin Took's Grave at Kensal Green Cemetery, London, in February 2014

Took died on 27 October 1980, in Notting Hill, London, in the maisonette he shared with Billiet and her young daughter. He was 31 years old. As a consequence of intervention by Best, now once again Took's manager, royalty cheques for the Tyrannosaurus Rex 'Blue Thumb' American releases had been arriving periodically and Took had received one that week. The day prior to his death, Took purchased morphine and hallucinogenic mushrooms for himself and Billiet, and the evening before Took died, they both injected themselves with the morphine.

Took's death certificate records the cause of death as being asphyxiation after inhaling a cocktail cherry. Drugs were not listed as a contributory factor, even though Took's death is often cited as a "drugs misadventure". He was buried in Kensal Green Cemetery.

== Discography ==
- 1970 – Mick Farren – Mona – The Carnivorous Circus featuring Steve Took as 'Shagrat the Vagrant' (Transatlantic Records)
- 1970 – David Bowie – The World of David Bowie (Played pixiephone, contribution recorded circa 1968) (Decca Records)
- 1971 – Twink – Think Pink (LP feat. two Took songs, recorded summer 1969) (Sire Records/Polydor)
- 1990 – Shagrat – "Amanda" (b/w "Peppermint Flickstick") 7" single (Shagrat Records, distributed by Pyg Track)
- 1992 – Steve Took's Shagrat – Nothing Exceeds Like Excess 12" EP, sleeve by Edward Barker (Shagrat Records, distributed by Pyg Track)
- 1995 – Steve Peregrine Took – The Missing Link to Tyrannosaurus Rex CD (Cleopatra) re-released 2002 as Crazy Diamond CD (Voiceprint)
- 2001 – Steve Peregrine Took's Shagrat – Lone Star CD (Captain Trip Records) re-released 2016, credited to "Shagrat feat. Steve Peregrin Took & Larry Wallis" on CD, 300 copy limited edition vinyl & Bandcamp with bonus tracks taken from above "The Missing Link ..." release (Purple Pyramid – subdivision of Cleopatra)
- 2001 – Shagrat – Pink Jackets Required CD (Get Back)
- 2004 – Steve Took's Horns – Blow It!!! The All New Adventures Of Steve Took's Horns CD (Cherry Red Records)
- 2007 – Robert Calvert - Lucky Leif and the Longships new CD edition of 1975 LP, bonus tracks: shelved 1974 single A & B sides by Bob Calvert's First XI including Took (Eclectic Discs)

== Concert tours ==
=== Headlining ===
Community Music tour of Devon/Cornwall – three dates December 1971 (two as outright headline, one as co-headline with Stealers Wheel)

=== Opening act ===
(Took, as a solo performer, was scheduled to have been the opening act on Bob Calvert's cancelled 1974 Captain Lockheed UK tour.)

== Equipment ==
As a singer songwriter, Took's two main guitars were an Epiphone acoustic guitar decorated with stickers (including one of Eddie Cochran) used for solo work, last known to have been in the possession of Billiet, and an electric Rickenbacker used as a rhythm guitar with Took's electric bands, currently owned by Best. Both guitars feature prominently in Keith Morris' early 1970s publicity photographs of Took.

Previously as a member of Tyrannosaurus Rex, Took's percussion and other equipment included bongos, tabla, finger cymbals, African talking drum, kazoos, a Chinese gong and a Pixiphone (toy xylophone). As the duo reverted to electric music in early 1969, Took also played a Höfner 500/1 bass and a Chad Valley toy drumkit. In later years, when performing solo support gigs for Hawkwind, Took would often include his bongos as part of his equipment so that, later in the evening, he could guest with Hawkwind on a few songs in their set.
