= Larry Wallis =

British rock musician (1949–2019)

- Wallis as he appears on the cover of the 1978 single "Police Car / On Parole"

Background information
- Born: 19 May 1949
- Origin: England
- Died: 19 September 2019 (aged 70)
- Genres: Rock, hard rock, heavy metal, proto-punk, psychedelic rock, progressive rock
- Occupations: Musician, record producer, songwriter
- Instruments: Guitar; vocals
- Years active: 1968–2019
- Formerly of: Shagrat; Pink Fairies; UFO; Motörhead

Larry Wallis (19 May 1949 – 19 September 2019) was a British rock guitarist, songwriter and producer. He was best known as a member of the Pink Fairies and an early member of Motörhead.

== Biography ==
=== Early bands ===
In 1968, he formed a band called The Entire Sioux Nation with Terry Nolder on vocals, Tim Taylor on bass, and Paul Nichols on drums (born in 1949). The band split up in late 1969.

=== Shagrat (Steve Peregrin Took - first time) ===
Steve Peregrin Took and Mick Farren formed Shagrat with Wallis and his ex-Entire Sioux Nation bandmate Taylor in February 1970. Previously, Took and Farren had been with Twink and girlfriend Sally "Silver Darling" Melzer in a prototype Pink Fairies line-up in 1969. Twink and Melzer left the band, and Twink formed Pink Fairies Mark 2 in February 1970 with Farren's former bandmates from The Deviants. The Deviants had just returned to Britain after sacking Farren in Canada in late 1969, leaving Farren bandless, and then found themselves stranded in North America for several months. Very soon, though, Farren left after having a falling-out with Took.

Shagrat thus became Took's band outright. Took, Wallis and Taylor were joined by drummer Phil Lenoir, formerly of Black Cat Bones. This line-up recorded three tracks at Strawberry Studios in Stockport and played one gig at the Phun City Festival in July 1970 before Taylor and Lenoir left. Took and Wallis carried on with drummer Dave Bidwell, and in early 1971 the trio recorded four acoustic Took songs. All seven tracks were released in the early 1990s on limited edition vinyl and were later compiled together on the CD Lone Star in 2001 by Japanese label Captain Trip Records, later re-released in 2016 on Cleopatra Records with bonus tracks from the 1972 sessions described below.

=== Blodwyn Pig, UFO and Steve Peregrin Took (second time) ===
Wallis then joined Blodwyn Pig, which changed its name to Lancaster's Bombers (later shortened to Lancaster) with Jack Lancaster. They were a short-lived band, though they toured in support of Yes in 1971.

In February 1972, Wallis joined UFO, but left in October 1972 after touring Europe. Wallis did not record with the band, although a bootlegged live recording of a UFO performance featuring Wallis is known to exist, as does a black and white kinescope print of a live set on French TV show Rock En Stock, which included a version of Eddie Cochrane's Rockabilly standard, "C'mon Everybody", which the band had covered on UFO 1.

On unknown dates in 1972, Wallis recorded further sessions with Steve Peregrin Took at a basement flat below Tony Secunda's office in Mayfair. These very casual sessions contain appearances by Twink, Mick Wayne and Duncan Sanderson, with Syd Barrett also having been reported to being a contributor to the sessions, although the extent of his involvement in them is unconfirmed. Material from these sessions was released in 1995 as The Missing Link To Tyrannosaurus Rex, a posthumous Took solo album on Cleopatra Records.

=== The Pink Fairies ===
In November 1972, Wallis joined the Pink Fairies, substituting for Mick Wayne. The band released an album Kings of Oblivion which contained mostly Wallis-penned tracks. The band played with an extended line-up for a special gig in July 1975. Several years later, in 1982, their only live performance was released as Live at the Roundhouse 1975. In 1991, it was reissued under the name At the Roundhouse/Previously Unreleased, comprising the original live album, plus additional songs by Larry Wallis from 1984, and an EP by Twink from 1977.

=== Motörhead ===
While still a member of the Pink Fairies, in May 1975 Wallis joined a new power trio outfit, Motörhead, with Hawkwind's Lemmy and Lucas Fox. In September 1975 Fox left the band, and Motörhead recruited a new drummer, Phil "Philthy Animal" Taylor. Wallis recorded an album with the band, On Parole, which remained unreleased until 1979, by which time Motörhead had established some reputation for themselves. In February 1976 Wallis was joined by "Fast" Eddie Clarke on guitar, and later in the same month, Wallis left Motörhead.

=== Steve Peregrin Took (third and fourth time) ===
During 1975 and 1976, Wallis did further recording work with Took although none of these sessions have been released to date. Wallis was present, by chance, at Pathway Studios on 29 November 1977 when Steve Took's Horns recorded material which would eventually be released in 2004.

=== Stiff Records - performer and producer ===
Wallis remained with Pink Fairies, which continued as a trio, until July 1976 when they gained additional guitarist, Martin Stone. In September 1976 the band released a single, "Between the Lines"/"Spoiling for a Fight" on Stiff Records. Four months later in January 1977 the band split up. In the same month Wallis guested at a one-off gig with members of Thin Lizzy and Rat Scabies of The Damned.

Wallis then became an in-house producer at Stiff Records. He released a solo single, "Police Car"/"On Parole" produced by Nick Lowe, and backed by two members of Eddie And The Hot Rods; bassist Paul Gray, and drummer Steve Nicol. "Police Car" has been covered by The Members and Snips. As well as appearing on a compilation album A Bunch of Stiff Records, Wallis was part of an ad hoc line-up called The Takeaways which included Dave Edmunds, Nick Lowe and Sean Tyla. Wallis took part in the Live Stiffs Tour in 1977 and appears as 'Larry Wallis' Psychedelic Rowdies' on the album, Live Stiffs Live, that was released later that year.

Wallis also produced albums for a number of Stiff Records artists including Wreckless Eric, The Adverts and Mick Farren's EP Screwed Up (November 1977) and album Vampires Stole My Lunch Money (August 1978). His song, "As Long As The Price is Right", first appeared on Dr. Feelgood's 1977 album, Be Seeing You; and a live version of the track was later issued as a single in April 1979.

In 1980, Wallis recorded an album for Stiff Records but it was left unreleased when Wallis refused to sign a seven-album contract with the label and was consequently dropped. Individual tracks have surfaced on various compilations or were rerecorded by Wallis for subsequent projects.

=== Farren/MC5 collaborations and his own bands ===
In September 1978, Wallis became a member of another Farren project Mick Farren & The Good Guys; featuring Mick Farren (vocals), Andy Colquhoun (guitar, later of Brian James ' post punk garage band, Tanz Der Youth ), Willy Stallybrass (harmonica), Gary Tibbs ( bassist for Chris Spedding, Adam and the Ants and Roxy Music) and Alan Powell (drums) (from Hawkwind).

In March 1979 Wallis joined ex-MC5 band member Wayne Kramer, Andy Colquhoun and George Butler for a series of live gigs.

In February 1982 Wallis formed Larry Wallis & The Death Commandos of Love with Johnny Reverb on guitar, Big George Webley on bass and Jim Toomey on drums. This line-up was short-lived and Wallis soon began playing a regular series of gigs, mostly at Dingwalls, with a line-up completed by Duncan Sanderson, Andy Colquhoun and George Butler. This line-up began life as 'The Police Cars', playing a Christmas gig as The Police Sleighs before using a large number of aliases such as The Pearl Divers of Death, The Starry Smoothounds, The Knob Artists, The Death Commandoes of Love, The Donut Dunkers of Death (as support to The Deviants, but actually the same band with Mick Farren on vocals) before settling on the more permanent Love Pirates of Doom. This line-up lasted up until the 1987 Pink Fairies reunion, though in 1986 Sanderson was replaced by another bassist called Tony.

In 1984 Wallis was once again working with Mick Farren, who resurrected The Deviants name to record a live album, Human Garbage, featuring Mick Farren on vocals, Wayne Kramer and Wallis on guitars, Duncan Sanderson on bass and vocals, and George Butler on drums.

=== Pink Fairies resurrection ===
In 1987 the Pink Fairies were revived with Wallis on guitar and vocals, Andy Colquhoun on guitar, Duncan Sanderson on bass and vocals, and both Twink and Russell Hunter on drums. This resulted in the album Kill 'Em and Eat 'Em. By 1988 Twink had left the band, who continued to gig sporadically, even playing European gigs in Germany and France, until Wallis too left. A final throw of the dice took place on 5 March 1989 at the Bob Calvert Memorial show in Brixton Academy under the umbrellas name 'Pink Fairies Psychedelic Revue' though in reality this comprised separate sets from Flying Colours (Sanderson, Hunter, Colquhoun) and Larry Wallis' Bandanna Club, featuring various friends such as Pete Thomas (drums) and Canvey Islands Kennedy brothers,

=== Dr. Feelgood links ===
Around 1991 Wallis worked with Lee Brilleaux and Phil Mitchell (both from Dr. Feelgood) on the On The Bench recording, with Ian Gibbons. This led to the formation of Wallis's new band, The Redbirds, featuring Wallis (guitar, vocals), Mitchell (bass) and Chris North (drums). The Redbirds released one 12 inch EP, Truth, Justice and a Wholesome Packed Lunch. Wallis also wrote many songs that Dr. Feelgood later performed, such as "As Long as the Price is Right", "Punch Drunk", "Talk of the Devil", and "Can't Find the Lady", among others.

=== Back in business ===
2001 saw the first Wallis solo album to reach release stage, Death in the Guitarfternoon. A comeback gig for The Fairies was planned for The Roundhouse, Chalk Farm, London on 22 January 2007, however, this was cancelled due to Wallis having a trapped nerve in his back. It was never rescheduled.

=== Death ===
Wallis died on 19 September 2019, aged 70.

== Discography ==
Albums with the Pink Fairies, The Deviants and Mick Farren

- Pink Fairies – Kings of Oblivion – June 1973
- Pink Fairies – Flashback – July 1975 (compilation)
- Mick Farren and the Deviants – Screwed Up – November 1977 (EP produced by Wallis)
- Mick Farren – Vampires Stole My Lunch Money – August 1978 (produced by Wallis)
- Pink Fairies – Live at the Roundhouse 1975 – June 1982
- Pink Fairies – Previously Unreleased – 1982
- The Deviants – Human Garbage – 1984
- Pink Fairies – Kill 'Em and Eat 'Em – 1987
- Pink Fairies – At the Roundhouse/Previously Unreleased – 1991
- The Deviants – Fragments of Broken Probes – 1998 with Jack Lancaster, Andy Colquhoun
- The Deviants – The Deviants Have Left the Planet – 1999, with Jack Lancaster

Albums with the 'Live Stiffs' package

- Stiffs Live – 1978 - Larry Wallis' Psychedelic Rowdies - "Police Car", and with Nick Lowe - "I Knew the Bride" and "Let's Eat"

As a member of Motörhead

- On Parole – 1979

Solo singles

- "Police Car"/"On Parole" - 1977
- "Leather Forever"/"Seeing Double" – 1984

Albums with On The Beach

- Escape From Oil City – 1991 album shared with Canvey Island All Stars with Lee Brilleaux and Phil Mitchell

12 inch EP as Larry Wallis and the Redbyrds

- Truth, Justice and a Wholesome Packed Lunch – Shagrat Records, distributed by Pyg Track, 1991

Albums with The Stranglers and Friends

- Live in Concert – 1995

Solo Albums

- Death in the Guitarfternoon - 2001
- The Sound of Speed - 2017 (planned date; officially unreleased)

Various Artists

- A Bunch of Stiff Records – 1977 – one track by The Takeaways – "Food"
- Hits Greatest Stiffs – 1979 – one track by the Pink Fairies – "Between the Lines"
- What's In the Pub in 1996 – 1995 – one track by Wallis – "Touch and Go"

=== Albums produced by Larry Wallis ===
- Wreckless Eric – A Louder Silence – 1977
- Wreckless Eric – Wreckless Eric – 1978 (Wallis also plays guitar)
