= Shagrat (band) =

British music supergroup

- Origin: London, England
- Genres: Psychedelic rock; acid rock; proto-punk; acoustic rock
- Years active: 1970–1971
- Labels: Purple Pyramid; Captain Trip; Shagrat Records
- Past members: Steve Peregrin Took; Larry Wallis; Tim Taylor; Phil Lenoir; Dave Bidwell; Mick Farren

Shagrat was a British supergroup formed by Steve Peregrin Took and Mick Farren in February 1970 after they split with Twink, their partner in the prototype Pink Fairies supergroup of late 1969. They recruited Larry Wallis (guitar, backing vocals) and Tim Taylor (bass), both formerly of The Entire Sioux Nation. Farren left the band shortly after its establishment and never recorded or performed with them (although he gave some press interviews on the formative band's behalf during this time). Shagrat then became Took's band outright with Wallis, Taylor, Phil Lenoir (drums), and later Dave Bidwell (percussion).

As well as being an offshoot of the birth of the original Pink Fairies incarnation of 1970–1972, Shagrat set the template for Took's solo/frontman career (into which the band eventually mutated). Shagrat also proved to be an ancestor of both the 1973 Pink Fairies incarnation which recorded the Kings Of Oblivion album and also the founding Motörhead incarnation which recorded On Parole, in both cases after Farren recommended Wallis, based on his guitar playing with Shagrat, respectively to the Fairies as a guitarist/singer and to Lemmy as a guitarist.

Took discussed the band retrospectively in the NME and it would much later receive coverage in Rockerilla, Record Collector and Classic Rock

== Origin of the name ==
The band was named after the Orc Shagrat from The Lord of the Rings and was a contraction of 'Shagrat The Vagrant', the name under which Steve Took had been credited on Mick Farren's album Mona – The Carnivorous Circus. In 1991, Larry Wallis gave an alternative explanation. "'Steve Took' was Steve Took's real name as far as we were concerned, so he decided to take on another persona, 'Shagrat' who was the guy with the slanty eyes, pointed beard and the suede shoes."

Interviewed in 1972, Took himself offered yet another explanation: "I am gutter Rock, I'm a schneide. That's why I had Shagrat – it was a rat trip. Rats turn over at an amazing pace and they have a lot of kids. Not only do they eat the poison but they thrive on it and get bigger and they can still slip under doorways. It's the ecology trip. Do you know how many rats were killed in New York last year? 'Cos I don't! Hah! I can't remember my figures."

== Career ==
At Strawberry Studios in Stockport, they recorded a session, produced by Wallis's father, consisting of three tracks, "Peppermint Flickstick", "Boo! I Said Freeze" and "Steel Abortion". Having been previously scheduled to appear at the May 1970 Hollywood Music Festival in Newcastle-under-Lyme, the band finally undertook their first gig, at the Phun City Festival near Worthing, Sussex on 24–26 July 1970. The band (minus Taylor, with Took playing bass) played a 30–45 minute set, including all three songs from the Strawberry Studios session plus a cover of "7 and 7 Is" by Love. The gig had certainly got the band off to a good start, but problems set in immediately afterwards. Phil Lenoir left (Took claimed that they never saw him again after the festival), leaving Shagrat in search of a new rhythm section.

A new drummer was recruited, Chicken Shack's Dave Bidwell, while Took continued with bass guitar. They continued to rehearse together sometimes alongside prospective bassists, in preparation for a 13 December 1970 live date at the Roundhouse Christmas Spaced Party event which had been booked and they received approaches from several record labels. Shagrat's eventual demise resulted from Took being the band's only full-time member. Bidwell was one of three Chicken Shack members who, during 1970, transferred to Savoy Brown. Wallis meanwhile joined Blodwyn Pig and later UFO.

With the Roundhouse gig booking looming, and Took not wishing to cancel, his only option was to play the gig by himself, which he did. Wallis and Bidwell in early 1971 assisted Took in the recording of a set of four acoustic demos, – "Amanda", "Strange Sister", "Still Yawning Stillborn" and "Beautiful Deceiver". The trio also rehearsed for possible live performances as an acoustic band, which Wallis recalled involved Bidwell "pounding (the) fuck out of a telephone book."

== Legacy and retrospect ==
Following a positive reaction to Took's solo performance in lieu of a Shagrat band set at the Roundhouse, he continued with the solo format. Took made some headway as a live act, frequently supporting the Pink Fairies and Hawkwind, attracting some coverage in the UK music press and even performing a live radio session on Steve Bradshaw's Breakthrough programme on BBC Radio London. Took continued to make use of the Shagrat bandname by occasionally billing himself as 'Steve Shagrat Took' – notably on advertisements for his support slot for Hawkwind at Chatham Central Hall on 18 November 1971.

Wallis' guitar work for Shagrat earned him Farren's recommendation in 1972 as the new guitarist/frontman for the Pink Fairies. Following Paul Rudolph's departure from the band, remaining members Duncan Sanderson and Russell Hunter had been working with Took on a rerecording of acoustic Shagrat song "Amanda" as a possible single. Longtime Took friend Mick Wayne happened to be in the studios at the time and was roped into the session on guitar. Afterwards, Wayne, Sanderson and Hunter formed a new Pink Fairies lineup which recorded the single "Well Well Well." Unhappy at Wayne's songwriting and playing style however, the other two Fairies approached Farren to nominate a successor. Farren's choice was Wallis and he repeated this choice two and a half years later when asked by Lemmy to suggest a guitarist for the founding lineup of Motörhead. The two band incarnations featuring Wallis recorded the Kings Of Oblivion and On Parole albums respectively. This was to be the start of a long personal and professional relationship between Wallis and Farren, which encompassed Wallis' production work and co-songwriting on Farren's second solo album Vampires Stole My Lunch Money. The partnership was renewed in late 2001 when Wallis provided musical backing at Farren's reading of his memoir Give The Anarchist A Cigarrette at London pub Filthy McNasty's.

Looking back on Shagrat in 1972, Took opined that the band had suffered from being ahead of its time. Interviewed by Charles Shaar Murray in 1972 for the NME, Took commented that record companies "didn't want to buy Steel Abortion or Peppermint Flickstick. A bit naughty, the words, but then I'd taken in all this American culture and American society in general, and got chemicalised out of it, a general trip, and put it all into words. Now there's Alice Cooper's School's Out and Killer, Hawkwind and the general thing is there now, and it wasn't there then because they couldn't accept that it was gonna sell. I was saying to 'em. "Look, man, look at the Yanks, because we're about three years behind them as far as youth culture is concerned. This is what's gonna sell." and they'd say, 'Oh yes, lads sure, do they really want to hear this sort of thing?"

== Critical reception ==
Classic Rock's Michael Heatley awarded Captain Trip Records' 2001 Lone Star album release of Shagrat's studio sessions three stars out of five in the November 2001 edition, commenting "They sound rather like Marc Bolan fronting Hawkwind. Plenty of personality that shines through despite the somewhat suspect sound quality."

Record Collector in April 2024 included Lone Star in a listing of "Stars of Beards - 10 UK underground classics" as a sidebar from a "Freak Scene" cover feature on the 1960s/1970s UK underground scene.

== Band members ==
=== Electric Shagrat ===
- Steve Peregrin Took – lead vocals, rhythm guitar, maracas
- Larry Wallis – lead guitar, backing vocals
- Tim Taylor – bass
- Phil Lenoir – drums

=== Acoustic Shagrat ===
- Steve Peregrin Took – vocals, acoustic guitar
- Larry Wallis – acoustic bass
- Dave Bidwell – percussion (tambourine, handclaps)

== Discography ==
=== Album ===
- Lone Star (Captain Trip Records, 2001, recorded 1970-1971)
