= Edward Barker (cartoonist) =

English cartoonist (1950–1997)

John Edward Barker
- Born: 31 May 1950; Birmingham
- Died: 18 April 1997 (aged 46)
- Occupation: Cartoonist

John Edward Barker (31 May 1950 – 18 April 1997) was an English cartoonist, best known for his work in International Times and The Observer in the late 1960s and early 1970s, including the comic strip "The Largactilites" (later renamed "The Galactilites"). He was described as "the wittiest and most idiosyncratic cartoonist to emerge from the British underground press". His cartoons were usually signed simply "Edward".

== Life ==
Born in Birmingham, he studied at Moseley School of Art, and was a regular at the forerunner of MAC, The Midlands Arts Centre for Young People, before joining an avant-garde project, the Birmingham Arts Lab. He moved, with friends from Midlands Arts Centre to a house in Muswell Hill where they tried to succeed in the pop world, Barker playing tablas. In 1969, he was recruited by Graham Keen to join the staff of underground newspaper International Times (IT). There, he introduced a regular cartoon, "The Largactilites" – "a collection of cone-shaped creatures who did very little and said less". In 1970, he was offered the opportunity to draw the series for The Observer, but faced immediate criticism over its title – Largactil (also known as chlorpromazine or Thorazine) being a drug used clinically to treat mental illness. The strip's name was changed to "The Galactilites". However, after a few weeks Barker was released from his contract after submitting a four-frame strip which consisted solely of four horizon-lines, becoming the first cartoon to appear in Private Eye's "Pseuds Corner".

He continued to work for various underground and music journals, including IT and New Musical Express, also designing album covers and publishing comic books. These included Edward's Heave Comics, published during the government of Edward Heath; and Nasty Tales, co-published with Mick Farren in 1971, which was prosecuted but cleared of obscenity charges in 1973 in the first such trial of a comic book in British history. Barker and Farren also organised the 1970 Phun City free festival and co-published Watch Out Kids (1972), "a handbook of youth rebellion tracing the rise of youth culture from Elvis and James Dean through to the MC5, the White Panthers and The Angry Brigade".

Barker was art director for Seed, The Journal of Organic Living, from 1976 to 1977. He created the Whole Earth Foods brand logo in 1976. Barker illustrated and designed the original packaging for the Realeat 'Vegeburger' in 1981, the first vegetarian burger.

Barker later lived in Cornwall and Kent, before his death from heart failure at the age of 46. Farren wrote: "Edward may have drunk himself to death in 1997, but he was also one of the gentlest and most innocent beings who ever walked this Earth, which is possibly why the same Earth proved too much for him."
