= Paul Rudolph (musician) =

Canadian musician

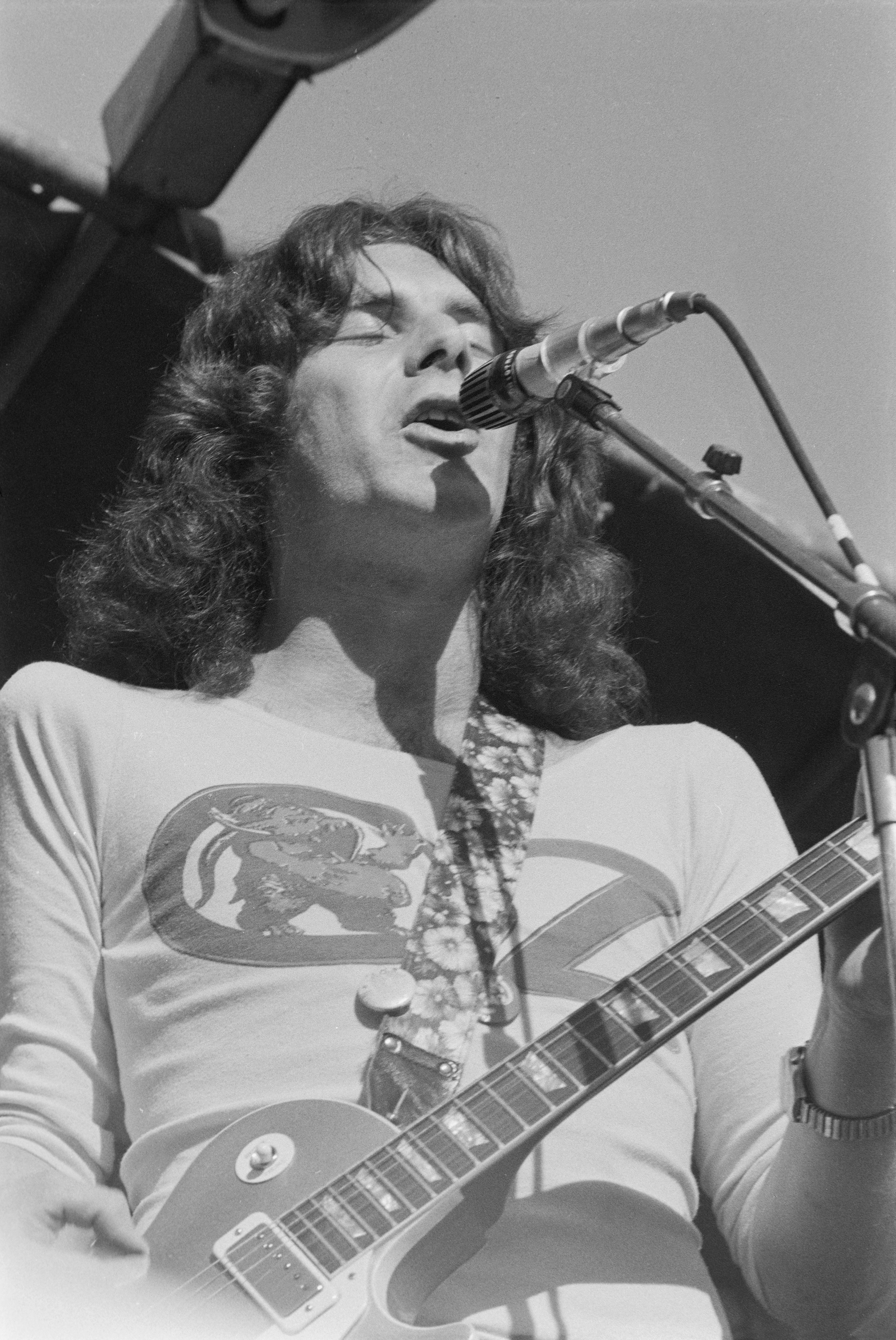
- Paul Rudolph playing with Pink Fairies at Ruisrock Festival, 1971

Background information
- Born: Paul Fraser Rudolph; 14 June 1947 (age 78); Vancouver, British Columbia, Canada
- Occupations: Musician; singer; cyclist
- Instruments: Guitar; bass; vocals

Paul Fraser Rudolph (born June 14, 1947 in Vancouver, British Columbia, Canada) is a Canadian guitarist, bassist, singer, and cyclist. He made his mark in the UK underground music scene, and then as a session musician, before returning to Canada to indulge his passion for cycling. He resided in Gibsons, British Columbia, where he owned and operated a bicycle business, Spin Cycle. He has since retired to Victoria, British Columbia.

== Musical career ==
As a child, Rudolph suffered from polio that affected his upper right arm and shoulder; at the age of 10 he took up guitar playing, which also served as physiotherapy for his condition. As a teenager he played bass in local bars for blues and boogie bands such as The Midnighters and The Pannix.

At the recommendation of his childhood friend Jamie Mandelkau, he relocated to London, England, joining the Mick Farren-led band The Deviants as a guitarist. After recording their third album and contributing to Twink's Think Pink album, the band and singer parted company during a disastrous tour of the West Coast of North America.

Returning to England, the band hooked up with Twink, forming The Pink Fairies, signing to Polydor and embarking upon a career centred on Ladbroke Grove, occasionally hooking up with Hawkwind to form a live ensemble named Pinkwind, and by themselves recording two albums, Never Never Land and What a Bunch of Sweeties. Rudolph left immediately after the release of the second album in order to pursue other ventures, including a stint in Uncle Dog with Carol Grimes. He was invited by Roxy Music producer John Porter in early 1973 to participate in demo sessions for Sparks, before that band had found British musicians (Adrian Fisher, Martin Gordon and Dinky Diamond) for their UK re-launch.

It was at the final Uncle Dog gig that he met former Roxy Music musician Brian Eno which would lead to him contributing to four of his albums in between 1973 and 1977, namely Here Come the Warm Jets, Another Green World, Music for Films and Before and After Science. At the same time he became the main musical interpreter for Hawkwind collaborator Robert Calvert (with whose work Eno too became involved), recording the concept albums Captain Lockheed and the Starfighters and Lucky Leif and the Longships.

Rudolph joined Hawkwind during 1975 after they sacked their bass player Lemmy, and Robert Calvert soon joined him. They produced one album Astounding Sounds, Amazing Music followed by a non-album single Back on the Streets before he and drummer Alan Powell were sacked for trying to broaden the scope of the band's music. One of his songs, "Hassan I Sabbah", a collaboration between him and Robert Calvert, was included on the album Quark, Strangeness and Charm. The extended CD album also includes tracks where he plays guitar and bass on early cuts of the album songs.

Powell and Rudolph formed the short-lived Kicks with Cal Batchelor and Steve York, before the pair of them worked on Mick Farren's Screwed Up EP. The EP led to the offer of an album, Vampires Stole My Lunch Money, but by then Rudolph had decided to return to his native Canada.

There have been archive releases and reunions for both Pink Fairies and Hawkwind which he has resisted, with the exception of a pair of albums, Pleasure Island and No Picture, recorded with Twink and released under the Pink Fairies name.

In September 2009, the What a Bunch of Sweeties Pink Fairies line-up re-united in the studio to record a new version of "Do It" for the various artists CD Portobello Shuffle.

== Cycling ==
During his time in England, Rudolph discovered and indulged in another passion: cycling. He gained a racing licence and was taught by a master wheel builder, skills that he used to embark on a new profession which he still follows today.

== Discography ==
- 1969 – The Deviants – #3
- 1970 – Twink – Think Pink
- 1971 – Pink Fairies – The Snake (single)
- 1971 – Pink Fairies – Never Never Land
- 1972 – Pink Fairies – What a Bunch of Sweeties
- 1972 – Various artists – Glastonbury Fayre
- 1973 – Brian Eno – Here Come the Warm Jets
- 1974 – Robert Calvert – Captain Lockheed and the Starfighters
- 1975 – Brian Eno – Another Green World
- 1975 – Robert Calvert – Lucky Leif and the Longships
- 1976 – Hawkwind – Astounding Sounds, Amazing Music
- 1976 – Hawkwind – Back on the Streets (single)
- 1977 – Mick Farren – Screwed Up (EP)
- 1977 – Brian Eno – Before and After Science
- 1978 – Brian Eno – Music For Films
- 1982 – Pink Fairies – Live at the Roundhouse 1975
- 1996 – Pink Fairies – Pleasure Island
- 1997 – Pink Fairies – No Picture
- 1998 – Pink Fairies – Mandies and Mescaline Round at Uncle Harry's (live 1971)
- 1999 – Pink Fairies – Live at the Weeley 1971 (live 1971)
- 1999 – Hawkwind – Atomhenge 76 (live 1976)
- 2008 – Pink Fairies – Finland Freakout 1971 (MLP)
- 2018 – Pink Fairies – Resident Reptiles
