= UK underground =

British counterculture

Issue Number 8 of the British underground newspaper International Times, February 1967

The British counter-culture or underground scene developed during the mid-1960s, and was linked to the hippie subculture of the United States. Its primary focus was around Ladbroke Grove and Notting Hill in London. It generated its own magazines and newspapers, bands, clubs and alternative lifestyle, associated with cannabis and LSD use and a strong socio-political revolutionary agenda to create an alternative society.

== Beat Generation influence ==
Many in the blossoming underground movement were influenced by 1950s Beat Generation writers such as William Burroughs and Allen Ginsberg, who paved the way for the hippies and the counterculture of the 1960s. During the 1960s, the Beat writers engaged in symbiotic evolution with freethinking academics including experimental psychologist Timothy Leary.

An example of the cross-over of Beat poetry and music can be seen when Burroughs appeared at the Phun City festival, organised in 24–26 July 1970 by Mick Farren with underground community bands including The Pretty Things, Kevin Ayers, Edgar Broughton Band, Pink Fairies, Shagrat, and, from the United States, the MC5.

== History ==
The UK's underground movement was focused on the Ladbroke Grove/Notting Hill area of London, which Mick Farren said "was an enclave of freaks, immigrants and bohemians long before the hippies got there". It had been depicted in Colin MacInnes' novel Absolute Beginners, about street culture at the time of the Notting Hill riots of the 1950s.

The underground paper International Times (IT) began to appear in 1966 and Steve Abrams, founder of Soma, summarised the underground as a "literary and artistic avant-garde with a large contingent from Oxford and Cambridge. John Hopkins (Hoppy), a member of the editorial board of International Times for example, was trained as a physicist at Cambridge."

Police harassment of members of the underground (often referred to as "freaks", initially by others as an insult, and later by themselves as an act of defiance) became commonplace, particularly against the underground press. According to Farren, "Police harassment, if anything, made the underground press stronger. It focused attention, stiffened resolve, and tended to confirm that what we were doing was considered dangerous to the establishment."

Within Portobello Road stood the Mountain Grill, a greasy spoon cafe, which in the late 1960s and early 1970s was frequented by several UK underground artists, including Hawkwind and the Pink Fairies. In 1974, Hawkwind released an album titled Hall Of The Mountain Grill and Steve Peregrin Took wrote Ballad of the Mountain Grill (aka Flophouse Blues).

== Commentators ==
Mick Farren said,

My own feeling is that, not just sex, but anger and violence, are part and parcel of rock n' roll. The rock concert can work as an alternative for violence, an outlet for violence. But at that time there were a lot of things that made us really angry. We were outraged! In the U.S. the youth were sent to Vietnam and there was nothing we could do to change the way the government did it. Smoking cannabis and doing things to get thrown in jail were our own way of expressing our anger, and we wanted change - I believed that picking up a guitar, not a gun, would bring about change. It's like Germaine Greer said about the underground - it's not just some sort of scruffy club you can join, you're in or you're out ... it's like being a criminal.

== Culture ==
The underground movement was heavily symbolised by the use of drugs. The types of drugs used were varied and in many cases the names and effects were unknown as the Deviants/Pink Fairies member Russell Hunter, working at International Times (part of the underground press at the time), recalled. "People used to send in all kinds of strange drugs and things, pills and powders, stuff to smoke and that. They'd always give them to me to try to find out what they were! [Laughs]".

Part of the sense of humour of the underground, no doubt partly induced by the effects of both drugs and radical thinking, was an enjoyment at "freakin' out the norms". Mick Farren recalls actions sure to elicit the required response. "The band's baroque House of Usher apartment on London's Shaftesbury Avenue had witnessed pre-Raphaelite hippy scenes, like Sandy the bass player (of the Deviants and Pink Fairies), Tony the now and again keyboard player, and a young David Bowie, fresh from Beckenham Arts Lab, sunbathing on the roof, taking photos of each other and posing coyly as sodomites".

=== Music ===
The underground functioned as a politically radical alternative to the mod culture and, for a period, had an overlap in musical styles. Freakbeat was music "beyond the formula required for commercial success" that was "exciting, and often outrageous". During the 1960s, this style would generally have been referred to by the music industry and music press as simply underground or countercultural. In a 1970 article of the underground magazine Oz entitled Brown Shoes Don’t Make It (after the 1966 Frank Zappa song), music journalist Charles Shaar Murray wrote:

"It was, at least for me and most of the people I know, the music that first aroused interest in things Underground, and the music is still the most mature and developed manifestation of the culture of the Underground."

Freakbeat music was key to the underground scene and was prominent roughly between 1964 and 1967, before being displaced by psychedelic rock. There is debate on whether British psychedelia presented a sanitised version of freakbeat.

Later bands who often performed at benefit gigs in the anti-commercial ethos of the UK underground included Pink Floyd with Syd Barrett, Soft Machine with Kevin Ayers, Tomorrow, The Pretty Things, the Deviants with Mick Farren, Tyrannosaurus Rex, Edgar Broughton Band, Hawkwind, Pink Fairies, and Shagrat. Key figures included Marc Bolan, Steve Peregrin Took and Twink. These artists would perform at London venues such as the UFO Club and the Roundhouse.

=== Aesthetics ===
The image of the underground as manifested in magazines such as Oz and newspapers like International Times was dominated by graphic artists such as Martin Sharp and Hapshash and the Coloured Coat, who fused Alfons Mucha's Art Nouveau arabesques with the higher colour key of psychedelia.

== The Overground ==
There was a smaller, less widely spread manifestation from the UK underground termed the "Overground", which referred to an explicitly spiritual, cosmic, quasi-religious intent, though this was an element that had always been present. At least two magazines—Gandalf's Garden (6 issues, 1968–72) and Vishtaroon—adopted this "overground" style. Gandalf's Garden was also a shop/restaurant/meeting place at World's End, Chelsea. The magazines were printed on pastel paper using multi-coloured inks and contained articles about meditation, vegetarianism, mandalas, ethics, poetry, pacifism and other subjects at a distance from the more wild and militant aspects of the underground. The first issue of Gandalf's Garden urged that we should "seek to stimulate our own inner gardens if we are to save our Earth and ourselves from engulfment." It was edited by Muz Murray, now yogi Ramana Baba.

These attitudes were embodied musically in The Incredible String Band, who in 2003 were described as "holy" by the then Archbishop of Canterbury, Rowan Williams, in a foreword for the book Be Glad: An Incredible String Band Compendium. He had previously chosen the band's track "The Hedgehog's Song" as his only piece of popular music on the radio programme Desert Island Discs). The critic Ian MacDonald said: "Much that appeared to be profane in Sixties youth culture was quite the opposite".

== See also ==
- Counterculture of the 1960s
- Hungry generation
- Jim Haynes
- White Bicycles
- Bomb Culture
- Psychedelic freakout
