= Reginald of Canterbury =

12th-century French monk and writer

Reginald of Canterbury (died after 1109) was a medieval French writer and Benedictine monk who lived and wrote in England in the very early part of the 12th century. He was the author of a number of Latin poems, including an epic entitled Malchus, which still survives.

Born in France around 1050, he arrived in England sometime before 1100. He became a monk at St Augustine's Abbey in Canterbury, where most of his poetic works were composed. He is last mentioned in 1109, when he was the recipient of a poem from Thomas the Archbishop of York. Reginald's major work was an epic poem in six books on the life of Malchus, a late antique Syrian saint whose first biographer was Jerome. Reginald's other works included a poem about his native town, a group of poems extolling Canterbury and its saints, and one or two on Anselm of St Saba.

== Life ==
Reginald, a native of France, was born roughly about 1050 in a place usually called Fagia, which may be the modern Faye-la-Vineuse in Poitou. The local lord for Fagia was named Aimericus, and it is possible that he served as an early patron for Reginald. At some point he formed a connection with Noyers Abbey, near Tours, but its nature is unclear. By 1100, he was a monk at St Augustine's Abbey in Canterbury, England, and may have been there for quite a number of years before 1100. It is unclear why he travelled to England and most of his poetical works were composed in England while he was at St Augustine's.

Reginald was still alive in 1109, when he was the recipient of a poem from Thomas the Archbishop of York, who was elevated to York in 1109. This poem of Thomas' was in thanks for a copy of the Vita that Thomas had received, and the thanks-poem has a notation that it was from Thomas as archbishop.

== Work ==
Reginald's major work was an epic poem in six books on the life of Malchus, a late antique Syrian saint whose first biographer was Jerome. Reginald's work, entitled Malchus, or Vita Sancti Malchi, exists in two versions, the first of which consists of 1706 lines and survives at Oxford University as Merton College manuscript (MS) 241. The second is expanded from the first and three times its length.

Reginald's other works included a poem about his native town, a group of poems extolling Canterbury and its saints, and one or two on Anselm of St Saba. The largest surviving version of his poems is in Bodleian Library manuscript Laud misc 40, which was probably a presentation copy to one of Reginald's correspondents, Baldwin, a monk of the cathedral chapter of Rochester Cathedral. In his prose works, Reginald experimented with poetic metres, employing hexameters, pentameters and sapphics, but his main poems were in hexameters. These works have been edited and published by two different modern editors. Five poems were edited by Thomas Wright in 1872 in the Anglo-Latin Satirical Poets published in the Rolls Series as volume 59. The other 31 surviving poems were edited by Felix Liebermann in an 1888 article in Liebermann's journal Neues Archiv. Reginald's work was part of the flowering of hagiography after the Norman Conquest that included works by Goscelin, Eadmer, and Osbern of Canterbury. He may also have been the author of a Versarium de libris ethnicorum that was recorded as being in the library at Rievaulx Abbey around 1200, but as the work does not survive it is not clear whether Reginald was its author.
