= November 23 (Eastern Orthodox liturgics) =

Day in the Eastern Orthodox liturgical calendar

Eastern Orthodox liturgical calendar
November 22	November 23	November 24
November 23 O.S. ≍ December 6 N.S. November 23 N.S ≍ November 10 O.S.

An Eastern Orthodox cross

November 23 in Eastern Orthodox liturgical calendars is a feast day and a day of commemoration of saints and martyrs. Although some Orthodox churches use the Revised Julian Calendar and others use the traditional Julian calendar, the fixed commemorations for their respective November 23 are broadly the same, no matter which calendar is used. (Note: Despite the dates being the same, the days to which they refer typically differ by 13 days. The notation Old Style or O.S. is sometimes used to indicate a date in the traditional Julian Calendar (the "Old Calendar"). The notation New Style or N.S. indicates a date in the Revised Julian calendar (the "New Calendar").)

== Feasts ==
- Afterfeast of the Entry of the Most Holy Theotokos into the Temple.

== Saints ==
- Martyr Myrope of Chios, under Decius (251) (see also: December 2)
- Saint Sisinius the Confessor, Bishop of Cyzicus (c. 325) (Note: "At Cyzicum, in Hellespont, St. Sisinius, martyr, who, after many torments, was put to the sword, in the same persecution.")
- Venerable Ischyrion, Bishop in Egypt and hermit of Scete.
- Venerable Elenos (Helenus), Bishop of Tarsus.
- Martyr Theodore of Antioch (after 363)
- Saint Amphilochius, Bishop of Iconium (394) (Note: "At Iconium, in Lycaonia, the holy bishop Amphilochius, who was the companion of St. Basil and St. Gregory Nazianzen in the desert, and their colleague in the episcopate. After many combats for the Catholic faith, he rested in peace, with the reputation of a holy and learned prelate.")
- Saint Gregory, Bishop of Agrigentum, Sicily (690) (Note: Born in Sicily, after a long time spent in Constantinople, he became Bishop of Girgenti, his native town. His commentary on Ecclesiastes still exists.)

== Pre-Schism Western saints ==
- Saint Clement I, one of the Seventy Apostles, he was the third Pope of Rome (c. 101) (Note: One of the Seventy Apostles, he was the third Pope of Rome. Consecrated by the Apostle Peter, he is mentioned in Philippians 4,3 and wrote a letter to the Church of Corinth which still exists. He is venerated as a martyr and he is remembered in Rome by the church of San Clemente, which may have been built on the site of his home.) (see also: Jan 4, Apr 22, Sept 10 and Nov 25 - East) (Note: "THE birthday of pope St. Clement, who held the sovereign Pontificate the third after the blessed apostle Peter. In the persecution of Trajan, he was banished to Chersonesus, where, being precipitated into the sea with an anchor tied to his neck, he was crowned with martyrdom. His body was taken to Rome during the pontificate of Nicholas I, and placed with due honors in the church which had been previously built under his invocation.")
- Saint Felicity, a widow martyred with her sons either in Rome or else in North Africa under Decius, buried in Rome (c. 165) (Note: "At Rome, St. Felicitas, mother of seven sons, martyrs. After them she was beheaded for Christ, by order of the emperor Marcus Antoninus.") (see also: January 25 - East)
- Virgin-martyr Lucretia, in Mérida in the west of Spain (306) (Note: "At Merida, in Spain, St. Lucretia, virgin and martyr, who consummated her martyrdom in the persecution of Diocletian, under the governor Dacian.")
- Saint Paternian, Bishop of Fano in Italy (c. 343)
- Saint Clement, first Bishop of Metz in the east of France.
- Saint Paulinus of Wales (Polin, Pewlin, Paulhen), an Abbot in Wales and disciple of St Illtyd, founder of the monastery of Whitland (c. 505)
- Saint Columbanus (Columban), Irish missionary and founder of Luxeuil Abbey and Bobbio Abbey (615) (Note: Born in Leinster, he became a monk and ascetic at Bangor. In 580 he left Ireland with a group of monks and worked first in England, then in Brittany and finally in France where he founded a very strict monastery at Luxeuil. Here he was abbot for twenty-five years. His outspoken protest against the disorders of the Frankish court led to his exile. He ended his days in the north of Italy at Bobbio where he had also founded a monastery.) (see also: November 21)
- Saint Wilfetrudis, second Abbess of Nivelles in Belgium, founded by her aunt St Gertrude (c. 670)
- Venerable Trudo (Trudon, Tron, Trond, Truyen, Trudjen), Abbot, of Zirkingen (c. 695) (Note: "In the village of Hasbein, St. Tron, priest and confessor." A monk with St Remaclus, he was ordained by St Clodulf of Metz and eventually founded a monastery (c 660), which was called St Trond after him. It is situated between Louvain and Tongres in Belgium.)
- Saint Rachildis, an anchoress who lived near the monastery of St Gall in Switzerland (c. 946)
- Saint Adalbert, a monk at Cassoria in the Abruzzi in Italy, founder of the monastery of St Nicholas on Mt Caramanico near Chieti (c. 1045)
- Saint Guy of Casauria, a monk at Farfa who became Abbot of Casauria Abbey near Chieti in Italy (1045)

== Post-Schism Orthodox saints ==
- Saint Amphilochius of the Kiev Caves, Bishop of Vladimir, Volhynia (1122) (see also: August 28)
- Burial of Saint Alexander Nevsky (in schema Alexis), Grand Prince of Novgorod (1263) (see also: November 14 - repose; August 30 - translation of relics)
- Saint Dionysius I, Patriarch of Constantinople, "the Wise" (1492)
- Saint Metrophanes (Mitrophan, Mitrofan) (in schema Macarius), Bishop of Voronezh (1703)
- Saint Anthony of Iezeru-Vilcea, Romania (1714)

=== New martyrs and confessors ===
- New Hieromartyr Seraphim Thievart, Hieromonk of Moscow (1931) (Note: See: (in Russian) Серафим (Тьевар). Википедии. (Russian Wikipedia).)
- Saint John Vasiliev, Confessor (1932)
- New Hieromartyr Boris Voskoboinikov, Bishop of Ivanovo (1937)
- New Hieromartyr Eleazar Spyridonov of Eupatoria, Priest, first rector of the Greek Church of St. Elijah (Yevpatoria) in Crimea (1937)
- Martyr Alexander Uksusov of Yaroslavl-Rostov (1937)
- New Hieomartyr Archimandrite Gregory (Grigol) Peradze of Georgia, who suffered in Auschwitz, Poland (1942) (see also: December 6 - N.S.)

== Icon gallery ==
Saint Sisinius the Confessor, Bishop of Cyzicus.
(Menologion of Basil II, 10th century).

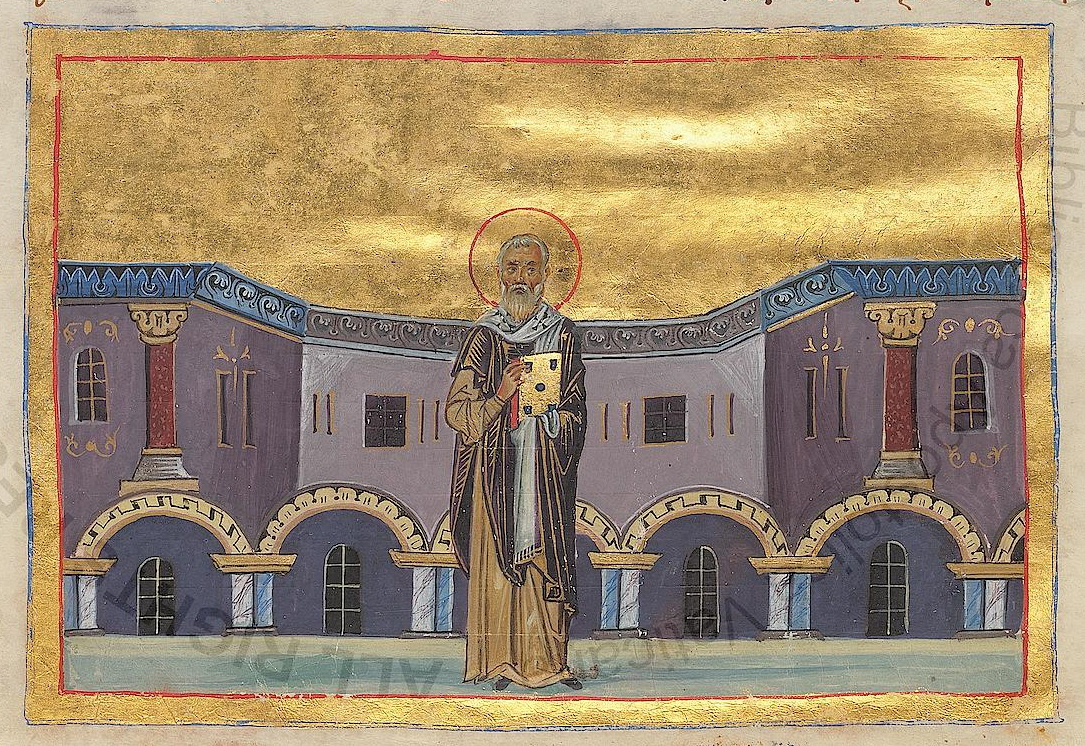
St Amphilochius of Iconium.
(Menologion of Basil II, 10th century).

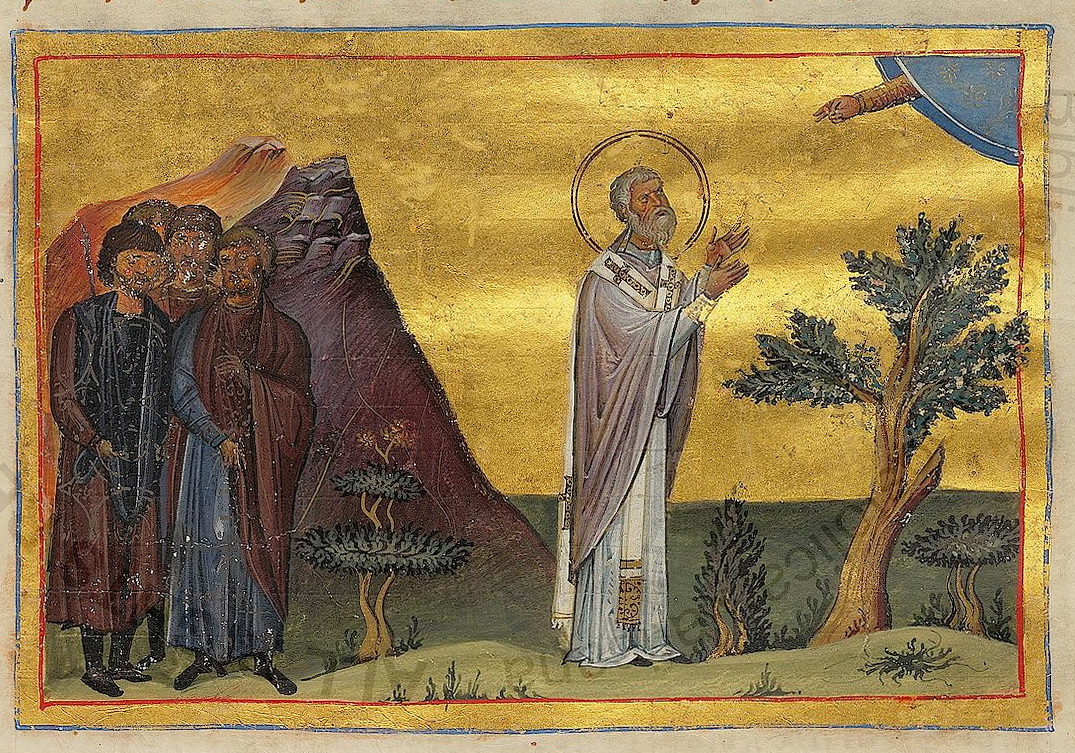
St. Gregory, Bishop of Agrigentum.
(Menologion of Basil II, 10th century).

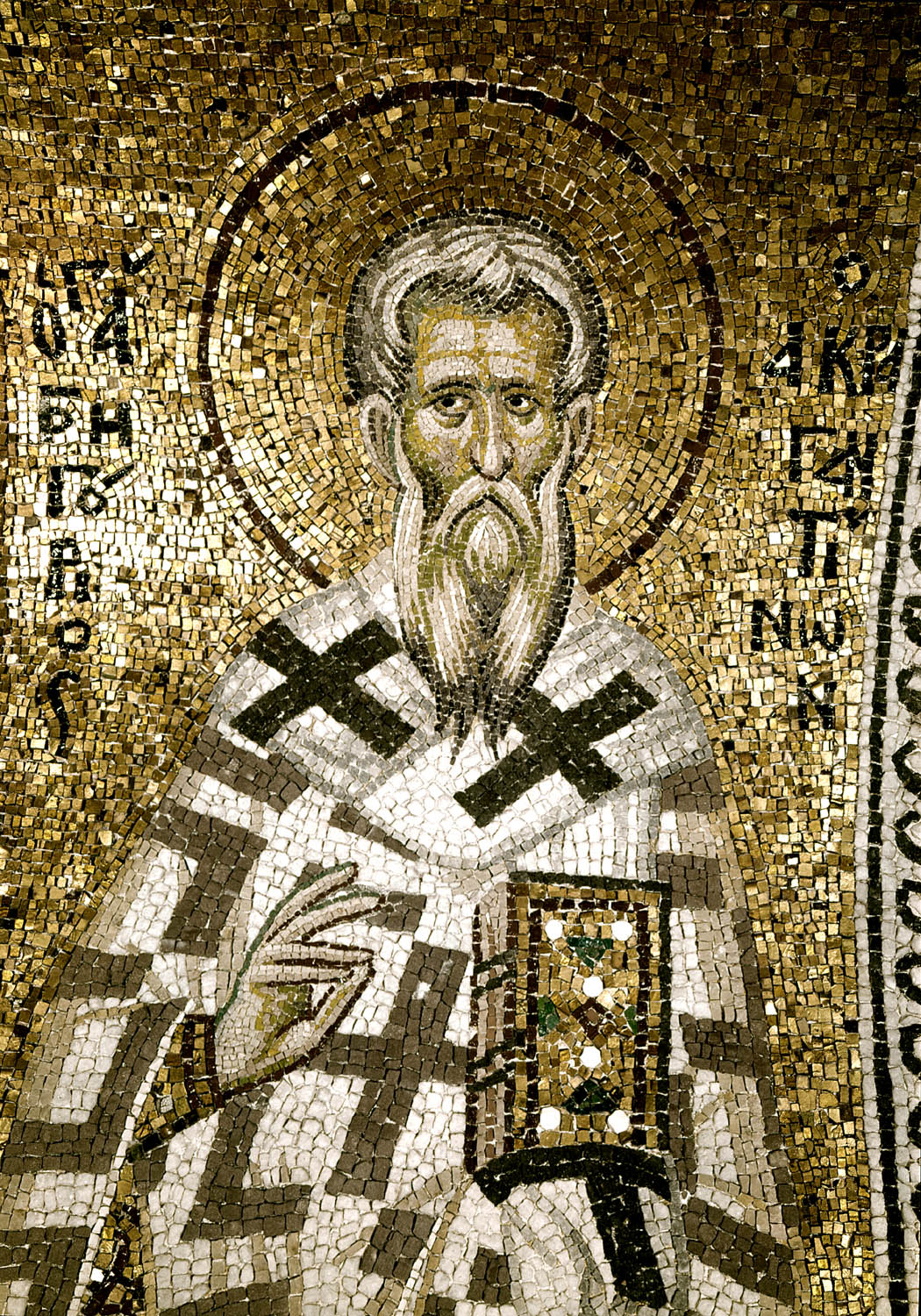
St. Gregory, Bishop of Agrigentum.

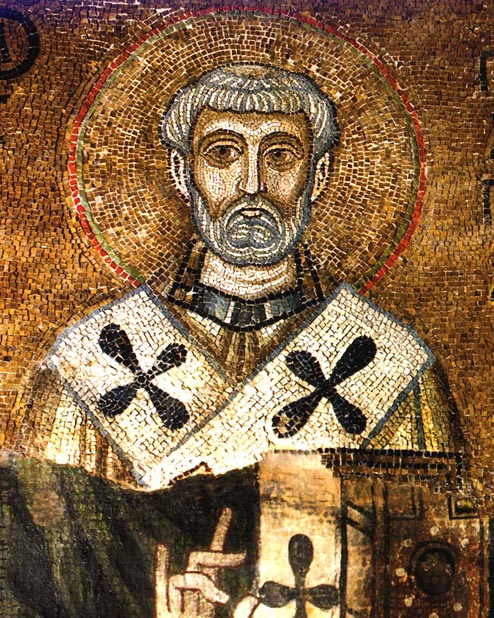
St. Clement I, one of the Seventy Apostles, the third Pope of Rome.

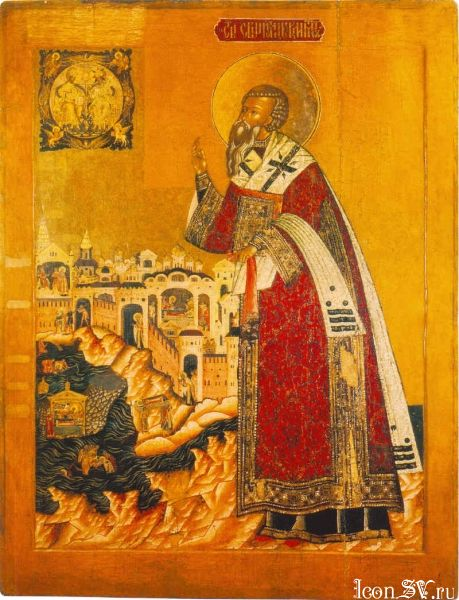
St. Clement I, one of the Seventy Apostles, the third Pope of Rome.

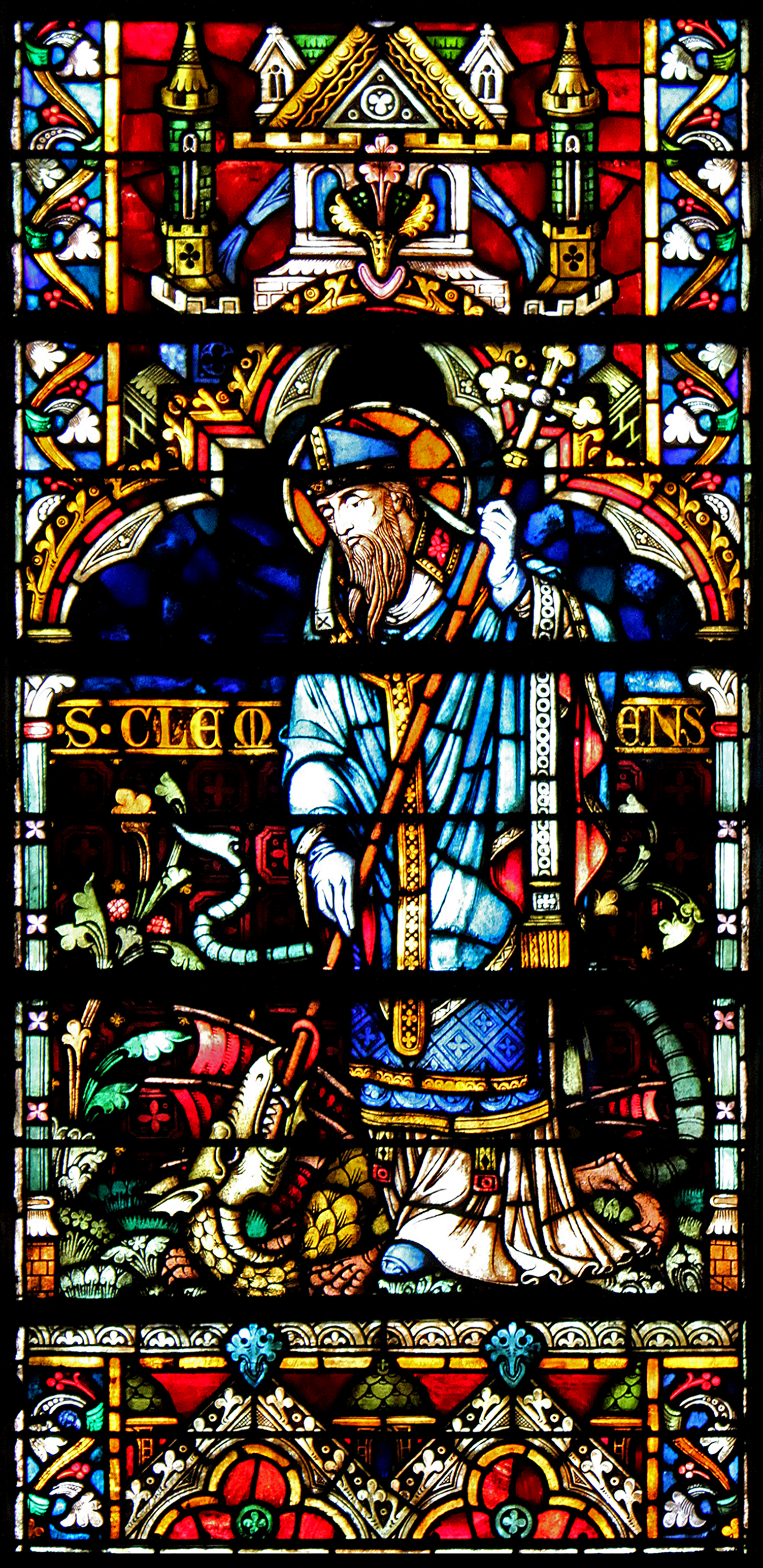
St Clément of Metz.

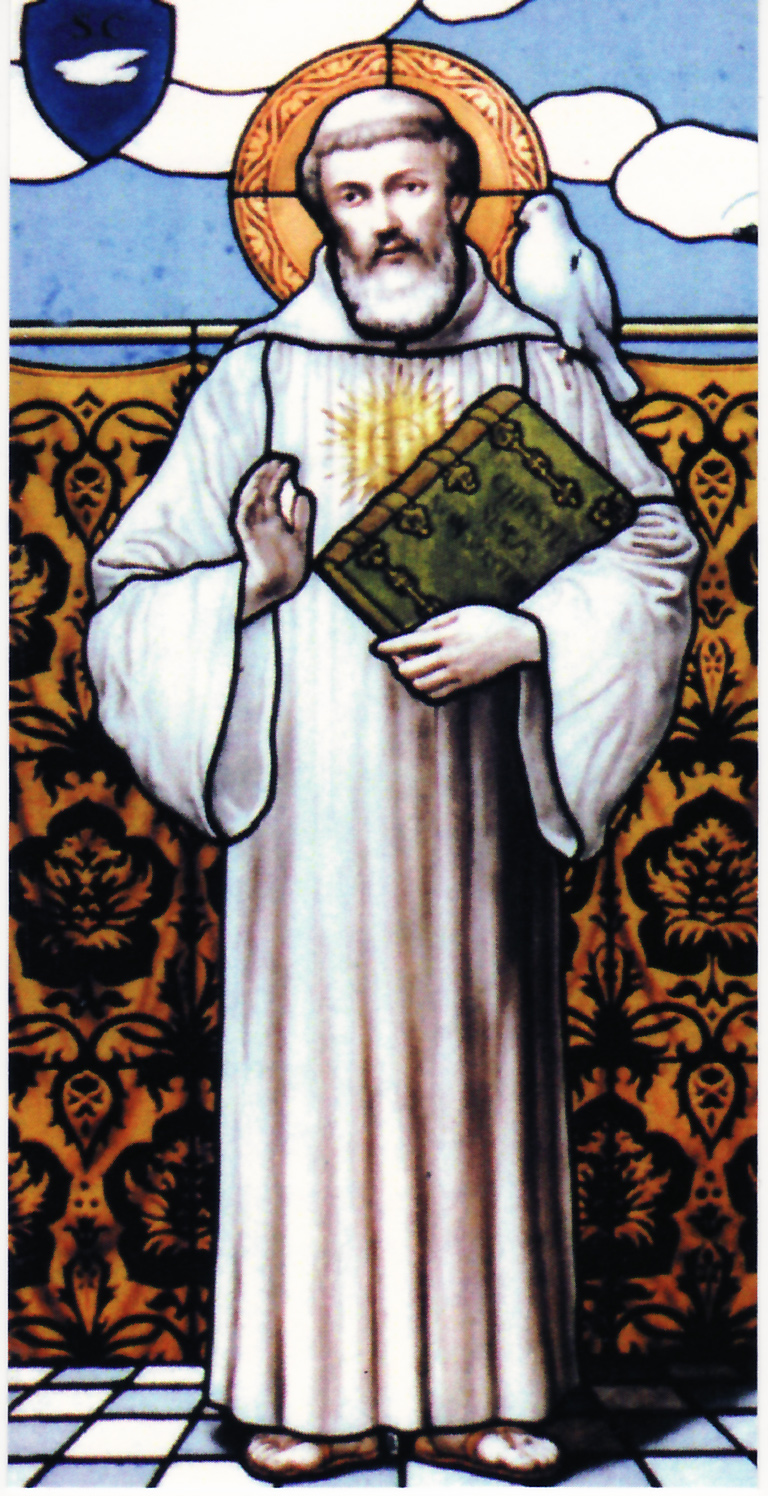
St. Columbanus of Bobbio, Abbot and founder of Luxeuil Abbey in Gaul, and Bobbio Abbey in Italy.

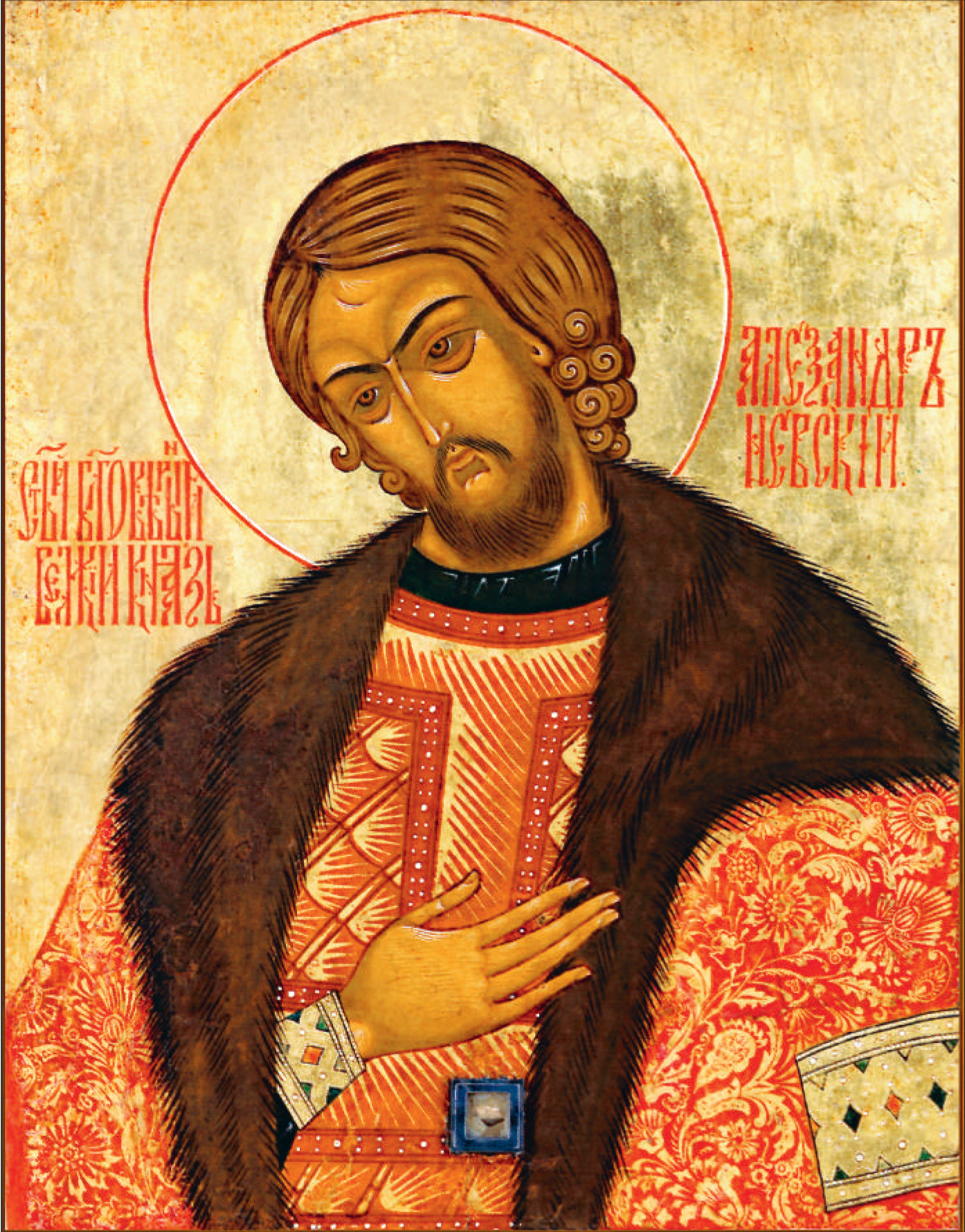
St. Alexander Nevsky, Grand Prince of Novgorod.

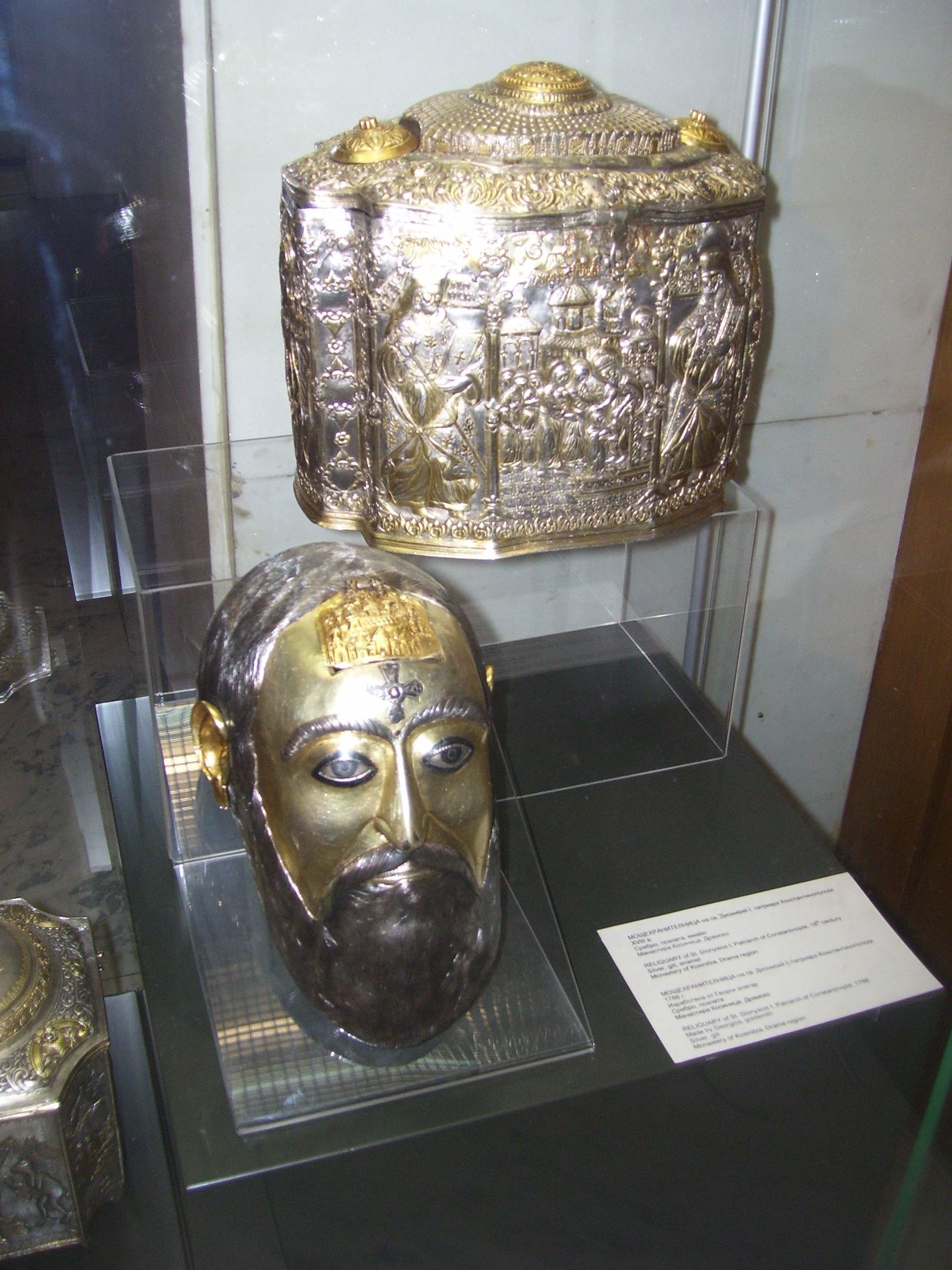
Two 1788 reliquaries of St Dionysius I
(Panagia Ikosifinissa Monastery, Greece)

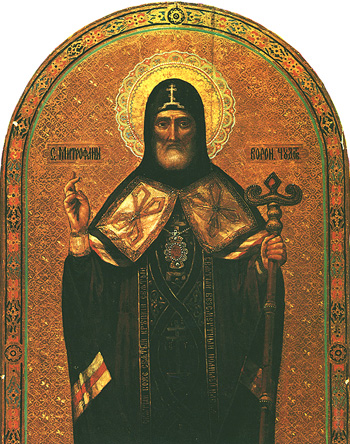
Saint Metrophanes of Voronezh.

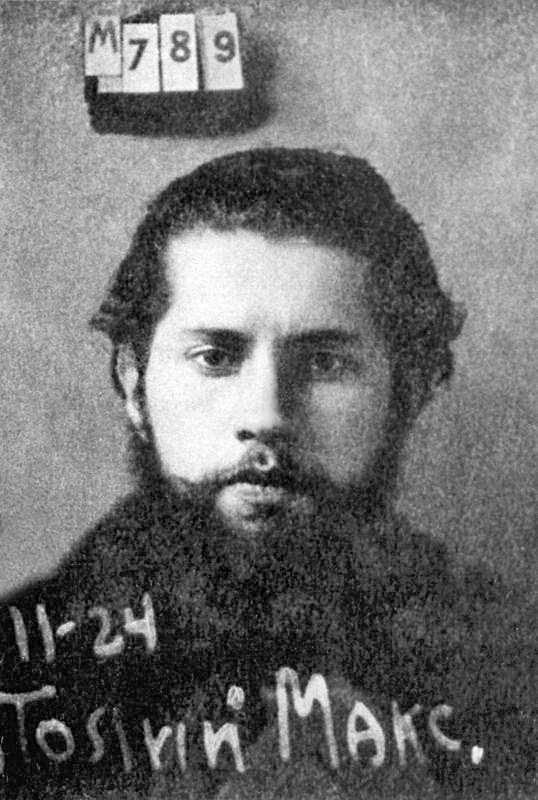
New Hieromartyr Seraphim (Thievart), Hieromonk, of Moscow.

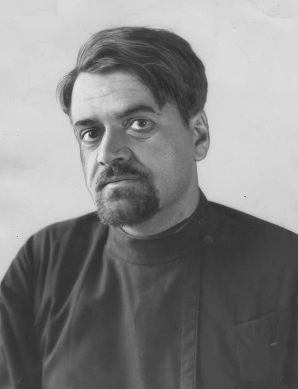
New Martyr Archimandrite Gregory (Peradze) of Georgia.

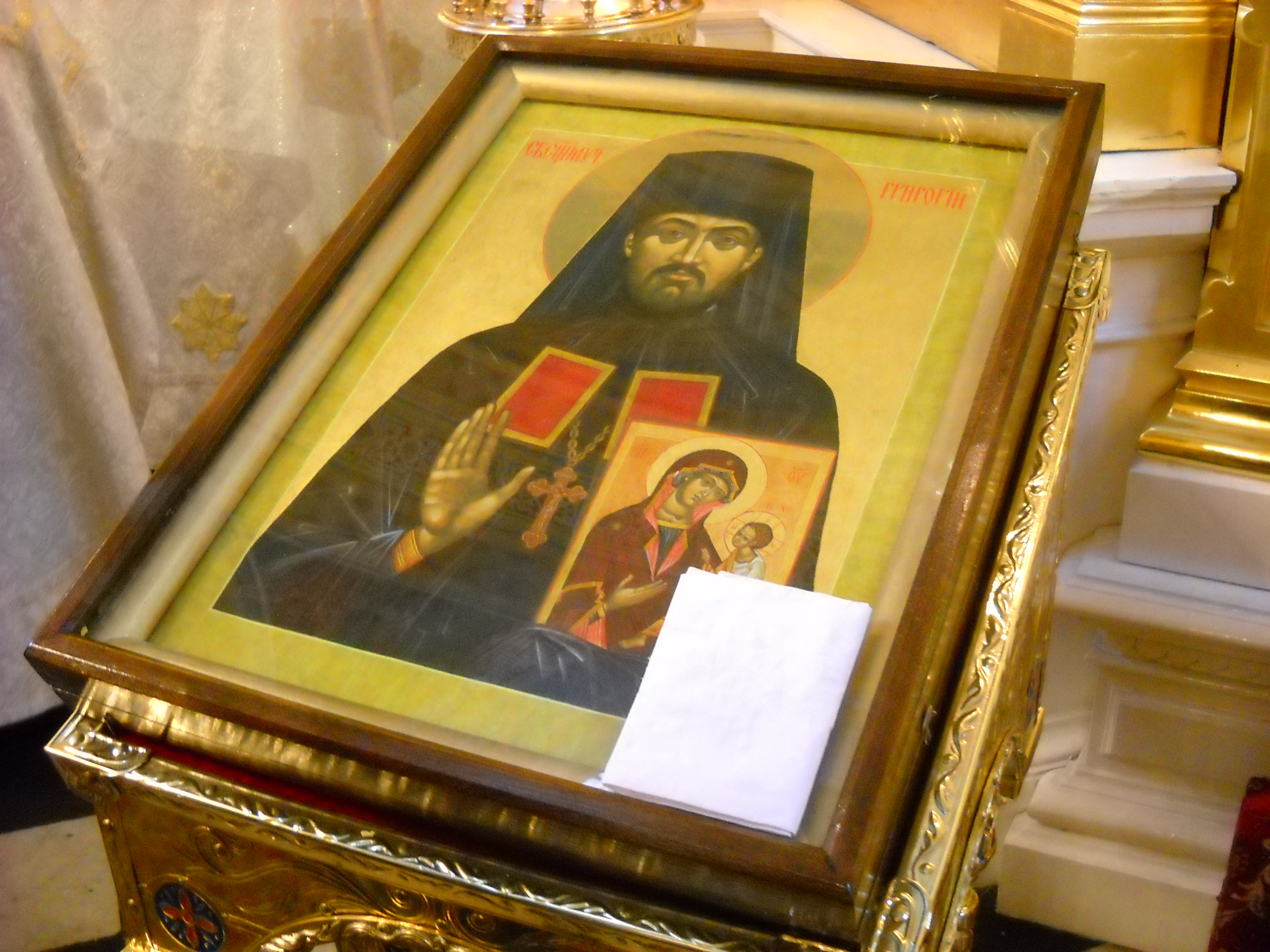
Icon of New Martyr Archimandrite Gregory (Peradze) of Georgia, in the Cathedral of St. Mary Magdalene in Warsaw.

== Sources ==
- November 23 / December 6. Orthodox Calendar (PRAVOSLAVIE.RU).
- December 6 / November 23. Holy Trinity Russian Orthodox Church (A parish of the Patriarchate of Moscow).
- November 23. OCA - The Lives of the Saints.
- The Autonomous Orthodox Metropolia of Western Europe and the Americas (ROCOR). St. Hilarion Calendar of Saints for the year of our Lord 2004. St. Hilarion Press (Austin, TX). p. 88.
- The Twenty-Third Day of the Month of November. Orthodoxy in China.
- November 23. Latin Saints of the Orthodox Patriarchate of Rome.
- The Roman Martyrology. Transl. by the Archbishop of Baltimore. Last Edition, According to the Copy Printed at Rome in 1914. Revised Edition, with the Imprimatur of His Eminence Cardinal Gibbons. Baltimore: John Murphy Company, 1916. pp. 361–362.
- Rev. Richard Stanton. A Menology of England and Wales, or, Brief Memorials of the Ancient British and English Saints Arranged According to the Calendar, Together with the Martyrs of the 16th and 17th Centuries. London: Burns & Oates, 1892. pp. 562–563.

Greek Sources

- Great Synaxaristes: (in Greek) 23 ΝΟΕΜΒΡΙΟΥ. ΜΕΓΑΣ ΣΥΝΑΞΑΡΙΣΤΗΣ.
- (in Greek) Συναξαριστής. 23 Νοεμβρίου. ECCLESIA.GR. (H ΕΚΚΛΗΣΙΑ ΤΗΣ ΕΛΛΑΔΟΣ).
- (in Greek) November 23. Ορθόδοξος Συναξαριστής.

Russian Sources

- (in Russian) 6 декабря (23 ноября). Православная Энциклопедия под редакцией Патриарха Московского и всея Руси Кирилла (электронная версия). (Orthodox Encyclopedia - Pravenc.ru).
- (in Russian) 23 ноября по старому стилю / 6 декабря по новому стилю. Русская Православная Церковь - Православный церковный календарь на 2018 год.
