= November 24 (Eastern Orthodox liturgics) =

Day in the Eastern Orthodox liturgical calendar

Eastern Orthodox liturgical calendar
November 23	November 24	November 25
November 24 O.S. ≍ December 7 N.S. November 24 N.S ≍ November 11 O.S.

An Eastern Orthodox cross

November 24 in Eastern Orthodox liturgical calendars is a feast day and a day of commemoration of saints and martyrs. Although some Orthodox churches use the Revised Julian Calendar and others use the traditional Julian calendar, the fixed commemorations for their respective November 24 are broadly the same, no matter which calendar is used. (Note: Despite the dates being the same, the days to which they refer typically differ by 13 days. The notation Old Style or O.S. is sometimes used to indicate a date in the traditional Julian Calendar (the "Old Calendar"). The notation New Style or N.S. indicates a date in the Revised Julian calendar (the "New Calendar").)

== Feasts ==
- Afterfeast of the Entry of the Most Holy Theotokos into the Temple.

== Saints ==
- Hieromartyr Clement I, Pope of Rome (101) (Note: The translation of his relics from Crimea to Constantinople, guided by Saints Cyril and Methodius around the mid-9th century, is celebrated on November 24 in many Byzantine traditions. Historical accounts describe the relics miraculously appearing on the sea surface and being solemnly carried to the Church of the Holy Apostles at Constantinople, with a portion later brought to Rome, and some to Kiev.) (see also: November 23 - Western Orthodox use; and: November 25 - Russian use)
- Great-martyr Mercurius of Caesarea in Cappadocia (259) (see also: November 25 - Greek)
- Saint Hermogenes, Bishop of Agrigentum (c. 260) or (c. 824)
- Martyrs Procopius and Christopher, by the sword (274)
- Great-martyr Catherine of Alexandria (305) (Russia only. See also: November 25 - rest of Orthodox Church)
- Martyrs Augusta (Faustina) the Empress, Porphyrius Stratelates, and 200 soldiers at Alexandria with Great-martyr Catherine (305) (Russia only - see also: November 25 - rest of Orthodox Church)
- Martyrs Philoumenos and Christopher, by the sword.
- Martyr Eugene (Eugenios), buried alive inside a wall.
- Martyr Chrysogenes (Chrysogonos), in Aquileia in Italy, under Diocletian (4th century) (Note: "The same day, the birthday of St. Chrysogonus, martyr. After a long imprisonment in chains for the constant confession of Christ, he was by order of Diocletian taken to Aquileia, where he terminated his martyrdom by being beheaded and thrown into the sea.")
- Hieromartyr Peter I, Archbishop of Alexandria (311)
- Martyr Alexander at Corinth (360) (Note: "At Corinth, St. Alexander, martyr, who fought unto death for the faith of Christ, under Julian the Apostate and the governor Sallust.")
- Martyr Theodore, at Antioch, by beheading (361)
- Venerable Carion (Karion) the Egyptian of Scetis (4th century) (see also: December 5)
- Venerable Malchus of Chalcis in Syria (5th century) (see also: March 26)
- Venerable Mark of Triglia.
- Venerable Gregory, founder of the monastery of the Golden Rock (Chryse Petra) in Pontus.

== Pre-Schism Western saints ==
- Saint Felicissimus, a martyr who suffered in Perugia in Italy, probably under Diocletian (c. 303)
- Saint Firmina, a virgin-martyr in Amelia (Ameria) in Umbria under Diocletian (c. 303) (Note: "At Amelia, in Umbria, during the persecution of Diocletian, ST. Firmina, virgin and martyr, who, after being subjected to various torments, to hanging, and to burning with flaming torches, yielded up her spirit.")
- Saint Crescentian, a martyr in Rome with Sts Cyriacus, Largus and Smaragdus, under Maxentius (309) (Note: "At Rome, St. Crescentian, martyr, whose name is mentioned in the Acts of the blessed pope Marcellus.")
- Saint Protasius, Bishop of Milan (352) (Note: He defended St Athanasius against Arianism, notably at the Council of Sardica in 343.) (Note: "At Milan, St. Protasius, bishop, who defended the cause of Athanasius before the emperor Constans, in the council of Sardica. Having sustained many labors for the church entrusted to him and for religion, he departed this life to go to the Lord.")
- Saint Romanus of Le Mans (Romanus of Bordeaux), a Gallo-Roman priest who converted the pagans living at the mouth of the Gironde (385) (Note: "In the castle of Blaye, St. Romanus, a priest, whose holiness is proclaimed by glorious miracles.")
- Saint Minver (Menefrida), Virgin of Cornwall (5th century).
- Saint Kenan (Cianan), first bishop in Ireland to build his Cathedral, at Damleag or Duleek in Meath, of stone (c. 500)
- Venerable Portianus of Arthone, Gaul, a slave who became a monk and then Abbot of Miranda in Auvergne in France (527 or 533) (Note: "In Auvergne, St. Portian, an abbot, who was renowned for miracles in the time of king Theodoric.")
- Saint Colmán of Cloyne, first Bishop of Cloyne (c. 600) (Note: Born in Cork in Ireland, he was a royal bard at the court of Cashel. He was baptised by St Brendan, became a monk, was ordained priest and preached in Limerick and Cork. Finally he founded the church of Cloyne and became its first bishop.)
- Saint Leopardinus, monk and Abbot of St Symphorian of Vivarais in Berry in France, murdered and venerated as a martyr (7th century)
- Saint Bieuzy, born in Britain, he followed St Gildas to Brittany and was martyred there (7th century) (Note: "ST. BlEUZY was a native of Great Britain, who retired to Brittany to follow a solitary life and became a disciple of St. Gildas, succeeding him in his hermitage at Blavet. We have no authentic Acts of his life; but he is said to have been chosen parish priest of the district, and to have been gifted with miraculous powers. It is said that he suffered martyrdom at the hand of a wicked and violent man, for refusing to be unfaithful in the exercise of his pastoral office. His head is preserved and venerated in the Church of Pluvigne, in the diocese of Vannes.")
- Saint Eanflæd (Eanfleda), daughter of the holy King Edwin of Northumbria and St Æthelburh of Kent, Abbess at Whitby Abbey jointly with her daughter Ælfflæd (c. 700)
- Saint Marinus, a monk at Maurienne in Savoy, and afterwards a hermit near the monastery of Chandor where he was martyred by the Saracens (731)
- Saints Flora and Maria, two virgin-martyrs in Cordoba in Spain who gave themselves up to the Moors and were beheaded by order of Abderrahman II (851) (Note: "At Cordova, the saintly virgins and martyrs Flora and Mary, who were for a long time confined in prison and slain with the sword, in the persecution of the Arabs.")

== Post-Schism Orthodox saints ==
- Venerable Mastridia of Alexandria (1060)
- Martyr Philothea of Romania (1060) (see also: December 7)
- Hieromartyr Mercurius of Smolensk (1238) (Note: See: (in Russian) Меркурий Смоленский. Википедии. (Russian Wikipedia).)
- Venerable Luke, steward of the Kiev Caves (13th century) (see also: November 6)
- Saint Nikodemos (Nicodemus) the Younger of Philokalos Monastery in Thessaloniki (c. 1305)
- Venerable Mercurius the Faster of the Kievan Caves, far caves (14th century)
- Venerable Simon, Abbot of Soiga Monastery, Vologda (1562) (Note: See: (in Russian) Симон Сойгинский. Википедии. (Russian Wikipedia).)

=== New martyrs and confessors ===
- New Hieromartyr Eugraphus Evarestov, Archpriest (1919) (Note: See: (in Russian) Еварестов, Евграф Васильевич. Википедии. (Russian Wikipedia).)
- New Hieromartyrs Eugene Yakovlev and Michael Bogoroditsky, Priests (1937)
- New Hieromartyrs Alexander Levitsky, Alexis Tyutyunov, John Nikolsky, Cornelius Udilovich, and Metrophanes Kornitsky, Priests (1937)
- Virgin-martyr Anysia (1937)

== Other commemorations ==
- Repose of Elder Ephraim Moraitis of Philotheou and Arizona (2019) (Note: He reposed on Saturday December 7, 2019 at about 9:00pm or 10:00pm (MST) at St. Anthony’s Monastery in Florence, which he founded in 1995. Archbishop Elpidophoros of America co-officiated at the funeral service for Elder Ephraim on December 11, along with Metropolitans Alexios of Atlanta, Gerasimos of San Francisco and Isaiah of Denver. The Abbot of the Monastery of Philotheou, Elder Nikodimos, and several other Athonite fathers were also in attendance.) (see also: December 7 - N.S.)

== Icon gallery ==
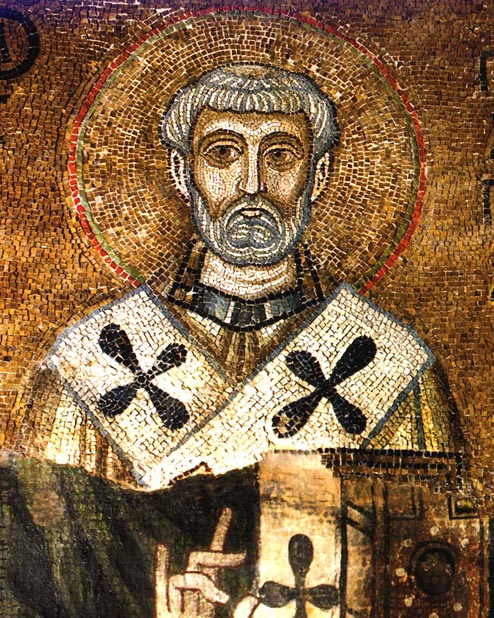
St. Clement I, one of the Seventy Apostles, the third Pope of Rome.

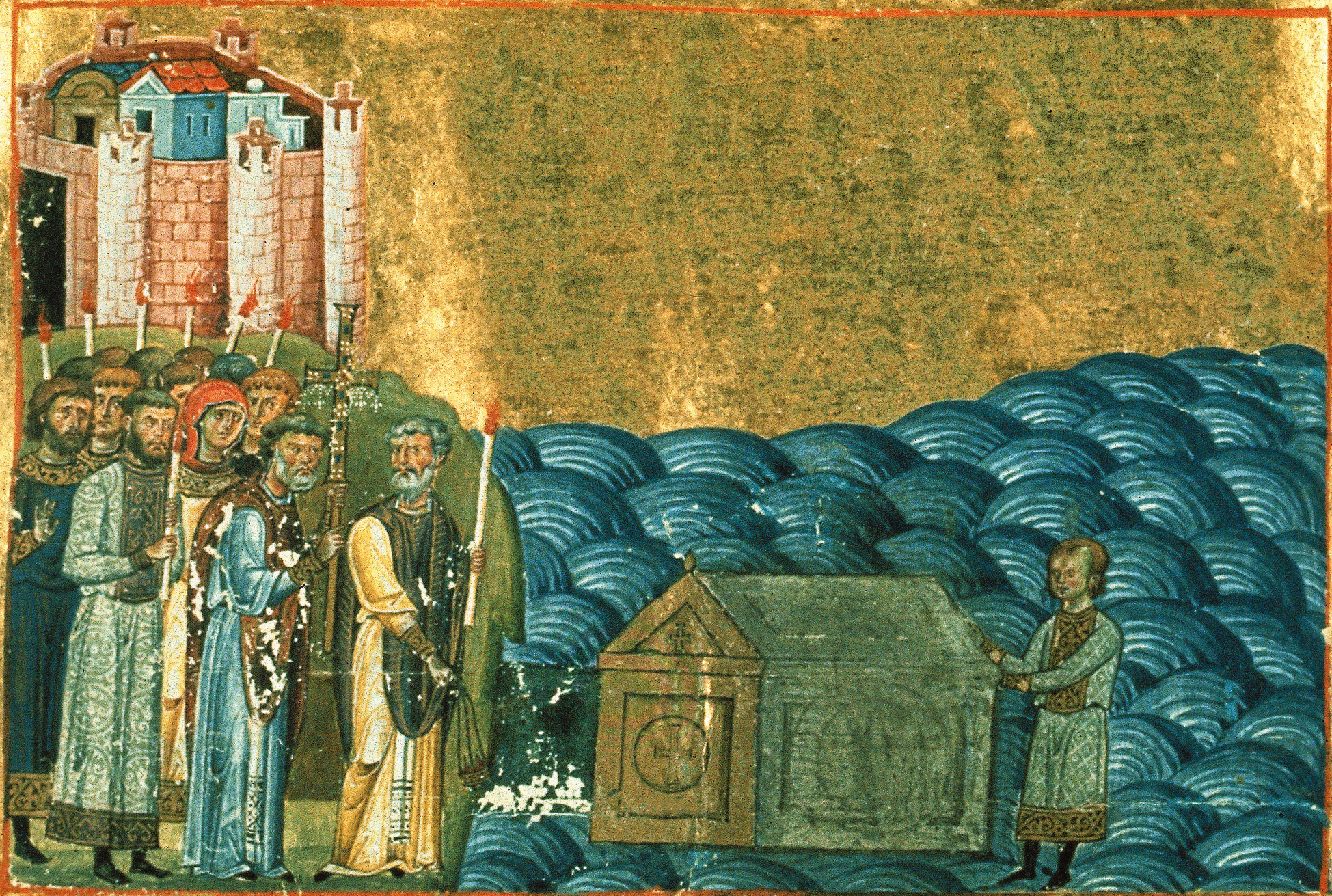
Translation of the relics of Hieromartyr Clement, Pope of Rome.
(Menologion of Basil II, 10th century).

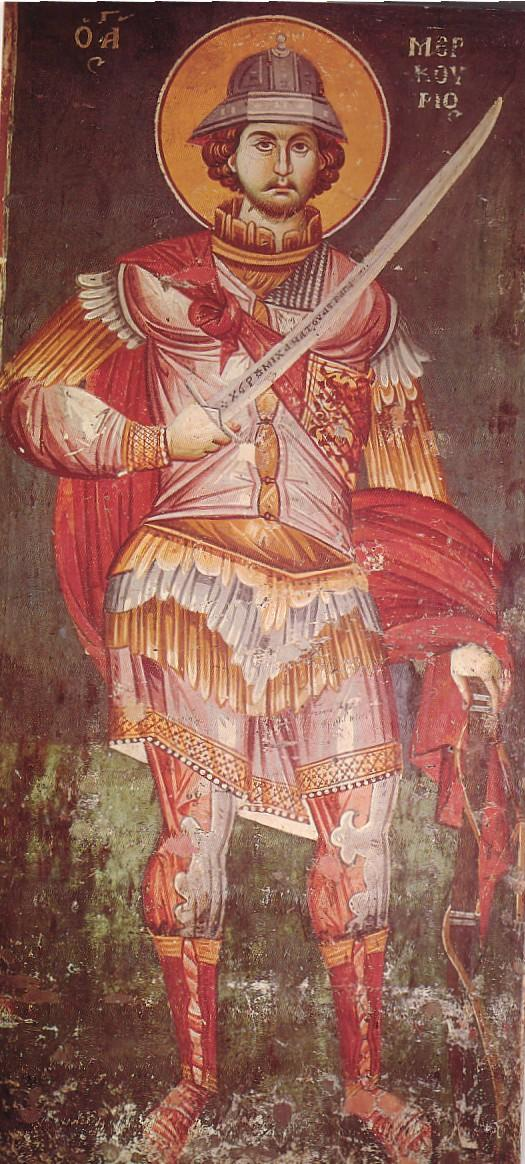
Great-martyr Mercurius of Caesarea in Cappadocia.

Great-martyr Mercurius of Caesarea in Cappadocia.
(Menologion of Basil II, 10th century).

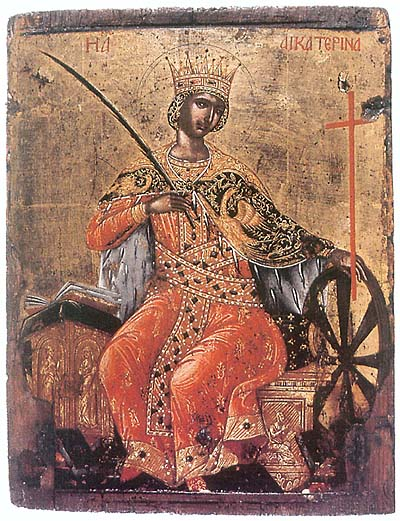
Great-martyr Catherine of Alexandria.

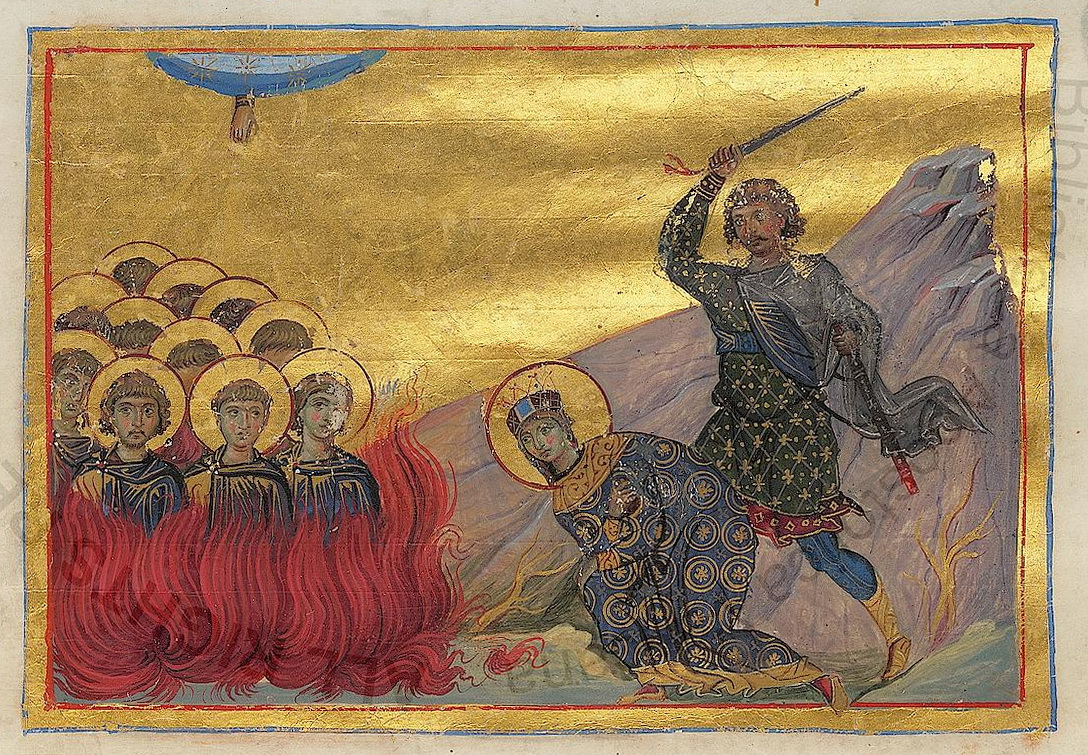
Martyrdom of Great-martyr Catherine of Alexandria.
(Menologion of Basil II, 10th century).

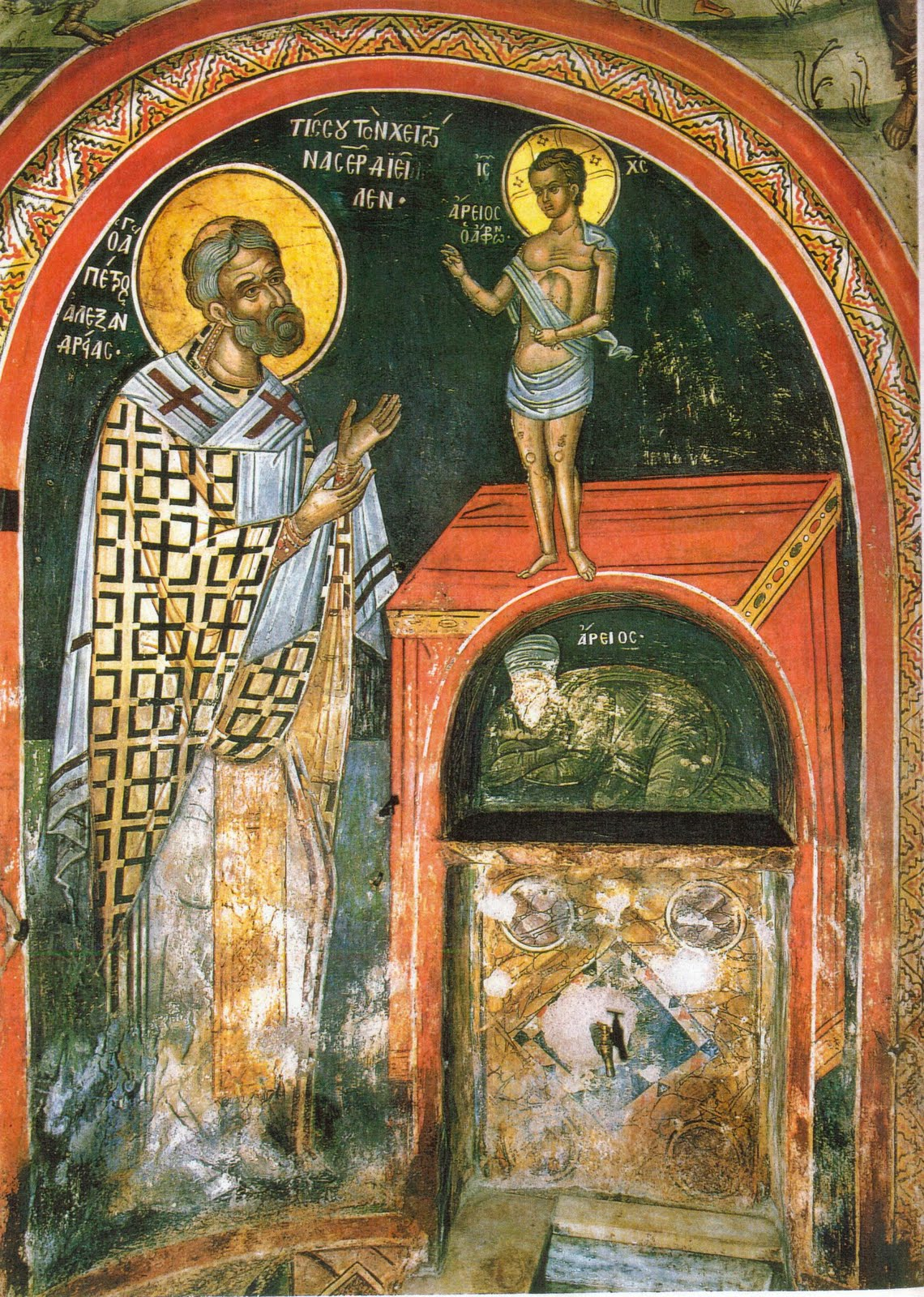
Vision of Peter of Alexandria.
(Dionysiou Monastery).

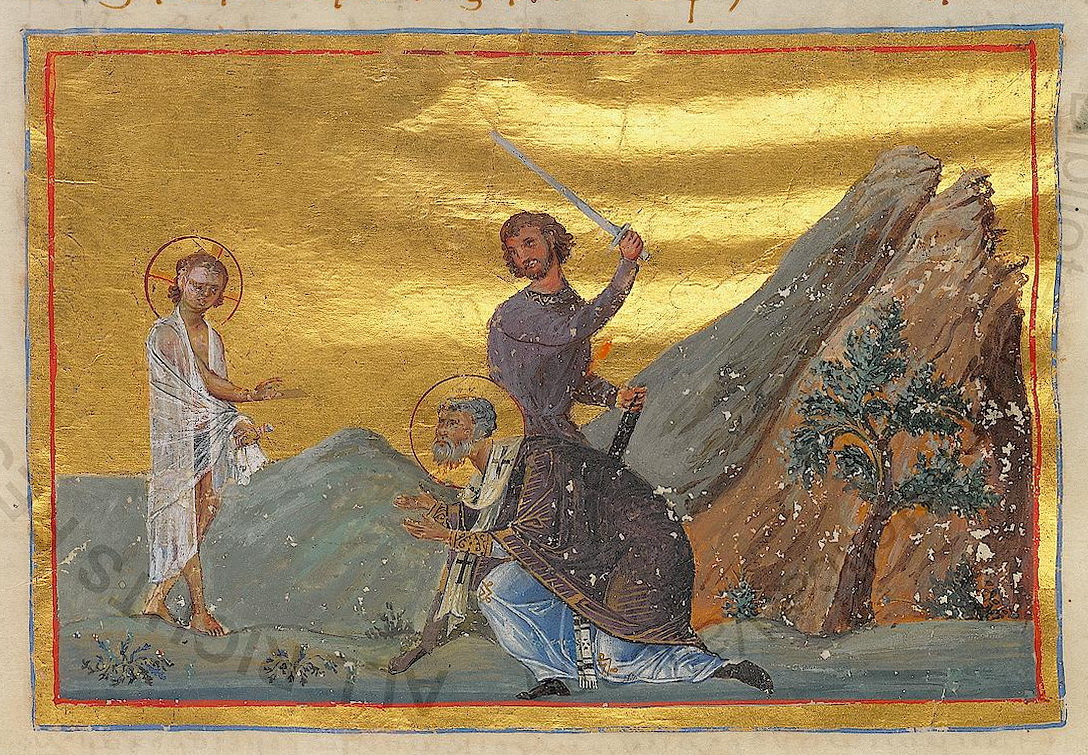
'Hieromartyr Peter I, Archbishop of Alexandria.
(Menologion of Basil II, 10th century).

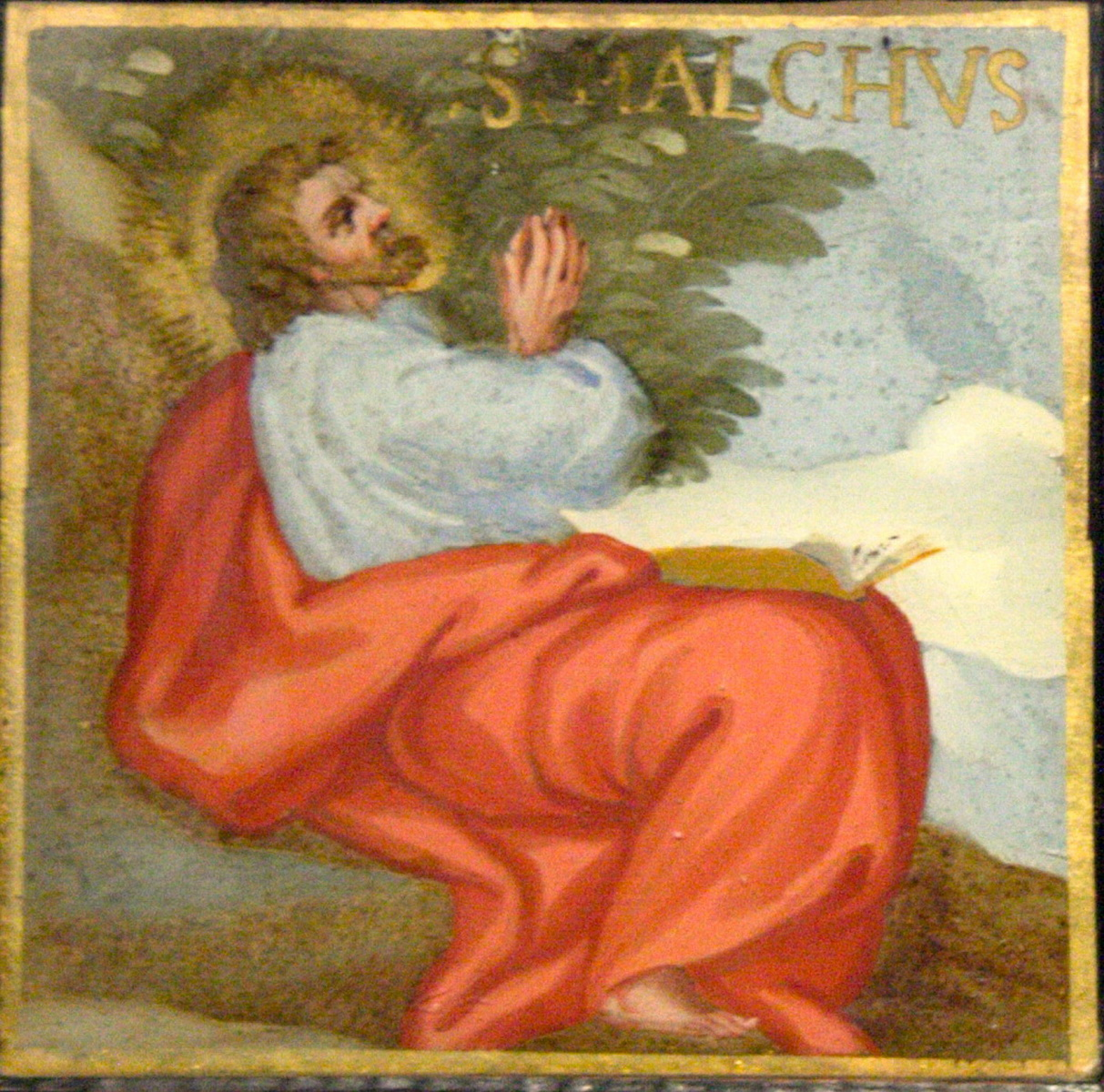
St. Malchus of Chalcis in Syria.

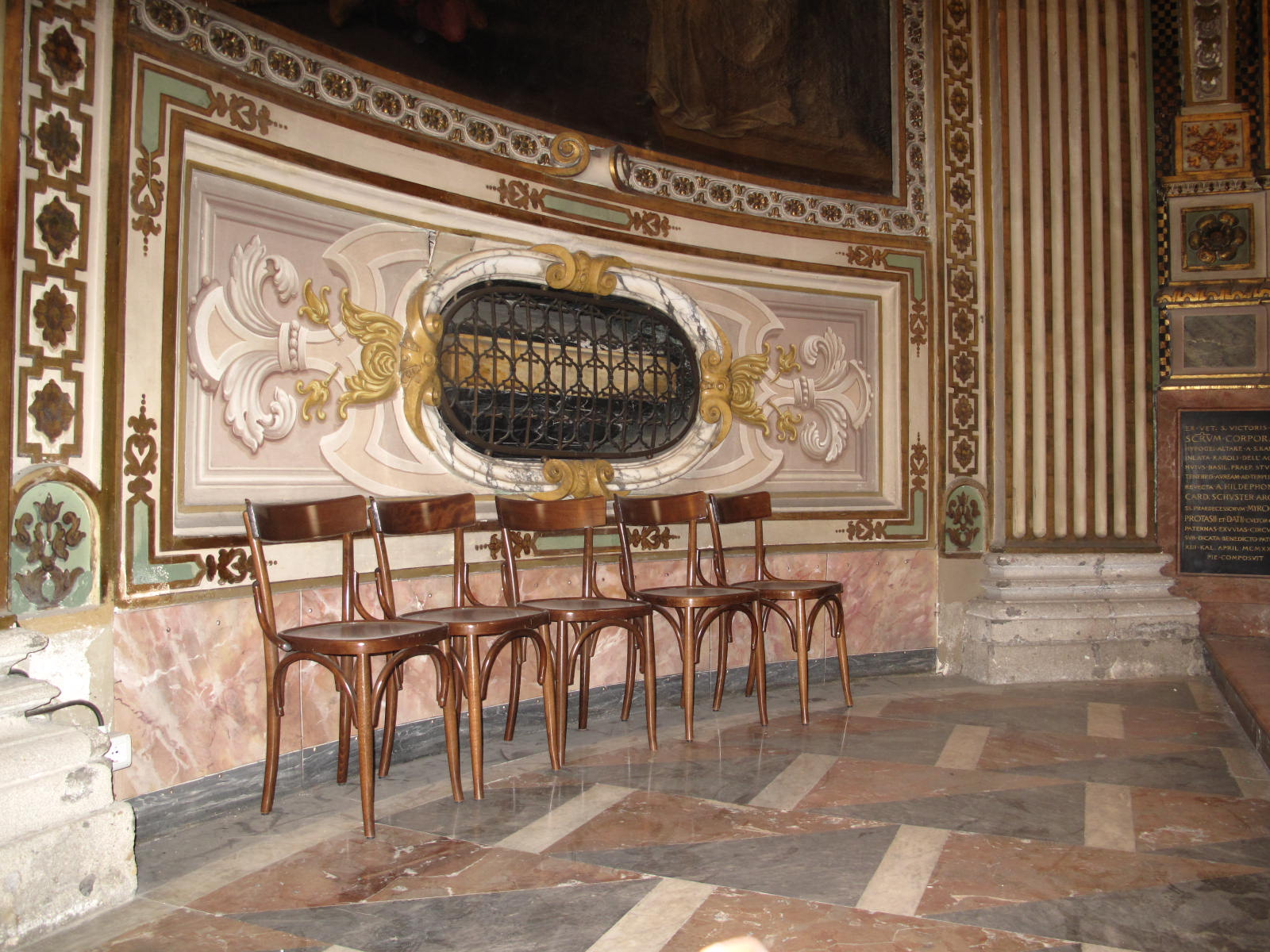
Reliquary of Venerable Protasius, Bishop of Milan.

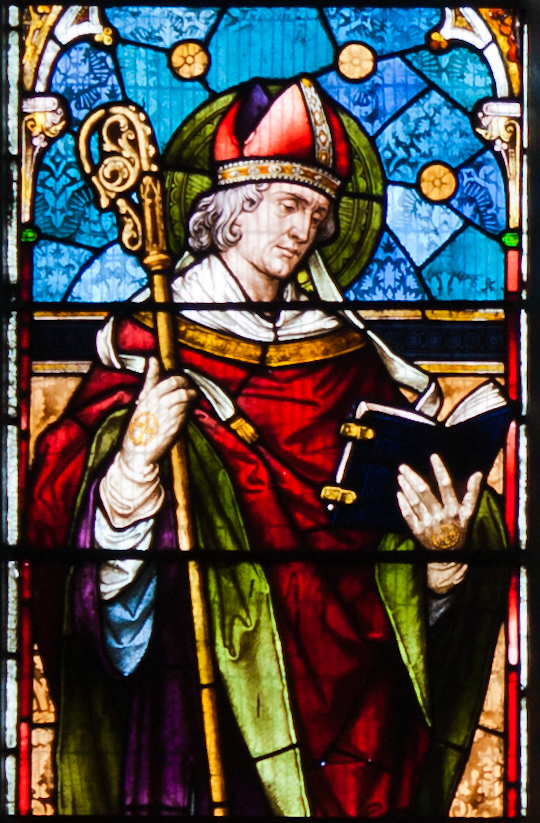
St. Colmán of Cloyne.

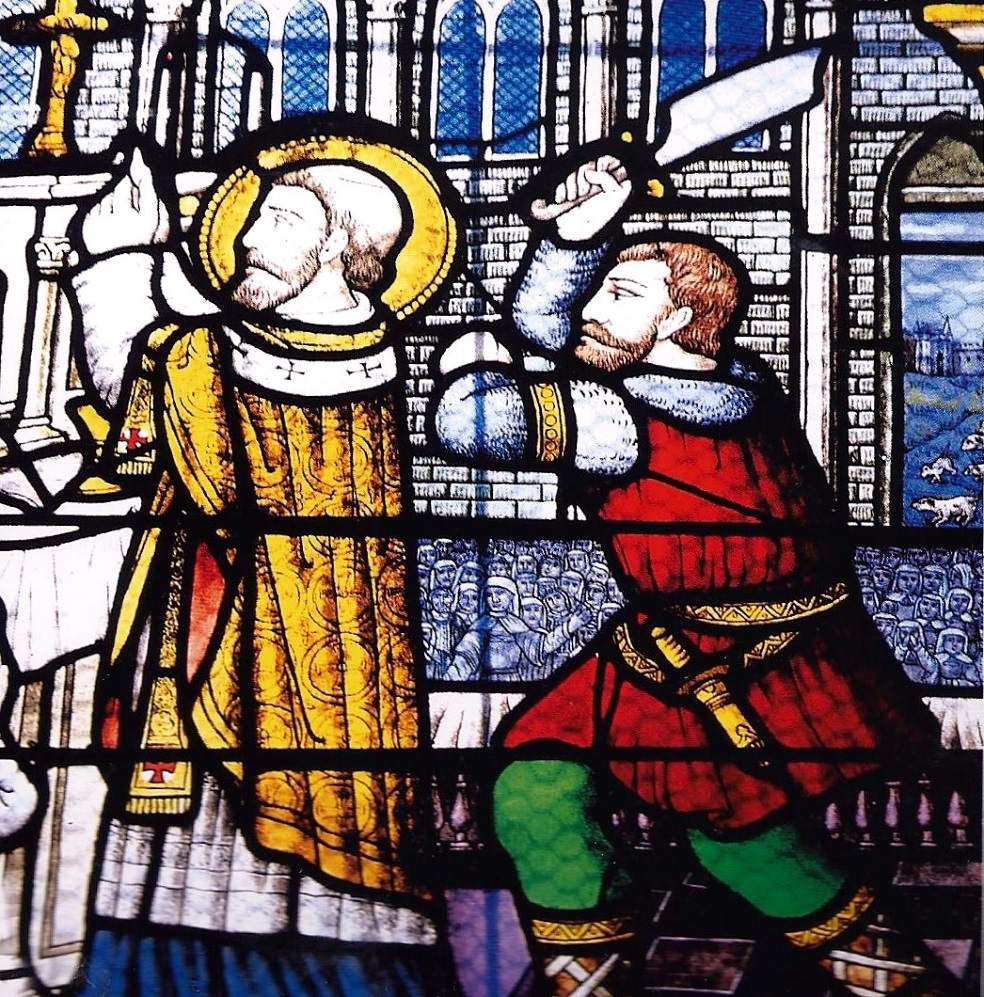
Martyrdom of St. Bieuzy.

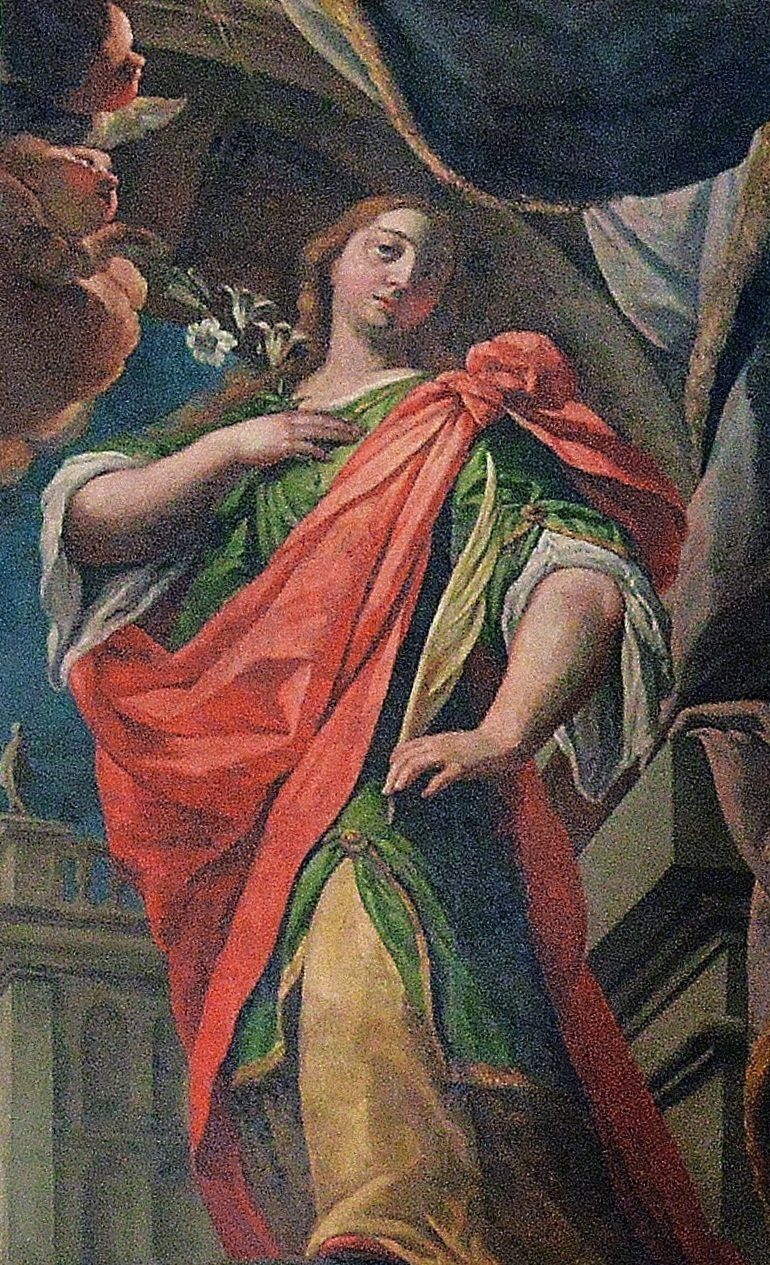
St. Flora, virgin-martyr in Cordoba in Spain.

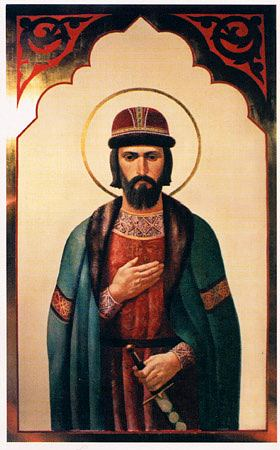
Hieromartyr Mercurius of Smolensk.

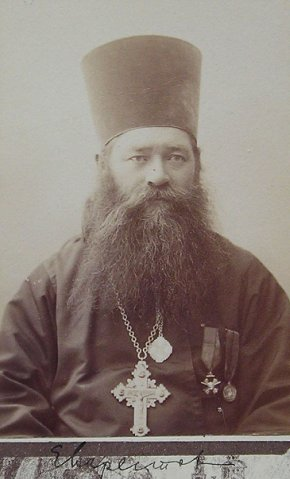
New Hieromartyr Eugraphus Evarestov.

== Sources ==
- November 24 / December 7. Orthodox Calendar (PRAVOSLAVIE.RU).
- December 7 / November 24. Holy Trinity Russian Orthodox Church (A parish of the Patriarchate of Moscow).
- November 24. OCA - The Lives of the Saints.
- The Autonomous Orthodox Metropolia of Western Europe and the Americas (ROCOR). St. Hilarion Calendar of Saints for the year of our Lord 2004. St. Hilarion Press (Austin, TX). p. 88.
- The Twenty-Fourth Day of the Month of November. Orthodoxy in China.
- November 24. Latin Saints of the Orthodox Patriarchate of Rome.
- The Roman Martyrology. Transl. by the Archbishop of Baltimore. Last Edition, According to the Copy Printed at Rome in 1914. Revised Edition, with the Imprimatur of His Eminence Cardinal Gibbons. Baltimore: John Murphy Company, 1916. pp. 362-363.
- Rev. Richard Stanton. A Menology of England and Wales, or, Brief Memorials of the Ancient British and English Saints Arranged According to the Calendar, Together with the Martyrs of the 16th and 17th Centuries. London: Burns & Oates, 1892. pp. 563–565.

Greek Sources

- Great Synaxaristes: (in Greek) 24 ΝΟΕΜΒΡΙΟΥ. ΜΕΓΑΣ ΣΥΝΑΞΑΡΙΣΤΗΣ.
- (in Greek) Συναξαριστής. 24 Νοεμβρίου. ECCLESIA.GR. (H ΕΚΚΛΗΣΙΑ ΤΗΣ ΕΛΛΑΔΟΣ).
- (in Greek) November 24. Ορθόδοξος Συναξαριστής.

Russian Sources

- (in Russian) 7 декабря (24 ноября). Православная Энциклопедия под редакцией Патриарха Московского и всея Руси Кирилла (электронная версия). (Orthodox Encyclopedia - Pravenc.ru).
- (in Russian) 24 ноября по старому стилю / 7 декабря по новому стилю. Русская Православная Церковь - Православный церковный календарь на 2018 год.
