= November 25 (Eastern Orthodox liturgics) =

Day in the Eastern Orthodox liturgical calendar

Eastern Orthodox liturgical calendar
November 24	November 25	November 26
November 25 O.S. ≍ December 8 N.S. November 25 N.S ≍ November 12 O.S.

An Eastern Orthodox cross

November 25 in Eastern Orthodox liturgical calendars is a feast day and a day of commemoration of saints and martyrs. Although some Orthodox churches use the Revised Julian Calendar and others use the traditional Julian calendar, the fixed commemorations for their respective November 25 are broadly the same, no matter which calendar is used. (Note: Despite the dates being the same, the days to which they refer typically differ by 13 days. The notation Old Style or O.S. is sometimes used to indicate a date in the traditional Julian Calendar (the "Old Calendar"). The notation New Style or N.S. indicates a date in the Revised Julian calendar (the "New Calendar").)

== Feasts ==
- Apodosis of the Entry of the Most Holy Theotokos into the Temple.

== Saints ==
- Hieromartyr Clement I, Pope of Rome (101) (Note: One of the Seventy Apostles, he was the third Pope of Rome. Consecrated by the Apostle Peter, he is mentioned in Philippians 4,3 and wrote a letter to the Church of Corinth which still exists. He is venerated as a martyr and he is remembered in Rome by the church of San Clemente, which may have been built on the site of his home. (In the East: Jan 4, Apr 22, Sept 10 and Nov 25).) (Russian use only. See also: November 24)
- Great-martyr Mercurius of Caesarea in Cappadocia (259) (Note: "At Caesarea, in Cappadocia, St. Mercury, soldier, who vanquished the barbarians and triumphed over the cruelty of Decius through the protection of his guardian angel. Finally, having acquired great glory from his sufferings, he was crowned with martyrdom and went to reign forever in heaven." Name days celebrated today include: Merkourios (Μερκούριος); Mercurius / Mercury.) (Note: The region known as the "Mercurion" (it) in Southern Italy, within the Pollino massif of the Southern Apennines, on the Calabrian-Lucanian border, was a territory where Eastern Greek monasticism flourished for many centuries. Generally, the origin of this name is thought to refer either to the existence of an ancient temple of the god Mercury, or alternatively, to the cult paid by the monks to Saint Mercurius, being a very popular cult in southern Italy during the Middle Ages. The beginnings of the Mercurion in the sixth century and its subsequent evolution is related to several reasons, including the iconoclastic crisis, and the Arab conquest of Syria and Egypt in the sixth century, and of Sicily in the ninth century. The period of maximum splendor of this area was reached in the X-XI centuries, in which the Mercurion was called the "New Thebaid", becoming one of the major centers of mysticism.) (see also: November 24 - Russian use)
- Great-martyr Catherine of Alexandria (305) (Note: "THE birthday of St. Catharine, virgin and martyr, under the emperor Maximinus. For the confession of the Christian faith, she was cast into prison at Alexandria, and afterwards endured a long scourging with whips garnished with metal, and finally ended her martyrdom by decapitation. Her body was miraculously conveyed by angels to Mount Sinai, where pious veneration is paid to it by a great concourse of Christians." Name days celebrated today include: Catherine (Κατερίνα).) (see also: November 24 - Russian)
- Holy 150 Orators, martyred by fire, with Great-martyr Catherine of Alexandria (305)
- Martyrs Augusta (Faustina) the Empress, by beheading, Porphyrius Stratelates and 200 soldiers at Alexandria, by the sword (305) (see also: November 24 - Russian)
- Holy 670 Martyrs, by the sword.
- Hieromartyr Peter, Archbishop of Alexandria (311) (see also: November 24 - Greek)
- Venerable Peter the Silent (the Hesychast), of Galatia and Antioch (c. 403 or 429) (Note: This St. Peter should not be confused with the other St. Peter of Galatia (9th century), who is commemorated on October 9.) (see also: February 1)
- Saint Clement of Ohrid (Achrida), Bishop of Greater Macedonia, Enlightener of Bulgaria and Wonderworker (916) (see also: November 22)

== Pre-Schism Western saints ==
- Hieromartyr Moses, a priest in Rome, noted for his zeal in preaching the Gospel and his firm stand against Novatianism, martyred under Decius (251) (Note: "At Rome, St. Moses, priest and martyr, who, with others detained in prison, was often consoled by the letters of St. Cyprian. After he had withstood with unbending courage not only the Gentiles, but also the Novatian schismatics and heretics, he was finally, in the persecution of Decius, crowned with a martyrdom which fills the mind with admiration, according to the words of pope St. Cornelius.")
- Saint Jucunda, a holy virgin in Reggio in Aemilia in Italy and a spiritual daughter of St Prosper, Bishop of that city (466)
- Saint Alanus, Abbot and founder of Lavaur in Gascony in France (7th century)
- Saint Imma (Immina), born in Würzburg, she became abbess of a convent in Karlburg in Germany (c. 752)
- Saint Bernold, monk-priest of Ottobeuren Abbey in Bavaria in Germany, renowned as a wonderworker (c. 1050)

== Post-Schism Orthodox saints ==
—

=== New martyrs and confessors ===
- Martyr Magdalena Zabelina (1931)
- New Hieromartyr Seraphim Ostroumov, Archbishop of Smolensk (1937) (Note: See: (in Russian) Серафим (Остроумов). Википедии. (Russian Wikipedia).)
- New Hieromartyr Yaroslav Savitsky, Protopresbyter of Moscow (1937)
- New Hieromartyrs Hilarion Soloviev and Simeon Afonkin, Priests, of Alma Ata (1937)
- New Hieromartyr John Vladimirsky of Tver (1937)
- New Hieromartyr Cosmas Korotkikh of Moscow (1937)
- New Hieromartyrs Gregory Voinov, Basil Pariysky, John Tarasov, Alexander Vershinsky, John Janushev, (Note: See: (in Russian) Янушев, Иван Васильевич. Википедии. (Russian Wikipedia).) Victor Smirnov, Andrew Shershnev, Priests (1937)
- New Hieromartyr Varlaam Popov (1937)
- Martyr Paul Kuzovkov (1937)
- Martyr Nicholas Kopninsky (1938)

== Other commemorations ==
- Repose of priest Pavel Florensky of Sergiev Posad (1937)
- Repose of Protopriest Rostislav Gan in Australia (1975)

== Icon gallery ==
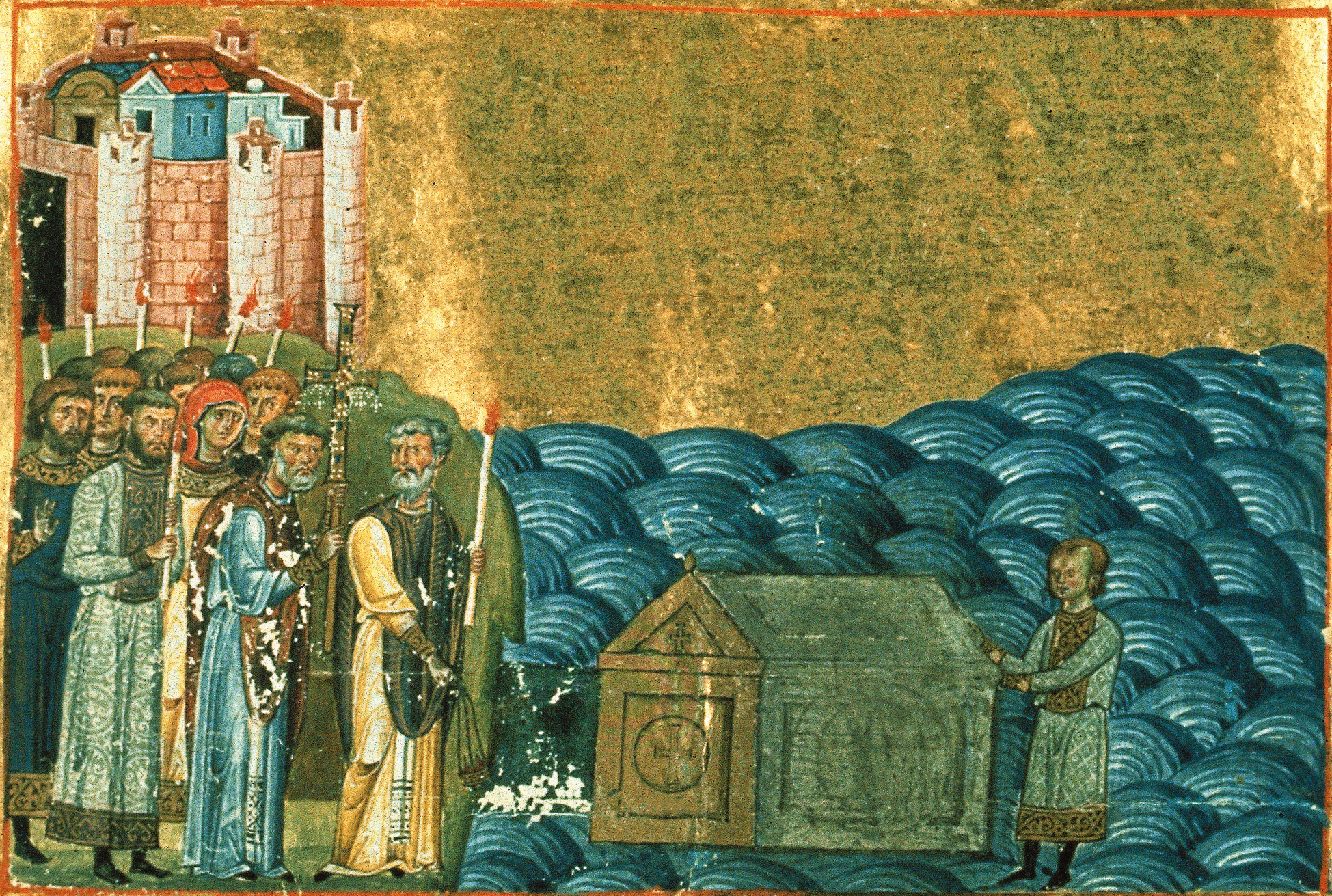
Translation of the relics of Hieromartyr Clement, Pope of Rome.
(Menologion of Basil II, 10th century).

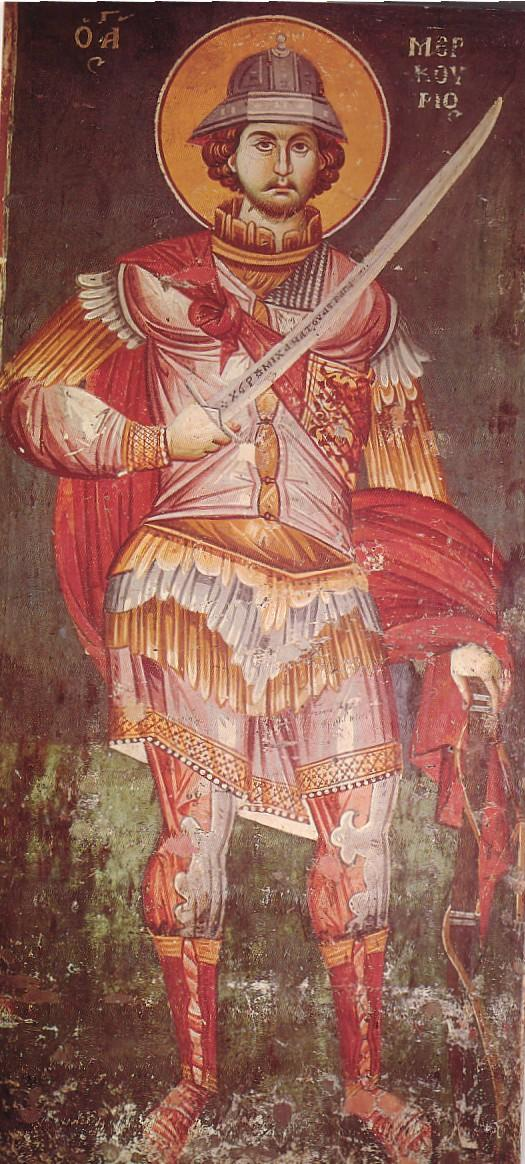
Great-martyr Mercurius of Caesarea in Cappadocia.

Great-martyr Mercurius of Caesarea in Cappadocia.
(Menologion of Basil II, 10th century).

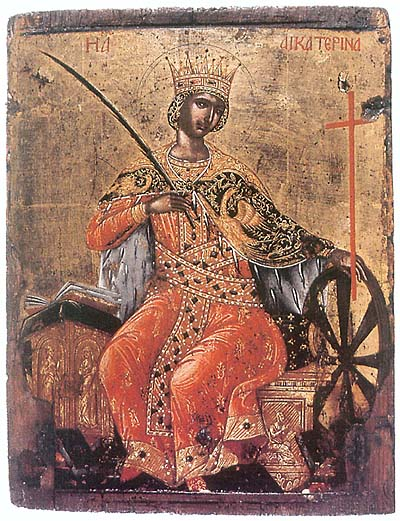
Great-martyr Catherine of Alexandria.

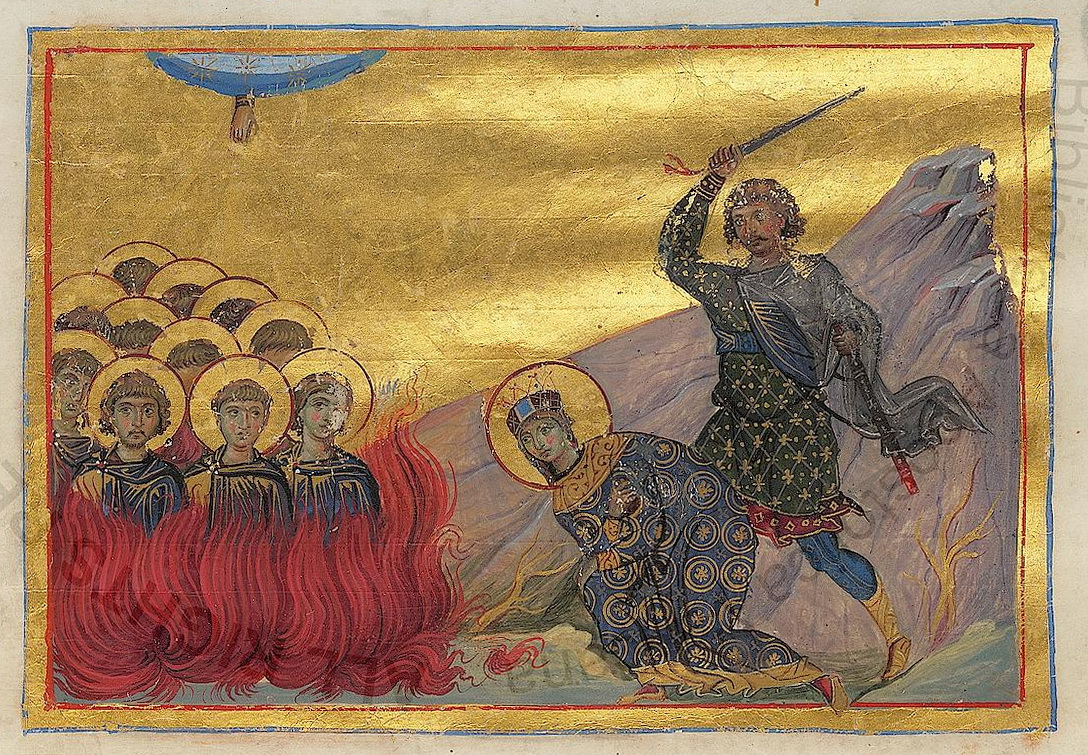
Martyrdom of Great-martyr Catherine of Alexandria.
(Menologion of Basil II, 10th century).

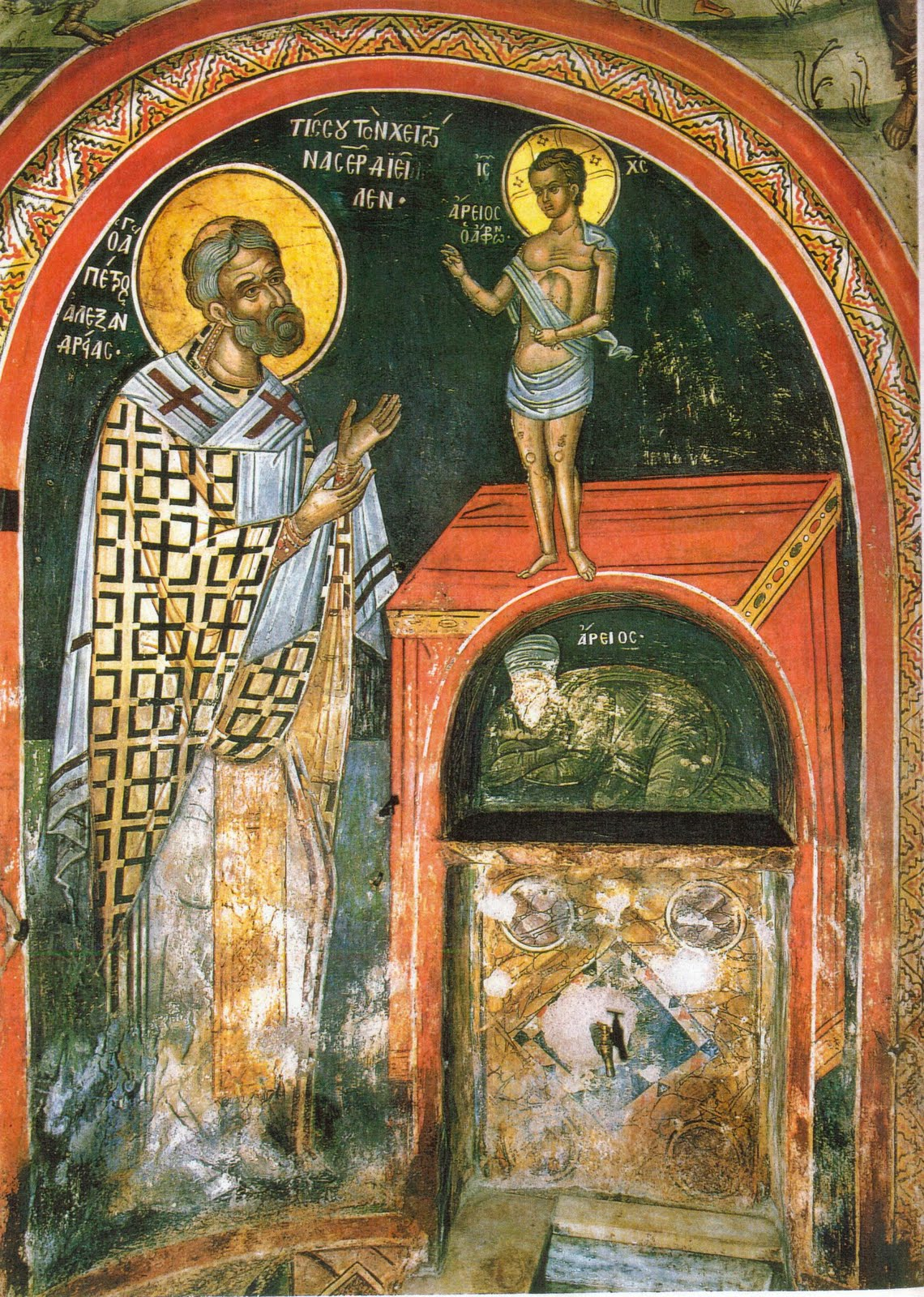
Vision of Peter of Alexandria.
(Dionysiou Monastery).

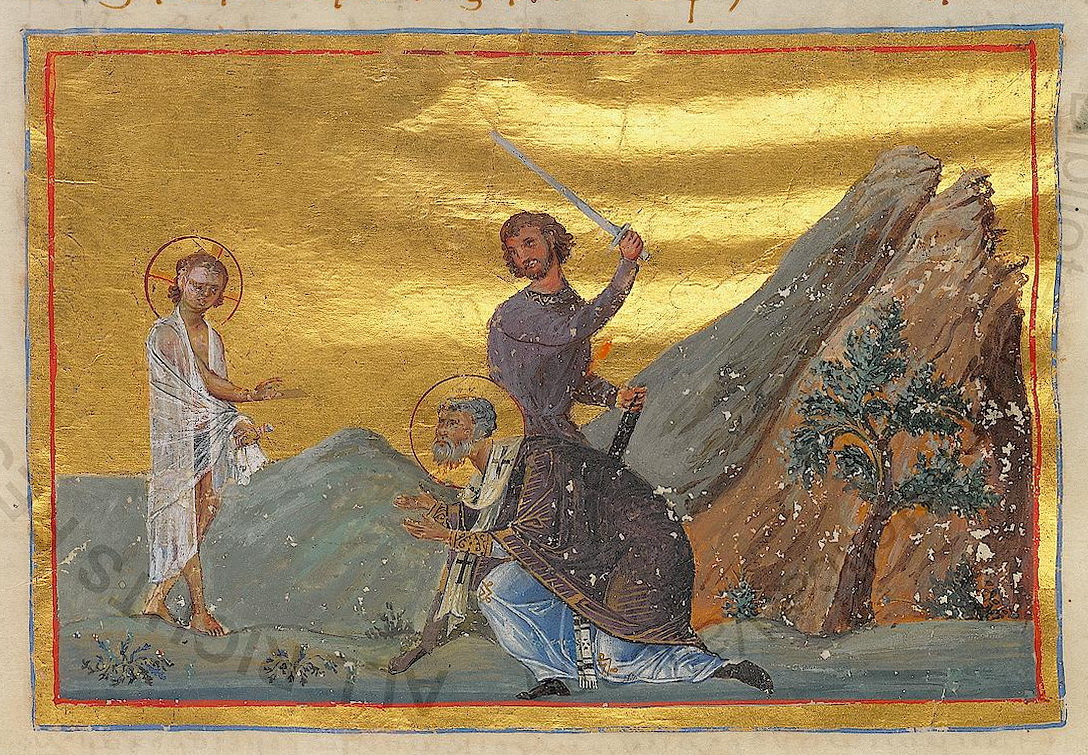
'Hieromartyr Peter I, Archbishop of Alexandria.
(Menologion of Basil II, 10th century).

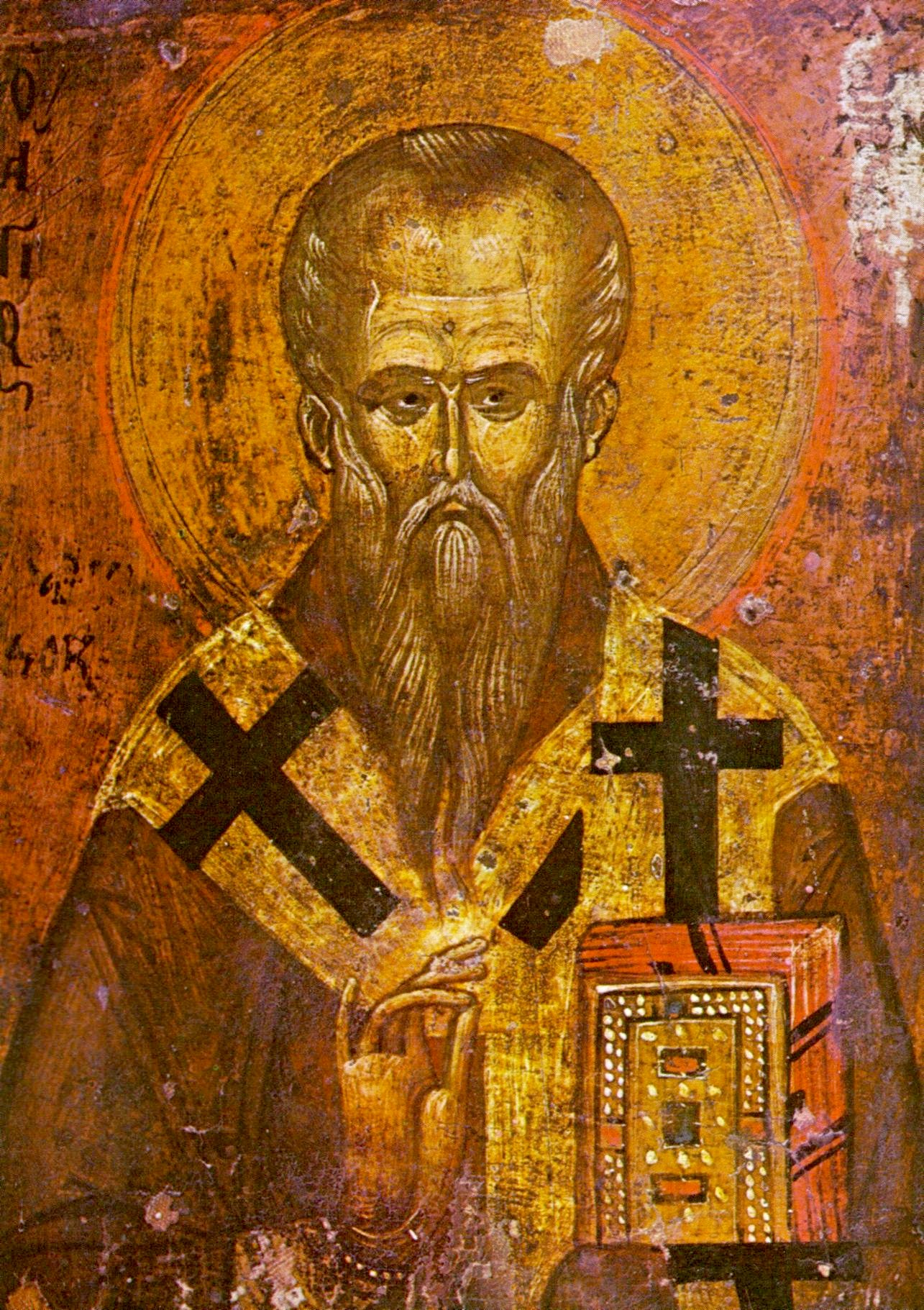
Saint Clement of Ochrid.

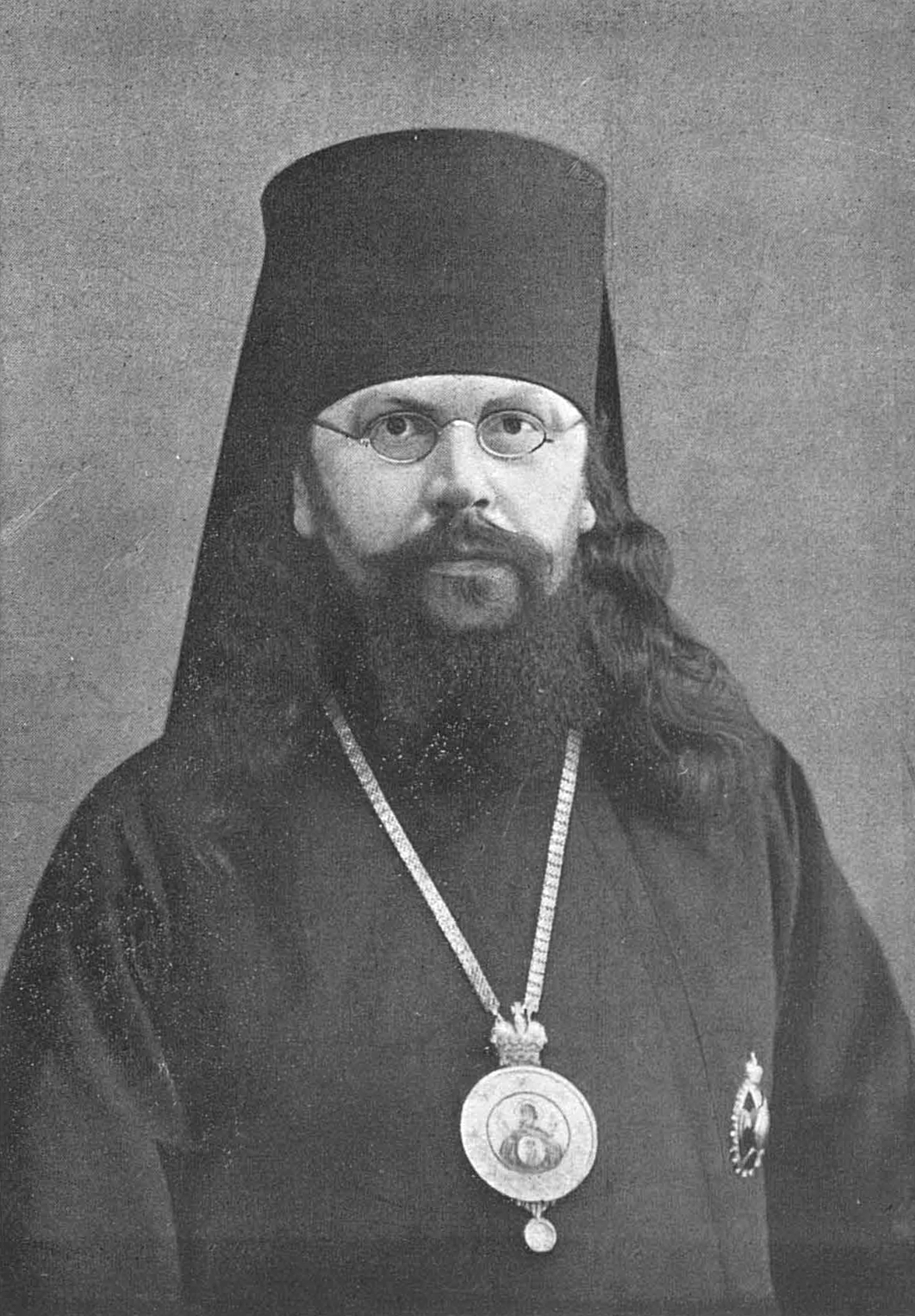
Hieromartyr Seraphim (Ostroumov), Archbishop of Smolensk.

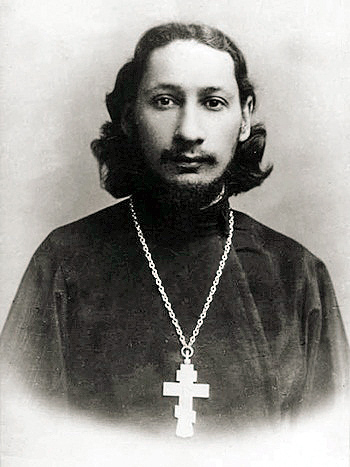
Fr. Pavel Florensky.

== Sources ==
- November 25 / December 8. Orthodox Calendar (PRAVOSLAVIE.RU).
- December 8 / November 25. Holy Trinity Russian Orthodox Church (A parish of the Patriarchate of Moscow).
- November 25. OCA - The Lives of the Saints.
- The Autonomous Orthodox Metropolia of Western Europe and the Americas (ROCOR). St. Hilarion Calendar of Saints for the year of our Lord 2004. St. Hilarion Press (Austin, TX). p. 88.
- The Twenty-Fifth Day of the Month of November. Orthodoxy in China.
- November 25. Latin Saints of the Orthodox Patriarchate of Rome.
- The Roman Martyrology. Transl. by the Archbishop of Baltimore. Last Edition, According to the Copy Printed at Rome in 1914. Revised Edition, with the Imprimatur of His Eminence Cardinal Gibbons. Baltimore: John Murphy Company, 1916. pp. 363–364.
- Rev. Richard Stanton. A Menology of England and Wales, or, Brief Memorials of the Ancient British and English Saints Arranged According to the Calendar, Together with the Martyrs of the 16th and 17th Centuries. London: Burns & Oates, 1892. pp. 565–566.

Greek Sources

- Great Synaxaristes: (in Greek) 25 ΝΟΕΜΒΡΙΟΥ. ΜΕΓΑΣ ΣΥΝΑΞΑΡΙΣΤΗΣ.
- (in Greek) Συναξαριστής. 25 Νοεμβρίου. ECCLESIA.GR. (H ΕΚΚΛΗΣΙΑ ΤΗΣ ΕΛΛΑΔΟΣ).
- (in Greek) November 25. Ορθόδοξος Συναξαριστής.

Russian Sources

- (in Russian) 8 декабря (25 ноября). Православная Энциклопедия под редакцией Патриарха Московского и всея Руси Кирилла (электронная версия). (Orthodox Encyclopedia - Pravenc.ru).
- (in Russian) 25 ноября по старому стилю / 8 декабря по новому стилю. Русская Православная Церковь - Православный церковный календарь на 2018 год.
