= November 22 (Eastern Orthodox liturgics) =

Day in the Eastern Orthodox liturgical calendar

Eastern Orthodox liturgical calendar
November 21	November 22	November 23
November 22 O.S. ≍ December 5 N.S. November 22 N.S ≍ November 9 O.S.

An Eastern Orthodox cross

November 22 in Eastern Orthodox liturgical calendars is a feast day and a day of commemoration of saints and martyrs. Although some Orthodox churches use the Revised Julian Calendar and others use the traditional Julian calendar, the fixed commemorations for their respective November 22 are broadly the same, no matter which calendar is used. (Note: Despite the dates being the same, the days to which they refer typically differ by 13 days. The notation Old Style or O.S. is sometimes used to indicate a date in the traditional Julian Calendar (the "Old Calendar"). The notation New Style or N.S. indicates a date in the Revised Julian calendar (the "New Calendar").)

== Feasts ==
- Afterfeast of the Entry of the Most Holy Theotokos into the Temple.

== Saints ==
- Apostles of the 70, Philemon and Archippus, Martyr Apphia (wife of Philemon and Equal to the Apostles), and St. Onesimus, disciple of Saint Paul (c. 109) (Note: "At Colossae, in Phrygia, during the reign of Nero, Saints Philemon and Apphias, disciples of St. Paul. When the Gentiles rushed into the church on the feast of Diana, they were arrested whilst the other Christians fled, and by the command of the governor Artocles, were scourged, let down into a pit up to their waist, and overwhelmed with stones.") (Note: Name days celebrated today include: Philemon (Φιλήμων).)
- Martyrs Cecilia, Valerian, Tiburtius, and Maximus (Note: "Saint Maximus the Martyr the Capitularius" (Tax Collector). Maximus was prison guard of a prison in Rome. He believed in Christ through the witness of Saints Valerian and Cecelia, confessed his faith and suffered a martyric death (Greek: αἰκισθεῖς τελειοῦται).) at Rome (c. 230 or 288) (Note: "AT Rome, St. Cecilia, virgin and martyr, who brought to the faith of Christ her spouse Valerian and his brother Tiburtius, and encouraged them to martyrdom. After their death, being arrested by order of Almachius, prefect of the city, and exposed to the fire, from which she came out uninjured, she terminated her glorious sufferings by the sword, in the time of the emperor Marcus Aurelius Severus Alexander.") (Note: One of the most famous virgin-martyrs of Rome. Having suffered for Christ, she was buried in the cemetery of St Callistus. Her relics are beneath the altar of the basilica of St Cecilia in Trastevere. She is the patroness-saint of musicians.)
- Martyr Menignus at Parium, the Tanner, by beheading (250)
- Martyrs Stephen, Mark, and Mark at Antioch in Pisidia, by beheading (290) (Note: "At Antioch, in Pisidia, the martyrdom of the Saints Mark and Stephen, under the emperor Diocletian.")
- Martyr Procopius the Reader at Caesarea in Palestine, by the sword (303) (Note: "The Holy Martyr Procopius was a reader in the Church of Jerusalem. He led a strict ascetic life, for which he received from the Lord the ability to cast out demons. The zealous preacher of the Word of God was arrested and brought to trial in Palestinian Caesarea. For his refusal to offer sacrifice to idols, he was beheaded.")
- Martyr Agapion of Greece (Agapionos the Roman) (304) (Note: Because he confessed Christ, they threw him as food for the wild beasts. But miraculously he was delivered unharmed and reposed in peace.)
- Martyr Agapios of Cappadocia, by the sword. (Note: Parisian Codex 1578 records that he was from Cappadocia.)
- Martyr Thaddeus. (Note: Tied up and left to die on a downward slope (declivity).)
- Martyrs Christopher and Euphemia, by the sword. (Note: They are likely the same martyrs as those commemorated on November 19.)
- Martyrs Thallelaius and Anthimus, by the sword.
- Hieromartyr Sisinius, by the sword. (see also: November 23)
- Venerable Agabbas (Abbas) of Syria (5th century)
- Righteous Michael the Soldier of Potuka, Bulgaria (866)
- Venerable Germanus, founder of the Holy Monastery of the Theotokos Eikoiphinissa, in the Metropolis of Drama, Greece (Macedonia) (9th century)
- Saint Clement of Ochrid, Bishop of Ohrid (Achrida), Enlightener of Bulgaria and Wonderworker (916) (see also: July 27)

== Pre-Schism Western saints ==
- Martyr Maurus, born of Christian parents in North Africa, he was martyred in Rome under Numerian. (Note: "Also, at Rome, St. Maurus, martyr, who, coming from Africa to visit the tombs of the Apostles, was condemned to die, under the emperor Numerian, Celerinus being prefect of the city.")
- Saint Pragmatius, Bishop of Autun in France (c. 520) (Note: "At Autun, St. Pragmatius, bishop and confessor.")
- Saint Deyniolen (Deiniol the Younger), Abbot of Bangor Abbey in Wales (621) (Note: "In Wales, the festival of"ST. DEYNIOLEN, Virgin.")
- Saint Sabinian, Third Abbot of Moutier-Saint-Chaffre in France (c. 720)
- Saint Christian, thirty-seventh Bishop of Auxerre in France (c. 873)
- Saint Tigridia (Trigidia), Abbess of San Salvador de Oña, which her father Count Sancho Garcia founded for her to direct (c. 925)

== Post-Schism Orthodox saints ==
- Blessed Yaropolk-Peter, Prince of Vladimir in Volhynia (1086)
- Martyrdom of Saint Michael (Mikhail), Prince of Tver (1318)
- Venerable Callistus II Xanothopoulos, Hesychast monk of Mount Athos and Ecumenical Patriarch of Constantinople (1397)
- Venerable Iakovos Tsalikis of Euboea (Evia) the New Ascetic, Igumen of the Monastery of Saint David the Elder in Euboea (1991) (Note: With the approval and recommendation of the Church of Greece, on November 27, 2017, the Sacred and Holy Synod of the Ecumenical Patriarchate formally glorified Archimandrite Elder Iakovos (Tsalikis) (†1991), Igumen of the Monastery of Saint David the Elder in Euboea. His feast day was set on November 22 each year: (in Greek) "Κατ᾿ αὐτήν, ἡ Ἁγία καί Ἱερά Σύνοδος ὁμοφώνως ἀποδεχθεῖσα εἰσήγησιν τῆς Κανονικῆς Ἐπιτροπῆς ἀνέγραψεν εἰς τό Ἁγιολόγιον τῆς Ὀρθοδόξου Ἐκκλησίας τόν μακαριστόν Ἀρχιμανδρίτην Ἰάκωβον Τσαλίκην, ἐκ Λιβισίου Μικρᾶς Ἀσίας, Ἡγούμενον τῆς ἐν Β. Εὐβοίᾳ Ἱερᾶς Μονῆς Ὁσίου Δαυΐβ τοῦ Γέροντος, τῆς μνήμης αὐτοῦ ὁρισθείσης διά τήν 22αν Νοεμβρίου ἑκάστου ἔτους.") (Note: See: (in Greek) Άγιος Ιάκωβος Τσαλίκης. Βικιπαίδεια. (Greek Wikipedia).)

=== New martyrs and confessors ===
- New Hieromartyr Vladimir Ryasensky of Tver, Priest (1932)
- New Hieromartyr Joasaph Zhevakhov, Bishop of Mogilev (1937) (Note: See: (in Russian) Иоасаф (Жевахов). Википедии. (Russian Wikipedia).)
- New Hieromartyr Gerasim Mochalov, Hieromonk of the Zosima Hermitage, Smolensk (1937)
- New Hieromartyrs Alexis Benemanskii (Benemansky) (Note: See: (in Russian) Бенеманский, Алексей Константинович. Википедии. (Russian Wikipedia).) and Elias (Elijah) Gromoglasov, (Note: See: (in Russian) Громогласов, Илья Михайлович. Википедии. (Russian Wikipedia).) Archpriests of Tver, and Athanasius Milov, Priest of Chimkent (1937)
- New Monk-martyrs Eutychius Didenko, Abner Sinitsyn, Sava Suslov, and Mark Makhrov, of Optina Monastery, and with them New Martyr Boris Kozlov (1937)
- New Hieromartyrs John Smirnov, Basil Bov, Paul Evdokimov, Jacob Sokolov, Theodore Gusiev, John Baranov, Priests (1937)
- Venerable Paraskeva (Matieshina), Confessor (1953)

== Icon gallery ==
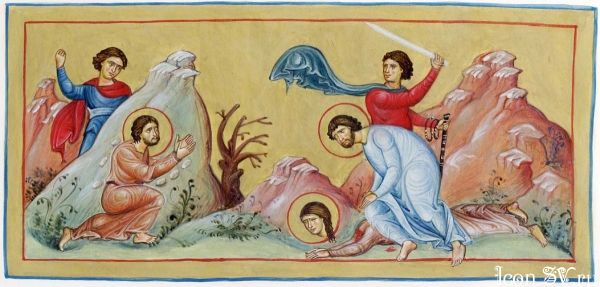
Apostles Philemon and Apphia.

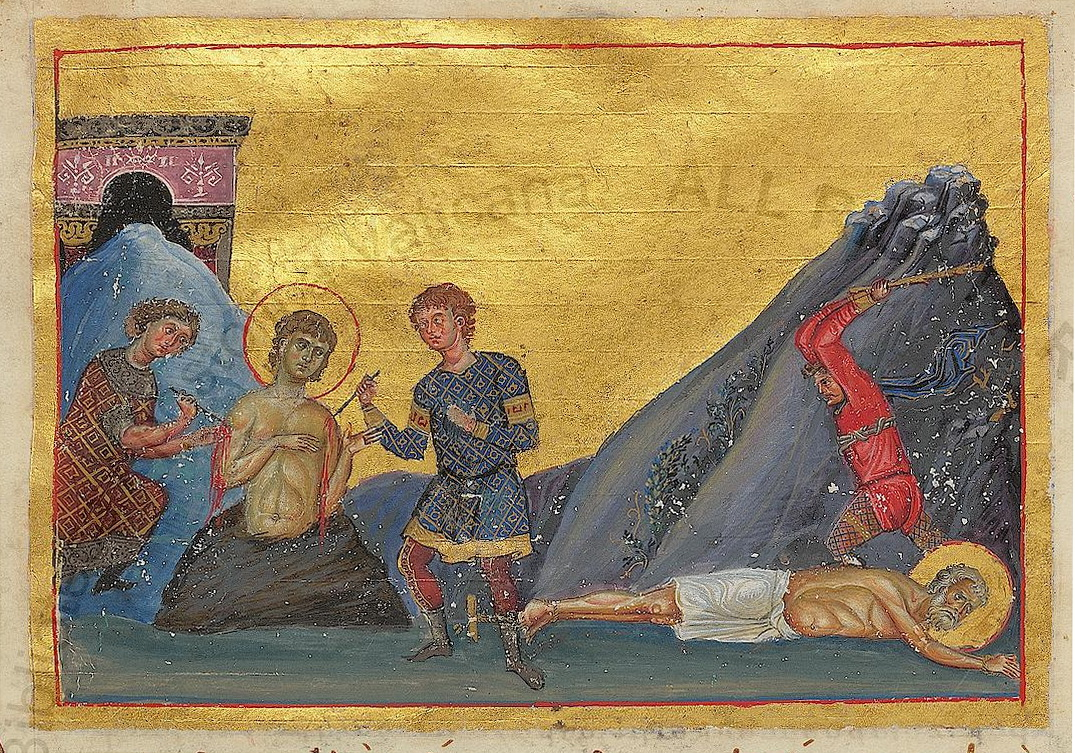
Apostles of the 70, Philemon and Archippus.
(Menologion of Basil II, 10th century).

Martyrs Stephen and Mark, at Antioch in Pisidia.
(Menologion of Basil II, 10th century).

Martyrs Cecilia, Valerian, and Tiburtius.
(Menologion of Basil II, 10th century).

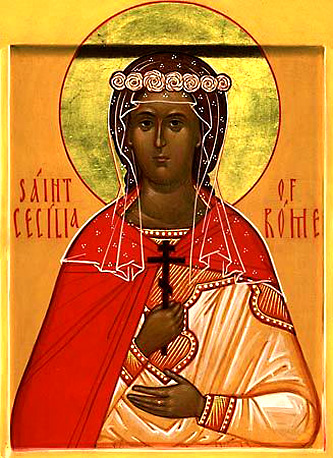
St. Cecilia of Rome.

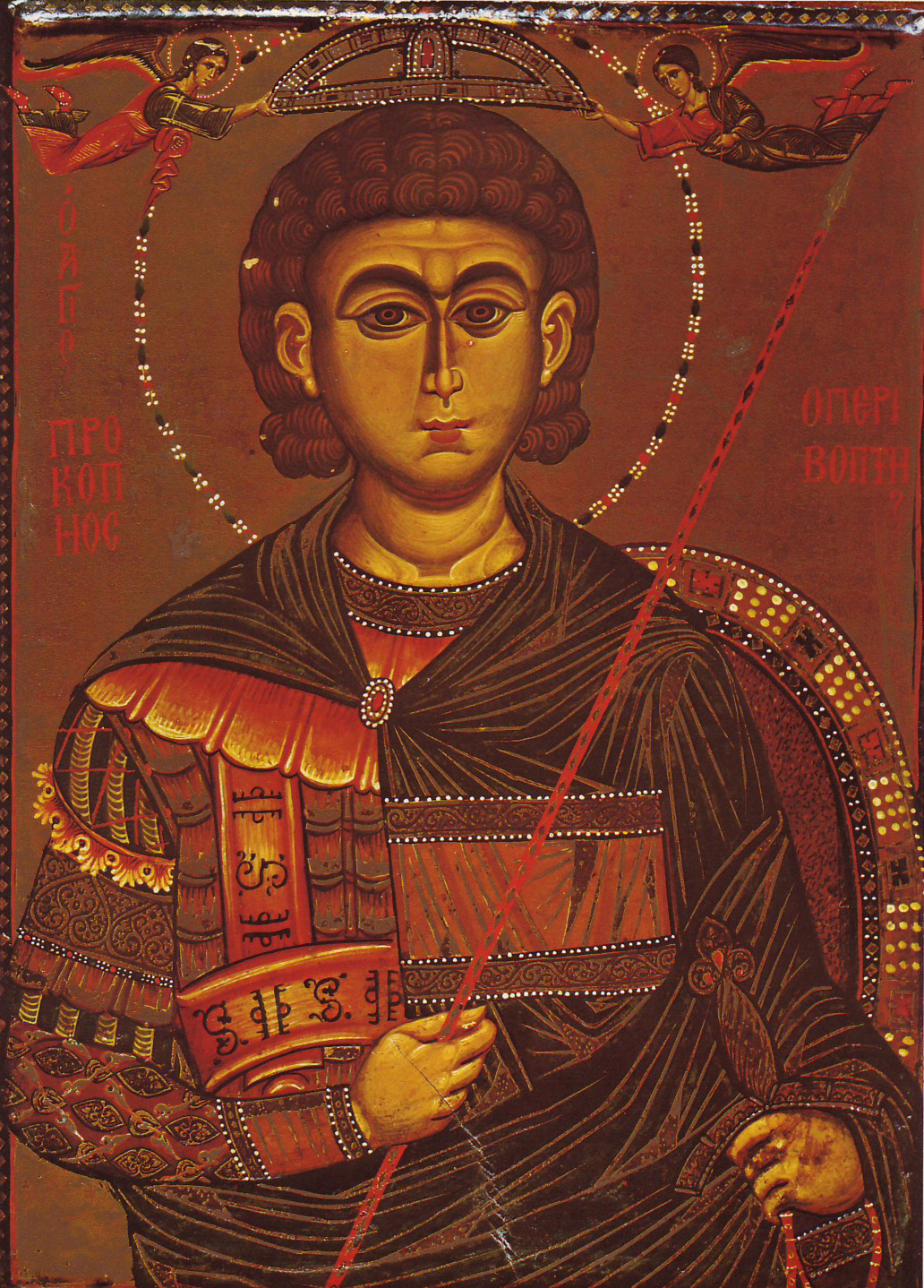
Martyr Procopius the Reader, at Caesarea in Palestine.

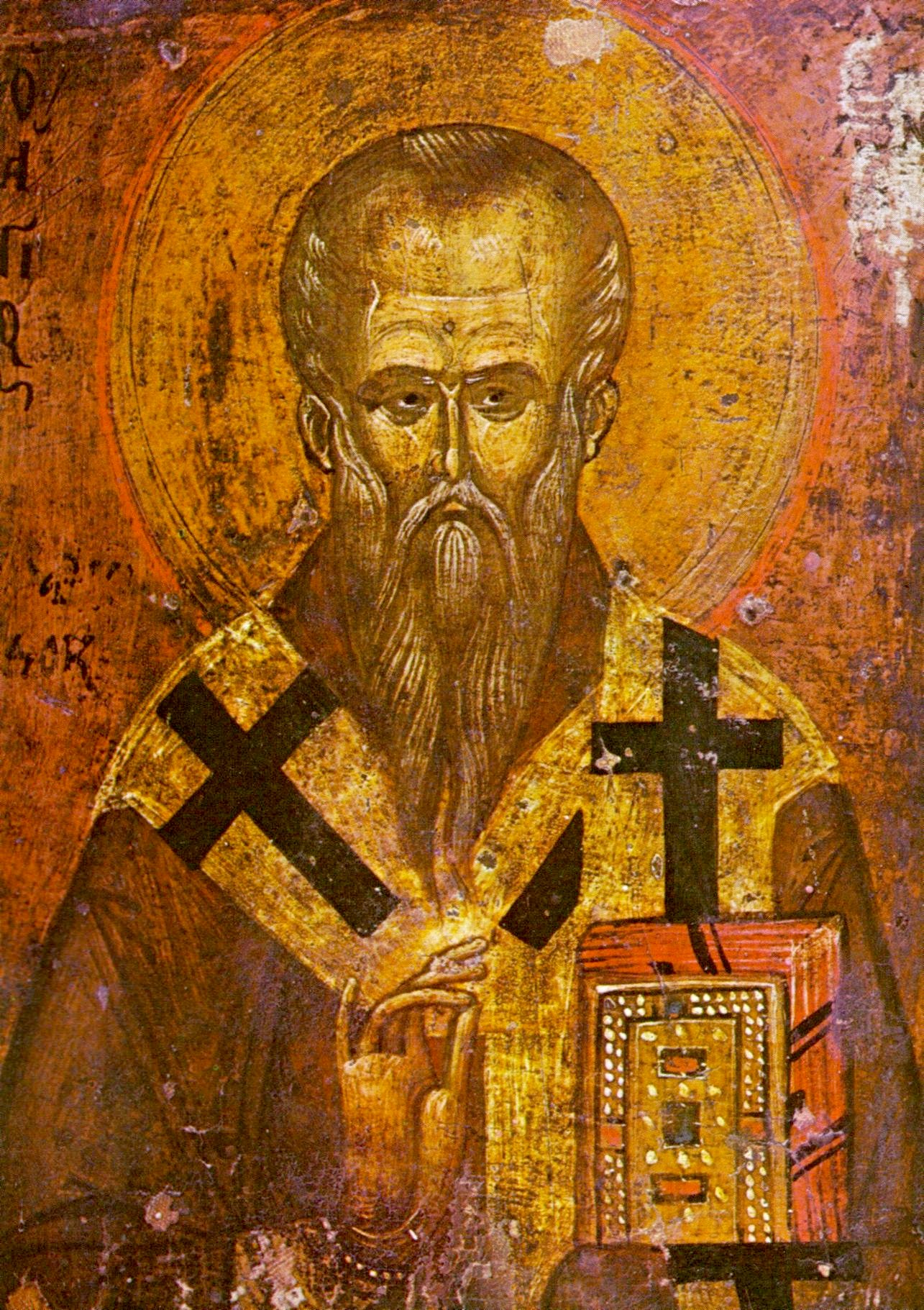
Saint Clement of Ochrid.

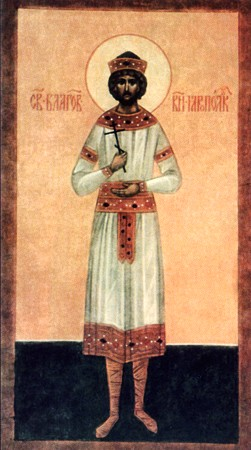
St. Yaropolk-Peter, Prince of Vladimir in Volhynia.

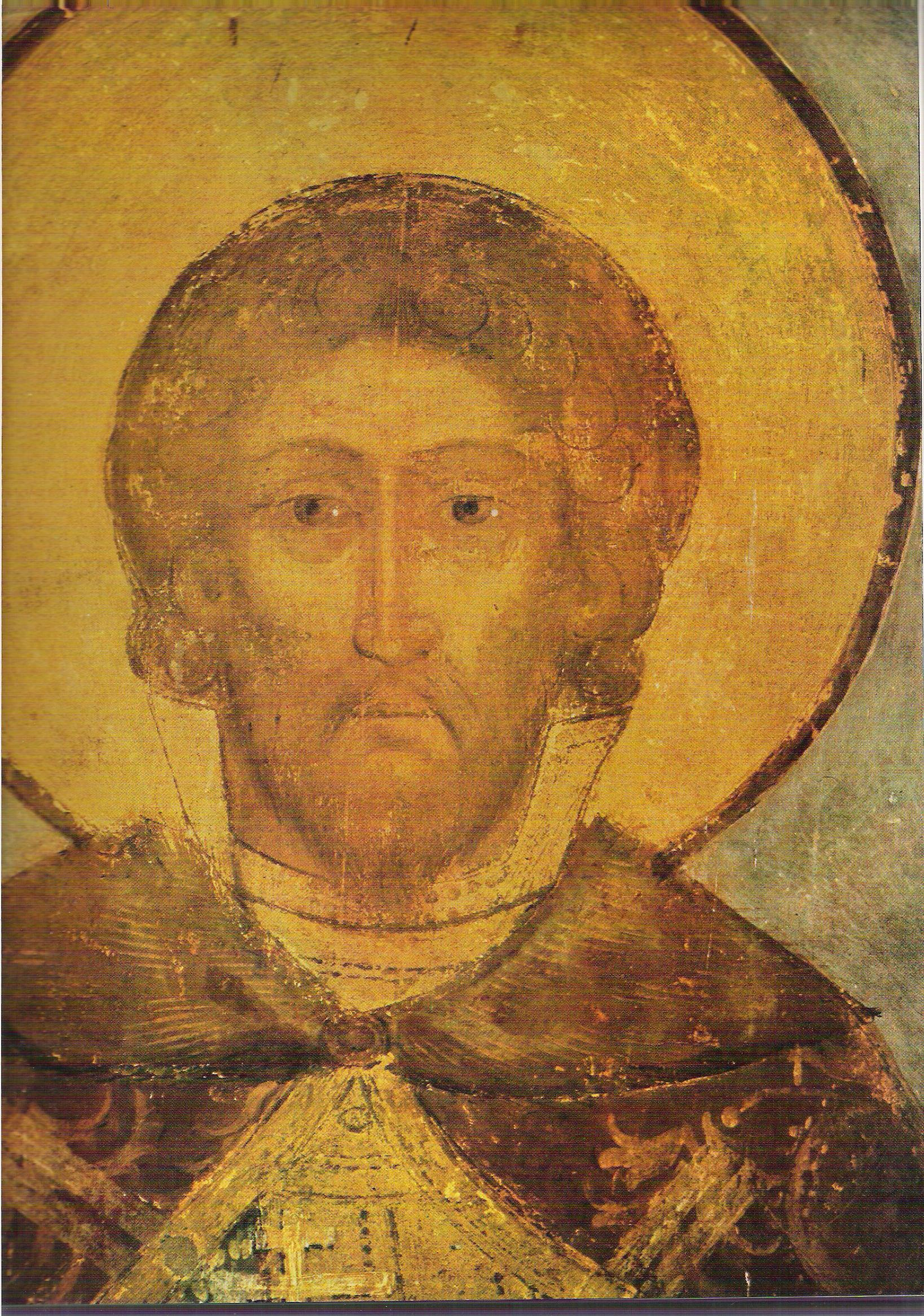
St. Michael of Tver.

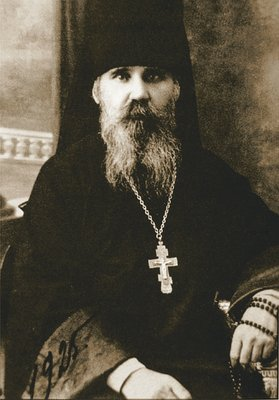
New Hieromartyr Joasaph (Zhevakhov), Bishop of Mogilev.

New Hieromartyr Alexis Benemansky, Archpriest of Tver.

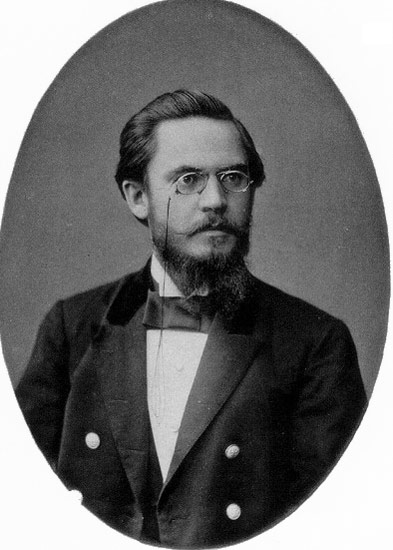
New Hieromartyr Elias Gromoglasov, Archpriest of Tver.

== Sources ==
- November 22 / December 5. Orthodox Calendar (PRAVOSLAVIE.RU).
- December 5 / November 22. Holy Trinity Russian Orthodox Church (A parish of the Patriarchate of Moscow).
- November 22. OCA - The Lives of the Saints.
- The Autonomous Orthodox Metropolia of Western Europe and the Americas (ROCOR). St. Hilarion Calendar of Saints for the year of our Lord 2004. St. Hilarion Press (Austin, TX). p. 87.
- The Twenty-Second Day of the Month of November. Orthodoxy in China.
- November 22. Latin Saints of the Orthodox Patriarchate of Rome.
- The Roman Martyrology. Transl. by the Archbishop of Baltimore. Last Edition, According to the Copy Printed at Rome in 1914. Revised Edition, with the Imprimatur of His Eminence Cardinal Gibbons. Baltimore: John Murphy Company, 1916. pp. 360–361.
- Rev. Richard Stanton. A Menology of England and Wales, or, Brief Memorials of the Ancient British and English Saints Arranged According to the Calendar, Together with the Martyrs of the 16th and 17th Centuries. London: Burns & Oates, 1892. p. 562.

Greek Sources

- Great Synaxaristes: (in Greek) 22 ΝΟΕΜΒΡΙΟΥ. ΜΕΓΑΣ ΣΥΝΑΞΑΡΙΣΤΗΣ.
- (in Greek) Συναξαριστής. 22 Νοεμβρίου. ECCLESIA.GR. (H ΕΚΚΛΗΣΙΑ ΤΗΣ ΕΛΛΑΔΟΣ).
- (in Greek) November 22. Ορθόδοξος Συναξαριστής.

Russian Sources

- (in Russian) 5 декабря (22 ноября). Православная Энциклопедия под редакцией Патриарха Московского и всея Руси Кирилла (электронная версия). (Orthodox Encyclopedia - Pravenc.ru).
- (in Russian) 22 ноября по старому стилю / 5 декабря по новому стилю. Русская Православная Церковь - Православный церковный календарь на 2018 год.
