= Malchus of Syria =

Syrian Christian 4th century monk and saint

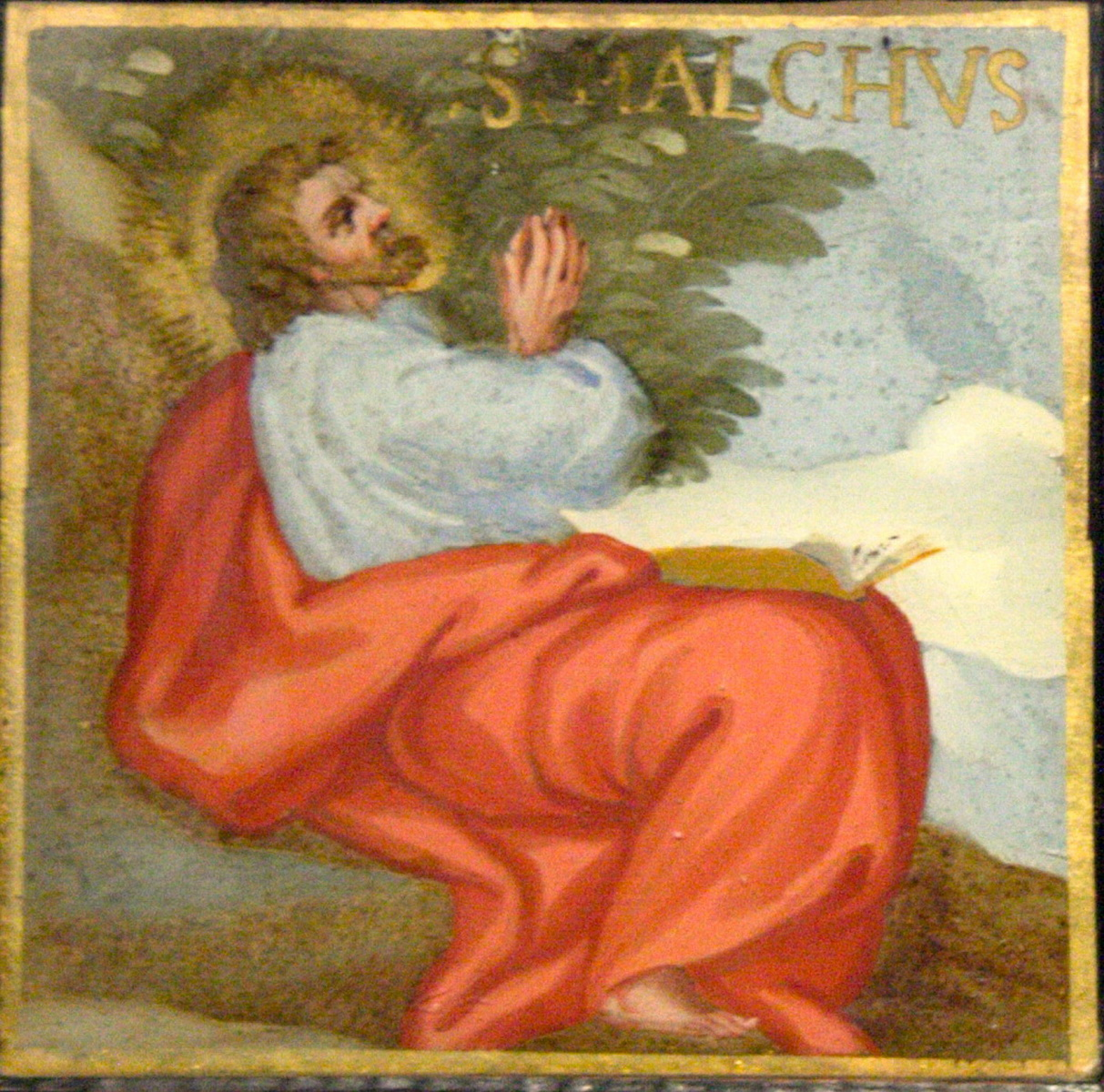
Image of Malchus from a XVII century Mallorcan furniture piece

Saint Malchus of Syria (or Malchus of Chalcis, Malchus of Maronia) (died c. 390) is the subject of Saint Jerome's biography Life of Malchus the Captive Monk (Vita Malchi monachi captivi), written in Latin around 391/392 CE.

According to Jerome, Malchus was a monk who was sold into slavery and forced to marry another slave. While never consummating the marriage, he escaped with his wife and returned to his monastery. Jerome interviewed Malchus at his home in Maronia, Syria, while Malchus and his wife were still alive. Malchus is commemorated 26 March by the Eastern Orthodox and Eastern Catholic Churches, and is in the Roman Martyrology for Oct. 21. There is no record of him except for Jerome's biographical account.

== Life ==
According to Jerome's account, Malchus was the only child of a farming family that resided near Nisibis during the fourth century. When he reached mature age Malchus' parents desired that he should marry, but he desired to become a monk. Malchus left his family home at this time and began his monastic life in the desert of Chalcis.

After several years as a monk Malchus heard of his father's death and went home to obtain his inheritance, leaving the monastery against the direction of his abbot. He joined a group of pilgrims headed to his home district, but during their journey they were overtaken by Saracens and sold into slavery.

Malchus' slave master insisted that he marry another of the slaves who had been captured in the same raid, and whose husband had been sold to another master. But Malchus, faithful to his monastic vocation refused to consummate the union and threatened to kill himself. The woman told him that she also wanted to live a celibate life, and proposed that she become the partner of his chastity, but not tell their master that they were living as brother and sister.

Malchus and his wife eventually escaped their master by fleeing downriver on inflated goatskins. When their master caught up, they hid in a cave but were tracked down. They received protection from God when a lioness using the cave for a den attacked and killed their pursuers, then left with her cub. Then they were able to ride their deceased pursuers' camels back to a Roman fort under the command of Sabinianus who allowed them to go free. (Note: Sabinianus is described as Dux Mesopotamiae, which might date Malchus' capture to the 340s or early 350s.)

Malchus sent his wife to a women's monastery as she requested, while he tried to return to his own monastery. By then the igumen was no longer alive. Malchus ended up going to Maronia, to a men's monastery under the direction of Bishop Evagrius. For the edification of monks he often recounted his trials, which were the result of his disobedience. Malchus labored in asceticism in the monastery until the end of his life. His wife also transferred to a woman's monastery in Maronia. In their old age, they became close companions again.

== See also ==
- Christian monasticism
- Eastern Christian monasticism
- Skete
- Lavra

== Bibliography ==
- Christa Gray (2015). Jerome, Vita Malchi: Introduction, Text, Translation, and Commentary. Oxford: Oxford University Press.
