= Time Gentlemen Please (album) =

Studio album by Martin Gordon
- Released: 1 September 2009
- Recorded: 2009
- Genre: Rock/alternative
- Length: 73:30
- Language: English
- Label: Radiant Future
- Producer: Martin Gordon

Martin Gordon chronology
The World is Your Lobster (2008)	Time Gentlemen Please (2009)	Include Me Out (2013)

Professional ratings
Review scores
Source	Rating
Allmusic	4/5 stars
Shindig	4/5 stars
Get Ready to Rock	4/5 stars

Time Gentlemen Please is a studio album released in 2009 by Martin Gordon on Radiant Future Records.

== Track listing ==
1. "Elephantasy"
2. "Houston We Gotta Drinking Problem"
3. "On and On"
4. "21st Century Blues"
5. "Come Out Come Out Whoever You Are"
6. "I Feel Fine"
7. "If Boys Could Talk and Girls Could Think"
8. "Talulah Does the Hula From Hawaii"
9. "Shoot the Women First"
10. "Panama"
11. "Incognito Ergo Sum"
12. "I Have a Chav"
13. "Interesting Times"
14. "Passionate About Your Elevator"
15. "I'm Budgie (Don't Fly Me)"
16. "You Can't See Me"

== Personnel ==
1. Martin Gordon/bass, keyboards, production
2. Pelle Almgren/vocals
3. Ralf Leeman/guitar, ukulele
4. Enrico Antico/guitar
5. Steve Budney/drums
