= Jet (British band) =

English glam rock band

- Origin: London, England
- Genres: Pop rock, glam rock
- Years active: 1974–1976
- Label: CBS Records
- Past members: Andy Ellison; Martin Gordon; Chris Townson; David O'List; Peter Oxendale; Ian MacLeod

Jet were an English glam rock band from London, England, formed in 1974. They released one album in 1975 before splitting up, with the bulk of the band going on to become the punk/new wave band Radio Stars.

== History ==
The band formed in 1974 with a line-up of Andy Ellison (vocals, ex-John's Children, solo artist), Martin Gordon (bass, ex-Sparks), Chris Townson (drums, formerly in John's Children), David O'List (lead guitar, ex-member of The Nice and an early member of Roxy Music) and Peter Oxendale (keyboards for a short-lived live version of Sparks). They released one eponymous album from CBS in May 1975, produced by Roy Thomas Baker. Preceding the release of the album was a brief UK tour supporting Ian Hunter & Mick Ronson. The band's debut single, "My River". was released to coincide with the tour, and was followed by a second single, "Nothing To Do With Us", which received enthusiastic review but failed to make an impact upon the charts. Dropped by CBS in 1975 due to poor sales, they split up in 1976 during sessions for a second album.

O'List and Oxendale were replaced by guitarist Ian MacLeod. Subsequent sessions at Island Studios resulted in four recordings which were rejected by Island Records but welcomed by Chiswick Records. The band changed their name to Radio Stars, and found themselves redefined by the press as a punk/new wave band.

The band briefly reformed in 2000 for a European tour, playing dates in the UK, Germany and the Netherlands, which resulted in the live album, Music for the Herd of Herring. Ellison, Gordon, Townson and Macleod were augmented for the tour by Trevor White (a former member of Sparks) and Boz Boorer (Morrissey's musical director).

Posthumous Jet releases include More Light than Shade, a collection of live cuts and demos for the band's unrecorded second album, and Some Flotsam, two live sets from their debut UK tour with Hunter-Ronson in 1975. The first officially sanctioned release of the eponymous Jet album was released in October 2010, on the UK label, RPM Records (UK), as part of a double album release (Jet/Even More Light than Shade), including previously unreleased material. Sony Music finally released the Jet album to digital service providers in 2020.

After a long period as a sideman/producer, Martin Gordon embarked on a solo career in 2001, releasing six albums in the so-called 'Mammal Trilogy', with Chris Townson playing drums, on Radiant Future Records. Gordon continues to record, his most recent solo release being in 2022 with 'Another Words - the Phone Call' which featured Donald Trump on vocals.

== Discography ==
=== Albums ===
- Jet (CBS, S-80699, May 1975)

=== Live albums ===
- Music For The Herd Of Herring (2001: Radiant Future Records RFVP001CD) - with Radio Stars & John's Children

=== Singles ===
- "My River" / "Quandary" (CBS, CBS-3143, March 1975)
- "Nothing to Do with Us" (CBS, CBS-3317, June 1975)

=== Reissues / Compilations ===
- Nothing to Do With Us - A Golden Treasury of Jet (Fan Mael, C08018)
- Jet (Radiant Future Records, RFVP002CD, 2001), re-issued by RPM Records, released digitally in 2020 by Sony Music
- More Light Than Shade (Radiant Future Records, RFVP003CD, 2001)
- More Flotsam (Radiant Future Records, RF015, 2010) - download only
- Jet / Even More Light Than Shade (RPM Records, RETRO D882, 2010)
