= John's Children =

English rock band

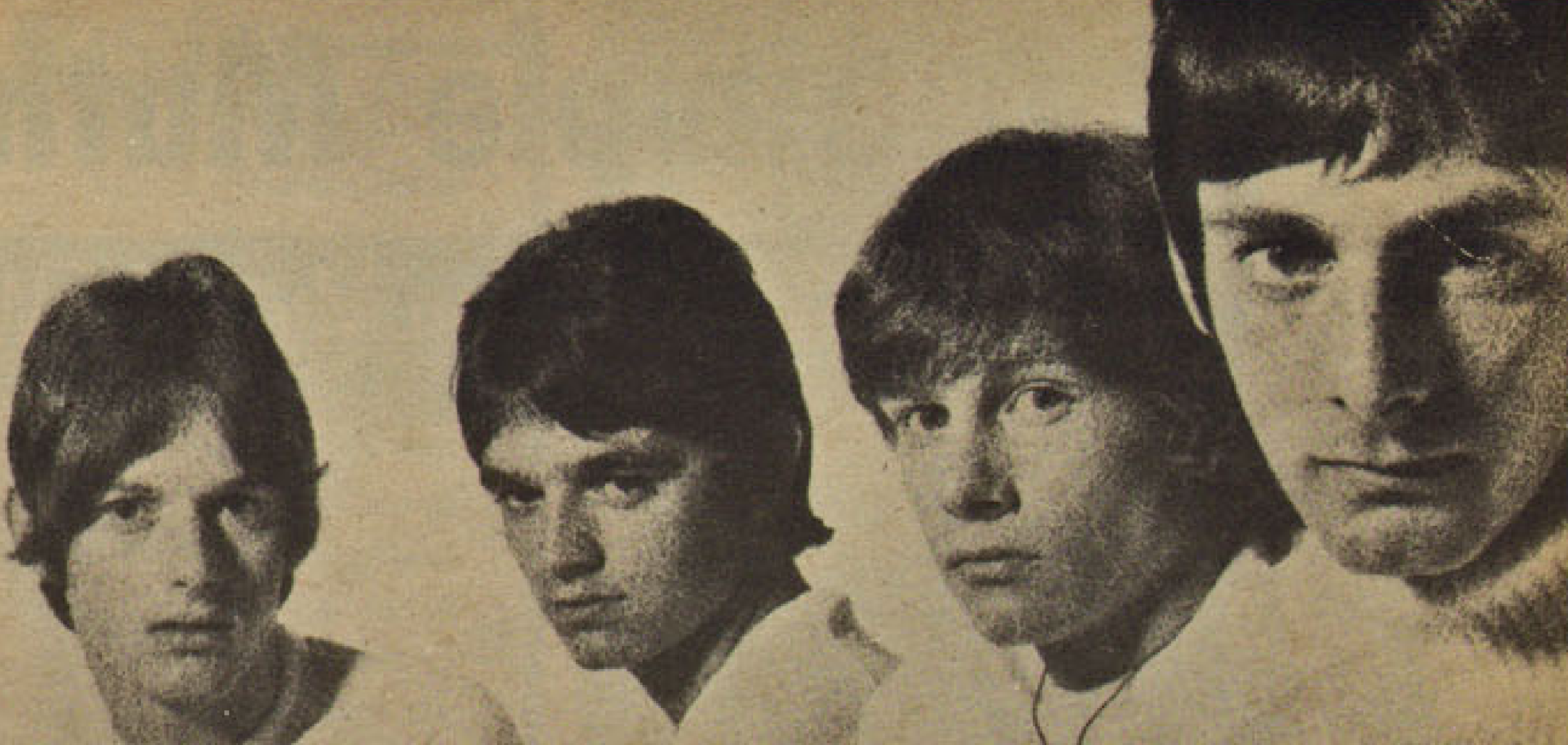
- Left to right: John Hewlett, Chris Townson, Andy Ellison, Geoff McClelland

Background information
- Origin: Leatherhead, England
- Genres: Beat; proto-punk; freakbeat
- Years active: 1966–1968; 2006–2013
- Labels: UK: Columbia (EMI), Track; USA: White Whale; Germany, Greece, Australia, Japan: Polydor; Acid Jazz (Black & White album)
- Past members: Andy Ellison; John Hewlett; Trevor White; Chris Townson; Geoff McClelland; Marc Bolan; Chris Colville; Martin Gordon (1990s); Boz Boorer (1990s)
- Website: johnschildren.co.uk

John's Children were a 1960s rock band from Leatherhead, England that briefly featured future T. Rex frontman Marc Bolan. John's Children were known for their outrageous live performances and were booted off a tour with the Who in Germany in 1967 when they upstaged the headliners. Their 1967 single "Desdemona", a Bolan composition, was banned by the BBC because of the controversial lyric, "Lift up your skirt and fly." Their US record label delayed the release of their debut album, Orgasm, for four years from its recording date due to objections from Daughters of the American Revolution.

John's Children were active for less than two years and were not very successful commercially, having released only six singles and one album, but they are seen by some as the precursors of glam rock. In retrospect the band has been praised for their impact, and their singles have become amongst the most sought-after British 1960s rock collectables.

== Biography ==
=== Inception ===
In 1965 in Great Bookham, near Leatherhead, England, drummer Chris Townson and singer Andy Ellison formed a band called the Clockwork Onions, which later became the Few, and then the Silence. The Silence consisted of Townson and Ellison, with Geoff McClelland on guitar and John Hewlett on bass guitar. While performing in France in mid-1966, Townson met the Yardbirds's manager Simon Napier-Bell and invited him to come and see the Silence. Napier-Bell described them as "positively the worst group I'd ever seen", but still agreed to manage them. He changed their name to John's Children, dressed them up in white stage outfits and encouraged them to be outrageous to attract the attention of the press. He named the band after its bass player because he played so badly and Napier-Bell wanted to be sure the band would not fire him. Townson described their live acts as "theatre", "anarchy" and "deconstruction." They fought each other on stage, used fake blood and feathers, and they trashed their instruments. In general the band "whip[ped] the audience into a frenzy." They also posed naked for the press, with flowers covering their private parts.

Napier-Bell signed John's Children to the Yardbirds's record label, Columbia Records, an EMI subsidiary, and they released their first single, "Smashed Blocked/Strange Affair" (released as "The Love I Thought I'd Found/Strange Affair" in the UK), in late 1966. Napier-Bell co-wrote "Smashed Blocked" with Hewlett, but because of his lack of confidence in the band's musical abilities, Napier-Bell used session musicians on the recording. AllMusic described the single as a "disorienting piece of musical mayhem", but said it was "one of the first overtly psychedelic singles." To Napier-Bell's surprise "Smashed Blocked/Strange Affair" broke into the bottom of the US Billboard Hot 100 and reached local top ten charts in Florida and California. In early 1967 they released their second single, "Just What You Want – Just What You'll Get/But You're Mine", which also featured session musicians, plus a guitar solo from the Yardbirds's Jeff Beck on the B-side. This one made it to the British Top 40.

The band's third single, "Not the Sort of Girl (You'd Like to Take to Bed)", was rejected outright by their UK label, which prompted the band to switch to Track Records, publishers of artists like the Jimi Hendrix Experience and the Who. In the meantime, their US label, White Whale Records, asked for an album, and Napier-Bell and the group obliged, producing Orgasm. This was a fake live album they recorded in the studio with overdubbed screams taken from the Beatles' A Hard Day's Night soundtrack. It was Napier-Bell's idea to give the album a "live" feel to make it seem like the band was very popular in England. But White Whale rejected Orgasm because of its title and pressure from Daughters of the American Revolution. The label did, however, release it four years later, in 1971.

In March 1967 Napier-Bell replaced guitarist McClelland with Marc Bolan, another of his clients. Napier-Bell had Bolan, an acoustic guitarist, play electric guitar, and take on the role of the band's singer/songwriter. Bolan composed and sang on the band's next single, "Desdemona", which was banned by the BBC because of the controversial lyric, "Lift up your skirt and fly." He also featured on several unreleased songs and BBC radio sessions, and contributed to the band's antics by whipping the stage with a chain.

=== The Who ===
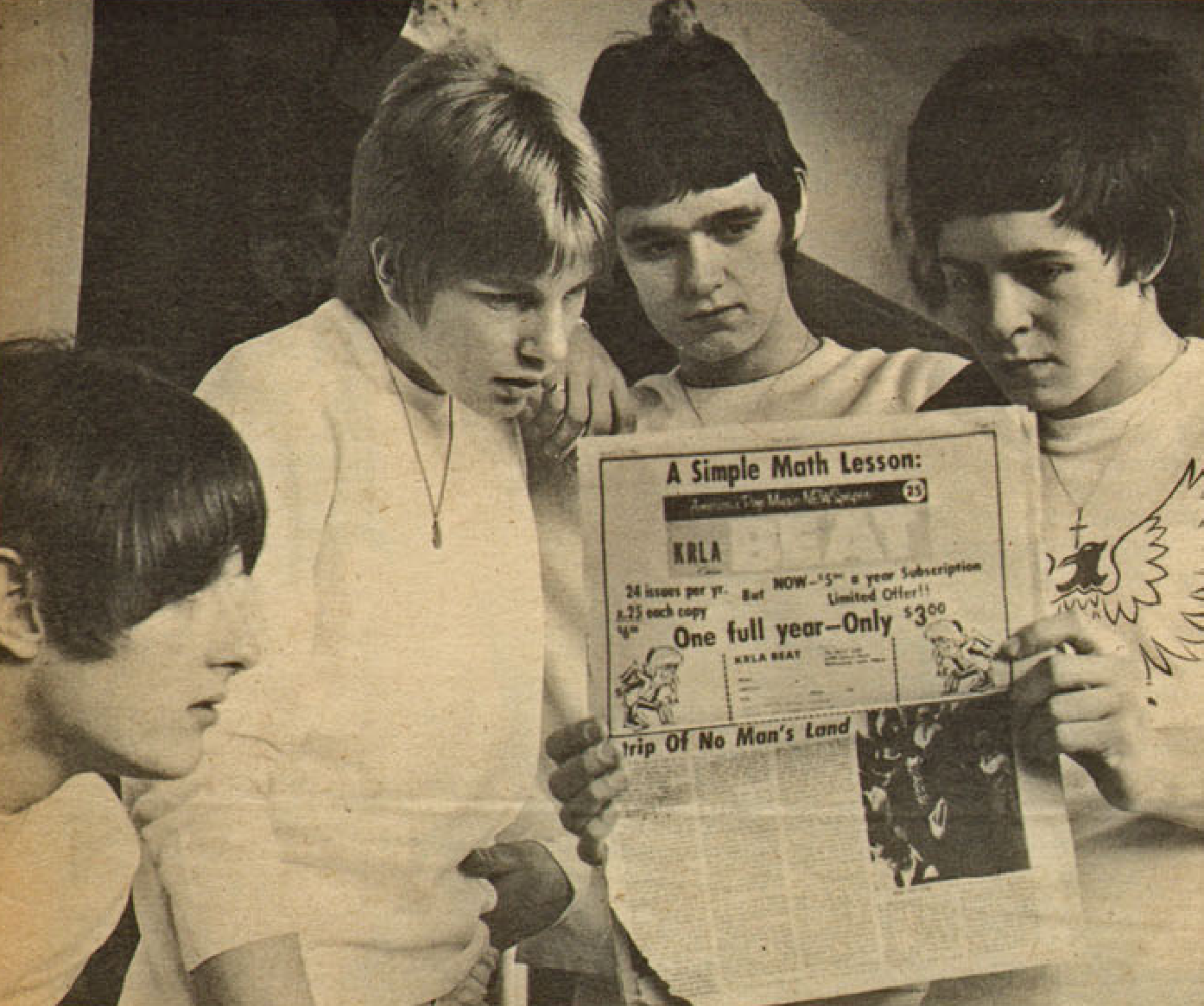
John's Children in 1967, reading an issue of KRLA Beat. Left to right: Hewlett, Ellison, Townson, Bolan

In April 1967 Napier-Bell arranged for John's Children to tour Germany with one of Britain's premier rock groups, the Who, as the latter's supporting act. The Who were notorious for their own wild stage performances, which included smashing their instruments. John's Children pulled out all the stops and upstaged the Who with performances that included Bolan whipping his guitar with a chain, Townson attacking his drums, Ellison and Hewlett pretending to fight each other, and Ellison ripping open pillows and diving into the audience. In Düsseldorf they caused a riot at the venue, and in Ludwigshafen they nearly prevented the Who from playing. The Who were not happy and John's Children were sent home mid-tour. According to Pete Townshend, they were "too loud and violent."

Notwithstanding John's Children's antics in Germany, Townson was later asked to replace Keith Moon on drums near the end of the Who's UK tour in June that year after Moon had injured himself demolishing his drum kit on stage. With no time for rehearsal, Townson performed with the Who for five days, and did it so well, "most of the audience didn't realise it wasn't Keith." But the Who got their revenge on Townson for John's Children's "reckless behaviour" on the German tour: at the end of his last gig with them, they "blew [him] off the stage" with flash powder.

=== Breakup and legacy ===
John's Children played at The 14 Hour Technicolor Dream concert at the Alexandra Palace in London on 29 April 1967. Bolan left in June 1967, after four months with the band, following disagreements with the way Napier-Bell was producing the band's next single, "A Midsummer Night's Scene". The single was never released, but in its place the B-side of "Desdemona", "Remember Thomas à Becket", was re-recorded with new lyrics and released as "Come and Play with Me in the Garden". Bolan went on to form folk duo Tyrannosaurus Rex (later glam rock band T. Rex).

After Bolan left, Townson switched to guitar and former roadie Chris Colville took over on drums. John's Children recorded another single, "Go Go Girl", a Bolan composition he later recorded with Tyrannosaurus Rex as "Mustang Ford". John's Children also performed Bolan's "Mustang Ford" version of the song. The band released one more single, "It's Been a Long Time" (issued as an Andy Ellison solo single), and then embarked on a "disastrous" tour of Germany. Their last performance was at the Star-Club in Hamburg, Germany (substituting for the Bee Gees), after which they split up in 1968.

Ellison went on to make several solo singles before resurfacing in Jet in 1974, along with drummer Chris Townson. Jet metamorphosed into Radio Stars in the mid-Seventies.

John Hewlett managed the band Sparks — themselves admirers of John's Children — in the mid-1970s.

John's Children re-formed in the mid-1990s with Boz Boorer on guitar and former Sparks and Radio Stars member Martin Gordon on bass, performing gigs for the New Untouchables in the UK, Italy, Spain and the US. In 1999, Ellison, Townson and Gordon were joined by guitarists Trevor White (another former member of Sparks) and Ian Macleod (another member of Radio Stars) to perform a selection of John's Children, Jet and Radio Stars repertoire, released as Music for the Herd of Herring and recorded in the UK, the Netherlands and Germany.

With Gordon and Boorer, John's Children performed at the Steve Marriott Memorial Event at the London Astoria on 20 April 2001. Ellison, Hewlett and Townson plus guitarist Trevor White officially re-formed John's Children in June 2006 and performed and recorded occasionally until 2013. Townson died in February 2008.

Several compilation albums of John's Children's music have been issued retrospectively, some of which include previously unreleased material. An account of Napier-Bell's time with John's Children and Bolan is given in his 1982 book You Don't Have To Say You Love Me.

== Reception and influence ==
Music critic Richie Unterberger at AllMusic described John's Children as an "interesting, if minor, blip on the British mod and psychedelic scene", but added that because they were better known for their "flamboyant image and antics" rather than the music they made, they "are perhaps accorded more reverence by '60s collectors and aficionados than they deserve." In a Chris Townson obituary published in The Independent in February 2008, Pierre Perrone wrote that John's Children's live performances had "raw energy and power chords worthy of the Who." Perfect Sound Forever columnist Richard Mason said that John's Children "made a fine upstanding racket. Guitars and drums are thrashed within an inch of their lives; vocals are intoned with, one might hazard a guess, a grin on the face of the protagonist." Their lyrics were "generally disrespectful and crazed" and their music was "eccentric, loud, irreverent and to the point." Mason believes that musically the band was not as bad as generally perceived: "They sound as if they can actually play but would rather enjoy themselves, which is no mean feat." He said that they came from an era that is "for the most part misunderstood, either cloyingly romanticised or short-sightedly vilified", and today the story of John's Children is "relegated to a condescending historical footnote."

AllMusic called them "pre-glam rockers of sorts", and The Illustrated New Musical Express Encyclopedia of Rock said that John's Children "have claims to being [the] first-ever glam rock band." Notwithstanding their brief tenure in the spotlight, the group went on to achieve a cult following that persists today. Their handful of singles have become amongst the most sought-after British 1960s rock collectables. A copy of their unreleased single, "A Midsummer Night's Scene", was auctioned in 2002 for £3,700.

In his history of glam rock, Simon Reynolds commented on John's Children's distinctive sound, writing that on songs such as "Jagged Time Lapse", "Remember Thomas à Beckett" and "Midsummer Night's Scenes", "there's barely anything you could call a proper chord, let alone a riff; just spasms of distortion, staccato jolts, drum-roll gear shifts, swathes of sustained feedback that appear and disappear without good reason, blissed-out moans and gasps." Reviewing the compilation Nuggets II (2001) for Uncut, he wrote that the band's lack of success remains a mystery, describing "Desdemona" and "A Midnight Summer's Scenes" as "astoundingly deranged, the monstrously engorged fuzzbass like staring into a furnace, the drums flailing and scything like Keith Moon at his most smashed-blocked." He wrote that the group's "merger of cissy and psychotic highlights the major difference between US garage punk and British 'freakbeat'".

== Line-up ==
- Andy Ellison: vocals (b. 5 July 1945, Finchley, North London)
- Geoff McClelland: guitar (b. 1947)
- Marc Bolan: guitar (replaced McClelland, March 1967)
- John Hewlett: bass guitar (b. 1948)
- Chris Townson: drums/guitar (b. 24 July 1947, Battersea, South West London – d. 10 February 2008)
- Chris Colville: drums (only at live appearances)

=== Black & White album ===
The 2011 album Black & White features the following line-up:

- Andy Ellison
- Chris Townson
- Boz Boorer
- Martin Gordon

== Discography ==
=== Albums ===
- Orgasm (White Whale, September 1970, projected release: 18 March 1967)
- Legendary Orgasm Album (re-issue of faux "live" album plus A- and B-sides of first two singles; "Strange Affair" is a unique backwards mix) (Cherry Red, 1981)
- Music for the Herd of Herring – (John's Children/Jet/Radio Stars) (Radiant Future Records, REVP001CD, 2001)
- Black & White (Acid Jazz, AJXCD 234, 6 June 2011)

=== Compilations ===
- A Midsummer Night's Scene – 1988, Bam Caruso (MARI 095 CD)
- Smashed Blocked! – 1997, NMC (Pilot 12)
- Jagged Time Lapse – 1997, NMC (Pilot 18)
- John's Children (EP) – 1999, Trash (LARD 20 07 99)
- The Complete John's Children – 2002, NMC (Pilot 118) / reissued in 2005 by Voiceprint (VP365CD)
- A Strange Affair (The Sixties Recordings) – 2014 Grapefruit Records (CRSEG027D)

=== Singles ===
- "Smashed Blocked" (Napier-Bell/Hewlett) / "Strange Affair"
  - (UK A-side title: "The Love I Thought I'd Found"; Germany B-side: "Just What You Want..." USA: Billboard Hot 100 and local (Florida) Top-10s; backing by L.A. session musicians) (UK: Columbia (EMI) DB 8030, 14 October 1966, USA: White Whale, December 1966, Germany: Polydor 59069, 1967)
- "Just What You Want – Just What You'll Get" (Hewlett, Townson, Ellison, McClelland) / "But She's Mine"
  - (A-side: backing by English session musicians; Jeff Beck guests on B-side) (UK: Columbia (EMI) DB 8124, 3 February 1967)
- "Desdemona" (Bolan) / "Remember Thomas à Becket"
  - (Bolan on A-side, McClelland on B-side) (UK: Track 604 003, 24 May 1967; Germany: Polydor 59 104)
- "Midsummer Night's Scene" (Bolan) / "Sara Crazy Child" (full length) (Bolan) (release cancelled)
  - (UK: Track 604 005, June 1967)
- "Come and Play with Me in the Garden" (Ellison, Hewlett)/ "Sara Crazy Child" (edited) (Bolan)
  - (Bolan plays on B-side only) (UK: Track 604 005, 14 July 1967; Germany: Polydor 59 116)
- "Go Go Girl" (Bolan)/ "Jagged Time Lapse" (Hewlett, McClelland)
  - (A-side is version of Bolan's "Mustang Ford" and features Bolan on guitar, B-side from remaining recordings with Geoff McClelland) (UK: Track 604 010, 6 October 1967; Germany: Polydor 59 160; Greece: International Polydor 244)
- "It's Been a Long Time" / "Arthur Green" (B-side only, Andy Ellison solo single)
  - (UK: Track 604 018, December 1967)

=== Other releases ===
- Incredible Sound Show Stories Vol.5 – Yellow Street Boutique
  - (Sampler featuring songs recorded by the Silence)
