= Submarine Tracks & Fool's Gold =

Submarine Tracks & Fool's Gold (Chiswick Chartbusters Volume One)

Compilation album by Various
- Released: 1977
- Genre: Power pop, pub rock, punk rock, new wave
- Label: Chiswick Records (Cat. No. CH 2)

Submarine Tracks & Fool's Gold is a compilation album of various artists made up of acts on Chiswick Records.

The critic and author Dave Thompson describes Submarine Tracks & Fool's Gold as a "driving" collection, rating it "eight out of ten". The album also receives a good review on the Allmusic website.

The album was followed up with the Long Shots, Dead Certs And Odds On Favourites (Chiswick Chartbusters Volume Two) compilation album in 1978.

== Original track listing ==
=== Side one ===
1. "The Keys To Your Heart" (3:36) by The 101ers
2. "The Teenage Letter" (2:20) by The Count Bishops
3. "The She's My Gal" (2:45) by The Gorillas
4. "I'm Crying" (3:08) by Little Bob Story
5. "The Train Train" (3:15) by The Count Bishops
6. "The Gorilla Got Me" (3:07) by The Gorillas

=== Side two ===
1. "Dirty Pictures" (2:50) by Radio Stars
2. "The Gatecrasher" (2:55) by The Gorillas
3. "Drip Drop" (2:14) by Rocky Sharpe & The Razors
4. "Baby Don't Cry" (3:20) by Little Bob Story
5. "The Route 66" (2:52) by The Count Bishops,
6. "So Hard To Laugh" (2:24) by Rocky Sharpe & The Razors
