= Orgasm (John's Children album) =

Studio album by John's Children
- Released: September 1970
- Recorded: 1966
- Studio: Advision Studios
- Genre: Psychedelic rock, psychedelic pop, freakbeat
- Length: 39:46
- Label: White Whale WWS-7128 (USA); SWWL-933978 (Aus)
- Producer: Simon Napier-Bell

Professional ratings
Review scores
Source	Rating
Allmusic	3/5 stars

Orgasm is the only studio album by the English band John's Children, projected for release on 18 March 1967, and eventually released in September 1970. It was recorded (before Marc Bolan joined the band) at Advison Studios in London, England. Originally intended as a regular studio album, it was transformed into a fake "live" album by producer Simon Napier-Bell by dubbing audience screams lifted from the Beatles' film A Hard Day's Night (1964).

According to the liner notes by Chris Donovan in the 1982 Cherry Red Records reissue of the album, its release in the United States was stopped by the Daughters of the American Revolution, who objected to the title. When the album was finally released by White Whale in the U.S., the title "Orgasm" was covered up on the front cover and on the disc label. However, the title was forgotten to be removed from the LP spine, where it remained.

In Australia it was released as simply John's Children.

== Track listing ==
=== 1970, White Whale, US WWS-7128 / Australia SWWL 933978 ===
Side 1

1. "Killer Ben" – (Hewlett, Ellison)
2. "Jagged Time Lapse" – (McClelland, Hewlett)
3. "Smashed Blocked" – (Napier-Bell, Hewlett)
4. "You're a Nothing" – (Hewlett, McClelland, Ellison, Townson)
5. "Not the Sort of Girl" – (Hewlett, Ellison)

Side 2

1. "Cold on Me" – (Hewlett, Ellison)
2. "Leave Me Alone" – (Hewlett, Ellison)
3. "Let Me Know" – (Hewlett, Ellison)
4. "Just What You Want – Just What You'll Get" – (Hewlett, McClelland, Ellison, Townson)
5. "Why Do You Lie" – (Hewlett, McClelland, Ellison, Townson)

=== 1982, Cherry Red, B RED 31 (vinyl) / 1988, Cherry Red, CDM RED 31 (CD) ===
1. "Smashed Blocked" (Studio) – 2:57
2. "Just What You Want – Just What You'll Get" (Studio) – 2:57
3. "Killer Ben" – 2:29
4. "Jagged Time Lapse" – 3:13
5. "Smashed Blocked" (Live) – 3:20
6. "You're a Nothing" – 3:36
7. "Not the Sort of Girl" – 2:05
8. "Cold on Me" – 2:51
9. "Leave Me Alone" – 3:12
10. "Let Me Know" – 3:27
11. "Just What You Want – Just What You'll Get" (Live) – 3:40
12. "Why Do You Lie" – 5:00
13. "Strange Affair" (Napier-Bell, Ellison) – 1:59
14. "But She's Mine" (Ellison, Townsend, McClelland, Hewlett) – 2:01
- The 'live' versions of "Just What You Want – Just What You'll Get" and "Smashed Blocked" are the original overdubbed versions and not actual live recordings.
- "Strange Affair" is played backwards. No explanation is provided for this.

An enhanced reissue of the album was released in 2000 by Cherry Red (CDMRED 177) that included a much expanded fold-out booklet and the rare promotional video for Smashed Blocked.

== Personnel ==
- Andy Ellison - vocals, maracas
- Geoff McClelland - guitar
- John Hewlett - bass guitar
- Chris Townson - drums

with:

- Jeff Beck - guitar on "But She's Mine"

Technical

- Gerald Chevin - engineer
