= Orgasm (disambiguation) =

Orgasm is the third stage in the sexual response cycle.

Orgasm or Orgasmic may also refer to:

- Orgasm (cocktail)

== Music ==
- Orgasmic (producer) (born 1978), French DJ and record producer
- Orgasm (Alan Shorter album) or the title song, 1969
- Orgasm (Cromagnon album), 1969
- Orgasm (John's Children album), 1970
- Orgasm, an album by Atrox, 2003
- "Orgasm" (song), by X Japan, 1986
- "Orgasm", a song by Prince from Come, 1994
