= Include Me Out =

Studio album by Martin Gordon
- Released: 1 April 2013
- Recorded: 2013
- Genre: Rock/alternative
- Length: 37.42
- Language: English
- Label: Radiant Future
- Producer: Martin Gordon

Martin Gordon chronology
Time Gentlemen Please (2009)	Include Me Out (2013)	Gilbert Gordon & Sullivan (2016)

Include Me Out is a studio album released in 2013 by Martin Gordon on Radiant Future Records.

== Track listing ==
1. "Gotta Go Green"
2. "If English Is Good Enough For Jesus"
3. "Stanley Green"
4. "No Greater Dictator"
5. "Nobody Went to the Moon"
6. "Call Me Anne"
7. "Still Not Lovin'"
8. "User Generated"
9. "Include Me Out"
10. "Bang Your Head"
11. "Girls From the Country"
12. "Why Wake Up"

== Personnel ==
1. Martin Gordon/bass guitar, double bass, keyboards, production
2. Pelle Almgren/vocals
3. Ralf Leeman/guitar, ukulele
4. Enrico Antico/guitar
5. Romain Vicente/drums
