= Parkside School, Cobham =

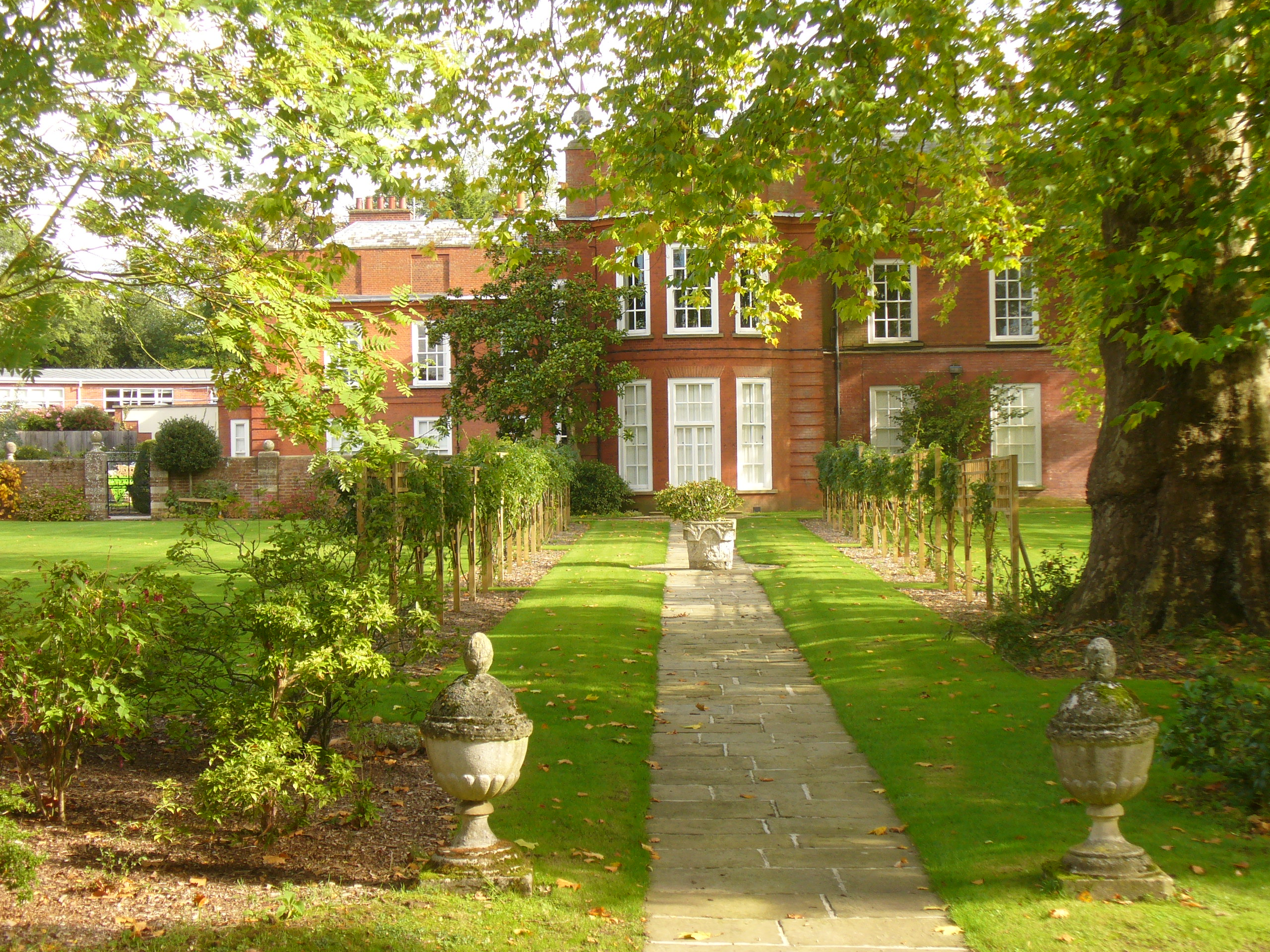

Location
- Cobham, Surrey, England
- Coordinates: 51.3141°N 0.38225°W

Information
- Type: private preparatory school
- Website: www.parkside-school.co.uk

Parkside School is a private preparatory school located in Cobham. Founded in 1879, the school caters for pupils aged 2 to 13.

== History ==
Originally established in 1879 in East Horsely, Parkside moved to its current location on the banks of the River Mole in Stoke D'Abernon, Elmbridge in 1979. The school occupies 45 acres of land and contains a number of historic buildings.

It is situated in between Chelsea Football Club's training ground and the Yehudi Menuhin School and shares the site with St Mary's Church, an Anglican parish church located adjacent to Parkside School in Stoke D’Abernon, Surrey, England.

== Buildings ==
=== The Manor ===
The main building of the school is a Grade II* listed manor building, originally Elizabethan and then significantly modified in the Georgian era.

=== Notable alumni ===
Notable alumni include Darryl Read, who was a British musician, actor and writer. In the late 1960s, Read was a member of Crushed Butler, considered by some to be amongst the forerunners of proto-punk and punk rock.

Also attending the school were Alexander Buller-Turner, Victor Buller-Turner and Thomas Orde Lawder Wilkinson, each of whom were awarded the Victoria Cross.

Another former pupil, Stephen Lander, served as Director General of MI5 from 1996 to 2002. More recently, radio broadcaster Toby Tarrant and professional tennis players Alastair Gray and Jack Draper have attended the school.
