= Desdemona (John's Children song) =

- German picture sleeve

Single by John's Children
- A-side: "Desdemona"
- B-side: "Remember Thomas A. Becket"
- Released: UK: 24 May 1967
- Genre: Psychedelic pop
- Length: 2:27
- Label: UK: Track 604003; Germany: Polydor 59116
- Songwriter(s): Marc Bolan
- Producer(s): Simon Napier-Bell

John's Children singles chronology
"Just What You Want - Just What You'll Get" (1967)	"Desdemona" (1967)	"Midsummer Night's Scene" (1967)

"Desdemona" is a song by the English cult band John's Children. The song was composed by Marc Bolan, who at the time was a member of John's Children.

It was released in 1967 and failed to chart in Britain, possibly due to the fact it was banned by the BBC for the controversial lyric "lift up your skirt and fly." However, the song was a minor hit in Europe.

It was also recorded by the band Fresh, on their album, "Fresh Today" (RCA LSP-4427), in 1970. This revision was co-produced by John's Children producer Simon Napier-Bell and Ray Singer, who provided vocals.

It was later covered by Radio Stars (featuring former John's Children singer Andy Ellison) (1978) and Marsha Hunt (1969), with The Jam additionally known to have played the song live.
