= Chris Townson =

English musician, illustrator and social worker

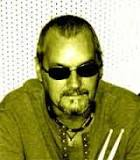
- Chris Townson, Berlin 2007

Background information
- Born: 24 July 1947; London, England
- Died: 10 February 2008 (aged 60) London, England
- Genres: Rock
- Occupations: Musician, illustrator, social worker
- Instrument: Drums
- Years active: 1965–2006

Chris Townson (24 July 1947 – 10 February 2008) was an English musician, illustrator and social worker. He was a founding member of the 1960s rock group John's Children, and a member of several other bands, including Jook, Jet and Radio Stars. He replaced The Who's Keith Moon on drums on a 1967 UK tour after Moon had injured himself, and he jammed with Jimi Hendrix at the Speakeasy rock club in London. Later in his life Townson quit the music business and became an illustrator and a highly respected social worker.

== Early life ==
Chris Townson was born in Battersea, London on 24 July 1947. He was abandoned by his parents at the age of four, and spent his early childhood in foster care. In 1958, after passing the entrance exam, the London County Council sent Townson to the Stoatley Rough School in Haslemere, Surrey, where he was resident for two years. In the early 1960s, Townson attended Box Hill School, also in Surrey, and there he met Andy Ellison.

== John's Children ==
In 1965 Townson and Ellison formed a band called the Clockwork Onions, which later became The Few, and then The Silence. The band was Townson (drums), Ellison (vocals), Geoff McClelland (guitar) and John Hewlett (bass guitar). Townson invited The Yardbirds' manager Simon Napier-Bell to see The Silence perform, and while Napier-Bell thought they were "dreadful", he was impressed by their antics and agreed to manage them. He changed the group's name to John's Children and said they should make their act "as outrageous as possible" to attract the attention of the press. The band was named after their bass player because he played so badly and Napier-Bell wanted to be sure the band would not fire him. In March 1967 Marc Bolan joined John's Children and Napier-Bell signed them with Track Records, which included artists like The Who and The Jimi Hendrix Experience. John's Children released several singles, including "Desdemona", which was banned by the BBC because of its lyrics. Their live act, according to Townson, was "theatre", "anarchy" and "deconstruction". They fought each other on stage, used chains, fake blood and feathers, and they trashed their instruments. In general the band "whip[ped] the audience into a frenzy".

In April 1967 John's Children went on a tour of Germany with The Who, also notorious for their own wild stage performances. But John's Children were sent home early because they "upstaged" The Who, and their act in Ludwigshafen caused a riot in the audience, which nearly prevented The Who from playing. A few months later, however, The Who called on Townson's services when their drummer Keith Moon had injured himself demolishing his own drum kit on stage. Townson drummed with The Who, his "all time favourite band", in four of their concerts in June 1967. But The Who got their revenge on Townson for John's Children's "reckless behaviour" on the German tour: at the end of his last gig with them, they "blew [him] off the stage" with flash powder.

John's Children split up in late 1967 after only 18 months, but in that short period of time they had achieved a "cult status".

== Later life ==
Townson played in several groups after John's Children, including Jook, Jet and Radio Stars. In the late 1970s Townson quit the music business and built a successful career illustrating album covers and books. Later, and for health reasons, he studied to be a social worker, and worked with the National Children's Home, becoming director of its Phoenix Project. It was Townson's own difficult childhood and the help he had received from social workers at the time that gave him an "innate understanding" of the children's circumstances.

Townson rejoined John's Children when they reformed in the late 1990s for the occasional tour, and recorded a single with them in 2006. He also played on all of (former Jet member) Martin Gordon's solo albums, and also illustrated a book which accompanied one of them, entitled The Illustrated and Annotated 'God's on His Lunchbreak, Please Call Back' Companion Volume.

== Death ==
Townson died of cancer in London on 10 February 2008. He was married twice and fathered four daughters and a son.

== Influences ==
Notwithstanding the Beatlemania that was sweeping the country at the time, Townson and Ellison were more interested in the rhythm and blues sound of The Rolling Stones, The Yardbirds and The Who. When Townson saw The Who perform, he said in a magazine interview some years later, "that was it, it was this that I wanted to do!"
