= Willie Egan =

- Also known as: Willie Egans, Willie Eggins, Robert "Willie" Egan
- Born: Robert Lee Egan; October 1, 1933; Near Minden, Louisiana, United States
- Died: August 5, 2004 (aged 70) Inglewood, California, United States
- Genres: Rhythm and blues, boogie-woogie
- Occupations: Pianist, singer, songwriter
- Instruments: Piano, vocals
- Years active: 1949–early 1990s
- Label: Various

Willie Egan (October 1, 1933 – August 5, 2004) was an American rhythm and blues and boogie-woogie pianist, singer, and songwriter. He recorded a string of singles in the mid- to late-1950s, using his "boogie-woogie-tinged R&B" styling to critical, but no real commercial, success. Egan wrote most of his own material, and enjoyed a resurgence of interest in Europe in the early 1980s. Pop historians tend to concur that his lack of tangible success in the 1950s, was down to a combination of lack of national promotion, scarce airplay and poor management. A continual mis-spelling of his own name was a further distraction; even his best remembered track, "Wear Your Black Dress", appeared on a single's B-side.

== Life and career ==
Robert Lee Egan was born near to Minden, Louisiana, United States. His family's bayou home was separated from the main road by swamp, the travails of which claimed Egan's father's hand and his brother's foot to the perils of ever-present alligators en route. Egan escaped the daily perils and abject poverty at the age of nine, when his family had him relocate to live with his grandmother in Los Angeles, His uncle's front porch piano proved irresistible, and Egan was helped when a neighbor taught Egan the rudiments of playing in a boogie-woogie manner, by penciling numbers onto the piano's keys. Egan was influenced by Amos Milburn, Hadda Brooks, Camille Howard, Nellie Lutcher, and Little Willie Littlefield. He became proficient enough on the instrument that by 1949, at the age of 15, Egan signed to Elko Records and they issued his debut single, "It's A Shame", billed as Little Willie Egan. It generated little notice and Egan returned to performing in local clubs, before a short-lived pairing with the guitarist Lloyd Rowe, saw the release of "Don't Know Where She Went" (1955) on Mambo Records.

His recording career gained momentum as firstly Mambo Records, and then Vita Records, issued a small string of singles over the next few months. These included "Come On", billed to Willie Egans and Orchestra, before a reworking of his debut side, "It's A Shame", appeared as "What A Shame", although the accreditation by then showed Willie Eggins and Orchestra. "Sometimes I Wonder" and 1956's "I Can't Understand It", were follow-up releases, although the latter's jump blues B-side, "Wear Your Black Dress", was deemed to be Egan's stand-out offering. The song was inspired by a tale relating to Egan's wife. He noted "'Wear Your Black Dress' came about because I almost shot her, I was sitting at home with a .38 in my lap, waiting for her to come home". Two records on Vita Records, "She's Gone Away, But," and "Treat Me Right", were followed by his final solo effort, "Rock and Roll Fever," in 1958; where his only release on the tiny Dash Records label, at least saw his name spelt correctly. Conversely, poor distribution and scarce airplay, coupled with lack of managerial expertise kept him from flourishing outside of small local markets.

His next venture was to team up with Marvin Phillips, to become the final 'Johnny' in the long-running duo act, Marvin & Johnny. They released three underwhelming singles between 1958 and 1962, before parting company. Returning to a spluttering solo career, Egan's loss of equipment in a nightclub blaze, saw him give up performing and return to Los Angeles to work as a hospital orderly. For many in his circumstances that might have been the end of the story, but unexpected help from across the Atlantic Ocean emerged almost two decades later. In 1982, a British record label, Krazy Kat, compiled most of his solo singles on an album called Rock & Roll Fever. Sales proved buoyant across Europe, although the distributors thought that Egan had died.

A R&B promoter, Steve Brigati, managed to find Egan subsisting on handouts in South Los Angeles and told him his album was a hit. A stunned Egan replied "What album? I haven't recorded anything in 25 years". Within weeks in September 1983, Egan was performing in the Electric Ballroom in London, backed by the saxophonist Big Jay McNeely. Chuck Higgins and Young Jessie were on the same bill. During the time of his stay in England, Egan recorded Going Back to Louisiana (1984, Ace Records), which got a generous reception. The album contained Egan's version of Amos Milburn's "Chicken Shack Boogie". Upon his return to his homeland, Egan recorded for the Lonesome Town label and played on the college circuit. He also performed in Los Angeles, duly sponsored by the Southern California Blues Society. The lack of appeal of an aging boogie-woogie bluesman in the 1980s and 1990s saw his eventual retirement loom.

In 1983, Egan was interviewed by the Los Angeles Times and stated "From all them records, I didn't make no money. In them days you heard a lot about royalties, but none of us ever saw any".

On August 5, 2004, and following a long struggle against the effects of cancer, Willie Egan died at the age of 70 in Daniel Freeman Memorial Hospital in Inglewood, California. His existence warranted an obituary in the Los Angeles Times, and The Boston Globe.

== Discography ==
=== Singles ===
Year	Title	Record label	Billed as
1949	"It's A Shame" / "Willie's Boogie"	Elko Records	Little Willie Egan
1955	"Don't Know Where She Went" / "Potato Stomp"	Mambo Records	Lloyd and Willie
1955	"Come On" / "Oh Baby"	Mambo Records	Willie Egans and Orchestra
1955	"What A Shame" / "Wow Wow"	Mambo Records	Willie Eggins and Orchestra
1955	"Sometimes I Wonder" / "Sad Sad Feeling"	Mambo Records	Willie Egans and Orchestra
1956	"I Can't Understand It" / "Wear Your Black Dress"	Vita Records	Willie Egans and Orchestra
1956	"She's Gone Away, But" / "Willie's Blues"	Vita Records	Willie Egans and Orchestra
1957	"Treat Me Right" / "You Must Be Foolin'"	Vita Records	Willie Egans
1958	"Rock and Roll Fever" / "Chittlin's"	Dash Records	Willie Egan

=== Albums ===
Year	Title	Record label	Billed as
1982	Rock & Roll Fever	Krazy Kat Records	Willie Egan
1982	Willie Egan & His Friends	Vita Records	Willie Egan
1984	Going Back to Louisiana	Ace Records	Willie Egan
2012	Willie's Blues (remastered)	Broken Audio	Willie Egan
