= Martin Gordon =

English pianist and bassist (born 1954)

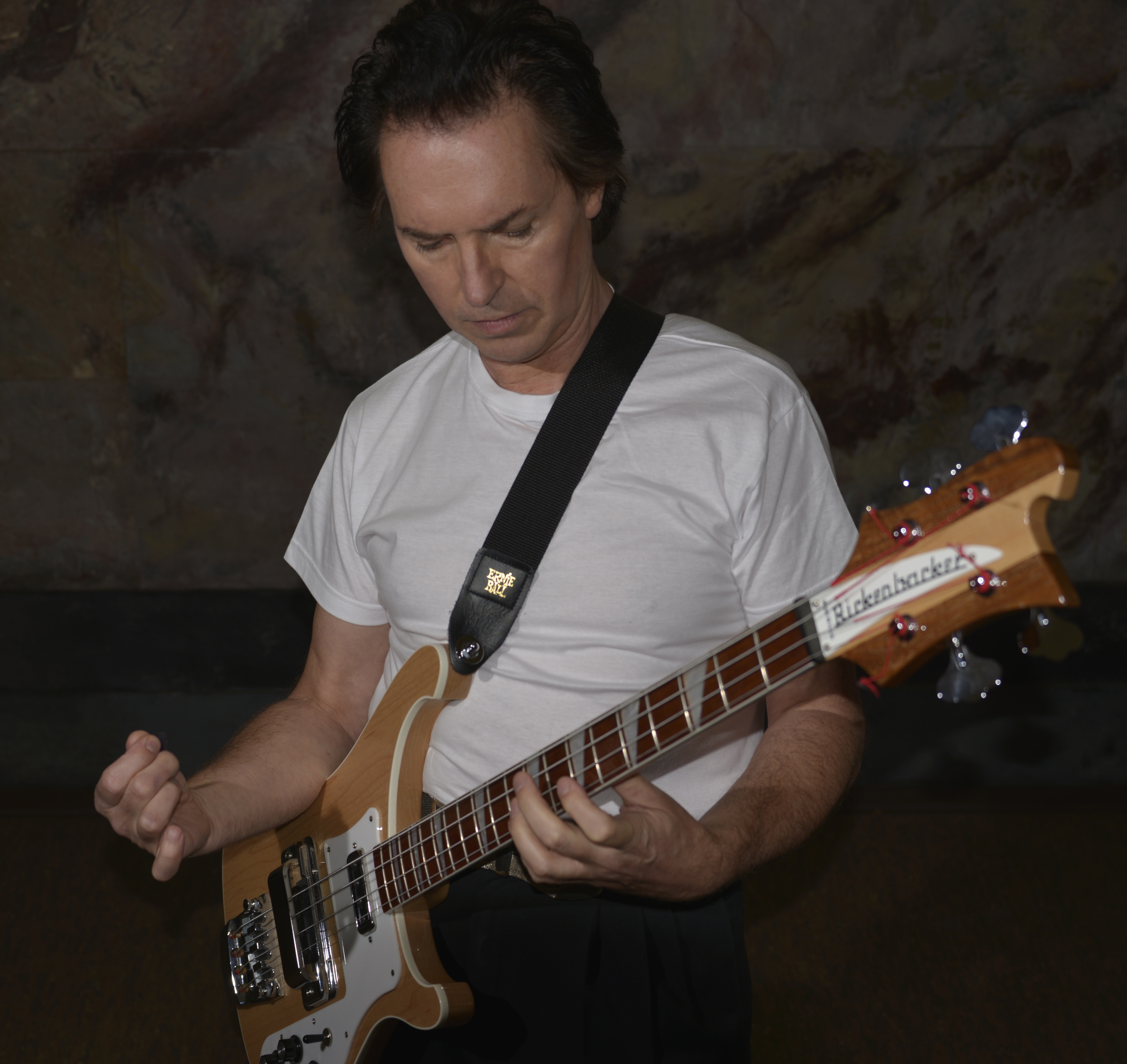
- Martin Gordon

Background information
- Born: 3 May 1954 (age 72); Ipswich, Suffolk, England
- Genres: Rock
- Occupation: Musician
- Instruments: Bass guitar; double bass; piano
- Years active: 1970s–present
- Member of: Radio Stars
- Formerly of: Sparks; Jet
- Website: martingordon.de

Martin Gordon (born 3 May 1954) is an English musician who plays bass guitar, double bass, and piano. He is known for his work with the art pop duo Sparks and the glam rock band Jet, the latter reforming as the punk group Radio Stars. In the 1980s, Gordon performed session work for many bands, and in the 1990s he participated in world music, especially in several gamelan orchestras. He resumed rock and pop work in the 2000s.

== Biography ==
Martin Gordon was born in Ipswich, and grew up in Hitchin, Hertfordshire. He studied piano and classical guitar as a child and attended summer schools hosted by the British National Jazz Youth Orchestra, where he took lessons from Nucleus bassist Jeff Clyne.

Gordon began his musical career in the 1970s with the Californian pop brothers Ron Mael and Russell Mael in Sparks, who were seeking a bassist after their relocation to the UK. Gordon played with Sparks on the album Kimono My House (1974), which featured his trademark Rickenbacker 4001 bass. "This Town Ain't Big Enough for Both of Us" and "'Amateur Hour" were UK hits from that album. "This Town..." made No. 2 in the UK singles chart but, after one album, Gordon and Sparks parted company.

He then formed Jet (described by AllMusic as "the first supergroup of glam") and then Radio Stars. Both bands featured singer Andy Ellison, drummer Chris Townson, and guitarist Ian Macleod. Jet's album Jet was helmed by Queen producer Roy Thomas Baker. Between the demise of Jet and its reincarnation as Radio Stars in 1976, he performed briefly with pioneer of American punk Ian North; along with drummer Paul Simon, Gordon played a handful of dates with Ian's Radio before rejoining members of Jet to form Radio Stars.

Radio Stars achieved a modicum of success with a single "Nervous Wreck" (which charted at No. 38 in the UK singles chart) and two critically well-received albums Songs for Swinging Lovers and Holiday Album. The band has been anthologised with Two Minutes Mr Smith (Moonlight Records) and Somewhere There's a Place For Us (Ace Records). Ace Records re-released the Radio Stars catalogue on CD in 2003. In 2008, Radio Stars reformed for a gig at London's Blow Up Metro Club, to promote the release of live recordings from the 1970s entitled Something for the Weekend. The performance featured original members Martin Gordon, Andy Ellison and Ian Macleod accompanied by drummer Steve Budney who performed on Gordon's 2007 solo debut in Boston, Massachusetts, United States. The band also performed one-off gigs at the Rebellion Festival in London (13 December 2008) and at London's 100 Club (22 January 2010). In 2017, the 4-CD box set Thinking Inside the Box was released by Cherry Red/Anagram Records, featuring the band's entire recorded output, BBC sessions and rarities.

== Session musician ==
Following the end of Radio Stars in 1979, Gordon moved to Paris, France, where he worked as house producer for Barclay Records, and played bass with the Rolling Stones during the recording of Emotional Rescue (1980). He returned to the UK at the beginning of the 1980s, and worked as producer and in other capacities with such musicians as George Michael, Boy George, Blur, Primal Scream, Kylie Minogue, S'Express, Tiger Lillies and Robert Palmer, as well as with a host of minor talents.

== World music ==
At the beginning of the 1990s, world music took Gordon initially to Bombay with Asha Bhosle and Boy George, and subsequently to Pakistan, Morocco, Egypt, Ghana and The Gambia. After studying gamelan in Bali on a Darmasiswa scholarship, he formed the short-lived Mira ensemble with journalist/musician Peter Culshaw in 1995, releasing an album New Hope For the Dead. They created an elaborate theatrical presentation, which delivered two performances at the Place Theatre, in London and an appearance at the Montreux Jazz Festival in 1997. He was a member of the SOAS-based (Balinese) Gamelan Kembang Kirang and the South Bank-based (Javanese) New Music Group between 1996 and 1997. Gordon performs with the Berlin-based (Indonesian gamelan group) Lindhu Raras. During 2019, Gordon was musical director/bassist of the Liberation Orchestra, with the participation of members of the Ensemble Modern, Wimme & Rinne and others, culminating with a one-off performance in Banjul, The Gambia, in the context of the AfriCourage festival in December 2019.

== Solo ==
Following the recording of an album in Istanbul with Turkish diva Sezen Aksu, Gordon played bass on Aksu's subsequent European tour (2002). This prompted his return to his pop music roots in 2003, via his own label Radiant Future Records.

He has a number of solo albums to his credit, many recorded in collaboration with Swedish vocalist Pelle Almgren. The first three solo releases were collected in a box-set titled The Mammal Trilogy (2006). Allmusic noted that "any release that reminds the world of the brilliance of Gordon's first three 21st century solo albums can only be applauded". His solo albums also feature a selection of Lennon–McCartney and Gilbert & Sullivan tunes alongside Gordon originals. In 2007, Gordon made his live debut as a solo performer in Boston, United States.

The fourth album God is on His Lunchbreak was accompanied by a book detailing the origins of the material, lyrics and assorted musing entitled The Illustrated and Annotated 'God's on His Lunchbreak, Please Call Back' Companion Volume, with illustrations by drummer Chris Townson. The fifth album Time Gentlemen Please was accompanied by the album Time Gentlemen Please – Demos, featuring Gordon's original demos of the material (available only via his website).

Gordon and vocalist Almgren made appearances in 2011 and 2012 as part of the Swedish garage-punk outfit 70–5 (various performances are to be found on YouTube). The sixth and final instalment of the Mammal Trilogy was entitled Include Me Out; released in August 2013, it was recorded in Berlin, Germany and Gnesta, Sweden and was accompanied by Words in Your Shell-Like, a book of Gordon's lyrics from Jet to the Mammal Trilogy. This brought the Trilogy to completion.

An album of Gilbert and Sullivan compositions Gilbert Gordon & Sullivan was released by Radiant Future Records in April 2016, as well as two singles, "Dump the Trump" in October 2016 and Idiots in March 2017. In 2018, Radiant Future released the album Thanks For All the Fish and the single Will of the People.

Gordon's album OMG was released in early 2020, along with a reworking of the Idiots single, entitled COVIDiots and in response to COVID activity and to the fact that German courts decided that the term was in fact allowable under German law. In 2021 he released Another Words, a setting to music of Donald Trump's phone call to Georgia governor Brad Raffensperger, released in 2021. At Xmas 2021, Gordon celebrated the political achievements of Boris Johnson with the single release Booster. Early in 2022, Radiant Future released an expanded version of Another Words featuring the original audio from the Trump-Raffensperger call, entitled Another Words - The Phonecall. In February 2022 Gordon released an instrumental track in support of Ukraine entitled Slava Ukraini. In 2023, the album "Greatest Sh!ts was released, featuring a selection of new and reworked material. 2024 saw the release of a pair of albums featuring earlier material, Singular Obscurities and Obscure Singularities.

In 2025, Gordon celebrated the arrival of a Large Orange Mass on the shores of the UK with the release of a new album of transcriptions of a recent orange speech by the 47th president of the USA, entitled 'His Mother Was a Woman'.

== Equipment ==
Gordon is known for using the Rickenbacker 4001 bass guitar, most notably on the Sparks album Kimono My House and the later album Jet by the British group of the same name. He has stated in the Rickenbacker Forum that he used H&H amplification for this recording. He used Rotosound round-wound strings to produce his benchmark sound. Such was his identification with the 4001 that he stated that he preferred to be sacked from the group Sparks rather than accommodate the request for him to use a different instrument. In Radio Stars, he used a Rickenbacker 3001 and a Fender Precision bass. In more recent times he has used Yamaha 5-string basses and Stagg upright e-basses, before returning to the Rickenbacker 4003 in 2014.

== Academia ==
As a result of his association with the Film University Brandenburg Konrad Wolf, Gordon stepped gingerly into academia with the publication of his first paper in 2025 by Abertay University, Dundee, in which he introduced his speech-based compositional methodology under the title of 'Trapped in the Tar Pit of Common Time'.

== Discography ==
=== Solo ===
Albums:

- 2025 His Mother Was a Woman (CD and download) - Radiant Future Records
- 2024 Singular Obscurities (download only) - Radiant Future Records
- 2024 Obscure Singularities (download only) - Radiant Future Records
- 2023 Greatest Sh!ts (CD and download) - Radiant Future Records
- 2022 Another Words - The Phone Call (expanded edition) (download) - Radiant Future Records
- 2021 Another Words (CD and download) - Radiant Future Records
- 2020 OMG (CD and download) - Radiant Future Records
- 2018 Thanks For All the Fish (CD, vinyl and download) - Radiant Future Records
- 2016 Gilbert Gordon & Sullivan (CD and download) - Radiant Future Records
- 2013 Include Me Out (limited edition CD-R, then download-only) – Radiant Future Records
- 2009 Time Gentlemen Please (CD and download) – Radiant Future Records
- 2008 Hello Boston! – (CD with Radio Stars' Something for the Weekend) – Radiant Future Records
- 2007 The World Is Your Lobster (CD and download) – Radiant Future Records
- 2006 The Mammal Trilogy (3-disc box set compilation of the above three releases) – Radiant Future Records
- 2006 How Am I Doing So Far? (single CD compilation of the first three solo releases w/bonus tracks) – Radiant Future Records
- 2005 God's on His Lunchbreak (Please Call Back) (CD and download) – Radiant Future Records
- 2004 The Joy of More Hogwash (CD and download) - Radiant Future Records
- 2003 The Baboon in the Basement (CD and download) - Radiant Future Records
- 2003 The Baboon in the Basement Radio EP (promo-only) – Radiant Future Records

Alternative versions:

- 2013 Exclude Me In - Demos (limited edition CD-R, then download-only) – Radiant Future Records
- 2009 Time Gentlemen Please – Demos (limited edition CD-R, then download-only) – Radiant Future Records

Singles:

- 2025 My Mother Was a Woman (download-only) - Radiant Future Records
- 2024 Mudbath (download-only) - Radiant Future Records
- 2024 A True Totalitarian (download-only) - Radiant Future Records
- 2023 No Sweat (download-only) - Radiant Future Records
- 2022 Dumber Than a Rock (download-only) - Radiant Future Records
- 2022 Slawa Ukraini! (download-only) - Radiant Future Records
- 2021 Booster (download-only) - Radiant Future Records
- 2021 Somewhere Over the Rainbow (download-only) - Radiant Future Records
- 2021 All the Rage (download-only) - Radiant Future Records
- 2020 Superior Jeans (download-only) - Radiant Future Records
- 2020 COVIDiots (download-only) - Radiant Future Records
- 2019 Will of the People (download-only) - Radiant Future Records
- 2018 God's Not Great (download-only) - Radiant Future Records
- 2017 Idiots (download-only) - Radiant Future Records
- 2016 Dump the Trump! (download-only) - Radiant Future Records
- 2016 Modern Major General (download-only) Radiant Future Records

=== John's Children ===
- 2011 Black & White – Acid Jazz AJXCD 234
- 2002 Music For the Herd of Herring (CD and download) - Radiant Future Records

=== Blue Meanies ===
- 2006 Pop Sensibility – Radiant Future Records (download only)

=== Mira ===
- 1995 New Hope for the Dead – JVC Records
- 2008 New Hope for the Dead – Radiant Future Records re-issued version with extra material including live tracks, remixes and unreleased content – (download only)

=== Radio Stars ===
- 2017 Thinking Inside the Box – Cherry Red Records
- 2008 Something for the Weekend – Radiant Future Records (live in 1977/78)released 2006 Radiant Future Records
- 2002 Music For the Herd of Herring – Radiant Future Records
- 1992 Somewhere There's A Place For Us – Ace Records (compilation of the above releases)
- 1978 Holiday Album – Chiswick Records (re-released 2006 by Ace Records )
- 1977 Songs For Swinging Lovers – Chiswick Records (re-released 2006 by Ace Records )

=== Jet ===
- 2020 Jet – Sony BMG - original release made officially available digitally
- 2010 Some Flotsam – Live in 75 – Radiant Future Records live on the Hunter-Ronson tour 1975, download only, withdrawn 2011
- 2010 Jet & Even More Light Than Shade – RPM Records (UK) – reissue of original album, expanded double album set, withdrawn 2011
- 2002 Music For the Herd of Herring – Radiant Future Records
- 2003 Jet – Radiant Future Records reissue of original album, withdrawn 2004
- 2003 More Light than Shade – Radiant Future Records demos for second album, withdrawn 2011
- 1975 Jet – CBS

=== Sparks ===
- 1974 Kimono My House – Island Records
