= River Rivals =

1967 British film by Harry Booth

- Directed by: Harry Booth
- Screenplay by: Harry Booth; Michael Barnes
- Based on: book Houseboat Children by Linda Graeme
- Produced by: Roy Simpson
- Starring: Renée Houston; Brian Haines; Darryl Read
- Cinematography: Alan Pudney
- Edited by: Bill Creed
- Music by: Ken Jones
- Production company: Century Film Productions
- Release date: 1967
- Running time: 14–21 minutes per episode (7 episodes)
- Country: United Kingdom
- Language: English

River Rivals is a 1967 British children's film series directed by Harry Booth and starring Renée Houston, Brian Haines and Darryl Read. It was written by Booth and Michael Barnes based on the book Houseboat Children by Linda Graeme. The series comprised seven short episodes and was produced for the Children's Film Foundation.

== Plot ==
The Holmes and Craig families are rivals in an upcoming race for "do-it-yourself" boat builders. The Holmes spend time helping eccentric Mrs. Fredericks on her houseboat "The Golden Dragon". Mr. Craig, however, wants Mrs. Fredericks' mooring rights, and when his daughter Molly cuts her houseboat adrift in the river, causing damage to weir, Mrs. Fredericks is sent a large repairs bill by the river authority. To help her raise money, the Holmes children open a café on her the boat. Mr Craig allows Mrs. Fredericks to run up large expenses in the shops he owns, but then cancels her debts in exchange for her boat's figurehead, which, believing her late husband was a pirate, he thinks is full of treasure. Later Molly confesses that she cut Mrs. Fredericks' boat adrift, and Mr Craig discovers his treasure is in fact worthless Chinese banknotes.

== Episodes ==
This section is sourced from the CFF catalogue.

1. "The Golden Dragon"
2. "The Blockade Runners"
3. "The Night Raiders"
4. "Operation Airlift"
5. "Mission Accomplished"
6. "Shipwreck"
7. "The Dragon's Secret"

== Cast ==
- Renée Houston as Mrs. Fredericks
- Brian Haines as Mr. Craig
- Darryl Read as Ricky Holmes
- Sally Thomsett as Penny Holmes
- Cordel Leigh as Tich Holmes
- Philip Meredith as Mike Craig
- Rufus Frampton as Pete Craig
- Julie Booth as Molly Craig
- Charles Lamb as Jorkins
- Dick Emery
- Rona Anderson
- John Cazabon
- Ian Fleming
- Keith Marsh
- Bartlett Mullins

== Production ==
It was made at Shepperton Studios, and on location (per film titles).

== Reception ==
The Monthly Film Bulletin wrote: "Light-hearted but rather unexciting children's serial, involving much slapstick and hi-jinks on the river. The material doesn't leave much room for manoeuvre, and most of the humour is traditional; but some of the gags, notably the enterprising use the children make of a multi-armed oriental statue, are quite inventive. Renee Houston's initial appearance, in naufical garb, promises eccentricity, but the character soon becomes more genial than odd. Children should find it all engaging enough, though it is not for those with sturdier appetites for adventure."

== Releases ==
The film was shown at the 1981 Satori International Children’s Film Festival in New York, retitled as Secret of the Golden Dragon.
