= Five Have a Mystery to Solve (film) =

1964 British film serial by Ernest Morris

- Opening title card
- Directed by: Ernest Morris
- Written by: Michael Barnes
- Based on: Five Have a Mystery to Solve by Enid Blyton
- Starring: David Palmer; Darryl Read
- Cinematography: Douglas Ransom
- Music by: Edward Williams
- Release date: May 1964
- Country: United Kingdom

Five Have a Mystery to Solve is a 6-part 1964 British children's film serial directed by Ernest Morris and starring David Palmer and Darryl Read. It was written by Michael Barnes based on the novel of the same name by Enid Blyton, and made by the Children's Film Foundation.

== Plot ==
The Famous Five – Julian, Dick, George, Anne and Tim the dog – are visiting a seaside cottage and befriend young Wilfred, an orphan. Hearing that animals may be in danger on nearby Whispering Island, Wilfred goes to investigate and soon finds himself in trouble. The Famous Five go to his rescue.

== Cast ==
- Mandy Harper as George (as Amanda Coxell)
- David Palmer as Julian
- Darryl Read as Dick
- Paula Boyd as Anne
- Tuck as Tim the Dog
- Michael Wennink as Wilfred
- Michael Balfour as Emilio
- Robin Hunter as Carlo
- Keith Pyott as Sir Hugo Blaize
- Grace Arnold
- Howard Douglas
- Diane Powell as Sally

== Critical reception ==
The Monthly Film Bulletin wrote: "Perhaps because the Enid Blyton story provides a poor basis for the matter-of-fact realism which one happily associates with Children's Film Foundation productions, this serial is certainly not fare for adults. It has, in fact, that moralising – maybe even patronising – tone so easily acquired and so much to be avoided in anything made specifically for the young. Moreover, to the adult, and that probably means to many children as well, it is far too crammed with implausibilities (e.g children burrowing through the earth like badgers) to work well as a thriller. One finds it hard enough to believe in the extent to which the juvenile characters are allowed to operate without adult intervention. Neatly made and nicely acted, this is a serial likely to appeal because it fills a familiar niche in the programme rather than for any intrinsic merit."

Kine Weekly wrote: "With the locale of the story on the coast of Cornwall the picture is well served pictorially and the menace of the men is softened by interpolated comedy. The introduction of various animals and an intriguing episode in which Wilfred employs a mouse to effect his release add charm to the proceedings. Michael Wennink, who plays the part of Wilfred, is a spirited youngster, a capable juvenile actor and he has eager support from the other children."

DVD Beaver called it "tremendously entertaining."
