= Darryl Read =

Musical artist (1951–2013)

- Darryl Read live at the White Trash Club, Berlin (2009)

Background information
- Born: Darryl Michael Roy Read; 19 September 1951; Exeter, Devon, England
- Died: 23 June 2013 (aged 61) Pattaya, Thailand
- Genres: Punk rock, hard rock, psychedelic rock
- Occupations: Poet, musician, singer, songwriter, writer, actor, film producer
- Instruments: Vocals, guitar, drums
- Years active: 1963–2013
- Labels: Beat Kat Records, Cherry Red, White Label Records, Madstar Records, Lemon Records, Rpm Records (UK), Rock Chix Records

Darryl Michael Roy Read (19 September 1951 – 23 June 2013) was a British singer, guitarist, drummer, actor, poet and writer. In the late 1960s, Read was a member of Crushed Butler, considered by some to be amongst the forerunners of proto punk and punk rock. He collaborated with musicians such as Bill Legend, Mickey Finn and Ray Manzarek.

Read appeared as a child actor in a number of films, including, aged 13, in Daylight Robbery (1964), for which he won a silver medal for best actor at the Venice Film Festival. He also appeared onstage in two rock-based plays and a number of television programmes. He was a published author of poetry as well as a biographical novel.

Read was killed in a motorcycle incident in Thailand in 2013.

== Early years and career ==
Read was born in Exeter, where his father Hedley Read was working on a stage production of A Streetcar Named Desire. Read struggled at school (he was later diagnosed dyslexic) and following his parents divorce, he lived with his grandparents. Following his grandmother's death when he was seven years old, Read was sent to Parkside Boarding School, in East Horsley. The establishment has moved location and is now known as Parkside School, Cobham.

Read attended an audition at the Corona Academy for Dramatic Arts in Chiswick, west London, and he was accepted. He left boarding school the following term in early 1963. Within two weeks of joining Corona Academy Read worked professionally, with a background role on the 1963 film The V.I.P.s. The following week he featured in a Persil commercial. By the end of his first term, he appeared in the Children's Film Foundation film The Young Detectives, replacing the original actor who had fallen ill. He then played Dick in the 1964 film Five Have a Mystery to Solve, based on an Enid Blyton Famous Five book.

He left Corona in 1968 with a small number of film and TV acting credits under his belt including a Venice Film Festival award for his role in the film Daylight Robbery. At 17 Read appeared in Fabulous 208, a teenage magazine. Read had been playing the drums and the guitar at the age of 14, and with Michael Des Barres he formed the rock pop group the Orange Illusion in 1967.

Read also appeared in a 1967 episode of Dixon of Dock Green, the 1968 film The Lost Continent and a 1969 episode of Z-Cars.

== Late-1960s bands ==
In early 1968 Read became interested in the Edgar Broughton Band and Mick Farren of the Deviants. Read's then girlfriend, Nikki Johnson, found him his first manager, Robin Hemingway. Hemingway had worked with T-Bone Walker and introduced Read to soul music. Whilst trying to secure a record contract for Read, Hemingway got Read to record demos at Decca Studios, as well as inviting him to a Beatles session at Abbey Road Studios, and introduced him to Jimi Hendrix.

Read continued to switch between playing drums and guitar whilst continuing acting work. Read was asked by Emperor Rosko to form a group for his brother Jeff Pasternak from American west coast psychedelic band The Pasternak Progress. The Pasternak Progress named after Jeff's surname "Pasternak", released one rare single "Cotton Soul" b/w "Flower Eyes" in 1967. Read recruited Lou Martin and Stuart MacDonald, members of blues outfit Killing Floor, and guitarist Chris Gibbons to form The Krayon Angels. They played in London and recorded a demo album but the group split in early 1969, when Jeff Pasternak and Chris Gibbons created a Simon & Garfunkel-type duo. Read did another album demo for them and gave them the name Smooth Loser, which they later utilised as a rock band. The demo album Read made with Krayon Angels was eventually released in 2000 on Dig The Fuzz Records.

Read joined an Edmonton-based soul outfit called the Keith Locke Band, playing drums. Read was the only white player amongst Locke, Derrick Johnson and Rosko Gee, who went on to become members of Bob Marley's band and Traffic. At this time Read also rehearsed with a rock trio in Pimlico, London, and after one rehearsal, came across Jesse Hector and Alan Butler, ex-mods who arrived to rehearse without a drummer – they jammed and decided to work together, and inside eight weeks got backing and management from an East End market worker called Graham Breslau. Read came up with a band name - Crushed Butler - and they recorded a demo at Regent Sound Studios in Denmark Street called 'It's My Life'. The trio played their first gig at the Country Club, West Hampstead, supporting Osibisa. Crushed Butler dressed in hand-cut slash neck red T-shirts, straight legged Levis jeans with studded belts. Hector had short cropped hair with massive mutton chops, Butler had a crop cut centre parting hairdo and large sideburns, Read had a lion's shag of dark hair and continually sported a black leather vintage motorbike jacket, with a blue/white hooped T-shirt and Cuban heels. Altogether their image looked liked the Clash several years before the Clash formed, and Hector's voice sounded like John Lydon, only in 1969.

Breslau pulled in his friend, Gerald Horgan to help manage the group. They recorded at EMI, Dick James Music DJM studios and De Lane Lea studios. They also recorded at Decca's West Hampstead studios and Marquee Studios, but they failed to get a recording deal even though they were supporting major acts like Mott the Hoople, Atomic Rooster and UFO.

Within a year Breslau pulled out of the management deal, and took all their equipment back, and though Gerald Horgan remained friends with Read he couldn't do much to help further the group's career. The group changed their name to 'Tiger' and went through a succession of bass players including ex-Smile bassist Barry Wyles, and were managed by Neil Christian for a while. After recruiting Alan Butler back into the group they worked together again and recorded "High School Dropout" at Marquee Studios. They finally split in 1971 after being continually turned down and out of work. Hector and Butler later found success with their band the Hammersmith Gorillas, later shortened to the Gorillas in 1977.

== 1970s to mid-1980s ==
In 1971 Read was struggling financially and heavily using amphetamines and sleeping pills. He started working at Track Records as a songwriter and assistant to John "Speedy" Keen. Read also worked with Terry Stamp and Jim Avery of pro-Fidel Castro activist proto punk garage band rockers Third World War as a songwriter. In 1972 Read recorded a demo track, 'Razor City', with Terry Stamp and continued to work on-and-off with Stamp and Avery until 2000.

In late 1972, Read joined ex-Silverhead guitarist Steve Forest, playing drums in a glam rock trio called Dizzy. The band split after their manager ran out of money, and stopped backing the band – reclaiming equipment he paid for. At the end of the summer of 1972, Read joined singer/lead-guitarist Barry Pyatt at Butlin's in Bognor Regis, in a cabaret combo by the name of "Sugar and Spice". In 1972 Read joined as drummer the theatrical tour of rock musical Hair. Read got Steve Forest the job as lead guitarist, and they toured with the show for one year, Read had originally got the part of 'the Recruit' in the show and was to be part of the Tribe, but realised he'd make more money if he played drums and became the bandleader.

In 1975, Read began pursuing a front man singer/guitarist career and continued to switch between music and acting and got a song publishing deal with Famous Chapel. In early 1976 Read recorded songs at Polydor with Steve Forest and Charlie Harty, including a track titled 'On The Streets Tonight'. Again Read's songs and band were turned down again by Nick Mobs of EMI who said: "It wasn't funky enough!" Five months later Mobbs signed the Sex Pistols.

In 1977, Read played Keith Richards in the stage production of Let the Good Stones Roll. There were more television performances including a featured role in Rock Follies, Minder and Read taken on by Tony Meehan to record five of his own penned tracks.

In 1980 Read landed a role in the Royal Shakespeare Company's production of Barrie Keeffe's play Bastard Angel, and in the same year, he recorded his first solo single 'Living on Borrowed Time'/'West End Girl' produced by Ray Hendrikson.

Read moved to Spain in 1985 but whilst on a stop-off in Berlin, he started playing some bars, cafés and clubs, one being the Ex Und Pop punk club where he was rediscovered by Dimitri Leningrad, who put him on the Berlin underground circuit as 'Darryl Read's Hearts of Darkness'. This led to Read recording a cover version of the Rolling Stones' "Play With Fire", which became an underground hit and played on German radio for three months. He signed a publishing deal with Peter Radzuhn and Tom Muller at Hansa Tone Studios who flew in Paul Thompson of Roxy Music to work with Read in the studio. The Hearts of Darkness now consisted of Read (lead vocals/guitar), Paul Thomson (drums), Volker Janssen (keyboards) and Graham Sears (bass). They recorded a mini album No Soul Through Midnight in 1986 and released a 16mm promo film titled No Place which featured Connover Farndon and ex-Stray Cats manager Tony Bidgood. Read directed the piece with Steve Ingle and other students from the British Film School.

== California ==
Read was recruited by Terence Pearce (a.k.a. Terence Wilde/Terry Wilde) to replace singer Paul Roberts in the band High Frontier in London, after Roberts left to join The Stranglers. High Frontier had American shows planned when the band broke up, but Pearce decided to go anyway. He and Read flew to Los Angeles in 1987, picked up various musicians in Hollywood, where they began writing and recording the album Book of the Dead under the name The Hearts of Darkness. They were at that time managed by Scott Tarlow (later known as Justin Marquis, singer of the band The Veil). Read was a friend of Ray Manzarek of the Doors. When The Hearts of Darkness were booked to play a show at the historic Variety Arts Centre Theatre, Downtown L.A., Manzarek asked if he could play keyboards at the gig, which he did. Whilst making the album 'Book of the Dead' Ray Manzarek listened and advised with Reed and Pearce in the studio. Read collaborated again with Terry Stamp, who now lived in Los Angeles, on some of the song writing duties.

During this time Read and the other Hearts of Darkness members appeared in a low-budget B horror film entitled Midnight for Mortica. By chance he was introduced to Gloria Jones and discussed the possibility of doing a film about Marc Bolan as Jones's friend Robert Hyatt had written a script on Bolan's life. Despite critical success in America with The Hearts of Darkness, Read argued with Pearce & Tarlow over writing credits and money and eventually split from Pearce and Tarlow (who went on to form the band The Veil) and returned to Europe.

Read started playing with a rockabilly group called the Mighty Hornets and jammed with them frequently at the Spice Club where they were the resident house group. Around this time he met John Entwistle of The Who, and jammed with him at the China Club; the jam was caught on video by the club's engineer as Read sung "I Can't Explain". The Hornets and Read eventually made an album at Paramount Recording Studios in 1992 titled Beat Existentialist featuring Ray Manzarek on three tracks.

== Later career ==
Read returned to live in London and joined Dino Dines and Miller Anderson (ex T. Rex) in 1994, to do shows as X T. Rex, featuring the works of Marc Bolan. After X T. Rex split, Read was introduced by Barry Smith to Bill Legend of the original T. Rex. The two struck up a partnership – recording three records: Teenage Dream, Gods 'n' Angels and Walking in Shadows as 'Darryl Read and the Nightriders'. Mickey Finn, also of the original T. Rex, joined them on the recordings and some shows, the last being an all-star line-up including Zoot Money and Finn; the concert was filmed at the 100 Club in London.

Bernard White then managed Read, and released his records on his White Label Records company. They went on to produce a promo film at the Roundhouse, London with Gerald Horgan. The promo film was for "Teenage Dream", a Marc Bolan song, and "Hard on Love", Read's original composition. The video for Teenage Dream was produced, directed and edited by Spyros Melaris whose next project was the infamous 'Alien Autopsy' footage. Melaris came up with the concept for the promo and worked very closely with Read to create a little bit of 'Rock History' by filming in the legendary 'Roundhouse'. Read and the Nightriders continued for a while and did a television slot for the Live TV Television company.

=== Crushed Butler recordings ===
In 1998, Dig The Fuzz Records released Crushed Butler "Uncrushed", demos of Read's proto punk group. Crushed Butler "Uncrushed" album was reissued on compact disc with a new bonus track entitled High School Dropout(2nd Version) by RPM/Cherry Red Records in 2005. In 1999 White and Read wrote a screenplay for the low-budget film production of Remember a Day and Richard Wright of Pink Floyd gave White the rights to the track of the same title to use for the drama which was based heavily on Syd Barrett of Pink Floyd. The film also starred Zoot Money, Jamie Foreman, Peter Jenner and Jenny Fabian – the author of Groupie.

=== Ray Manzarek ===
Also in 1998, Ray Manzarek and Read released a poetry album with music titled Freshly Dug. The album was subsequently re-issued twice thereafter, once in 2005 on the 'Cherryl Red' label (Lemon Records) and in 2006 on the Madstar Records label for Germany. Read was inspired by Ray Manzarek to write a poetry book titled Set, illustrated by George Underwood in 1999, hardcover, and in 2000 in a paperback version.

Read continued to play concerts in Europe under the banner of 'Darryl Read's Beat Existentialists', and in 2007 released another poetry/music album with Ray Manzarek titled Bleeding Paradise. In 2008 he filmed additional sequences in the UK for a new version of Remember A Day (distributed by Contemporary films UK) and guested regularly on Radio Eins Berlin, as DJ with his own Beat X show. In 2009 Set was translated into German, and Colectomatic Volume 3 was released. And in the same year "Teenage Dream" along with the promo from the Roundhouse was re-issued.

In mid-2009, Read recorded a Mick Farren song titled "Somewhere To Go". The track was featured on a tribute album paying homage to the Pink Fairies and the Deviants, which featured the likes of the Damned, the Dead Kennedys, Wilko Johnson, and the Only Ones. In mid November 2009 Crushed Butler Uncrushed was re-issued for the third time; this version on 12-inch vinyl with a new bonus track entitled Let It Ring, was released worldwide by Radio Heartbeat Records, New York City.

In August 2010, Windian Records USA released Crushed Butler's "It's My Life"/"My Son's Alive" on vinyl, and on 19 September 2010 Read released his latest album: All the Ghosts of Rock 'n' Roll, produced by Italo/German producer Stephan Kroll.

On 17 May 2011, Read released the single called "Money Number One" which was recorded in Thailand and produced by Barry Upton. In February 2013 a fourth re-issue on vinyl, of the Crushed Butler 'Uncrushed' album was released by Last Years Youth records in Germany. Read played concerts worldwide as well performing poetry readings and being involved with film production. He was to be featured in a documentary on his prolific career, produced by German film maker Bernd Libbach. This was in early stages of production at the time of his death.

== Death ==
Read died in a motorcycle road incident in Pattaya, Thailand, on 23 June 2013.

== Filmography ==
- The Young Detectives (1963) as Moggs
- Five Have a Mystery to Solve (1964) as Dick
- Daylight Robbery (1964) as Darryl
- Son of the Sahara (1966) as Abu
- River Rivals (1967) as Ricky Holmes
- The Lost Continent (1968) as El Diablo
- Great Catherine (1968) as Young Peter
- Remember a Day (2000) as Roger Bannerman (final film role)

== Television ==
- "Five O'Clock Club" (2 episodes, 1964) a.k.a. Ollie and Fred's Five O'Clock Club (UK: new title)
- "Theatre 625" The Seekers (1964) TV episode as French peasant boy
- "Under Milk Wood" (BBC play 1964) as young Waldo
- "Christmas Night with the Stars" (1 episode, 1964) – as featured, TV episode
- "The Flying Swan" as Michael (3 episodes, 1965) – The Contract (1965) TV episode as Michael – Lady in Waiting (1965) TV episode as Michael
- "A Tale of Two Cities" (3 episodes, 1965) TV episodes as Jerry Cruncher Jr.
- "Six" Andy's Game (1965) TV film as Malcolm
- "Our Man at St. Mark's" (1 episode, 1966) TV series as Peter
- "The Canterville Ghost" Mystery and Imagination (1966) TV episode as Stripe
- "Lost Hearts" Mystery and Imagination (1966) TV episode as Giovanni
- "Mrs Thursday" We Don't Pay London Prices (1967) TV episode as Boy
- "Dixon of Dock Green" (1 episode), The Run (1967) TV episode as Chris Conway
- "Half Hour Story" as Delivery boy (1 episode, 1967)
- "You and the World" as Tony (2 episodes, 1968)
- "The Saint" as French Student – The Ex-King of Diamonds (1 episode, 1969)
- "Z-Cars" as Tommy Jones (2 episodes, 1969)
- Fear or Favour: Part 1 (1969) TV episode as Tommy Jones
- Fear or Favour: Part 2 (1969) TV episode as Tommy Jones
- "Rock Follies of '77" as Punk Rock Group Drummer (1 episode 1977) – The Hype TV episode as Punk Rock Group Drummer
- "A Bunch of Fives" (1977) TV (2 episodes) as Ronnie
- "Minder" Come in T-64, Your Time Is Ticking Away (1979) TV episode as Billy
- "Mackenzie" (1980) TV series as Rory (2 episodes)

== Stage ==
- Hair National UK tour as Drummer (1973)
- Joseph and the Amazing Technicolour Dreamcoat as Benjamin at the Civic Theatre, Chelmsford (1975)
- Let The Good Stones Roll as Keith Richards Premier production at the Edinburgh Festival (1977)
- Teeth 'n' Smiles as Inch at Wyndham's Theatre (1978)
- Bastard Angel as Steve, Premier production of the Royal Shakespeare Company (1980)

== Discography ==
=== Singles and EPs ===
- Let the Good Stones Roll (vinyl EP) Clubland Records (1977)
- Living on Borrowed Time/West End Girl Monarch Records (1980)
- Play with Fire/Trouble in the House of Love Berlin Limited Edition Records (1985)
- No Soul Through Midnight 'No Soul Through Midnight' (12" vinyl EP) Aim Records (1986)
- Teenage Dream Darryl Read and the Nightriders, (CD EP) White Label Records (1994)
- Walking in Shadows (CD EP) White Label Records (1995)
- Gods 'n' Angels (CD EP) White Label Records (1996)
- Maybe It's Good If You Look at It Twice Darryl Read & The Doctors, 'Poet House' (EP) Deep Bass Records Spain (2006)
- Stepping Ace Roadhouse (digital download EP) Beat Kat Records Germany (2008)
- Teenage Dream (digital download re-issue) Beat Kat Records Germany (2009)
- It's My Life /My Son's Alive Crushed Butler, (7" vinyl) Windian Records USA (2010)
- Razor City Terry Stamp & Darryl Read, (digital download) Beat Kat Records 006 Germany (2011)
- Money No 1 Darryl Read, (digital download) Beat Kat Records 007 Thailand (2011)

=== Albums ===
- Book of the Dead (CD), USA Bardo Records (1989)
- Beat Existentialist (CD), Rock Chix Records (1993)
- Colectomatic Volume 1 (CD), White Label Records (1997)
- Book of the Dead (CD reissue with bonus tracks) White Label Records UK
- Uncrushed Crushed Butler (10" vinyl), Dig The Fuzz Records UK (1998)
- Freshly Dug Ray Manzarek & Darryl Read (CD), Ozit/Morpheus Records (1999)
- Nineteen Sixty Nine Krayon Angels (12" vinyl), Dig The Fuzz Records UK (2000)
- Shaved (CD) Madstar Records Germany (2002)
- Freshly Dug (Freshly Re-Dug reissue) Ray Manzarek & Darryl Read, Madstar Records Germany (2005)
- Bleeding Paradise Ray Manzarek & Darryl Read, Beat Kat Records Germany (2007)
- Colectomatic Volume 2 (digital download) Beat Kat Records Germany (2009)
- 'Crushed Butler' 'Uncrushed' (12" vinyl) Radio Heartbeat Records USA (2009)
- Colectomatic Volume 3 (digital download) Beat Kat Records Germany (2010)
- All The Ghosts of Rock 'n' Roll (digital download) Beat Kat Records Germany (2010)
- Portobello Shuffle (tribute to Boss Goodman/Deviants & Pink Fairies) compilation Easy Action Records UK (2010)
- Crushed Butler 'Uncrushed' (10" vinyl) Last Years Youth Records Germany (2013)
