= Neil Christian =

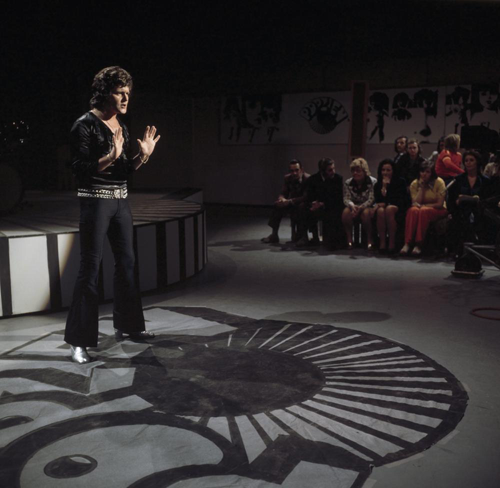
- Neil Christian in the Dutch television program Popzien, 8 June 1973

Background information
- Birth name: Christopher Tidmarsh
- Born: 14 February 1943; Hoxton, London, England
- Died: 4 January 2010 (aged 66)
- Genres: Rock and Roll
- Instrument: Vocals
- Years active: 1960s
- Labels: Strike
- Formerly of: The Crusaders

Neil Christian (born Christopher Tidmarsh, 14 February 1943 – 4 January 2010) was an English singer. Christian had a solo hit single in 1966, when "That's Nice" (written by Miki Dallon), reached Number 14 in the UK Singles Chart. He remains, however, a one-hit wonder. Follow-up singles "Oops" and "Two at a Time" never reached the charts. He was born Hoxton, East London.

== Career ==
Neil Christian and the Crusaders are one of the British rock and roll bands of the 1960s. They were signed to the Strike record label.

In the early 1960s Jimmy Page was asked to join The Crusaders. Page toured with Christian for approximately two years, and later played on several of his records, including their November 1962 single, "The Road to Love" / "The Big Beat Drum", released on Columbia and produced by Joe Meek under his RGM Sound imprint. At various times the band included Albert Lee and Alex Dmochowski, who later joined Aynsley Dunbar Retaliation.

When most of the line-up left to join Lord Sutch's Savages in 1965, Christian took on members of Luton Band The Hustlers, including Mick Abrahams, although in 1966 a touring version of The Crusaders was put together to promote the hit single "That's Nice" which consisted of Tony Marsh (piano) (b. Anthony Marsh, 1946); Jimmy "Tornado" Evans (drums); Ritchie Blackmore (guitar); and Bibi Blange (bass). Further singles failed to reach the charts, however, and Christian moved to Germany, where he remained popular.

In late 1970, Christian took on the management of Crushed Butler who changed their name to Tiger. Christian got them into recording studios both in Wembley at the new De Lane Lea Studios where he produced five songs by the band, and Tooting, London, at a demo studio producing the first version of Tiger's glam rock song "High School Dropout" in January 1971.

Everything Christian released between 1962 and 1968 has been reissued on the CD compilation, That's Nice, which also added several unreleased recordings from the same era.

== Related session musicians ==
- Paul Brett
- Jimmy Page
- Ritchie Blackmore
- Nicky Hopkins
- Albert Lee
- Mick Abrahams
- Carlo Little

== See also ==
- One-hit wonders in the UK
- List of performances on Top of the Pops
- Jacki Bond
- Samantha Juste
- Crushed Butler
- Darryl Read
