= Jacki Bond =

British singer

Jacki Bond was a secretary working for Strike Records in the mid-1960s who, though without previous musical experience, had a short recording career in 1965-7. She came from South London and, with Samantha Juste, who co-hosted BBC television's Top of the Pops, was one of two British female vocalists signed to Strike or (in Juste's case) its subsidiary, Go.

== Recording career ==
Bond's first single record, My Sister's Boy, was released in 1965 by Columbia records, an EMI subsidiary, under license from Millwick Music, the publishing company from which Strike emerged. Her second, Tell Him to Go Away, which was coupled with Don't You Worry ('bout Me) (a song written by the head of Strike, Lionel Segal, and arranged by Alan Caddy, former lead guitarist of The Tornados.), appeared in March 1966. It was only the second record to be released by Strike. The first, Neil Christian's That's Nice, had been widely promoted by Radio London and other "pirate" stations and reached number 14 in the British sales charts, however Bond did not enjoy similar success. In fact, That's Nice proved to be Strike's only chart success.

Bond's third and final single, the highly infectious He Say, released by Strike in November 1966 and coupled with Why Can't I Love Him, was written by Pierre Tubbs and Bond herself and recorded with an orchestra conducted by Ken Woodman. It has been described as "an irresistibly uptempo slab of New York-style girl-pop", but, though popular on the Northern soul circuit, Strike lacked the promotional machinery to help make it a commercial success. (Even Samantha Juste's No One Needs My Love Today, issued in the same month, which she performed on Top of the Pops, made little impact.)

== Demise of Strike Records ==
In 1967 Bond recorded Lionel Bart's Reviewing the Situation from the musical Oliver!, but Strike folded before it could be released. The company's final single, Our Plastic Dream's vaguely psychedelic A Little Bit of Shangrila, was released by Go in August 1967 as the "Summer of Love" was reaching its climax. Reviewing the Situation was released 36 years later on a compilation album.

== A note on images ==
According to Pierre Tubbs, Bond was short, with long hair. Photographs of her during her brief recording career, if they exist, are elusive. None has appeared with re-releases of Strike recordings. There is a photo of her on a single from 1966 released by Strike, entitled Don't you worry/Tell him to go away

Bond went on to sign with Larry Page of Page One Records under the name of Judi Scott where she released a song dedicated to George Best.

== Discography ==
Date of release	Songs	Label
1965	My Sister's Boy c/w Now I Know	Columbia
March 1966	Tell Him To Go Away c/w Don't You Worry ('bout Me)	Strike
November 1966	He Say c/w Why Can't I Love Him	Strike
2003	Reviewing the Situation [recorded 1967] (Dream Babes: Volume 4)	RPM
