= Ace Records (United Kingdom) =

British record label

- Parent company: Ace Records Ltd.
- Founded: 1978
- Founder: Ted Carroll, Roger Armstrong, Trevor Churchill
- Genre: Various, reissues
- Country of origin: England
- Location: London
- Official website: www.acerecords.co.uk

Ace Records Ltd. is a British record label founded in 1978. Initially the company only gained permission from the similarly named label based in Mississippi to use the name in the UK, but eventually also acquired the rights to publish their recordings. When Chiswick Records' pop side was licensed to EMI in 1984, Ace switched to more licensing and reissuing work. In the 1980s it also gained the licensing for Modern Records, and its follow-up company Kent Records, whilst in the 1990s, the company bought the labels including all original master tapes.

== Sublabels ==
The following labels are owned or licensed by Ace Records.

- Ace Records: initially the only label (reissues, also including Ace Records (US)): Rock 'n' Roll, Rockabilly, Rhythm & Blues, Cajun, 1950s and 1960s Pop, etc. It is well known for several series of releases: "The Golden Age of American Rock 'N' Roll"; "Early Girls"; "Teen Beat" (showcasing instrumentals); and "Radio Gold".
- Beat Goes Public: Rare and Classic Funk
- Big Beat: 1960s Rock 'n' Roll and Pop
- Globe Style: World Music
- Kent Records: Motown, Northern Soul, Deep Soul
- Kicking Mule: Guitar Music (Stefan Grossman, Bob Brozman, Bert Jansch)
- Southbound Records: 1970s Soul and Funk (Millie Jackson, Fatback, Sylvester, Joe Simon)
- Westbound Records: Funk, Soul (Funkadelic, Ohio Players, Detroit Emeralds)

== Artists released by Ace Records ==
- Albert Washington
- Alex Chilton
- Arthur Alexander
- B.B. King
- Bernard Purdie
- Big Joe Louis & His Blues Kings
- Big Mama Thornton
- Big Town Playboys
- Bob Lind
- Bobby Freeman
- Booker T & The MGs
- Brenda Lee
- Brother Jack McDuff
- Buddy Guy
- Buffy Sainte-Marie
- Caesar Frazier
- Candi Staton
- Chet Baker
- Chuck Higgins
- Chuck Jackson
- Country Joe & The Fish
- Country Joe McDonald
- Dan Penn
- Dana Gillespie
- Darondo
- Darrow Fletcher
- Dean Friedman
- Detroit Emeralds
- Dion DiMucci
- Doc Watson
- Don Julian & The Larks
- Donna Hightower (via RPM)
- Doris Duke
- Dyke and the Blazers
- Eddie Cochran
- Eric Andersen
- Etta James
- Fantastic Four
- Fatback Band
- Fats Domino
- Flora Purim
- Freddy King
- Funk Inc
- Funkadelic
- Goldie and the Gingerbreads
- Hadda Brooks
- Hop Wilson
- Ian & Sylvia
- Ian Tyson
- Idris Muhammad
- Ike Turner
- Irma Thomas
- Isaac Hayes
- Ivan "Boogaloo Joe" Jones
- Ivory Joe Hunter
- Jackie Day
- Jackie DeShannon
- Jackie Lee
- George Jackson
- James Carr
- Jeanette
- Jean Jacques Perrey
- Jerry Cole
- Jerry Jeff Walker
- Jerry Lee Lewis
- Jesse Belvin
- Jimmy Gilmer
- Jimmy Hughes
- Jimmy Lewis
- Jimmy Rushing
- Jimmy Witherspoon
- Joan Baez
- Joe Houston
- Joe Simon
- Joe Tex
- John Fahey
- John P. Hammond
- John Lee Hooker
- Johnnie Taylor
- Johnny "Guitar" Watson
- Johnny Moped
- Johnny Otis
- Johnny Tillotson
- Junior Wells
- King Curtis
- Larry Coryell
- Larry Williams
- Lazy Lester
- Lee Hazlewood
- Liam Clancy
- Lightnin' Hopkins
- Lightnin' Slim
- Link Wray
- Little Milton
- Little Richard
- Little Willie John
- Little Willie Littlefield
- Lonnie Mack
- Lou Johnson
- Lowell Fulson
- Luther Ingram
- Makin' Time
- Maxine Brown
- Mel Powell
- Melvin Sparks
- Mike Bloomfield
- Millie Jackson
- Richard Fariña
- Mississippi John Hurt
- Mother Earth
- Motörhead
- Odetta
- Oregon
- Otis Redding
- Pee Wee Crayton
- Phil Ochs
- Pleasure
- Pucho & The Latin Soul Brothers
- Radio Stars
- Ramblin' Jack Elliott
- Reparata and the Delrons
- Richard Berry
- Ricky Nelson
- Rita & The Tiaras
- Robbie Basho
- Rocky Sharpe and the Replays
- Rory Brown
- Roy Hawkins
- Rufus Thomas
- S.O.U.L.
- Sam Cooke
- The Soul Stirrers
- Sam Dees
- Sandy Nelson
- Screaming Lord Sutch
- Side Effect
- Skip James
- Slim Harpo
- Smokey Hogg
- Sniff 'n' the Tears
- Sonny Phillips
- Spencer Wiggins
- Dusty Springfield
- Sylvester
- Takeshi Terauchi
- Terry Callier
- The "5" Royales
- The Belmonts
- The Bishops
- The Blackbyrds
- The Champs
- The Chocolate Watchband
- The Chordettes
- The Count Bishops
- The Country Gentlemen
- The Counts
- The Cramps
- The Damned
- The Delfonics
- The Everly Brothers
- The Fatback Band
- The Fireballs
- The Fugs
- The Ikettes
- The Impressions
- The James Taylor Quartet
- The Mad Lads
- The Manhattans
- The Meteors
- The Milkshakes
- The Newbeats
- The Ohio Players
- The Ovations
- The Pazant Brothers
- The Platters
- The Prisoners
- The Radiators from Space
- The Rationals
- The Roommates
- The Rumblers
- The Seeds
- The Shirelles
- The Solarflares
- The Sonics
- The Soul Children
- The Standells
- The Stanley Brothers
- The Staple Singers
- The String-A-Longs
- The Textones
- The Two Things in One
- The Ventures
- The Wailers
- The Weavers
- The Wheels
- The Zombies
- Tom Paxton
- U.S. Music With Funkadelic
- Walter Jackson
- Wanda Jackson
- Whirlwind
- William Bell
- Willie Egan
- Willy DeVille
- Wynonie Harris

== See also ==
- Lists of record labels
- World music
