= The Gorillas =

English rock band

- Also known as: The Hammersmith Gorillas
- Origin: Hammersmith, London, England
- Genres: Pub rock; proto-punk; glam punk
- Years active: 1972–1981
- Labels: Penny Farthing; Chiswick; Raw
- Members: Jesse Hector; Alan Butler; Gary Anderson; Matt McIntyre; Jimmy Knight; Chris Townson (session drummer only)

The Gorillas (originally named The Hammersmith Gorillas) were an English rock group from Hammersmith, London, formed in 1972 and fronted by Jesse Hector, that played high energy rock music.

== History ==
Jesse Hector (born 17 July 1947, Kilburn, London, died 6 May 2026) played in bands from the age of 11, first the Sun Records influenced Rock and Roll Trio between 1959 and 1961, and then the R&B influenced band the Cravattes between 1962 and 1964. Cravattes bassist Adrian Stambach joined mod outfit the Clique in 1963. Jesse then reformed the Rock and Roll Trio (1966–1967) before starting two more short-lived bands, the Way of Life (1967) and the Mod Section (1968) and went on to form the proto-punk band Crushed Butler in 1969 with drummer Darryl Read and bassist Allen Butler. After a brief flirtation with EMI Records, Dick James Music, and Decca Records the band was renamed Tiger in autumn 1970, until Darryl left to join the glam rock group Dizzy after Tiger disbanded, then Hector with the addition of new drummer Gary Anderson and bassist Vic Allen changed name again to Helter Skelter in 1971. With the addition of bassist Allen Butler (who also had been one of a number of different bass players that passed through the Crushed Butler various lineups) the band became the Hammersmith Gorillas in 1972 taking their name from London's pro-Castro activist group the Hammersmith Guerillas.

The band's debut release was a cover version of the Kinks' "You Really Got Me" on the Penny Farthing label, produced by Larry Page, and timed to coincide with the tenth anniversary of the original release. They then signed to Chiswick Records and recorded two singles for the label with session drummers Chris Townson playing on the first single and Matt McIntyre playing on the second single for the label. With Gary Anderson back on drums the band began to build a loyal fanbase before moving on to Raw Records. In 1976, they played at the Mont-de-Marsan Punk Festival in the south of France along with the Damned and Eddie and the Hot Rods. After two more singles in 1978, the band's debut (and only) studio album was issued, Message to the World.

Hector was noted for his extravagant sideburns, and was a keen self-publicist, declaring the Gorillas to be "the future of rock music". He was influenced by several dead rock stars, and several tracks on the band's album were performed in the style of his heroes, including a cover of Jimi Hendrix's "Foxy Lady" and "Going Fishing" performed in the style of Marc Bolan. They returned to Chiswick in 1981 for the "Move It" single with Jimmy Knight appearing on bass, before splitting up after Alan Butler died from injuries sustained in a horse riding accident. Hector continued to regularly perform live around London, working with a new band, Jesse Hector & The Sound, in the early 1990s, with bassist Kevin White and drummer Gilles Baillarguet. The band issued a single in 1991, "Leavin' Town" on the Clawfist label. When the group split in 1993, Hector assembled a new band, the Gatecrashers, named after a Gorillas single, contributing to several retro-garage rock compilations and releasing an EP in 2000, Keep on Moving.

Later Hector worked as a cleaner at the Hackney Empire theatre and the Royal Horticultural Society, and was the subject of a documentary film in 2008, A Message To The World, directed by Caroline Catz, which was shown as part of the Raindance festival, and at the Barbican as part of its "Pop Mavericks" season.

Hector died from a heart attack on 6 May 2026, at the age of 78.

== Discography ==
=== Singles ===
- "You Really Got Me" (1974) Penny Farthing (as the Hammersmith Gorillas)
- "She's My Gal" (1976) Chiswick
- "Gatecrasher" (1976) Chiswick
- "You Really Got Me" (1977) Raw
- "It's My Life" (1978) Raw
- "Message to the World" (1978) Raw
- "Move It" (1981) Chiswick

=== Albums ===
- Message to the World (1978) Raw (reissued with bonus tracks, 1998, Damaged Goods)
- Gorilla Got Me (1999) Big Beat (credited to the Hammersmith Gorillas)

Gorillas tracks are also included on the Jesse Hector retrospective collection Gorilla Garage: The Jesse Hector Story (2005) RPM Records.

Crushed Butler's recordings were compiled by Darryl Read on the Uncrushed album in 2005 by RPM Records.
