= Daylight Robbery (1964 film) =

1964 British film by Michael Truman

- Still from the film
- Directed by: Michael Truman
- Screenplay by: Dermot Quinn
- Based on: an idea by Frank Wells
- Produced by: John Davis
- Starring: Janet Munro; Gordon Jackson; Zena Walker
- Cinematography: Geoffrey Faithfull
- Edited by: Peter Weatherley
- Music by: Tristram Cary
- Production company: Viewfinder Film Productions
- Distributed by: Children's Film Foundation
- Release date: December 1964 (UK)
- Running time: 57 minutes
- Country: United Kingdom
- Language: English

Daylight Robbery is a 1964 British film directed by Michael Truman and starring Janet Munro, Gordon Jackson and Zena Walker. It was written by Dermot Quinn and distributed by the Children's Film Foundation. Its plot concerns a group of kids who foil bank robbers.

== Plot ==
Three children, Trudy, Janet and Kirk, visit a department store. They are followed by Trudy, whose mother has forbidden her to play with them. As a prank, and to shock Trudy, Kirk steals a battery, although he intends to return it later. The three children get locked in the store and in their attempt to escape end up at the building site next door, where they are spotted by a man, part of a bank robbery gang, and imprisoned by him. Trudy goes in search of the children, rescues them and alerts the police.

== Cast ==
- Trudy Moors as Trudy
- Janet Hannington as Janet
- Kirk Martin as Kirk
- Darryl Read as Darryl
- Doug Robinson as gangster (credited as Douglas Robinson)
- John Trenaman as gangster
- Gordon Jackson as police sergeant
- Janet Munro
- Zena Walker
- Patricia Burke
- James Villiers
- Norman Rossington
- Ronald Fraser

== Critical reception ==
The Monthly Film Bulletin wrote: "After a leisurely opening, action takes over with excitement atop an uncompleted building, pursuits in a lift up and down ladders, and dizzy heights to add to the tension. But despite all the coming and going, the narrative suffers from a certain monotony, to which the lack of variety in settings probably contributes. The children versus bank robbers theme, and the thrills contained in the best moments, may entertain the audiences for whom it is intended, but as a whole it does not impress as being among the best of the Foundation's enterprises i"

TV Guide called it an "Okay children's film with a surprisingly talented adult cast."
