= Crushed Butler =

British rock band

Background information
- Also known as: Tiger; Helter Skelter; Hammersmith Gorillas; Gorillas
- Origin: London, England
- Genres: Proto-punk; hard rock
- Years active: 1969–1971
- Past members: Jesse Hector; Alan Butler; Darryl Read; Barry Wyles

Crushed Butler were a British rock band that existed between 1969 and 1971. According to 2008's Pretty Vacant: A History of UK Punk, the band "was, in many ways, Britain's first proto-punk band." Band members went on to form Darryl Read's Beat Existentialists and The Gorillas, as well as pursue solo careers.

== History ==
Crushed Butler formed in 1969 with a line-up of Jesse Hector (guitar, vocals), Alan Butler (bass guitar) and Darryl Read (drums). They initially played cover versions of other bands' songs, before writing their own original material. They dressed with ripped slash-neck T-shirts, studded belts and straight legged Levi jeans, and their aggressive and energetic live performances, blew many a name top act of the stage, from the Lyceum to the Guildford Civic – they were futuristic and a group to be reckoned with.

The band auditioned and recorded for several record labels including EMI and Decca, but failed to secure a deal. For their 1970 session for EMI, they were only allowed to record their own "Factory Grime" song after recording producer Roger Ferris' choice, "Love Is All Around Me". The label's aversion to "Factory Grime" saw them lose interest in the band.

In early 1971, the band changed their name to Tiger, and the line-up also changed to include Barry Mitchell, formerly a member of an early version of Queen. As Tiger they were managed by Neil Christian of The Crusaders, and Arthur Anderson joined the band on bass guitar. However, they still were unable to secure a record deal and the band split up in late 1971 when Read took up a job as a songwriter at Track Records.

Hector and Butler continued as Helter-Skelter and went on to form The Hammersmith Gorillas (later shortened to The Gorillas), while Read pursued a solo career, as well as working as an actor. Read's works included three albums (Beat Existentialist (1991) and Freshly Dug (1999) with Ray Manzarek and Bleeding Paradise in 2007. Read was killed in a motorcycle accident in June 2013 in Thailand.

Crushed Butler's recordings were eventually released in 1998 by Dig The Fuzz Records on the Uncrushed album.

== Discography ==
=== Singles ===
- "It's My Life" b/w "My Son's Alive" (2010) vinyl single Windian Records USA

=== Albums ===
- Uncrushed (1998) 'First Punks from the British Underground 1969–1971', Dig the Fuzz records – (first release on 10 inch vinyl)
- Uncrushed (2005), RPM records – reissued as Uncrushed: First Punks from the British Underground 1969–1971 CD album (bonus track)
- Uncrushed (2005), Madstar Records Germany – reissue CDBABY digital distribution
- Uncrushed (2009) Radio Heart Beat Records (with new bonus track on 12" vinyl)
- Uncrushed (2013) Last Years Youth Records Germany (with poster and extras on 10" vinyl)
