= Chiswick Records =

British record label

- Founded: 1975
- Founder: Ted Carroll; Roger Armstrong
- Defunct: 1983
- Distributor: EMI
- Genre: Power pop; pub rock; punk rock; new wave
- Country of origin: United Kingdom
- Location: London, England

Chiswick Records was a British independent record label. Established in 1975, Chiswick was the "first true 'indie' label to be established in Britain for nearly a decade". The label has been described as "significant" in the "punk era". It released some of the earliest records recorded by The Hammersmith Gorillas, The Count Bishops, Motörhead, Joe Strummer’s The 101ers, The Damned, Skrewdriver, Billy Bragg, Kirsty MacColl, and Shane MacGowan.

== History ==
The label was started by Ted Carroll and Roger Armstrong in 1975 as a subsidiary of Rock On Records. Shortly after Trevor Churchill joined, it was incorporated into Swift Records Ltd. Two years later it entered into a licensing deal with EMI. Subsidiary Ace Records was started in 1978, and Chiswick Records closed in 1983; its back catalogue is still owned by Ace Records Ltd.

The label released a number of sampler compilation albums showcasing their bands. These included Submarine Tracks & Fool's Gold (Chiswick Chartbusters Volume One) (1977) and Long Shots, Dead Certs And Odds On Favourites (Chiswick Chartbusters Volume Two) (1978).

== Artists released ==
- Albania
- The Damned
- Amazorblades
- The Count Bishops
- Edith Nylon
- Dr. Feelgood (Fast Women and Slow Horses album) (1982)
- Drug Addix (with Kirsty MacColl on backing vocals)
- The Gorillas
- Jakko
- Jeff Hill
- Johnny Moped
- Johnny & the Self Abusers
- Little Bob Story
- Matchbox
- Motörhead
- The Nipple Erectors
- The 101ers
- The Radiators from Space/The Radiators (Dublin)
- Radio Stars
- Riff Raff (with Billy Bragg)
- The Rings (with Twink)
- Sniff 'n' the Tears
- Rocky Sharpe and the Replays
- Skrewdriver
- T. V. Smith
- The Table
- Whirlwind

== See also ==
- Lists of record labels
