= Sounds of Unity and Love =

American soul music band of the 1970s

Sounds Of Unity and Love (S.O.U.L.)
- Origin: Cleveland, Ohio, United States
- Genres: Soul music
- Years active: 1971–1975
- Labels: Musicor
- Past members: Larry Hancock (vocals/organ) Bernard (Beloyd) Taylor (guitar); Lee Lovett (bass); Gus Hawkins (sax/flute); Paul Stubblefield (drums) Walter Winston (guitar until 1972)

Sounds Of Unity and Love (S.O.U.L.) was an American group founded in 1970 in Cleveland, Ohio, United States. Members were Lee Lovett (bass), Gus Hawkins (sax/flute), Paul Stubblefield (drums), and Walter Winston (guitar). Larry Hancock (vocals/organ) was added in 1971 and Bernard (Beloyd) Taylor (guitar) replaced Walter Winston in 1972.

In 1970, the group won the first prize of $1,000 in Cleveland a battle-of-the-bands contest sponsored by the May Department Stores Company, WHK radio station, and Musicor Records. They gained a recording contract with Musicor for their first single "Down In The Ghetto" (1971), produced by the TOP POP Recording Company 223 Kingston Avenue, Brooklyn, New York City.

Two years later, S.O.U.L. were back to New York to record What is It, an LP with seven tracks of covers of jazz and funk tunes, that jumped for two months on the Top 40 album spot on Billboard's soul album chart. The album was released in Europe just in the early 1990s on the BGP label.

S.O.U.L. released seven singles between 1971 and 1974 for Musicor, cracking the top 50 Hot R & B/Hip-Hop Songs chart in the summer of 1973. After a successful second LP, Can You Feel It?, the group split in 1975. Taylor moved to Los Angeles in 1973 with the group Mellow Thunder headed up by Melvin Ware, after which under new publishing and production contracts with Ware, he and Peter Cor, wrote 27 songs one of which was "Get Away". Wares' publishing company made the deal with Earth, Wind & Fire for "Getaway" in 1976 and his production company struck the recording deal with 20th Century Records. Hancock, also, moved to California and recorded for Decca Records including a duet with Alfie Silas; later he was part of the Platters. Gus Hawkins went back to college and worked as phlebotomist at the Cleveland Clinic before moving to Atlanta, Georgia. Lovett and Stubblefield continued to work in recording studios and labels. Sounds of Unity and Love was inducted into the inaugural class of the Official Rhythm & Blues Music Hall of Fame at Cleveland State University, in August 2013.

"Burning Spear" was sampled by the Danish group ETA in 1997 on their track "Casual Sub (Burning Spear)". The song peaked at number 54 in Australia.

== Albums ==
- What Is It (Musicor Records, MS 3195 (1971); BGP Records, BPGD 1087, 1990)
  - Tracks
    1. "Down in the Ghetto" (Francis)
    2. "Get Ready" (Robinson)
    3. "Burning Spear" (Evans)
    4. "Express Yourself" (Wright)
    5. "Soul" (Hawkins/Lovett)
    6. "Message from a Black Man" (Strong/Whitfield)
    7. "Memphis Underground" (Mann)
- Can You Feel It (Musicor Records, MS 3230 (1972); BGP Records, BPGD 1107)
  - Tracks
    1. "Can You Feel It" (Hancock/Hawkins/Lovett/Stubblefield/Winston)
    2. "Tell It Like It Is" (Hancock/Hawkins)
    3. "Do What's Never Your Want to Do" (Hancock/Hawkins/Lovett)
    4. "Peace of Mind" (Hancock/Hawkins/Lovett/Stubblefield/Winston)
    5. "My Cherie Amour" (Cosby/Moy/Wonder)
    6. "Love, Peace and Power" (Hancock/Hawkins/Lovett/Stubblefield/Winston)
    7. "To Mend a Broken Heart" (Hancock)
    8. "Sleeping Beauty" (Hawkins)
