= Radio Stars =

English punk rock band

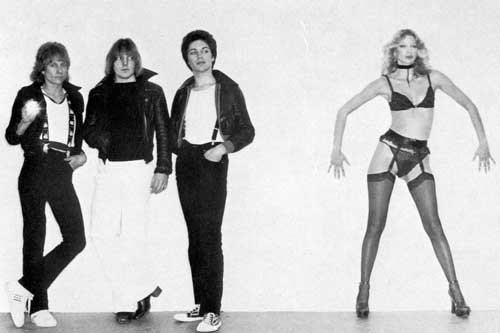
- From the "Dirty Pictures" session

Background information
- Origin: UK
- Genres: Punk rock
- Years active: 1977–1979; 1982–present
- Labels: Chiswick; Snat Records; Moonlight Records; Ace; Radiant Future
- Members: Andy Ellison; Martin Gordon; Ian MacLeod; Steve Parry
- Past members: Chris Townson; Jamie Crompton; Trevor White; Paul Simon
- Website: martingordon.de/radio-stars/

Radio Stars are an English punk rock band formed in early 1977. They released two albums and had one UK Top 40 single.

== Career ==
Radio Stars were formed by Sparks exile Martin Gordon (bass, songwriter) and also included ex-John's Children vocalist Andy Ellison and Ian MacLeod (guitar) in 1977, following the end of their under-achieving glam supergroup, Jet, the previous year.

The band signed to Chiswick Records and released their debut single, "Dirty Pictures", in April 1977. This was included on the Chiswick various artists sampler, Submarine Tracks & Fool's Gold (Chiswick Chartbusters Volume One) and was later covered by Germany's Die Toten Hosen on Learning English Lesson 1 which went gold in 1991. Later in 1977, "Dirty Pictures" appeared at number 26 in the NME's end-of-year critics' chart. In May 1977, the band both performed live for the first time and recorded the first of three sessions for John Peel at the BBC's Maida Vale Studios. Later adding Steve Parry on drums, the band's second release came in August. Playing "No Russians in Russia", the Radio Stars made their TV debut on Marc, Marc Bolan's show. The track later appeared on the 1978 Chiswick sampler Long Shots, Dead Certs And Odds On Favourites (Chiswick Chartbusters Volume Two). The performance was subsequently included in Columbia's DVD release Marc, featuring all six episodes of the Marc show.

In January 1978, the band entered the Top 40 of the UK Singles Chart, with "Nervous Wreck", backed with "Horrible Breath". The single charted for three weeks and peaked at No. 39 on 4 February. The band performed the song on BBC's Top of the Pops on 19 January 1978, with newsreader Kelly St John. The B-side, "Horrible Breath", was a song written by Marc Bolan from his time with John's Children.

The debut album, Songs for Swinging Lovers, named in reference to the Frank Sinatra album, appeared in December 1977. The band toured with Eddie and the Hot Rods and Squeeze, and played the Reading Festival in 1978. The Radio Stars released their second album in 1978, entitled Holiday Album. The album included their live favourite "Sex in Chains Blues", about the exploits of the so-called 'Mormon kidnapper' Joyce McKinney. The band undertook an extensive UK tour in 1978, which also featured Trevor White (a former member of Sparks) and Chris Gent (saxophone/backing vocals), but Gordon left soon after. The second album flopped, effectively ending the band, although a third album was recorded and shelved until 2021 when it came out as Broadcasting to the Nation. Ellison attempted to revive the band's name to little success in the 1980s and 1990s.

The group's recordings have been anthologised three times; on 1982's Two Minutes Mr. Smith by the Moonlight record label – Electric Light Orchestra's Hugh McDowell guested on cello – on 1992's (band-approved) Somewhere There's a Place for Us on Ace Records. In 2017 a 4-CD box set containing all the band's recordings, including a handful of singles, B-sides, BBC radio sessions and broadcasts and a specially-recorded revision of one of their greatest tunes, nowdubbed 'The Beast of Ankara', was released by Cherry Red/Anagram Records under the title of Thinking Inside the Box.

A one-off London concert performance took place in March 2008 in support of their live album (recorded in 1977/78) Something for the Weekend, released by Radiant Future Records that same month. The band played the Rebellion all-dayer at the Kentish Town Forum on Saturday 13 December 2008, alongside The Damned, Johnny Moped and Penetration. Their concert on 22 January 2010 (at the 100 Club in London) reprised their earlier tours as special guests of Eddie & the Hotrods.

Their 1978 single "The Real Me" appeared in the 2020 TV version of Nick Hornby's High Fidelity (Season 1, episode 1).

== Reviews ==
- "On the fringes of both the punk and new wave scene, the Radio Stars were at heart a quirky rock band built around Gordon's songs and Ellison's enthusiastic vocals".
- "A series of tongue-in-cheek singles, including "Dirty Pictures" and "Nervous Wreck", captured the quartet's brand of quirky pop / punk, but although the latter reached the fringes of the Top 40, the band were unable to achieve consistent success".
- "Radio Stars cut their debut album, provisionally titled Bowels Stuffed With Spleen. Squeamishly, Chiswick pleaded for something a little less unappetizing – the group replaced it with Songs For Swinging Lovers, but otherwise their monumental and, admittedly, tongue-in-cheek lack of taste was given full reign, via an ode to a recent serial rapist, "The Beast of Barnsley", a tribute to the just-deceased Elvis Presley, "Arthur is Dead Boring (Let's Rot)" and "Nervous Wreck", positively the finest pop song ever to feature a girlie chorus trilling "electro-encephalograph".
- The debut LP is "supreme power-pop punk with fiendishly witty lyrics, subject matter ranging from Greek restaurant menus ("Macaroni and Mice") to serial killers ("Beast of Barnsley"), and unrequited love ("Nervous Wreck"), nailed to some genuinely, memorably rocketing riffs. Rating: nine out of ten".
- "The Radio Stars presented a more refined blend of power pop / new wave bandwagoneering".
- "Radio Stars were a significant, but not essential, new wave band. They had a few good songs, but all their albums lacked sufficient consistency to become real classics".

== Line-up changes ==
- Original line-up: Andy Ellison – vocals; Ian MacLeod - guitar and backing vocals; Chris Townson - drums; Martin Gordon – bass, keyboards, songs, everything else.
- First EP: Paul Simon replaces Townson on drums.
- First album: Steve Parry replaces Simon on drums.
- Second album: Jamie Crompton replaces Parry on drums; Paul Jones guests on harmonica; Chris Gent plays sax; Graham Chapman provides a voiceover.
- Band breaks up in summer 1979, reforms briefly in 1982 for two performances, now including ELO's Hugh McDowell on cello.
- 2008: Band performs 32nd anniversary gig at London's Metro Club, and again at the Rebellion festival in London in December, with Stephen Budney playing the drums.
- 2010: Band performs 34th anniversary gig at 100 Club in London supporting Eddie and the Hotrods, with Smash on drums.

== Discography ==
=== Albums ===
- Songs for Swinging Lovers (December 1977: Chiswick Records WIK 5)
- Holiday Album (September 1978: Chiswick Records CWK 3001)
- Broadcasting To The Nation (November 2021: Easy Action EARS179)

=== Live albums ===
- Music For The Herd Of Herring (2001: Radiant Future Records RFVP001CD) - with Jet & John's Children
- Something For the Weekend (March 2008: Radiant Future Records RSVP010CD)

=== Compilations ===
- Two Minutes Mr. Smith (May 1982: Moonlight MNA 001)
- Somewhere There's A Place For Us (October 1992: Ace Records CDWIKD 107)
- Thinking Inside the Box (March 2017: Cherry Red Records CDPUNKBOX 162)

=== Appearances on various artist compilations (selected) ===
Listing of those various artist compilation albums mentioned in the text of the main article:

- "Dirty Pictures" featured on the Submarine Tracks & Fool's Gold (Chiswick Chartbusters Volume One) sampler album (1977: Chiswick Records)
- "No Russians in Russia" featured on the Long Shots, Dead Certs And Odds On Favourites (Chiswick Chartbusters Volume Two) sampler album (1978: Chiswick Records)

=== Singles ===
- "Dirty Pictures" / "Sail Away" (April 1977: Chiswick S 9)
- "Stop It E.P.": "No Russians in Russia" / "Box 29" / "Johnny Mekon" / "Sorry I’m Tied Up" (August 1977: Chiswick SW 17)
- "Nervous Wreck" / "Horrible Breath" (October 1977: Chiswick NS 23) Also available as a 12 inch single (NST 23) No. 39 UK Singles Chart
- "From A Rabbit" / "To A Beast" (April 1978: Chiswick NS 36)
- "Radio Stars" / "Accountancy Blues" (September 1978: Chiswick CHIS 102)
- "The Real Me" / "Good Personality" (January 1979: Chiswick CHIS 109)
- "Good Personality" / "Talking ‘Bout You" (May 1982: Moonlight MNS 001) (posthumous release)
- "My Mother Said" / "Two Minutes Mr. Smith" (September 1982: Snat Records ECG 1) (posthumous release)

== See also ==
- List of 1970s punk rock musicians
- List of Peel sessions
