= Radiant Future Records =

British independent record label

- Founded: 2000
- Founder: Martin Gordon
- Status: Active
- Distributors: The Orchard, Ace
- Official website: https://radiantfuture.eu

Radiant Future Records is an independent record label and home to one-time Sparks bassist Martin Gordon, Jet, Radio Stars, John's Children, the Blue Meanies and related artists. The label began operations in 2002 with the release of a live recording from Gordon's alumni Jet, Johns Children and Radio Stars, and releases one or two albums per year with a focus upon 'clever twisted pop which rocks', to quote Rolling Stone magazine.

Recent releases include a live Radio Stars album from the 1970s and Gordon's six solo releases in the Mammal Trilogy series. Since then, it's been mammal-free all the way, culminating most recently in the audio documentary 'His Mother Was a Woman' (2025).

== Catalogue ==
Year of release	Title	Artist	Format	Notes	Catalogue number
2026	When I Was a Chump	Resident Chump & the Quiet Piggies	Single	Resident Chump emerges blinking and snorting into a gold-leaf pigsty, and has a tremendous time. Everybody is saying so, really the most tremendous. He doesn't do less than tremendous.	RF041-S
2025	His Mother Was a Woman	Martin Gordon	Album	In which the semantic confusion of Felon Don is rendered culturally valuable (as if it were possible).	RF040
2024	Obscure Singularities	Martin Gordon	Album	In which obscure (but singular) tunes from the past are recontextualised.	RF039
2024	Singular Obscurities	Martin Gordon	Album	In which singular (but obscure) tunes from the past are recontextualised.	RF038
2024	Mudbath	Martin Gordon	Single	In which Don the Felon declares his love for mud and honesty. OK, mud.	RF037-S
2024	A True Totalitarian	Martin Gordon	Single	In which Vlad the Impaler declares his unrequited love for men with bare chests and oiled wrestlers.	RF035-CD
2023	No Sweat	Martin Gordon	Single	In which Prince Andrew Pandrew declares his love for humanity and his inability to sweat.	RF036-S
2023	Greatest Sh!ts	Martin Gordon	Album	Comprising a round-up of leading fat frauds, tyrants and nincompoops.	RF035
2022	Booster	Martin Gordon	Single	In which Boris stuffs everybody and then has lunch.	RF033-S
2022	Dumber Than a Rock	Martin Gordon	Single	It's the Don, Brad and Mart show.	RF032-S
2022	Slawa Ukraini!	Martin Gordon	Single	Marking the invasion of the Ukraine.	RF034-S
2022	Another Words – the Phone Call	Martin Gordon	Album	Expanded version of the 'Another Words' Trump-Raffensperger phone call w/ original source material.	RF031
2021	Somewhere Over the Rainbow	Martin Gordon	Single	Instrumental. During the pandemic, words temporarily failed us.	RF030-S
2021	Another Words	Martin Gordon	Album	In which Bigly Felon Don calls someone up and requests that they find more votes for him - a setting of the Trump-Raffensperger phone call of 2021.	RF029CD
2021	All the Rage	Martin Gordon	Single	Everybody's doing it, apparently	RF028-S
2021	Something Extra for the Weekend	Martin Gordon	Album	Radio Stars live in 1977 expanded with additional unreleased studio tracks.	RF024
2020	Superior Jeans	Martin Gordon	Single	Our superiority is somehow connected to our trousers, say experts.	RF027-S
2020	COVIDiots	Martin Gordon	Single	German courts now explicitly allow the use of this expression.	RF026-S
2020	OMG	Martin Gordon	Album	Can you believe it? Instead of a world that's frugal, we gotta Google world.	RF025CD
2019	Will of the People	Martin Gordon	Single	Included a remix version.	RF024-S
2018	Thanks For All the Fish	Martin Gordon	Album	Second album of Post-Mammal Era.	RF023CD
2018	God's Not Great	Martin Gordon	Single	Well, it's what people are saying, apparently.	RF023-S
2016	Idiots	Martin Gordon	Single	A general reflection on things, and idiots.	RF022S
2016	Dump the Trump!	Martin Gordon	Single	Tomorrow today will be yesterday.	RF020S
2016	Modern Major General	Martin Gordon	Single	From the Gilbert Gordon and Sullivan album.	RF019-01SDL
2016	Gilbert Gordon & Sullivan	Martin Gordon	Album	First album of Post-Mammal Era: Gilbert and Sullivan covers.	RF019CD
2013	Words in Your Shell-Like	Martin Gordon	Book.	All lyrics to all Gordon's songs 1974-2016 (updated edition issued 2016)	RF018
2013	Exclude Me In	Martin Gordon	Album	Include Me Out demos.	RF017CD
2013	Include Me Out	Martin Gordon	Album	Sixth and final part of Mammal Trilogy, limited CD edition of 70 copies then download only.	RF016CD
2009	Time Gentlemen Please – Demos	Martin Gordon	Album	Limited CD edition of 100 copies, then download only.	RF014CD
2009	Time Gentlemen Please	Martin Gordon	Album	Fifth part of Mammal Trilogy.	RFVP013CD
2008	New Hope for the Dead	Mira	Album	Download only.	RF012
2008	Hello Boston!	Martin Gordon	Album	Live in 2007; included with first 1000 copies of 'Something for the Weekend' then download only.	RFVP011CD
2008	Something for the Weekend	Radio Stars	Album	Live in 1977.	RFVP010CD
2007	Pop Sensibility	Blue Meanies	Album	Download only.	RF004
2007	The World is Your Lobster	Martin Gordon	Album	Fourth part of Mammal Trilogy.	RFVP009CD
2006	How Am I Doing So Far?(compilation)	Martin Gordon	Album	Selected best-of Parts I – III with 4 bonus tracks.	RFVP008CD
2006	The Mammal Trilogy box set	Martin Gordon	Album	Limited edition box set of Parts I – III.	RFVP001BOXCD
2005	Companion Volume to 'God's on His Lunchbreak	Martin Gordon / Chris Townson	Book	Lyrics to the 'God' album, full-colour illustrations to each song by Chris Townson.	RF001B
2005	God's on His Lunchbreak	Martin Gordon	Album	Third part of Mammal Trilogy.	RFVP007CD
2004	The Joy of More Hogwash	Martin Gordon	Album	Second part of Mammal Trilogy.	RFVP006CD
2003	The Baboon in the Basement	Martin Gordon	Album	First part of Mammal Trilogy.	RFVP005CD
2001	More Light Than Shade	Jet	Album	Withdrawn.	RFVP003CD
2001	Jet	Jet	Album	Withdrawn.	RFVP002CD
2000	Music for the Herd of Herring	Johns' Children, Jet & Radio Stars	Album	Live in 2000.	RF001
