= The Count Bishops =

British rock band

- The Count Bishops in 1977

Background information
- Origin: London, England
- Genres: Rock, garage punk, pub rock
- Years active: 1975–1980
- Labels: Chiswick, Lolita
- Past members: Mike Spenser; Zenon Hierowski; Brian Turrington; Bob Burgos; Rob Murly; Dave Rotchelle; Johnny Guitar; Dave Tice; Paul Balbi; Pat McMullan; Steve Lewins

The Count Bishops were a British rock band, formed in 1975 in London and which broke up in 1980. The Count Bishops had limited commercial success, but forged an important stylistic and chronological link between the root rhythm and blues band Dr. Feelgood and the proto punk sound of Eddie and the Hot Rods; together forming the foundation of the pub-rock scene, which influenced the emergence of punk rock. The group made history in England by releasing the first record from independent label Chiswick Records. They splintered following the death of guitarist Zenon DeFleur on 18 March 1979.

== History ==
The Count Bishops formed in spring 1975 when members of the group Chrome joined the American vocalist Mike Spenser. In July of that year, Spenser (née Scolnick) called fellow countryman Johnny Guitar from Paris for five days straight and finally convinced him to pack up two Les Pauls and fly to the UK and join up with Spenser and Zenon DeFleur (so named by Johnny after seeing him passed out on the floor at their first recording session). They found Steve Lewins (bass) and Australian drummer Paul Balbi – formerly of garage rock heavy rock outfit, Buffalo – within a few weeks. The new line-up recorded the next month at Pathway Studios with Barry Farmer at the desk and of these 13 tracks, four became the Speedball EP, the first release of Chiswick Records.

Shortly before the release (on Dutch label Dynamite) of the single "Taking it Easy" (In the UK "Train, Train" was the A side and Taking it Easy the B), Spenser left the band after an incident involving a glass door and his boot. Although not significant in the charts, "Train, Train" was covered by Billy Bragg on his album Talking with the Taxman about Poetry.

Johnny and Zen handled lead vocals for the next year, including on the Dutch release "Good Gear" on the Dynamite label. After recording the backing tracks for their first LP on Chiswick, they asked Dave Tice, a former bandmate of Balbi in Buffalo, to travel from Australia and join them as lead singer. With this lineup, the group finished recording its debut UK album, and toured heavily making a name for themselves and bringing to a new level their traditional influences of the 1960s: beat music (the Beatles, the Rolling Stones) and garage rock (the Standells, the Strangeloves).

For the rest of 1977, the Count Bishops toured continuously (including the support slot on the first Motörhead tour and John Cale's tour that year, as well as their own shows) and built a formidable army of fans, despite the fact that their image did not fit the mould of the then emerging punk rock movement. In the spring of 1978, they signed up for a live album with the participation of six groups of the Chiswick Records roster. The project was not fully realised, but the label released it as a mini-album called Live Bishops, reducing the band name to the Bishops. With this material (and a new bass player Pat McMullan, who replaced Steve Lewins) the Count Bishops toured extensively.

In 1978, two singles ("I Take What I Want" and a cover of The Strangeloves' "I Want Candy") led the Count Bishops to an appearance on the TV show Top of the Pops. A few days after the release of their album Cross Cuts, which had been a year and a half in production, Zenon Hierowski crashed his Aston Martin and died on 17 March 1979, and instead of the anticipated "breakthrough" the Bishops were forced to retrench. They toured with Blitz Krieg (of Blast Furnace fame) deputising for Zen. As the band returned from a Spanish festival, Paul Balbi (drums) was detained and deported to Australia. They carried on with Charlie Morgan (Tom Robinson Band, Elton John) on drums and just Johnny on guitar for some months, including a tour of Australia with Balbi, but Zen's death had taken much of the impetus away and they split up.

== Discography ==
=== EPs ===
- Speedball (1975)
- Rollin' with the Count Bishops (2006)

=== Albums ===
- The Count Bishops (1977)
- Good Gear (1977)
- Live (1978)
- Cross Cuts (1979)
- Speedball Plus 11 (1995)

=== Compilation albums ===
- The Best of the Count Bishops (1995)

== Reception ==
- "The Count Bishops were a fine, energetic, R&B-based band capable of kicking out a fierce racket of noise that sounded like a grimier version of seminal British R&B revivalists Dr. Feelgood." (John Dougan, Allmusic)
- "The sound of the Bishops in sensitive rockabilly mode has a swirling darkness and a restless rhythm, and it rattles by as hellbound as any classic blues locomotive." (Dave Thompson, Allmusic)
- "This solid, unpretentious debut album belongs in the home of every fan of English R&B from the Yardbirds to the Pretty Things to Dr. Feelgood." (John Dougan, Allmusic)
- "A laconic sneer, a greaseball grind, and one of the hottest guitarists of the age." (Dave Thompson, Allmusic)
