= Andy Ellison =

British musician and vocalist

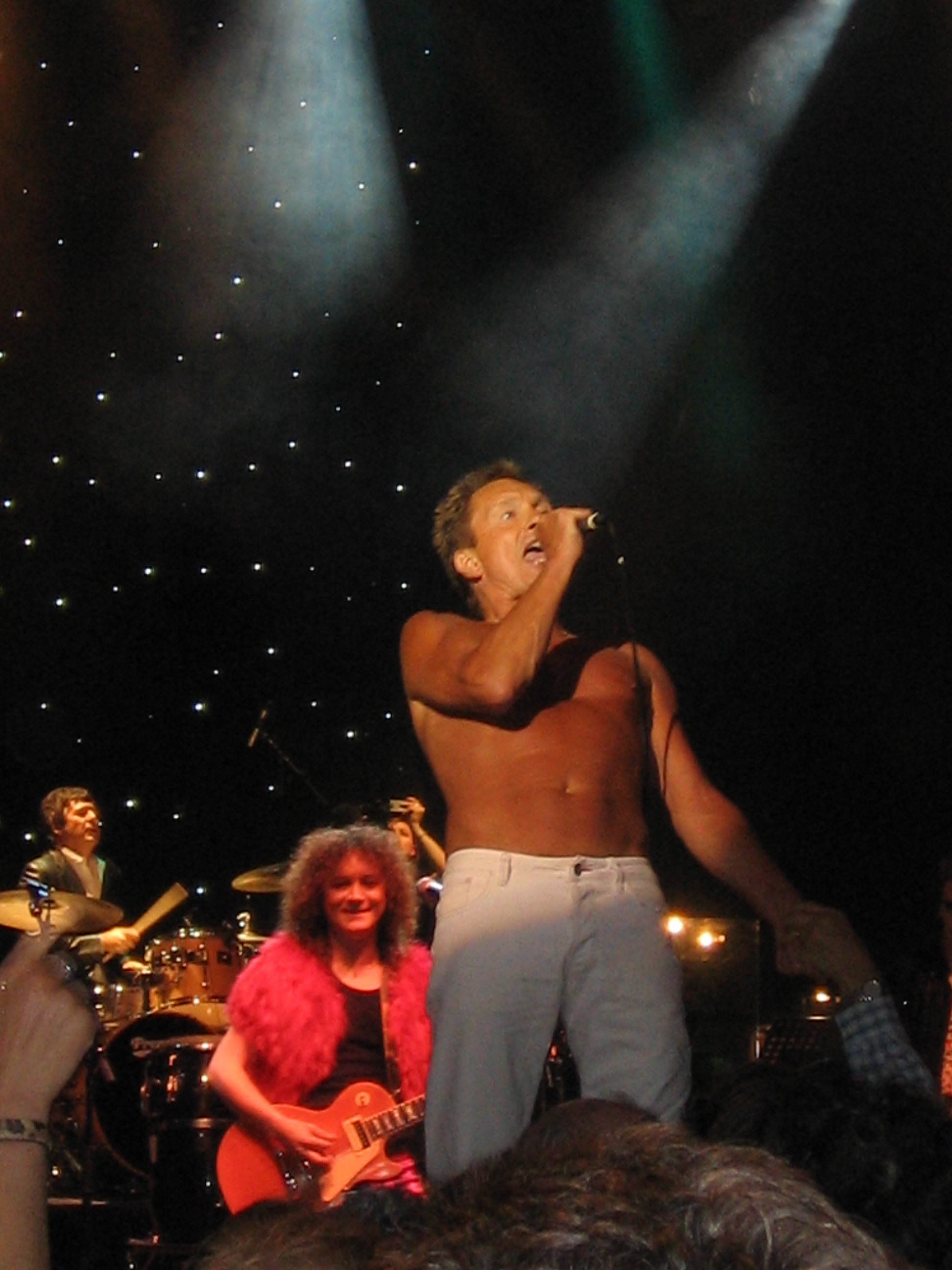
- Andy Ellison (front) at the Marc Bolan celebration concert

Background information
- Born: 5 July 1945 (age 81); Finchley, London, England
- Origin: Leatherhead, Surrey, England
- Genres: Rock music, Pop, Hard rock, new wave, Synthpop, Pop rock
- Years active: 1965–present
- Label: Track Records etc.
- Website: johnschildren.co.uk

Andrew Ellison (born 5 July 1945 in Finchley, London, England) is an English musician and vocalist, best known as the frontman in John's Children, Jet and Radio Stars.

== Biography ==
He attended an Outward Bound school in Box Hill, Surrey, where he met Chris Townson. Ellison and Townson co-founded the rock group John's Children.

John's Children also featured Marc Bolan and Chris Townson. A song sung by Ellison, "It's Been A Long Time", appears on the soundtrack to the film, Here We Go Round the Mulberry Bush. "It's Been A Long Time" also featured on the compilation album, Backtrack 1, a Track Records release featuring The Who and Jimi Hendrix amongst others.

Jet released an album on CBS Records in 1975, toured as support to Hunter-Ronson and then became Radio Stars, who had one UK Top 40 hit, "Nervous Wreck" in early 1978. It peaked at No. 39. The B-side to the single was a cover of Marc Bolan's "Horrible Breath", a John's Children staple.

== Discography ==
=== Solo albums ===
Title	Released
Cornflake Zoo	11 September 2006
Fourplay	2007
