= Playtime (disambiguation) =

Playtime is a 1967 film by Jacques Tati.

Playtime or Play Time may also refer to:

== Music ==
=== Albums ===
- Playtime (album), by Buddy Rich, 1961
- Playtime, by Akido, 2004
- Playtime, by Barbara Higbie and Teresa Trull, 1998
- Playtime, by David Hillyard and the Rocksteady 7, 1999
- Playtime, by DJ Neekola, co-produced by Rex Riot, 2010
- Playtime, by Eevee, 2012
- Playtime, by Michael Zentner, featuring Jon Catler, 1995
- PlayTime, by Nicole Theriault, 2001

=== Songs ===
- "Playtime", by Cindytalk from In This World, 1988
- "Playtime", by the Deviants from The Deviants 3, 1969
- "Playtime", by Heavenly from Carpe Diem, 2009
- "Playtime", by Khalil, 2014
- "Playtime", by Lukas Graham from Lukas Graham, 2015
- "Playtime", by Nightmares on Wax from A Word of Science: The First and Final Chapter, 1991
- "Playtime", by Yanni from Ethnicity, 2003

== Film and television ==
=== Films ===
- Playtime (2024 film), a 2024 Philippine suspense thriller film
- Playtime (2025 film), a 2025 Brazilian documentary film

=== Television ===
- Playtime (TV series), a German program
- Playtime, a segment of the Philippine program Art Jam

==== Episodes ====
- "Playtime" (Bookmice)
- "Playtime" (Pretty Little Liars), 2017
- "Playtime" (seaQuest DSV), 1994
- "Play Time" (Thomas & Friends), 2010
- "Playtime" (Zoboomafoo), 1999
- "Playtime" (Pocoyo), 2010

== Other uses ==
- Recess (break), or playtime, an activity period for schoolchildren
- Playtime, a 1998 art exhibition by Mall Nukke
- Playtime, a character from Baldi's Basics in Education and Learning
- Playtime, a fictional company in Poppy Playtime.

== See also ==
- Playtime Is Over (disambiguation)
- Workers' Playtime (disambiguation)
