= December 6 =

December 6 this year in various calendars
- Sunday, 6 December 2026
Akan	Monokwasi
Armenian	19 Kʿaloch 1476
Aztec	Tozoztontli 5, 6 Tecpatl
Babylonian	25 Arakhsamna, 2337 SE
Balinese pawukon	Menga, Kajeng, Menala, Paing, Maulu, Redite of Gumbreg, Yama, Erangan, Sri
Bengali	21 Ogrohayon, BS 1433
Chinese	Yang Wood Tiger・Star Mansion; Fire Horse Year, Month 10, Day 28 (Xiaoxue, 1 day until Daxue)
Common Era	6 December 2026 CE
Coptic	27 Hathor, AM 1743
Egyptian	24 Pharmuthi, 2775 NE
Ethiopian	27 H̱edār, 2019 Amätä Məhrät
French Republican	Décade II, Quintidi de Frimaire de l'Année 235 de la République
Gregorian	6 December, AD 2026
Hebrew	26 Kislev, AM 5787
Hindu	Svātī・Śobhana; Solar: 20 Mārgaśīrṣa, 1948 SE; Lunisolar: Trayodaśī, Kṛishna pakṣa of Kārtika, 2083 VE; Rāudra・5127 KY・1,872,915
Icelandic	Sunnudagur, 14 Ýlir 2026
Islamic	25 Jumada al-thani, AH 1448 (using tabular method)
ISO week date	2026-W49-7
Japanese	28 Kannazuki, Reiwa 8 (Shōsetsu, 1 day until Taisetsu)
Julian	23 November, AD 2026 (AM 7535)
Julian day	2461381
Korean	28 Dwaejidal, 4359 DE
Maya	13.0.14.2.18; 11 Mac, 6 Etznab
Roman	ante diem IX Kalendas Decembres, MMDCCLXXIX AUC
Solar Hijri	15 Azar, SH 1405
Tibetan	28 smin drug, me pho rta 2153 or 1772 or 1000

<<	December					>>
Su	Mo	Tu	We	Th	Fr	Sa
		1	2	3	4	5
6	7	8	9	10	11	12
13	14	15	16	17	18	19
20	21	22	23	24	25	26
27	28	29	30	31
2026

December 6 in recent years
2025 (Saturday)
2024 (Friday)
2023 (Wednesday)
2022 (Tuesday)
2021 (Monday)
2020 (Sunday)
2019 (Friday)
2018 (Thursday)
2017 (Wednesday)
2016 (Tuesday)

December 6 is the 340th day of the year (341st in leap years) in the Gregorian calendar; 25 days remain until the end of the year.

== Events ==
=== Pre-1600 ===
- 1060 – Béla I is crowned king of Hungary.
- 1240 – Mongol invasion of Rus': Kyiv, defended by Voivode Dmytro, falls to the Mongols under Batu Khan.
- 1492 – After exploring the island of Cuba (which he had mistaken for Japan) for gold, Christopher Columbus lands on an island he names Hispaniola.
- 1534 – The city of Quito in Ecuador is founded by Spanish settlers led by Sebastián de Belalcázar.

=== 1601–1900 ===
- 1648 – Pride's Purge removes royalist sympathizers from Parliament so that the High Court of Justice could put the King on trial.
- 1745 – Charles Edward Stuart's army begins retreat during the second Jacobite Rising.
- 1790 – The U.S. Congress moves from New York City to Philadelphia.
- 1803 – Five French warships attempting to escape the Royal Naval blockade of Saint-Domingue are all seized by British warships, signifying the end of the Haitian Revolution.
- 1865 – Georgia ratifies the 13th Amendment to the U.S. Constitution.
- 1882 – Transit of Venus, second and last of the 19th century.
- 1884 – The Washington Monument in Washington, D.C., is completed.
- 1897 – London becomes the world's first city to host licensed taxicabs.

=== 1901–present ===
- 1904 – Theodore Roosevelt articulated his "Corollary" to the Monroe Doctrine, stating that the U.S. would intervene in the Western Hemisphere should Latin American governments prove incapable or unstable.
- 1907 – A coal mine explosion at Monongah, West Virginia, kills 362 workers.
- 1912 – The Nefertiti Bust is discovered.
- 1916 – World War I: The Central Powers capture Bucharest.
- 1917 – Finland declares independence from the Russian Empire.
- 1917 – Halifax Explosion: A munitions explosion near Halifax, Nova Scotia kills more than 1,900 people in the largest artificial explosion up to that time.
- 1917 – World War I: USS Jacob Jones is the first American destroyer to be sunk by enemy action when it is torpedoed by German submarine SM U-53.
- 1921 – The Anglo-Irish Treaty is signed in London by British and Irish representatives.
- 1922 – Ireland is partitioned, with Northern Ireland and the Irish Free State coming into existence, one year to the day after the signing of the Anglo-Irish Treaty.
- 1928 – The government of Colombia sends military forces to suppress a month-long strike by United Fruit Company workers, resulting in an unknown number of deaths.
- 1933 – In United States v. One Book Called Ulysses Judge John M. Woolsey rules that James Joyce's novel Ulysses is not obscene despite coarse language and sexual content, a leading decision affirming free expression.
- 1939 – Winter War: The Red Army's advance on the Karelian Isthmus is stopped by Finns at the Mannerheim Line during the Battle of Taipale.
- 1941 – World War II: Camp X opens in Canada to begin training Allied secret agents for the war.
- 1956 – A violent water polo match between Hungary and the USSR takes place during the 1956 Summer Olympics in Melbourne, against the backdrop of the Hungarian Revolution of 1956.
- 1957 – Project Vanguard: A launchpad explosion of Vanguard TV3 thwarts the first United States attempt to launch a satellite into Earth orbit.
- 1967 – Adrian Kantrowitz performs the first human heart transplant in the United States.
- 1969 – Altamont Free Concert: At a free concert performed by the Rolling Stones, eighteen-year old Meredith Hunter is stabbed to death by Hells Angels security guards.
- 1971 – Pakistan severs diplomatic relations with India, initiating the Indo-Pakistani War of 1971.
- 1973 – The Twenty-fifth Amendment: The United States House of Representatives votes 387–35 to confirm Gerald Ford as Vice President of the United States. (On November 27, the Senate confirmed him 92–3.)
- 1975 – The Troubles: Fleeing from the police, a Provisional IRA unit takes a British couple hostage in their flat on Balcombe Street, London, beginning a six-day siege.
- 1977 – South Africa grants independence to Bophuthatswana, although it is not recognized by any other country.
- 1978 – Spain ratifies the Spanish Constitution of 1978 in a referendum.
- 1982 – The Troubles: The Irish National Liberation Army bombs a pub frequented by British soldiers in Ballykelly, Northern Ireland, killing eleven soldiers and six civilians.
- 1989 – The École Polytechnique massacre (or Montreal Massacre): Marc Lépine, an anti-feminist gunman, murders 14 young women at the École Polytechnique in Montreal.
- 1990 – A military jet of the Italian Air Force, abandoned by its pilot after an on-board fire, crashed into a high school near Bologna, Italy, killing 12 students and injuring 88 other people.
- 1991 – Yugoslav Wars: In Croatia, forces of the Serb-dominated Yugoslav People's Army (JNA) heaviest bombardment of Dubrovnik during a siege of seven months.
- 1992 – The Babri Masjid in Ayodhya, India, is demolished, leading to widespread riots causing the death of over 1,500 people.
- 1995 – The United States Food and Drug Administration approves Saquinavir, the first protease inhibitor to treat HIV/AIDS. Within 2 years of its approval, annual deaths from AIDS in the United States fall from over 50,000 to approximately 18,000.
- 1998 – in Venezuela, Hugo Chávez is victorious in presidential elections.
- 1999 – A&M Records, Inc. v. Napster, Inc.: The Recording Industry Association of America sues the peer-to-peer file-sharing service Napster, alleging copyright infringement.
- 2005 – An Iranian Air Force C-130 military transport aircraft crashes into a ten-floor apartment building in a residential area of Tehran, killing all 94 on board and 12 more on the ground.
- 2006 – NASA reveals photographs taken by Mars Global Surveyor suggesting the presence of liquid water on Mars.
- 2015 – Venezuelan parliamentary election: For the first time in 17 years, the United Socialist Party of Venezuela loses its majority in parliament.
- 2017 – Donald Trump's administration officially announces the recognition of Jerusalem as the capital of Israel.

== Births ==
=== Pre-1600 ===
- 846 – Hasan al-Askari, Arabian 11th of the Twelve Imams (died 874)
- 1285 – Ferdinand IV of Castile (died 1312)
- 1421 – Henry VI of England (died 1471)
- 1478 – Baldassare Castiglione, Italian courtier, diplomat, and author (died 1529)
- 1520 – Barbara Radziwiłł, queen of Poland (died 1551)
- 1545 – Janus Dousa, Dutch historian and noble (died 1604)
- 1586 – Niccolò Zucchi, Italian astronomer and physicist (died 1670)
- 1592 – William Cavendish, 1st Duke of Newcastle (died 1676)

=== 1601–1900 ===
- 1608 – George Monck, 1st Duke of Albemarle, English general and politician, Lord Lieutenant of Ireland (died 1670)
- 1637 – Edmund Andros, English courtier and politician, 4th Colonial Governor of New York (died 1714)
- 1640 – Claude Fleury, French historian and author (died 1723)
- 1645 – Maria de Dominici, Maltese sculptor and painter (died 1703)
- 1685 – Marie Adélaïde of Savoy (died 1712)
- 1721 – Guillaume-Chrétien de Lamoignon de Malesherbes, French minister and politician (died 1794)
- 1721 – James Elphinston, Scottish philologist and linguist (died 1809)
- 1732 – Warren Hastings, British colonial administrator of India (died 1818)
- 1752 – Gabriel Duvall, American jurist and politician (died 1844)
- 1778 – Joseph Louis Gay-Lussac, French physicist and chemist (died 1850)
- 1792 – William II of the Netherlands (died 1849)
- 1803 – Maria Josepha Amalia of Saxony (died 1829)
- 1805 – Richard Hanson, English-Australian politician, 4th Premier of South Australia (died 1876)
- 1812 – Robert Spear Hudson, English businessman and philanthropist (died 1884)
- 1823 – Max Müller, German-English philologist and orientalist (died 1900)
- 1827 – William Arnott, Australian biscuit manufacturer and founder of Arnott's Biscuits (died 1901)
- 1833 – John S. Mosby, American colonel (died 1916)
- 1835 – Wilhelm Rudolph Fittig, German chemist (died 1910)
- 1841 – Frédéric Bazille, French painter and soldier (died 1870)
- 1848 – Johann Palisa, Austrian astronomer (died 1925)
- 1849 – August von Mackensen, German field marshal (died 1945)
- 1853 – Hans Molisch, Czech-Austrian botanist and academic (died 1937)
- 1853 – Haraprasad Shastri, Indian historian and scholar (died 1931)
- 1863 – Charles Martin Hall, American chemist and engineer (died 1914)
- 1864 – William S. Hart, American actor, director, producer, and screenwriter (died 1946)
- 1875 – Albert Bond Lambert, American golfer and pilot (died 1946)
- 1875 – Evelyn Underhill, English mystic and author (died 1941)
- 1876 – Fred Duesenberg, German-American businessman, co-founded the Duesenberg Automobile & Motors Company (died 1932)
- 1878 – Elvia Carrillo Puerto, Mexican politician (died 1968)
- 1882 – Warren Bardsley, Australian cricketer (died 1954)
- 1884 – Cornelia Meigs, American author, playwright, and academic (died 1973)
- 1886 – Joyce Kilmer, American soldier, author, and poet (died 1918)
- 1887 – Lynn Fontanne, British actress (died 1983)
- 1887 – Joseph Lamb, American pianist and composer (died 1960)
- 1888 – Will Hay, English actor, director, and screenwriter (died 1949)
- 1890 – Dion Fortune, Welsh occultist, psychologist, and author (died 1946)
- 1890 – Yoshio Nishina, Japanese physicist and academic (died 1951)
- 1890 – Rudolf Schlichter, German painter and illustrator (died 1955)
- 1892 – Osbert Sitwell, English-Italian captain, poet, and author (died 1969)
- 1893 – Homer N. Wallin, American admiral (died 1984)
- 1893 – Sylvia Townsend Warner, English author and poet (died 1978)
- 1896 – Ira Gershwin, American songwriter (died 1983)
- 1898 – Alfred Eisenstaedt, German-American photographer and journalist (died 1995)
- 1898 – John McDonald, Scottish-Australian politician, 37th Premier of Victoria (died 1977)
- 1898 – Gunnar Myrdal, Swedish sociologist and economist, Nobel Prize laureate (died 1987)
- 1898 – Winifred Lenihan, American actress, writer, and director (died 1964)
- 1900 – Agnes Moorehead, American actress (died 1974)

=== 1901–present ===
- 1901 – Eliot Porter, American photographer and academic (died 1990)
- 1903 – Tony Lazzeri, American baseball player and manager (died 1946)
- 1904 – Ève Curie, French-American journalist and pianist (died 2007)
- 1905 – Elizabeth Yates, American journalist and author (died 2001)
- 1907 – John Barkley Rosser Sr., American logician (died 1989)
- 1908 – Herta Freitag, Austrian-American mathematician (died 2000)
- 1908 – Pierre Graber, Swiss lawyer and politician, 69th President of the Swiss Confederation (died 2003)
- 1908 – Baby Face Nelson, American gangster (died 1934)
- 1908 – Miklós Szabó, Hungarian runner (died 2000)
- 1909 – Rulon Jeffs, American religious leader (died 2002)
- 1909 – Alan McGilvray, Australian cricketer and sportscaster (died 1996)
- 1910 – David M. Potter, American historian, author, and academic (died 1971)
- 1912 – Eleanor Holm, American swimmer and actress (died 2004)
- 1913 – Karl Haas, German-American pianist, conductor, and radio host (died 2005)
- 1914 – Cyril Washbrook, English cricketer (died 1999)
- 1916 – Yekaterina Budanova, Russian captain and pilot (died 1943)
- 1916 – Kristján Eldjárn, Icelandic educator and politician, 3rd President of Iceland (died 1982)
- 1916 – Hugo Peretti, American songwriter and producer (died 1986)
- 1916 – Trisno Sumardjo, Indonesian writer, translator, and painter (died 1969)
- 1917 – Dean Hess, American minister and colonel (died 2015)
- 1917 – Kamal Jumblatt, Lebanese lawyer and politician (died 1977)
- 1917 – Irv Robbins, Canadian-American businessman, co-founded Baskin-Robbins (died 2008)
- 1918 – Tauba Biterman, Polish Holocaust survivor (died 2019)
- 1919 – Skippy Baxter, Canadian-American figure skater and coach (died 2012)
- 1919 – Paul de Man, Belgian-born philosopher, literary critic and theorist (died 1983)
- 1920 – Dave Brubeck, American pianist and composer (died 2012)
- 1920 – Peter Dimmock, English sportscaster and producer (died 2015)
- 1920 – George Porter, English chemist and academic, Nobel Prize laureate (died 2002)
- 1921 – Otto Graham, American football player and coach (died 2003)
- 1921 – Piero Piccioni, Italian lawyer, pianist, and composer (died 2004)
- 1922 – John Brunt, English captain, Victoria Cross recipient (died 1944)
- 1922 – Benjamin A. Gilman, American soldier and politician (died 2016)
- 1924 – Wally Cox, American actor (died 1973)
- 1927 – Jim Fuchs, American shot putter and discus thrower (died 2010)
- 1928 – Bobby Van, American actor, dancer, and singer (died 1980)
- 1929 – Philippe Bouvard, French journalist and radio host
- 1929 – Nikolaus Harnoncourt, German-Austrian cellist and conductor (died 2016)
- 1929 – Frank Springer, American comic book illustrator (died 2009)
- 1929 – Alain Tanner, Swiss director, producer, and screenwriter (died 2022)
- 1930 – Daniel Lisulo, Zambian banker and politician, 3rd Prime Minister of Zambia (died 2000)
- 1931 – Zeki Müren, Turkish singer-songwriter and actor (died 1996)
- 1932 – Kamleshwar, Indian author, screenwriter, and critic (died 2007)
- 1933 – Henryk Górecki, Polish composer and academic (died 2010)
- 1933 – Donald J. Kutyna, American general
- 1934 – Nick Bockwinkel, American wrestler, sportscaster, and actor (died 2015)
- 1935 – Jean Lapointe, Canadian actor, singer, and politician (died 2022)
- 1936 – Bill Ashton, English saxophonist and composer (died 2025)
- 1936 – Kenneth Copeland, American evangelist and author
- 1936 – David Ossman, American writer and comedian
- 1937 – Alberto Spencer, Ecuadorian-American soccer player (died 2006)
- 1938 – Patrick Bauchau, Belgian-American actor
- 1939 – Franco Carraro, Italian politician and sports administrator
- 1940 – Lawrence Bergman, Canadian lawyer and politician
- 1940 – Richard Edlund, American visual effects designer and cinematographer
- 1941 – Helen Cornelius, American country singer-songwriter and actress (died 2025)
- 1941 – Bruce Nauman, American sculptor and illustrator
- 1941 – Richard Speck, American murderer (died 1991)
- 1941 – Bill Thomas, American academic and politician
- 1942 – Peter Handke, Austrian author and playwright, Nobel Prize laureate
- 1942 – Robb Royer, American guitarist, keyboard player, and songwriter
- 1943 – Mike Smith, English singer-songwriter, keyboard player, and producer (died 2008)
- 1943 – Keith West, English rock singer-songwriter and music producer
- 1944 – Jonathan King, English singer-songwriter, record producer, music entrepreneur, television/radio presenter, and convicted sex offender
- 1945 – Shekhar Kapur, Indian director, producer, and screenwriter
- 1946 – Frankie Beverly, American soul/funk singer-songwriter, musician, and producer (died 2024)
- 1946 – Willy van der Kuijlen, Dutch footballer and manager (died 2021)
- 1947 – Lawrence Cannon, Canadian businessman and politician, 9th Canadian Minister of Foreign Affairs
- 1947 – Geoffrey Hinton, British-Canadian computer scientist, cognitive scientist, and cognitive psychologist, Nobel Prize laureate
- 1947 – Henk van Woerden, Dutch-South African painter and author (died 2005)
- 1947 – Miroslav Vitouš, Czech-American bassist and songwriter
- 1948 – Jean-Paul Ngoupandé, Central African politician, Prime Minister of the Central African Republic (died 2014)
- 1948 – Don Nickles, American businessman and politician
- 1948 – Keke Rosberg, Finnish racing driver
- 1948 – JoBeth Williams, American actress
- 1949 – Linda Barnes, American author, playwright, and educator
- 1949 – Linda Creed, American singer-songwriter (died 1986)
- 1949 – Doug Marlette, American author and cartoonist (died 2007)
- 1949 – Peter Willey, English cricketer and umpire
- 1950 – Guy Drut, French hurdler and politician
- 1950 – Joe Hisaishi, Japanese pianist, composer, and conductor
- 1950 – Helen Liddell, Baroness Liddell of Coatdyke, Scottish journalist and politician, Secretary of State for Scotland
- 1951 – Wendy Ellis Somes, English ballerina and producer
- 1951 – Maurice Hope, Caribbean-English boxer
- 1952 – Nicolas Bréhal, French author and critic (died 1999)
- 1952 – Craig Newmark, American computer programmer and entrepreneur; founded Craigslist
- 1952 – Shio Satō, Japanese illustrator (died 2010)
- 1953 – Sue Carroll, English journalist (died 2011)
- 1953 – Gary Goodman, Australian cricketer and coach
- 1953 – Geoff Hoon, English academic and politician, Minister of State for Europe
- 1953 – Tom Hulce, American actor
- 1953 – Masami Kurumada, Japanese author and illustrator
- 1954 – Nicola De Maria, Italian painter
- 1954 – Chris Stamey, American singer-songwriter, musician, and music producer
- 1955 – Anne Begg, Scottish educator and politician
- 1955 – Rick Buckler, English drummer, songwriter, and producer (died 2025)
- 1955 – Graeme Hughes, Australian cricketer, rugby league player, and sportscaster
- 1955 – Tony Woodcock, English footballer
- 1955 – Steven Wright, American actor, comedian, and screenwriter
- 1956 – Peter Buck, American guitarist, songwriter, and producer
- 1956 – Hans Kammerlander, Italian mountaineer and guide
- 1956 – Randy Rhoads, American guitarist, songwriter, and producer (died 1982)
- 1957 – Adrian Borland, English singer-songwriter, guitarist, and producer (died 1999)
- 1957 – Andrew Cuomo, American politician, 56th Governor of New York
- 1957 – Bill Hanzlik, American basketball player and coach
- 1958 – Nick Park, English animator, director, producer, and screenwriter
- 1959 – Deborah Estrin, American computer scientist and academic
- 1959 – Stephen Hepburn, English politician
- 1959 – Satoru Iwata, Japanese game programmer and businessman (died 2015)
- 1959 – Stephen Muggleton, English computer scientist and engineer
- 1960 – Masahiko Katsuya, Japanese journalist and photographer (died 2018)
- 1961 – David Lovering, American drummer
- 1961 – Jonathan Melvoin, American musician (died 1996)
- 1961 – Manuel Reuter, German race car driver
- 1962 – Janine Turner, American actress
- 1962 – Ben Watt, English singer-songwriter, musician, author, DJ, and radio presenter
- 1963 – Ulrich Thomsen, Danish actor and producer
- 1964 – Mall Nukke, Estonian painter
- 1965 – Gordon Durie, Scottish footballer and manager
- 1966 – Natascha Badmann, Swiss triathlete
- 1966 – Per-Ulrik Johansson, Swedish golfer
- 1967 – Judd Apatow, American director, producer, and screenwriter
- 1967 – Helen Greiner, American businesswoman and engineer
- 1967 – Arnaldo Mesa, Cuban boxer (died 2012)
- 1968 – Karl Ove Knausgård, Norwegian author
- 1968 – Ali Latifiyan, Iranian writer and political theorist
- 1968 – Akihiro Yano, Japanese baseball player
- 1969 – Mark Gardener, English rock musician
- 1969 – Torri Higginson, Canadian actress
- 1970 – Ulf Ekberg, Swedish singer-songwriter, keyboard player, and producer
- 1970 – Adrian Fenty, American lawyer and politician, 6th Mayor of the District of Columbia
- 1970 – Mark Reckless, English politician
- 1970 – Jeff Rouse, American swimmer
- 1971 – Craig Brewer, American director, producer, and screenwriter
- 1971 – José Contreras, Cuban baseball player
- 1971 – Richard Krajicek, Dutch tennis player
- 1971 – Naozumi Takahashi, Japanese singer and voice actor
- 1971 – Carole Thate, Dutch field hockey player
- 1971 – Ryan White, American activist (died 1990)
- 1972 – Ewan Birney, English scientist
- 1972 – Heather Mizeur, American lawyer and politician
- 1974 – Jens Pulver, American mixed martial artist and boxer
- 1974 – Nick Stajduhar, Canadian ice hockey player
- 1975 – Noel Clarke, English actor, director, and screenwriter
- 1975 – Adrian García Arias, Mexican footballer
- 1976 – Lindsay Price, American actress
- 1977 – Kevin Cash, American baseball player and manager
- 1977 – Andrew Flintoff, English cricketer, coach, and sportscaster
- 1977 – Paul McVeigh, Irish footballer
- 1978 – Chris Başak, American baseball player
- 1978 – Darrell Jackson, American football player
- 1978 – Adriana Moisés Pinto, Brazilian basketball player
- 1978 – Ramiro Pez, Argentine rugby player
- 1979 – Tim Cahill, Australian footballer
- 1980 – Danielle Downey, American golfer and coach (died 2014)
- 1980 – Steve Lovell, English footballer
- 1980 – Carlos Takam, Cameroonian-French boxer
- 1981 – Federico Balzaretti, Italian footballer
- 1982 – Ryan Carnes, American actor and producer
- 1982 – Alberto Contador, Spanish cyclist
- 1982 – Sean Ervine, Zimbabwean cricketer
- 1982 – Robbie Gould, American football player
- 1982 – Aaron Sandilands, Australian footballer
- 1982 – Susie Wolff, Scottish race car driver
- 1984 – Syndric Steptoe, American football player
- 1984 – Nora Kirkpatrick, American actress and musician
- 1984 – Princess Sofia, Duchess of Värmland
- 1985 – Shannon Bobbitt, American basketball player
- 1985 – Aristeidis Grigoriadis, Greek swimmer
- 1985 – R. P. Singh, Indian cricketer
- 1986 – Sean Edwards, English race car driver (died 2013)
- 1986 – Matt Niskanen, American ice hockey player
- 1988 – Adam Eaton, American baseball player
- 1988 – Ravindra Jadeja, Indian cricketer
- 1988 – Sandra Nurmsalu, Estonian singer and violinist
- 1988 – Nils Petersen, German footballer
- 1988 – Nobunaga Shimazaki, Japanese voice actor
- 1989 – Felix Schiller, German footballer
- 1990 – Tamira Paszek, Austrian tennis player
- 1991 – Rachel Jarry, Australian basketball player
- 1991 – Milica Mandić, Serbian taekwondo athlete
- 1991 – Coco Vandeweghe, American tennis player
- 1992 – Viktor Antipin, Russian ice hockey player
- 1992 – Britt Assombalonga, Congolese footballer
- 1992 – Johnny Manziel, American football player
- 1993 – Jasprit Bumrah, Indian cricketer
- 1993 – Elián González, Cuban technician, known for a child custody and immigration case held in 2000
- 1993 – Tautau Moga, Australian-Samoan rugby league player
- 1994 – Giannis Antetokounmpo, Greek-Nigerian basketball player
- 1994 – Wakatakakage Atsushi, Japanese sumo wrestler
- 1994 – Shreyas Iyer, Indian cricketer
- 1995 – A Boogie wit da Hoodie, American rapper and singer-songwriter
- 1996 – Davide Calabria, Italian footballer
- 1996 – Stefanie Scott, American actress and singer
- 1997 – Sabrina Ionescu, American basketball player
- 1998 – Angelīna Kučvaļska, Latvian figure skater
- 2003 – Olivia Onesti, French cyclist
- 2007 – Yoonchae Jeung, South Korean singer

== Deaths ==
=== Pre-1600 ===
- 343 – Saint Nicholas, Greek bishop and saint (born 270)
- 735 – Prince Toneri of Japan (born 676)
- 762 – Muhammad al-Nafs al-Zakiyya, Arab rebel leader (born 710)
- 1185 – Afonso I of Portugal (born 1109)
- 1305 – Maximus, Metropolitan of Kyiv
- 1306 – Roger Bigod, 5th Earl of Norfolk (born 1270)
- 1352 – Pope Clement VI (born 1291)
- 1562 – Jan van Scorel, Dutch painter (born 1495)

=== 1601–1900 ===
- 1616 – Ahmad Ibn al-Qadi, Moroccan writer, judge and mathematician (born 1552)
- 1618 – Jacques Davy Duperron, French cardinal (born 1556)
- 1658 – Baltasar Gracián, Spanish priest and author (born 1601)
- 1675 – John Lightfoot, English priest, scholar, and academic (born 1602)
- 1686 – Eleonora Gonzaga, Queen consort of Ferdinand III (born 1630)
- 1716 – Benedictus Buns, Dutch priest and composer (born 1642)
- 1718 – Nicholas Rowe, English poet and playwright (born 1674)
- 1746 – Lady Grizel Baillie, Scottish poet and songwriter (born 1665)
- 1771 – Giovanni Battista Morgagni, Italian anatomist and pathologist (born 1682)
- 1779 – Jean-Baptiste-Siméon Chardin, French painter (born 1699)
- 1788 – Jonathan Shipley, English bishop (born 1714)
- 1855 – William Swainson, English ornithologist and entomologist (born 1789)
- 1867 – Jean Pierre Flourens, French physiologist and academic (born 1794)
- 1868 – August Schleicher, German linguist and academic (born 1821)
- 1878 – Theodoros Vryzakis, Greek painter and educator (born 1814)
- 1879 – Erastus Brigham Bigelow, American businessman (born 1814)
- 1882 – Alfred Escher, Swiss businessman and politician, founded Credit Suisse (born 1819)
- 1882 – Anthony Trollope, English novelist, essayist, and short story writer (born 1815)
- 1889 – Jefferson Davis, American general and politician, President of the Confederate States of America (born 1808)
- 1892 – Werner von Siemens, German engineer and businessman, founded the Siemens Company (born 1816)

=== 1901–present ===
- 1918 – Alexander Dianin, Russian chemist (born 1851)
- 1921 – Said Halim Pasha, Ottoman politician, 280th Grand Vizier of the Ottoman Empire (born 1865)
- 1924 – Gene Stratton-Porter, American author and screenwriter (born 1863)
- 1945 – Edmund Dwyer-Gray, Irish-Australian politician, 29th Premier of Tasmania (born 1870)
- 1951 – Harold Ross, American journalist and publisher, founded The New Yorker (born 1892)
- 1955 – Honus Wagner, American baseball player and manager (born 1874)
- 1956 – B. R. Ambedkar, Indian economist and politician, 1st Indian Minister of Justice (born 1891)
- 1961 – Frantz Fanon, Martinique-French psychiatrist and author (born 1925)
- 1964 – Evert van Linge, Dutch footballer and architect (born 1895)
- 1972 – Janet Munro, English actress and singer (born 1934)
- 1974 – Nikolay Kuznetsov, Soviet naval officer (born 1904)
- 1976 – João Goulart, Brazilian lawyer and politician, 24th President of Brazil (born 1918)
- 1980 – Charles Deutsch, French engineer and businessman, co-founded DB (born 1911)
- 1982 – Jean-Marie Seroney, Kenyan activist and politician (born 1927)
- 1983 – Lucienne Boyer, French singer and actress (born 1903)
- 1983 – Gul Khan Nasir, Pakistani poet, historian, and politician (born 1914)
- 1985 – Burr Tillstrom, American actor and puppeteer (born 1917)
- 1985 – Burleigh Grimes, American baseball player and manager (born 1893)
- 1985 – Carroll Cole, American serial killer, arsonist, and cannibal (born 1938)
- 1988 – Roy Orbison, American singer-songwriter and guitarist (born 1936)
- 1989 – Frances Bavier, American actress (born 1902)
- 1989 – Sammy Fain, American pianist and composer (born 1902)
- 1989 – John Payne, American actor, singer, and producer (born 1912)
- 1990 – Pavlos Sidiropoulos, Greek singer-songwriter and guitarist (born 1948)
- 1990 – Tunku Abdul Rahman, Malaysian lawyer and politician, 1st Prime Minister of Malaysia (born 1903)
- 1991 – Mimi Smith, English nurse (born 1906)
- 1991 – Richard Stone, English economist and statistician, Nobel Prize laureate (born 1913)
- 1993 – Don Ameche, American actor (born 1908)
- 1994 – Heinz Baas, German footballer and manager (born 1922)
- 1994 – Gian Maria Volonté, Italian actor and director (born 1933)
- 1996 – Pete Rozelle, American businessman (born 1926)
- 1996 – Harry Babcock, American football player and first overall draft pick (born 1930)
- 1997 – Willy den Ouden, Dutch swimmer (born 1918)
- 1998 – César Baldaccini, French sculptor and educator (born 1921)
- 2000 – Werner Klemperer, German-American actor (born 1920)
- 2000 – Aziz Mian, Pakistani singer-songwriter and poet (born 1942)
- 2001 – Charles McClendon, American football player and coach (born 1923)
- 2002 – Philip Berrigan, American priest and activist (born 1923)
- 2003 – Carlos Manuel Arana Osorio, Guatemalan general and politician, President of Guatemala (born 1918)
- 2005 – Charly Gaul, Luxembourger cyclist (born 1932)
- 2005 – Devan Nair, Malaysian-Singaporean union leader and politician, 3rd President of Singapore (born 1923)
- 2005 – Danny Williams, South African singer (born 1942)
- 2005 – William P. Yarborough, American general (born 1912)
- 2006 – John Feeney, New Zealand director and producer (born 1922)
- 2010 – Mark Dailey, American-Canadian journalist and actor (born 1953)
- 2011 – Dobie Gray, American singer-songwriter and producer (born 1940)
- 2012 – Miguel Abia Biteo Boricó, Equatoguinean engineer and politician, Prime Minister of Equatorial Guinea (born 1961)
- 2012 – Jan Carew, Guyanese author, poet, and playwright (born 1920)
- 2012 – Jeffrey Koo Sr., Taiwanese banker and businessman (born 1933)
- 2012 – Huw Lloyd-Langton, English guitarist (born 1951)
- 2012 – Pedro Vaz, Uruguayan lawyer and politician, Minister of Foreign Affairs of Uruguay (born 1963)
- 2013 – Jean-Pierre Desthuilliers, French poet and critic (born 1939)
- 2013 – Stan Tracey, English pianist and composer (born 1926)
- 2013 – M. K. Turk, American basketball player and coach (born 1942)
- 2014 – Ralph H. Baer, German-American video game designer, created the Magnavox Odyssey (born 1922)
- 2014 – Jimmy Del Ray, American wrestler and manager (born 1962)
- 2014 – Fred Hawkins, American golfer (born 1923)
- 2014 – Luke Somers, English-American photographer and journalist (born 1981)
- 2015 – Ko Chun-hsiung, Taiwanese actor, director, and politician (born 1945)
- 2015 – Liu Juying, Chinese general and politician (born 1917)
- 2015 – Nicholas Smith, British actor (born 1934)
- 2016 – Peter Vaughan, British actor (born 1923)
- 2024 – Maggie Tabberer, Australian fashion model and television personality (born 1936)

== Holidays and observances ==
- Anniversary of the Founding of Quito (Ecuador)
- Armed Forces Day (Ukraine)
- Christian feast day:
  - Abraham of Kratia
  - Aemilianus (Roman Catholic Church)
  - Denise and companions
  - Blessed János Scheffler
  - María del Monte Carmelo Sallés y Barangueras
  - Nicholas of Myra, and its related observances:
    - Saint Nicholas Day, where Saint Nicholas/Santa Claus leaves little presents in children's shoes. (International)
  - December 6 (Eastern Orthodox liturgics)
- Constitution Day (Spain)
- Day of the Ministry of Communications and Information Technologies of Azerbaijan
- Independence Day, celebrates the independence of Finland from Russia in 1917.
- National Day of Remembrance and Action on Violence Against Women (Canada)
