= The Black Leather Jacket =

1985 book by Mick Farren

- Cover of The Black Leather Jacket
- Author: Mick Farren
- Language: English
- Subject: Leather jackets
- Publisher: Abbeville Press/Plexus Publishing
- Publication date: 1985
- Publication place: US
- Pages: 96
- ISBN: 0-89659-573-0
- OCLC: 234240265
- Dewey Decimal: 391/.1 19
- LC Class: GT615 .F36 1985

The Black Leather Jacket is a book written by English journalist and author Mick Farren published in 1985.

== Book ==
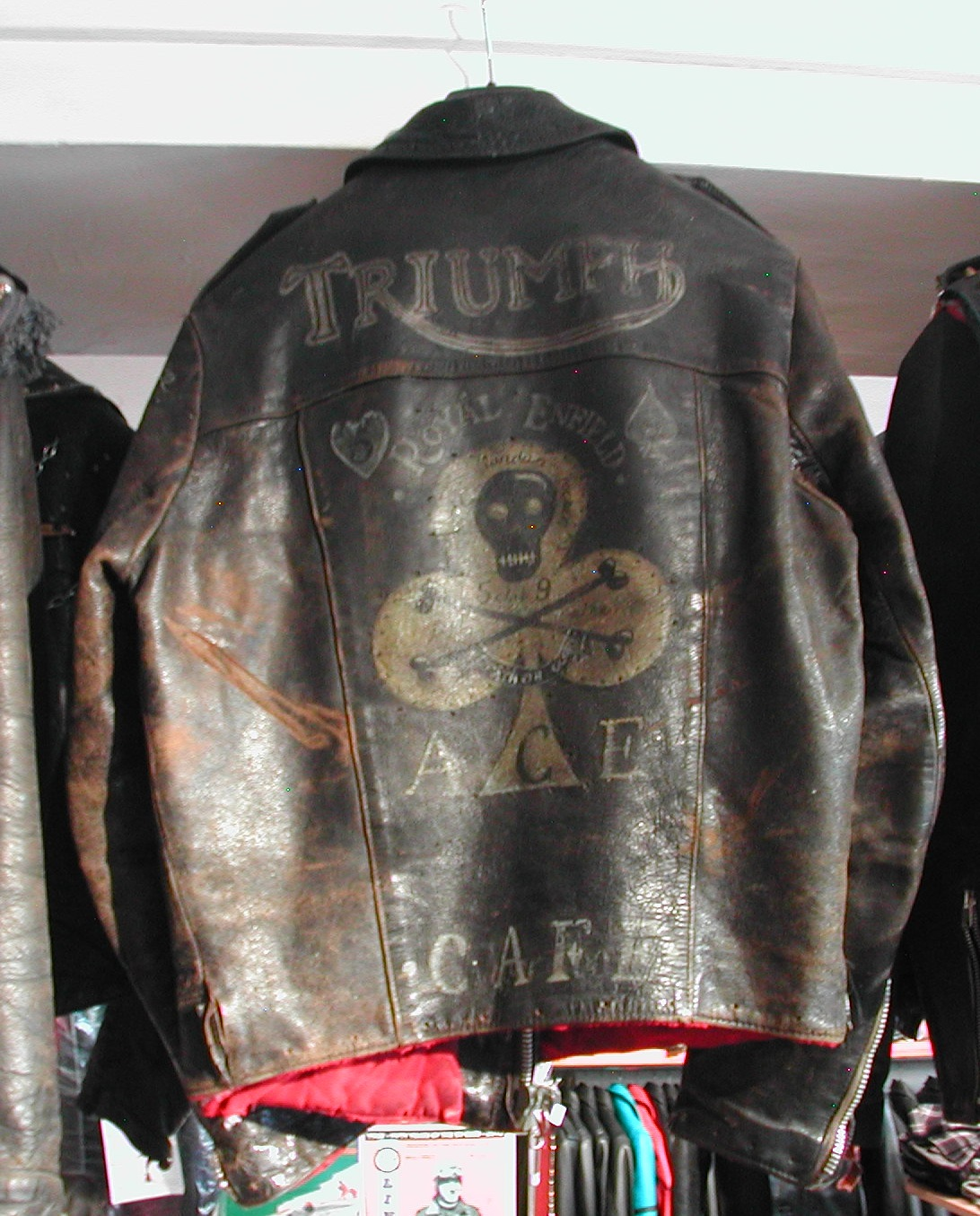
Customised Lewis Leathers black leather motorcyclist's jacket with Ace Cafe detail

The book chronicles the history of the black leather jacket over a seventy-year span up to the mid-1980s, taking in all aspects of its social, cultural and political impact. In the introduction, Farren says: "The black leather jacket has always been the uniform of the bad. Hitler's Gestapo, the Hell's Angels, the Black Panthers, punk rockers, gay bar cruisers, rock 'n' roll animals and the hardcore mutations of the eighties all adopted it as their own."

Initial prints of the book came in leather effect cover. The paperback version had a studio still of Marlon Brando in The Wild One.

== Television documentary ==
The book was adapted into a 60-minute television documentary shown on the United Kingdom television channel Channel 4 in 1988. Nick Mead directed and co-wrote the script with Farren, Paul Cowan produced. The voice over was provided by United States actor Dennis Hopper, with Michael Vartan playing the part of the Motorcycle Boy.

== Song ==
The title music for the television documentary was written and performed by the British heavy rock group Motörhead. Motörhead frontman Lemmy had known Farren since the late 1960s and they had often collaborated, composing songs for The Deviants, Hawkwind and Motörhead. The song remained unreleased until the 2003 Stone Deaf Forever! boxset was issued.
