= Barbarian Princes =

Live album by The Deviants
- Released: 1999
- Recorded: 1999
- Genre: Garage rock
- Label: Dark Matter Distribution

The Deviants chronology
Eating Jello With a Heated Fork (1996)	Barbarian Princes (1999)	Dr. Crow (2002)

Professional ratings
Review scores
Source	Rating
Allmusic	3/5 stars

Barbarian Princes is 1999 live album recorded in Japan recorded by Mick Farren and friends released under the name The Deviants.

The album was recorded with long-time friend and collaborator Andy Colquhoun and featured Wayne Kramer's backing band.

== Track listing ==
1. "Aztec Calendar" (Farren, Colquhoun)
2. "Eating Jello with a Heated Fork" (Farren, Colquhoun)
3. "Disgruntled Employee" (Farren, Lancaster)
4. "It's Alright Ma, I'm Only Bleeding" (Bob Dylan)
5. "God's Worst Nightmare" (Farren, Colquhoun)
6. "Leader Hotel" (Farren, Henry Beck)
7. "Lennon Song" (Colquhoun)
8. "Thunder on the Mountain" (Farren, Colquhoun)
9. "Lurid Night" (Farren, Colquhoun)
10. "Dogpoet" (Farren, Colquhoun)

== Personnel ==
- Mick Farren – vocals
- Andy Colquhoun – guitar
- Doug Lunn – bass
- Ric Parnell – drums
