= Disposable (album) =

Studio album by the Deviants
- Released: October 1968
- Recorded: September 1968
- Studio: Morgan, London
- Genre: Garage rock
- Label: Stable
- Producer: Mick Farren, Stephen Sparkes

The Deviants chronology
| Ptooff! (1967) | Disposable (1968) | The Deviants 3 (1969) |

Professional ratings
Review scores
| Source | Rating |
|---|---|
| AllMusic | 2/5 stars |
| The Encyclopedia of Popular Music | 3/5 stars |

Disposable is a 1968 album by the UK underground group the Deviants.

== Critical reception ==
Trouser Press called the album "goodnaturedly weird."

== Track listing ==
1. "Somewhere to Go" (Mick Farren, Duncan Sanderson)
2. "Sparrows and Wires" (Sid Bishop, Stephen Sparkes)
3. "Jamie's Song" (Mick Farren, Russ Hunter)
4. "You've Got to Hold On" (Mick Farren, Russ Hunter, Sid Bishop)
5. "Fire in the City" (Mick Farren, Duncan Sanderson)
6. "Let's Loot the Supermarket" (Mick Farren)
7. "Pappa Oo Mao Mao" (Al Frazier, Carl White, Sonny Harris, Turner Wilson Jr.)
8. "Slum Lord" (Mick Farren, Sid Bishop)
9. "Blind Joe McTurk's Last Session" (Mick Farren)
10. "Normality Jam" (Dennis Hughes, Duncan Sanderson, M.J. McDonnell, Russ Hunter)
11. "Guaranteed to Bleed" (Duncan Sanderson, Tony Ferguson)
12. "Sidney B. Goode" (Sid Bishop)
13. "Last Man" (Mick Farren)

== Personnel ==
- Mick Farren – vocals (tracks 1, 3, 4, 7–9, 13), 12-string guitar (track 9), organ (track 13)
- Sid Bishop – guitar (tracks 1–5, 7, 8, 10, 12), 12-string guitar (tracks 6, 13)
- Duncan Sanderson – bass (tracks 1, 3–8, 10, 11), vocals (tracks 4, 5, 11), choir (track 7), harmony vocals (track 8)
- Russell Hunter – drums (tracks 1, 3–8, 10, 11), hi-hat (track 2), vocals (tracks 4, 8), choir (track 7), effects (track 13)

with:

- M.J. McDonnell – bass (tracks 1, 8, 10), harmonica (tracks 4, 6, 9), choir (track 7), harmony vocals, (track 8), effects (track 13)
- Dennis Hughes – organ (tracks 1, 10), piano (tracks 6, 8, 11)
- Tony Ferguson – organ (tracks 1, 3, 11, 13)
- Steve Sparkes – narration (track 2)
- Dick Heckstall-Smith – tenor saxophone (track 5), brass arrangement (track 11)
- George – tenor saxophone (track 5)
- Pete Brown – trumpet (track 5)
- David "Boss" Goodman – vocals (track 7), choir (track 7)
- Jennifer Ashworth – choir (track 7)
- Karl Dallas – choir (track 7)
- Andy Johns - engineer
