= Ptooff! =

Studio album by The Deviants
- Released: first edition June 1968 second edition May 1969, on Decca
- Recorded: 1967 at Sound Techniques, London, England
- Genre: Psychedelic rock; garage rock; proto-punk
- Length: 36:18
- Label: Underground Impresarios
- Producer: Jonathan Weber

The Deviants chronology
Ptooff! (1968)	Disposable (1968)

Professional ratings
Review scores
Source	Rating
AllMusic	4/5 stars
The Encyclopedia of Popular Music	4/5 stars
Uncut	3.5/5 stars

Ptooff! is the debut studio album by English psychedelic rock band The Deviants. It was released by mail order only in June 1968 by record label Underground Impresarios and given a more public wide release on Sire Records in 1969.

== Background and recording ==
Mick Farren and Russell Hunter had met 21-year-old millionaire Nigel Samuel who funded the £700 required for the recording of the album.

== Music ==
Richie Unterberger of AllMusic assessed that the band were "not much more than amateurs" at the time of the album's recording, saying they "squeezed every last ounce of skill and imagination out of their limited instrumental and compositional resources." He explained that the style present on Ptooff! constitutes a fusion of "savage social commentary, overheated sexual lust, psychedelic jamming, blues riffs, and pretty acoustic ballads." The staff of BrooklynVegan wrote, "For all the whimsy going on in Britannia during this period, there would be rebellion among some. Here was rebellion in all its glory. [...] This debut record was a middle finger to all of that. It conjured an image of distrust in the flower power hooey they saw wherever they turned, as well as in the establishment." The influence of Frank Zappa and The Fugs is apparent in the album's tracks. The album also contains elements of R&B and avant-garde.

== Release ==
Ptooff!! was released in 1968 and 8,000 copies were sold on their own Impresario label via mail order through the UK underground press, such as Oz and International Times, before being picked up and released by Decca Records. The album is self-described on the inside cover as the deviants underground l.p.

The album was re-released in the mid-1980s by record label Psycho. The cover came in a six-panel fold-out with extensive notes, including a review by John Peel: "There is little that is not good, much that is excellent and the occasional flash of brilliance". There are two quotations in the cartoon drawing that fills three panels; one of them, "When the mode of the music changes, the walls of the city shake!!", is a quote from Tuli Kupferberg. Ptooff! was also re-issued on CD in 1992 by Drop Out Records.

== Reception and legacy ==
Record Collector called Ptoof! "a compellingly itinerant squall of squat-crashing blues-psych-with- issues; the sound of caries and foetid flares."

The staff of BrooklynVegan included the album in the site's list of the 50 best psychedelic rock albums, writing, "this is another record that must have made people at the time go “what the hell.”

== Track listing ==
Side A
No.	Title	Writer(s)	Length
1.	"Opening"	Sid Bishop, Mick Farren, Russell Hunter, Cord Rees, Steve Sparks	0:08
2.	"I'm Coming Home"	Bishop, Farren, Hunter	5:59
3.	"Child of the Sky"	Farren, Rees, Hammond	4:32
4.	"Charlie"	Bishop, Farren	3:56
5.	"Nothing Man"	Farren, Moore	4:21

Side B
No.	Title	Writer(s)	Length
1.	"Garbage"	Bishop, Farren, Hunter	5:36
2.	"Bun"	Rees	2:42
3.	"Deviation Street"	Farren	9:01

== Personnel ==
- Mick Farren – lead vocals, piano
- Sid Bishop – guitar, sitar
- Cord Rees – bass guitar, Spanish guitar
- Russell Hunter – drums, backing vocals
- Duncan Sanderson – vocals and mumbling
- Stephen Sparks – vocals and mumbling
- Jennifer Ashworth – vocals and mumbling
- John Hammond – acoustic guitar
