= It Had to Be You (2000 film) =

- Directed by: Steven Feder
- Screenplay by: Steven Feder
- Produced by: Dan Howard; Deborah Thompson Duda
- Starring: Natasha Henstridge; Michael Vartan; Michael Rispoli
- Distributed by: Trimark Home Video
- Release date: February 11, 2000
- Country: United States
- Language: English

It Had to Be You is a 2000 romantic comedy film starring Natasha Henstridge and Michael Vartan.

== Plot ==
Charlie Hudson and Anna Penn are staying at The Plaza in Manhattan as their respective fiancés Claire and David are in Europe for work and they are left to start wedding preparations. They coincidentally meet at the reception and then again in the elevator.

Charlie invites his good friend Henry Taylor to dinner in the hotel's restaurant. Anna comes in, and their eyes meet. Henry notices, and teases Charlie. Again, Charlie and Anna share the elevator, and she makes a weak attempt at small talk. That night, as she falls asleep in the tub, her overflowing water seeps onto Charlie's bed below, so he goes upstairs with maintenance.

The next morning, Charlie and Anna meet again in a wedding shop while registering gifts. They end up registering side by side. Separating to get their bridal party gifts, they couldn't help but notice the salespeople's negative views of marriage.

Charlie invites Anna to dinner, and they get further acquainted. She reveals that she teaches fourth grade, and he explains that he'd quit the police force six months ago, as he wasn't able to prevent a child from committing suicide. Meanwhile, Henry meets Anna's maid of honor Tracey in a bar, and they hit it off. Although he's full of pick-up lines, at closing time, he walks her home without pressuring her.

Checking out possible wedding bands is the next day's project, and they find the bands are abysmal. They come across an old contact of Charlie's who's gone a bit loopy after his divorce, then pop in to briefly visit the priest officiating his wedding. He spooks Anna, who heads off for lunch with her mother.

Anna endures lunch with her mother, who thinks she's settling and warns her that his OCD will only worsen. Then David's mother shows up, demonstrating he picked up the disorder from her. Charlie and Henry have lunch, and he brings up love at first sight. Tracey also talks about it to Anna, trying to convince her to give him a shot.

Henry suggests Charlie tell Anna how he feels. He rents a horse-drawn carriage and brings champagne. They almost kiss, but she reminds him about Claire and David, so they part and return to the hotel. Charlie's fiancée is waiting for him in his room.

Claire leaves early the next day, Charlie is encouraged to seek Anna out and confess his feelings. When he tries to, she makes him believe it's not mutual and leaves. We see the four lead characters resume their lives, Charlie is finally writing his book, Anna teaching, Henry finally takes AA seriously, and Tracey seeks him out at the bar where they'd met, but they haven't seen him.

A year later, Charlie's book is published, and Anna's workmate tells her about it. Realizing it's about them, Anna seeks out Tracey and they go looking for him at the precinct and discover he's an officer again in an attempt to rescue a suicidal child. They find both of the officers; Henry explains he is on the wagon and was too embarrassed to call Tracey and they finally kiss.

The closing is at Charlie and Anna's wedding.

== Cast ==
- Natasha Henstridge as Anna Penn
- Michael Vartan as Charlie Hudson
- Michael Rispoli as Henry Taylor
- Olivia d'Abo as Tracey Meltempi
- Joelle Carter as Claire

== Production ==
In January 1998, it was announced Michael Vartan had been cast as the co-lead opposite Henstridge. Despite being filmed in 1998, it was not until 2001 the film was acquired for distribution by Regent Entertainment.

== Release ==
The film was released direct-to-video October 8, 2002 by Trimark Home Video
