= Protectorate (novel) =

1984 novel by Mick Farren

Protectorate is a novel written by Mick Farren and published in 1984.

== Plot summary ==
Protectorate is a novel in which the decadent rich people live in gleaming towers, while the Lower Dwellers live in poverty crowded far below, while their alien overlords have absolute control over humanity.

== Reception ==
Colin Greenland reviewed Protectorate for Imagine magazine, and stated that "Farren strolls once more down these mean streets with his hands in his pockets, cheerfully pessimistic. He quite likes it all. really. No great writer, Farren, but nobody's fool either, and that's quite valuable these days."

== Reviews ==
- Review by Richard Law (1985) in Fantasy Review, April 1985
- Review by Paul McGuire (1986) in Science Fiction Review, Spring 1986
- Review by Don D'Ammassa (1986) in Science Fiction Chronicle, #79 April 1986
