= Michael Vartan =

French-American actor (born 1968)

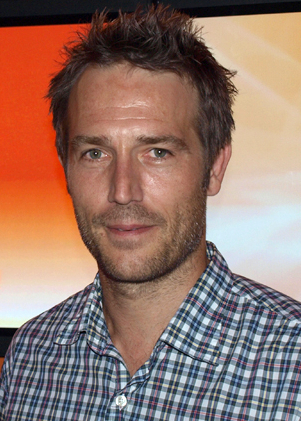
- Vartan in September 2010
- Born: 27 November 1968 (age 57); Boulogne-Billancourt, France
- Occupation: Actor
- Years active: 1988–2018
- Spouse: Lauren Skaar (m. 2011; div. 2014)
- Parents: Eddie Vartan (father); Doris Pucher (mother)
- Relatives: Sylvie Vartan (aunt); David Hallyday (cousin)

Michael Vartan (born November 27, 1968) is an American actor, known for his role as Michael Vaughn on the ABC television action drama Alias, his role on the TNT medical drama Hawthorne, and his role on the E! drama The Arrangement as Terence Anderson. His film roles include The Pallbearer, Never Been Kissed, The Next Best Thing, One Hour Photo, To Wong Foo, Thanks for Everything! Julie Newmar, Monster-in-Law, Rogue, Colombiana, and Small Town Crime.

== Early life ==
Vartan is the son of Edmond "Eddie" Vartan, a musician, and Doris (née Pucher), a painter and artist. His paternal aunt is singer Sylvie Vartan and his stepfather is writer Ian La Frenais. Michael's paternal grandfather was of Armenian and Bulgarian descent, while Michael's paternal grandmother was of Hungarian Jewish background. Michael's mother is a Polish Jewish immigrant to the United States.

Vartan has said about his French background that "The funny thing is I'm actually a Polish Jew who happens to be born in France. My mom is Polish and my dad is Bulgarian. I don't have an ounce of French blood. But I work it".

His parents divorced when he was five and he moved to the United States with his mother. He moved back to France to be with his father until his high school years, and grew up a "farm kid" in a "simple environment" in Fleury, Manche, a small town in Normandy. At age eighteen, Vartan moved back to his mother in Los Angeles, telling her that he wanted to be an artist, because he did not wish to fulfill the mandatory military service required in France. In Los Angeles, he attended an acting school after he was told he possessed acting talent. He also attended the Lycée Français de Los Angeles. Vartan now considers himself to be American and stated on the talk show Rove that he would like Australia to be his second home. He is bilingual in French and English.

== Career ==
After starring roles in European films, including an acclaimed performance in the Taviani Brothers' Fiorile, and several smaller film roles, Vartan had noticeable supporting roles in major Hollywood movies, including Never Been Kissed (1999), One Hour Photo (2002) and Monster-in-Law (2005). In 2007, he appeared in the Australian horror film Rogue, and starred in the film Jolene in 2008.

Vartan's most notable role to date has been as Michael Vaughn in the American television series Alias (2001–2006). He played the role of Lancelot in TNT's production of Marion Zimmer Bradley's The Mists of Avalon (2001). Vartan has also had guest appearances on Friends (as Dr. Tim Burke, Tom Selleck's character's son) and Ally McBeal (as Jonathan Basset). He also appeared on the show Kitchen Confidential, which starred his former Alias co-star Bradley Cooper, as a French chef who was Cooper's rival. In September 2007, Vartan played James Walker, a main role in the ABC drama Big Shots. However, the show was canceled after one season.

Vartan co-starred opposite Jada Pinkett Smith in TNT's series Hawthorne. Vartan replaced Jeffrey Nordling, who played the role in the pilot. TNT canceled the series after its third season.

He starred as Terence Anderson on the E! drama The Arrangement.

Vartan co-hosts a weekly live sports program called Advanced Shouting with friends Dan Petriw and Noel Fogelman. The first episode was uploaded to YouTube in June 2020. The broadcast is also available via Facebook. Since his last film and television roles in 2017 and 2018 respectively, Vartan has largely stepped away from acting and lives a quiet, private life in Los Angeles.

== Personal life ==
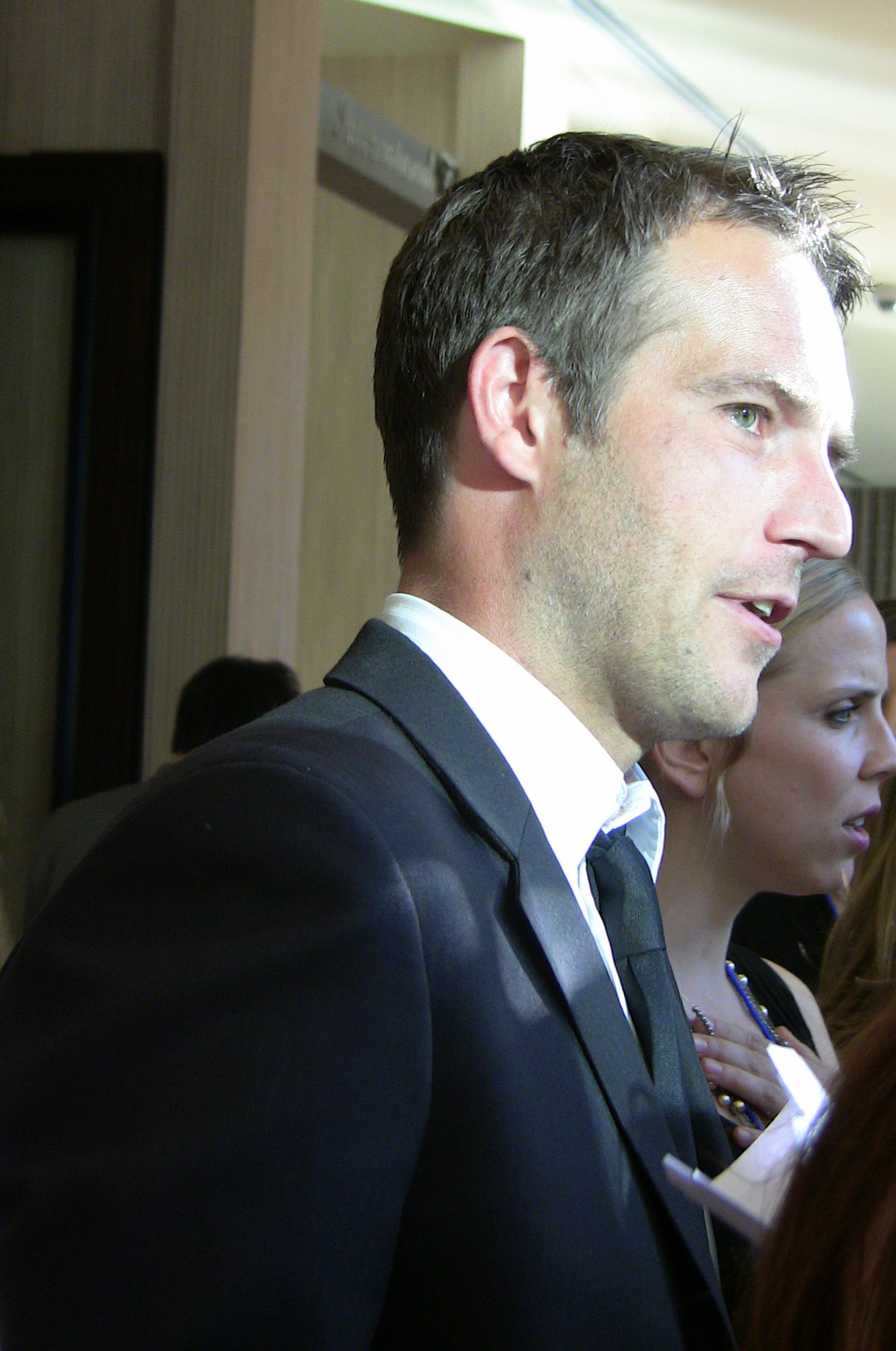
Vartan at the 23rd Genesis Awards, Beverly Hills, California, March 28, 2009

Vartan began dating his Alias co-star Jennifer Garner in mid-2003. After several months of rumors, their break-up was confirmed in August 2004.

In March 2010, Vartan announced his engagement to Lauren Skaar, whom he met in a Whole Foods Market parking lot in Los Angeles in 2009. The couple married on April 2, 2011, at the Pelican Hill Resort in Newport Beach, California. Skaar filed for divorce in July 2014, citing irreconcilable differences.

Vartan has a dog named Millie, with whom he appeared in a PETA video about good canine care and to whom he wrote a "love letter" for an anthology. He is a keen supporter of Australian rules football, having watched the game on numerous visits to Australia, in particular Melbourne. He is good friends with Brendan Fevola and supports Carlton. After the completion of the film Rogue, Vartan got a Southern Cross tattoo on his right arm to show his love for Australia.

Vartan is also a fan of ice hockey, a trait incorporated into his character, Michael Vaughn, on Alias.

== Filmography ==
=== Film ===
Year	Title	Role	Notes
1991	One Man and Two Women	Fred	
1992	Summer Walks	Thomas	
1992	Stringer	Chris	
1993	Fiorile	Jean / Massimo	
1995	To Wong Foo, Thanks for Everything! Julie Newmar	Tommy	
1996	The Pallbearer	Scott	
1997	Touch Me	Adam	
1997	The Myth of Fingerprints	Jake	
1998	The Curve	Chris	
1999	Never Been Kissed	Sam Coulson	Nominated—MTV Movie Award for Best Kiss (with Drew Barrymore)
2000	It Had to Be You	Charlie Hudson	
2000	The Next Best Thing	Kevin Lasater	
2000	Sand	Tyler Briggs	
2002	One Hour Photo	Will Yorkin	
2005	Monster-in-Law	Dr. Kevin Fields	
2007	Rogue	Pete McKell	
2008	Jolene	Brad	
2010	High School	Calculus Teacher	Uncredited
2011	Demoted	Rodney McAdams	
2011	Colombiana	Danny Delanay	
2016	Within (aka Crawlspace)	John Alexander	
2016	Nina	Radio Interviewer	
2017	Small Town Crime	Detective Crawford	

=== Television ===
Year	Title	Role	Notes
1988	Black Leather Jacket	Motorcycle Boy	Television film
1993	Spender	Paul Ducheyne	Episode: "Puck"
1993	Fallen Angels	Harry Stone	Episode: "Murder, Obliquely"
1997	Friends	Dr. Tim Burke	Episode: "The One with Chandler in a Box"
2000	Ally McBeal	Jonathan Bassett	2 episodes
2001	The Mists of Avalon	Lancelot	Television film
2001–2006	Alias	Michael Vaughn	95 episodes Nominated—Saturn Award for Best Actor on Television; Nominated—Teen Choice Award for Choice TV Actor – Drama/Action Adventure; Nominated—Teen Choice Award for Choice TV Male Breakout Star
2005	Kitchen Confidential	Michel Valentine	Episode: "French Fight"
2007	Big Shots	James Walker	11 episodes
2009–2011	Hawthorne	Dr. Tom Wakefield	30 episodes
2012	Go On	Himself	Episode: "Bench-Clearing Bawl"
2012	Ring of Fire	Dr. Matthew Cooper	2 episodes
2014	Bates Motel	George Heldens	6 episodes
2014	Satisfaction	Dylan	3 episodes
2015	Rectify	Forrest	Episode: "Sown with Salt"
2017–2018	The Arrangement	Terence Anderson	20 episodes
2018	God Friended Me	Jeffrey Bloom	Episode: "The Prodigal Son"
