= Playtime Is Over =

Playtime Is Over or Playtime's Over may refer to:

- Playtime's Over (album), by Candyman, 1991
- Playtime Is Over (Wiley album), 2007
- Playtime Is Over (mixtape), by Nicki Minaj, 2007
- Playtyme Is Over, an album by Immature, 1994
- "Playtime's Over" (Teenage Mutant Ninja Turtles), a 2006 television episode

== See also ==
- Playtime (disambiguation)
