= Victor Renquist =

Victor Renquist is a fictional character created by Mick Farren. He has appeared in a series of books known as The Renquist Quartet.

== Profile ==
Born in the twelfth century, the illegitimate son of a nobleman, Victor Renquist grows up to become a sword for hire. When in his forties, he works for a breakaway Christian sect known as the Cathars during their hopeless last stand against the forces of Pope Innocent III, in which he is mortally wounded. To save his life, the Cathars call upon an entity known as Lamia the Great Vampire, who makes, or "turns" him to a vampire as well.

During the intervening centuries, Renquist survives not only on blood, but also by accepting jobs for various political and intelligence agencies. He has reputedly works for the Duke of Wellington, Nicholas II of Russia, and the NSA. Along the way, he has evaded capture by the Spanish Inquisition, the Knights of Sebastopol and the Gestapo.

As a vampire, he is faster, stronger, and hardier than a human. He is also able to read minds, brainwash and hypnotize people. He is vulnerable to radioactivity, both from natural (the Sun) and unnatural sources (such as nuclear devices). As their leader, he lives with at least four other vampires in a "colony" of vampires in an isolated residence in California.

Through the series, we are told of how vampires evolved from a warrior class created by an alien race called the Nephilim. The Nephilim conquered Earth millennia ago and tinkered with the primitive humans to create two classes: warrior (Nosferatu) and administrator (Urshuu). However, the Nephilim left Earth in antiquity, leaving their creations behind.

Over the course of the books, Renquist clashes with, variously, the Old God Cthulhu, the vampire Clan, Fenrior, members of his own colony, a Nazi society living in caverns under the ground (in an environment which is supposed to be the basis of the Hollow Earth), the mythic magician Merlin, a cult known as The Apogee, and the Dhrakuh, an ancient race of sentient reptiles (who it is implied are the basis of dragon legends).

== Books ==
1. The Time of Feasting (1996)
2. Darklost (2000)
3. More Than Mortal (2001)
4. Underland (2002)
