= Mona – The Carnivorous Circus =

Mona—The Carnivorous Circus

Studio album by Mick Farren
- Released: March 1970
- Recorded: December 1969
- Studio: Sound Techniques, London
- Label: Transatlantic - TRA212
- Producer: Mick Farren

Mick Farren chronology
Mona—The Carnivorous Circus (1970)	Vampires Stole My Lunch Money (1978)

Professional ratings
Review scores
Source	Rating
Allmusic	4/5 stars

Mona—The Carnivorous Circus is a 1970 album by the UK underground artist Mick Farren.

The album was recorded to fulfill contractual obligations. Farren had recently returned from a tour of the west coast of North America without his band The Deviants, who had risen up against him and sacked him. Farren had, however, previously discussed the idea of a solo album for the second LP of three on the Transatlantic contract (after The Deviants 3), with the third LP to be an album by the other band members, potentially also featuring drummer Russell Hunter's girlfriend Jenny Ashworth as frontwoman - an idea with which the three sidemen had been toying around the time of the contract signing.

Farren recalled that "I was crazy when I did Mona—really mentally ill. If I listen to it I can still feel it. Maybe I should have chilled out for a few months before making the album, but I was a bit depressed, and I thought I'd just do it entirely my own way for the first time."

"Carnivorous Circus" is a montage of song and spoken word, featuring interviews with a Hells Angel and Steve Took, the latter recounting time he spent in Ashford Remand Centre, as well as recordings of political speeches. Took also provides lead vocal for the short "Observe The Ravens" section of the title track. Also, during the "Society of the Horsemen" jam he quotes a lyric ("it don't feel good, 'cos it was made out of wood") from one of his own songs, "Steel Abortion" (later recorded by his band Shagrat). The cello on "Mona" was provided by Paul Buckmaster, who had demonstrated to Farren the similarities between the music of Bo Diddley and Béla Bartók.

== Track listing ==
1. "Mona (A Fragment)" (Ellas McDaniel) – 3:15
2. "Carnivorous Circus, Part 1" (Farren) – 15:19
  1. "The Whole Thing Starts"
  2. "But Charlie, It's Still Moving"
  3. "Observe The Ravens"
  4. "Society of the Horsemen"
3. "Summertime Blues" (Eddie Cochran, Jerry Capehart) – 2:41
4. "Carnivorous Circus, Part 2" (Farren) – 13:01
  1. "Don't Talk to Me Mary"
  2. "You Can't Move Me"
  3. "In My Window Box"
  4. "An Epitaph Can Point the Way"
5. "Mona (The Whole Trip)" (Ellas McDaniel) – 7:25

== Personnel ==
- Mick Farren – vocals, effects
- Steve Hammond – guitar, vocals
- Pete Robinson – organ, piano
- Johnny Gustavson – bass
- Paul Buckmaster – cello
- Twink – drums, vocals, percussion
- Shagrat the Vagrant (Steve Peregrin Took) – vocals, percussion
- Raul – conga

Technical

- Produced by Mick Farren
- Arranged by Mick Farren and Steve Hammond
- Recorded at Sound Techniques, London, December 1969
- Victor Gamm – Engineering

== Release history ==
- March 1970, UK, Transatlantic Records, TRA212
- 1984, UK, Psycho
- 1999, UK, Castle Communications, ESMCD746, with The Deviants 3
