= Eating Jello with a Heated Fork =

Studio album by Deviants IXVI
- Released: 1996
- Recorded: 1996
- Genre: Garage Rock
- Label: Alive
- Producer: Mick Farren, Andy Colquhoun, Jack Lancaster

Deviants IXVI chronology
Human Garbage (1984)	Eating Jello with a Heated Fork (1996)	Barbarian Princes (1999)

Professional ratings
Review scores
Source	Rating
AllMusic	4/5 stars

Eating Jello with a Heated Fork is 1996 studio album recorded by Mick Farren and friends released under the name Deviants IXVI.

The album was recorded with longtime friends and collaborators Andy Colquhoun and Jack Lancaster and featured Wayne Kramer and his band.

== Track listing ==
1. "Eating Jello with a Heated Fork" (Farren, Colquhoun)
2. "On Such a Lurid Night" (Farren, Colquhoun)
3. "God's Worst Nightmare" (Farren, Kramer)
4. "Thunder on the Mountain" (Farren, Colquhoun)
5. "Three Headed Lobster Boy" (Farren, Lancaster)
6. "You Won't Make It Here" (Farren, Lancaster)
7. "Arts of Darkness" (Farren, Lancaster)
8. "Hard Times" (Farren, Colquhoun)
9. "Rivers of Hell" (Farren, Colquhoun)

== Personnel ==
- Mick Farren – vocals
- Andy Colquhoun – guitar
- Jack Lancaster – saxophone
- Wayne Kramer – guitar
- Paul Ill – bass
- Brock Avery – drums, percussion
- Brad Dourif – didgeridoo on "Three Headed Lobster Boy"
- Chuck Briggs, Kerry Martinez, Duane Peters, Susan Slater, Ernie Snair, Gary Twinn – backing vocals
