= Dr. Crow =

Studio album by The Deviants
- Released: 2002
- Recorded: 2002
- Genre: Garage rock
- Label: Track
- Producer: Andy Colquhoun

The Deviants chronology
Barbarian Princes (1999)	Dr. Crow (2002)

Professional ratings
Review scores
Source	Rating
Allmusic	4/5 stars

Dr. Crow is a studio album by Mick Farren and friends. It was released in 2002 under the name The Deviants.

The album was recorded with longtime friends and collaborators, including Andy Colquhoun and Jack Lancaster, and also featured Wayne Kramer's backing band. Former Motörhead drummer Phil "Philthy Animal" Taylor guests on one track.

The 2004 release on the Japanese label Captain Trip Records differs slightly, as it adds two tracks (covers of "Strawberry Fields Forever" and "The Man Who Shot Liberty Valance") and uses a different running order and artwork (the latter still featuring the Dr. Crow character drawn by Edward Barker).

== Track listing ==
1. "When Dr. Crow Turns on the Radio"
2. "You're Gonna Need Somebody on your Bond"
3. "The Murdering Officer"
4. "Sold to Babylon"
5. "Taste the Blue"
6. "Song of the Hired Guns"
7. "Diabolo's Cadillac"
8. "The Man Who Shot Liberty Valance" (Burt Bacharach, Hal David)
9. "Bela Lugosi 2002"
10. "A Long Dry Season"
11. "What Do You Want?"

== Personnel ==
- Mick Farren – vocals
- Andy Colquhoun – guitar, bass, keyboards, vocals
- Jack Lancaster – tenor and soprano saxophone
- Doug Lunn – bass
- Ric Parnell – drums
- Michael Simmons – vocals
- Johnette Napolitano – vocal duet on "You're Gonna Need Somebody on Your Bond"
- The Deviettes (Johnette Napolitano, Carol Phillips, Blare N. Bitch) – vocals
- Phil "Philthy Animal" Taylor – drums on "A Long Dry Season"
