= The Deviants 3 =

Studio album by The Deviants
- Released: October 1969
- Recorded: 1969
- Genre: Psychedelic; garage rock
- Label: Transatlantic
- Producer: Mick Farren

The Deviants chronology
Disposable (1968)	The Deviants 3 (1969)

Professional ratings
Review scores
Source	Rating
AllMusic	2.5/5 stars
The Encyclopedia of Popular Music	2/5 stars

The Deviants 3 is the third studio album by the UK underground group the Deviants, released in 1969.

Lead vocalist Mick Farren regards the album as the beginning of a divergence between himself and his fellow musicians, stating "I had one idea and the rest of them wanted to be a kind of Led Zeppelin guitar band". Soon after the band would split, with Farren going on to record the Mona – The Carnivorous Circus album. Farren eventually left the music business, while his ex-bandmates continued as the Pink Fairies.

== Critical reception ==
Trouser Press called 3 "harder-rocking and spacier" than the previous albums. Perfect Sound Forever called the album "a much more consistent collection of songs than Disposable", writing that "musically, it tends to be more focused and you can hear that the playing is more solid, which can be good at times, but it also means that the musicians occasionally slip into bland '60's electric blues formalities". Uncut wrote that the Deviants "were beginning to sound like just another heavy rock band".

== Track listing ==
All tracks arranged by The Deviants and composed by Paul Rudolph except where noted.

1. "Billy the Monster" – 3:26
2. "Broken Biscuits" – 2:10 (Duncan Sanderson, Paul Rudolph, Russell Hunter)
3. "First Line (Seven the Row)" – 2:44 (Duncan Sanderson)
4. "The People Suite" – 2:24 (The Deviants)
5. "Rambling B(l)ack Transit Blues" – 5:37
6. "Death of a Dream Machine" – 2:50
7. "Playtime" – 3:06
8. "Black George Does It with His Tongue" – 1:20
9. "The Junior Narco Rangers" – 0:28
10. "Lets Drink to the People" – 1:32
11. "Metamorphosis Exploration" – 8:57 (Duncan Sanderson, Paul Rudolph, Russell Hunter)

== Personnel ==
The Deviants

- Mick Farren – lead vocals, production
- Paul Rudolph – guitar, vocals, mouth music
- Duncan Sanderson – bass, vocals
- Russell Hunter – percussion, vocals, stereo panning

Additional personnel

- Tony Ferguson – organ
- Tony Wiggens – equipment, lead vocal on "First Line"
- David "Boss" Goodman – equipment, backing vocals
- Jenny Ashworth – vocals

Technical personnel

- Roy Thomas Baker – engineering
- Victor Gamm – engineering
- Keith Morris – photography

Recording

- Recorded at Morgan Studios and Sound Techniques, London
- Arrangements by The Deviants

== Release history ==
- September 1969, UK, Transatlantic Records, TRA204
- 1999, UK, Castle Communications, ESMCD746, with Mona – The Carnivorous Circus
