= Saint Darius =

Greek saint

Martyr
- Died: 4th century Nicaea
- Feast: October 21 (Eastern Orthodox Church); February 23 (Catholic Church)

St. Darius (or Dario) is a saint of the Oriental Orthodox Churches, the Eastern Orthodox Church and the Catholic Church. His feast day is celebrated October 21 (or December 19 in the Catholic Church).

Darius is mentioned in the old martyrologies as having been martyred in the 4th century in Nicaea alongside Zosimus, Paul and Secundus.

Their presence there points to the city having an active Christian population at the beginning of this century. Nicaea (now İznik) would become the site of the First Council of Nicaea (325) and the Second Council of Nicaea (787), respectively the first and seventh Ecumenical councils
