= December 6 (Eastern Orthodox liturgics) =

Day in the Eastern Orthodox liturgical calendar

Eastern Orthodox liturgical calendar
December 5	December 6	December 7
December 6 O.S. ≍ December 19 N.S. December 6 N.S ≍ November 23 O.S.

St. Nicholas the Wonderworker, Archbishop of Myra in Lycia. (Interior of Hagia Sophia Cathedral, Warsaw).

December 6 in Eastern Orthodox liturgical calendars is a feast day and a day of commemoration of saints and martyrs. Although some Orthodox churches use the Revised Julian Calendar and others use the traditional Julian calendar, the fixed commemorations for their respective December 6 are broadly the same, no matter which calendar is used. (Note: Despite the dates being the same, the days to which they refer typically differ by 13 days. The notation Old Style or O.S. is sometimes used to indicate a date in the traditional Julian Calendar (the "Old Calendar"). The notation New Style or N.S. indicates a date in the Revised Julian calendar (the "New Calendar").)

== Saints ==
- Saint Theophilus, Bishop of Antioch (181)
- Martyr Niser, under Maximian, by fire (c. 286-305) (Note: Saint Niser is an unknown martyr that is found in the Synaxarion of Saint Nicodemus and in the Menaia.)
- Saint Nicholas the Wonderworker, Archbishop of Myra in Lycia (c. 345) (Note: Name days celebrated today include: Nicholas, Nikos (Νίκος); Nicoleta (Νικολέτα).) (Note: "AT Myra, the metropolis of Lycia, the birthday of St. Nicholas, bishop and confessor, of whom it is related, among other miracles, that, while at a great distance from the emperor Constantine, he appeared to him in a vision and moved him to mercy so as to deter him from putting to death some persons who had implored his assistance.") (Note: This is the feast day of "Cold Nicholas" as he is popularly called in Ukraine, his great festal day as the patron of children in particular. He is a patron of Ukraine and many legends surround his various patronages, including prayers in honour of his seven major miracles mentioned in his Life.)
- Saint Nicholas, Bishop of Patara, uncle of Saint Nicholas of Myra (4th century)
- Saint Abramius, Bishop of Cratea (Cratia, Kratia) in Bithynia (6th century)

== Pre-Schism Western saints ==
- Saint Asella (406) (Note: 'A flower of the Lord', this virgin became a nun in Rome at the age of ten and then lived for many years until she became abbess, 'the mother of many virgins'.) (Note: "At Rome, St. Asella, virgin, who, according to the words of St. Jerome, being blessed from her mother's womb, lived to old age in fasting and prayer.")
- Saints Auxilius, Isserninus and Secundinus, missionaries with Saint Patrick in the enlightenment of Ireland (5th century) (Note: "AUXILIUS and ISSERNINUS accompanied the great Apostle of Ireland from his own country to the field of his labours, and SECUNDINUS was either one of the party or followed soon afterwards. On the supposition that St. Patrick was born in Great Britain, these holy men also are counted as British Saints. After labouring with success for a certain time, they were sent to Britain, or Gaul, to receive episcopal consecration at the hands of three prelates, according to the sacred canons. There still remains an authentic and interesting decree, signed by Auxilius, Patrick, Secundinus, and Benignus, ordering that appeals from the Primate of Armagh should be carried to the Holy See of Rome.")
- Martyrs Dionysia, Dativa, Leontia, Tertius, Emilian, Boniface, Majoricus, and Servus, in North Africa under the Arian Vandal Hunneric (c. 484) (Note: "In Africa, in the persecution of the Vandals, and under the Arian king Hunneric, the saintly women Dionysia, Dativa, Leontia, a religious man named Tertius, Aemilian, a physician, and Boniface, with three others, who were subjected to numberless most painful torments for the Catholic faith, and thus merited to rank among the confessors of Christ.")
- Saint Gertrude the Elder, founder and first Abbess of Hamaye (Hamay, Hamage) near Douai, in north France (649)

== Post-Schism Orthodox saints ==
- Blessed Maximus, Metropolitan of Kiev and all Rus (1305)

=== New martyrs and confessors ===
- New Martyr Nicholas Karamanos of Smyrna (1657) (see also March 19)
- New Hieromartyr Michael Uspensky, Priest of Moscow (1937)
- New Hieromartyrs/Hieroconfessors Nicholas, Priest of Tobolsk, Nicholas, Missionary of Moscow, and Nicholas, Priest of Novo-Nikolskaya (1942)
- New Hieromartyr Grigol Peradze of Georgia, Archimandrite (1942) (see also: November 23 - O.S.)

== Other commemorations ==
- The miraculous apparition of Saint Nicholas at the First Ecumenical Council (325) (Note: While at the First Ecumenical Council that condemned Arianism, St. Nicholas punched Arius in the face and was censured by the Fathers of the Council for behaviour unbecoming a Bishop. His bishop’s mantle and gospel were taken away from him. But at that moment, an apparition occurred with the appearance of Christ and His Mother on either side of Nicholas, bearing a bishop’s mantle and a gospel-book. The Fathers then immediately reinstated Nicholas and icons of him to this day celebrate the miraculous event.)
- Divine warning of an impending earthquake in Constantinople (1090)
- Name Day of Royal Passion-Bearer Tsar Nicholas II (1918)
- Glorification (1996) of Saint Peter Mogila (Petro Mohyla), Metropolitan of Kiev (1646) (Note: According to the Russian Open Orthodox Encyclopedia "The Tree": "On December 6, 1996, the Holy Synod of the Ukrainian Orthodox Church canonized Metropolitan Petro (Mohyla) of Kiev as a locally venerated saint and established his feast day on December 31 (January 13 n.s.). The canonization was carried out hastily, since in parallel the schismatic "Kiev Patriarchate" was also preparing its own "canonization", which followed six days later.: At its working session on March 12-13, 2002, the Holy Synod of the Romanian Orthodox Church, on the recommendation of the Archdiocese of Iasi, decided to include the name of St. Peter among the saints of the Romanian Church on December 22.; On December 8, 2005, with the blessing of Patriarch Alexy II of Moscow and All Russia, the name of St. Peter was included in the calendar of the Russian Orthodox Church.; On July 20, 2012, by decision of the Synod of the Ukrainian Orthodox Church, the name of the saint was included in the Synaxis of Volyn Saints.; On April 1, 2015, by the decision of the Holy Synod of the Ukrainian Orthodox Church, his name was also included in the newly formed Synaxis of Saints of Vinnytsia.") (see also: December 31 - Feast day)

=== Icons ===
- Icon of Our Lady of Tambov (1695)
- Seafaring Icon of the Mother of God.
- The Wonderworking icon of Saint Nicholas the Drenched of St. Sophia's Cathedral in Kiev.

== Icon gallery ==
St. Nicholas of Myra.
(Menologion of Basil II, 10th century).

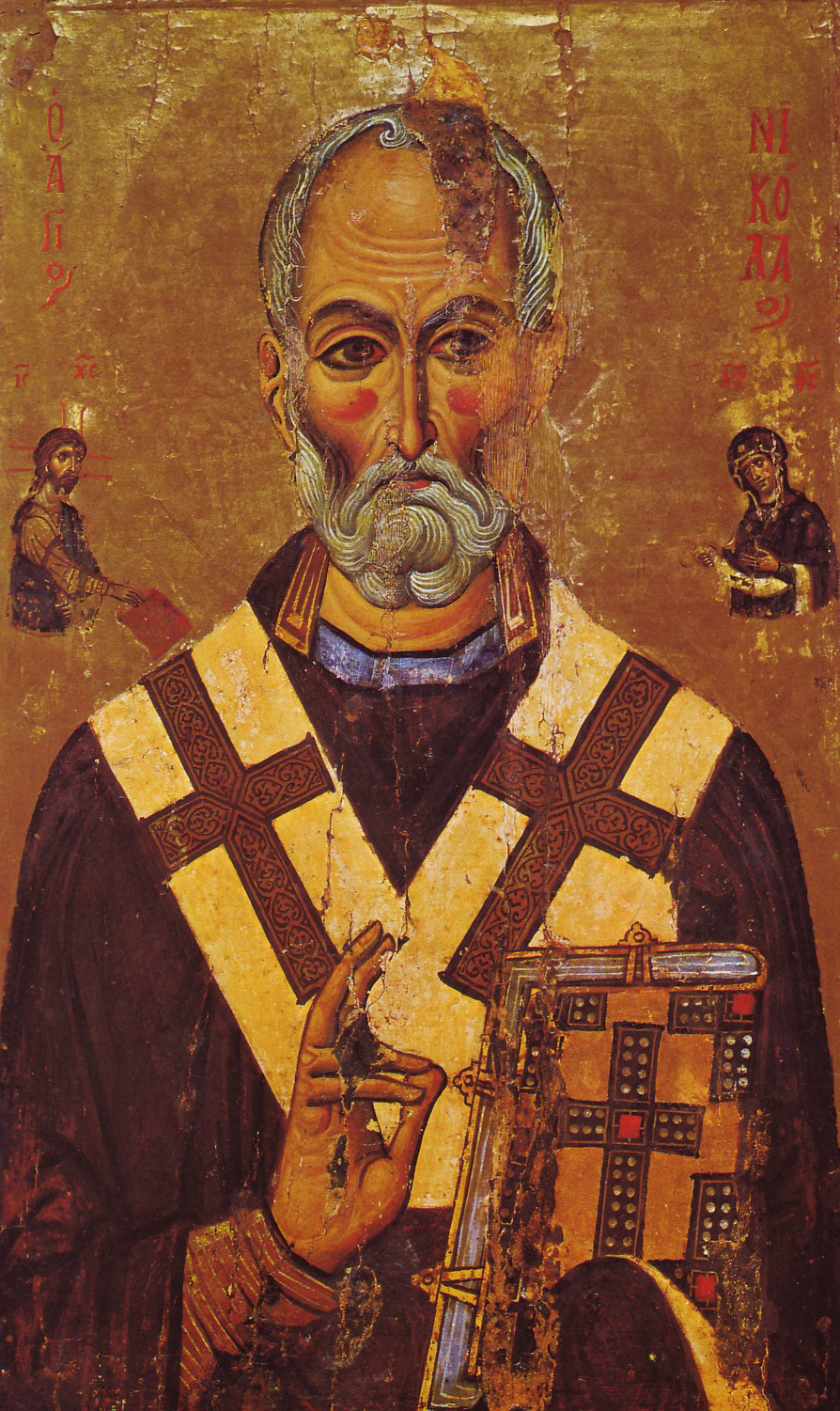
St. Nicholas.
(Saint Catherine's Monastery, Sinai, 13th century).

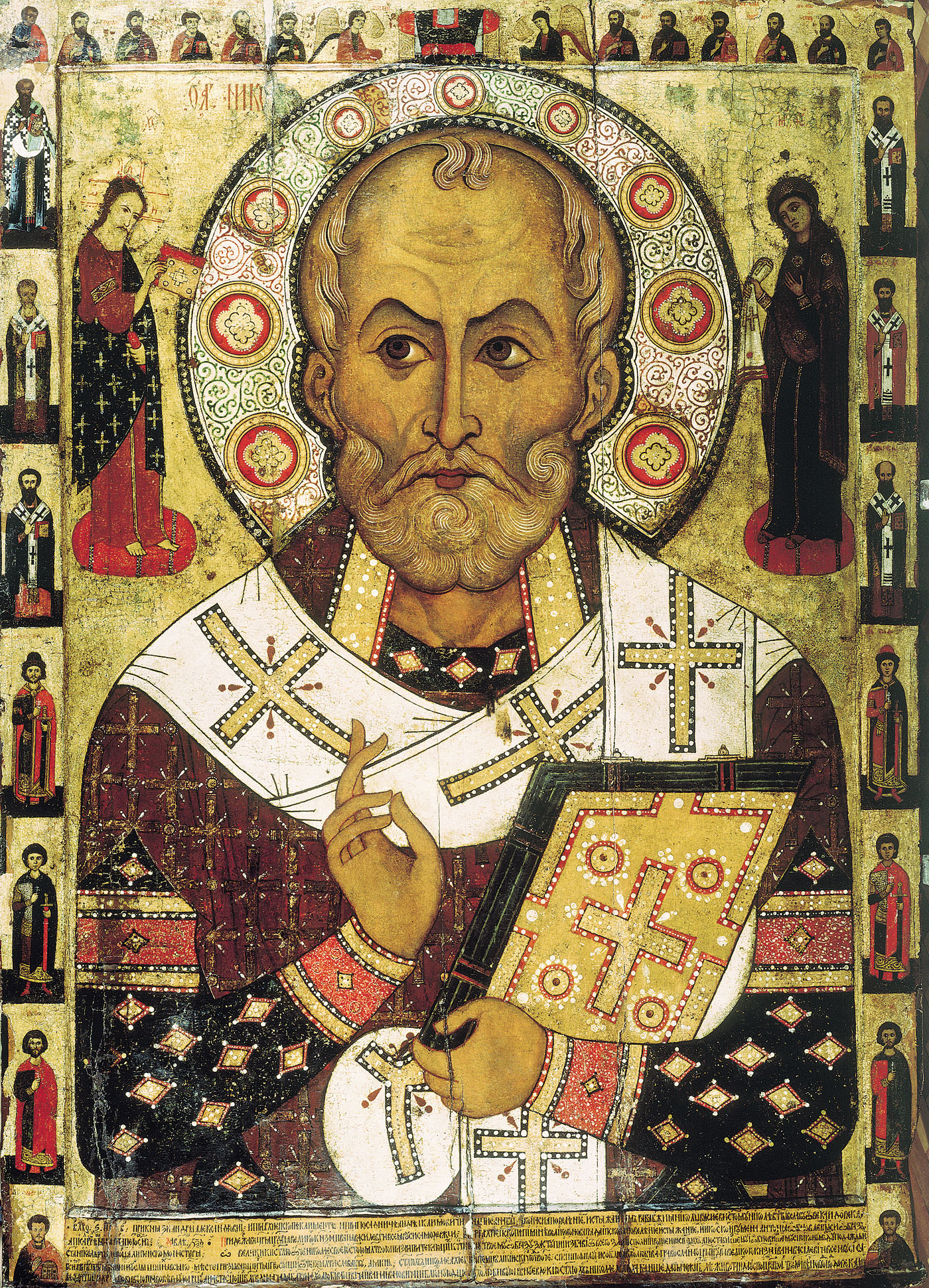
St. Nicholas "Lipensky".
(Russian icon from Lipnya Church of St. Nicholas in Novgorod, 1294).

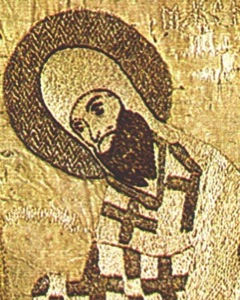
St. Maximus, Metropolitan of Kiev and all Rus.

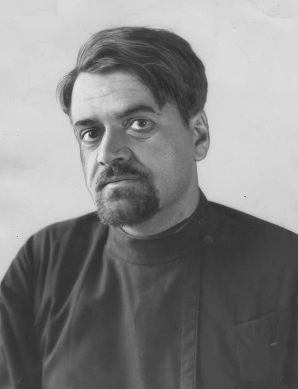
New Martyr Archimandrite Gregory (Peradze) of Georgia.

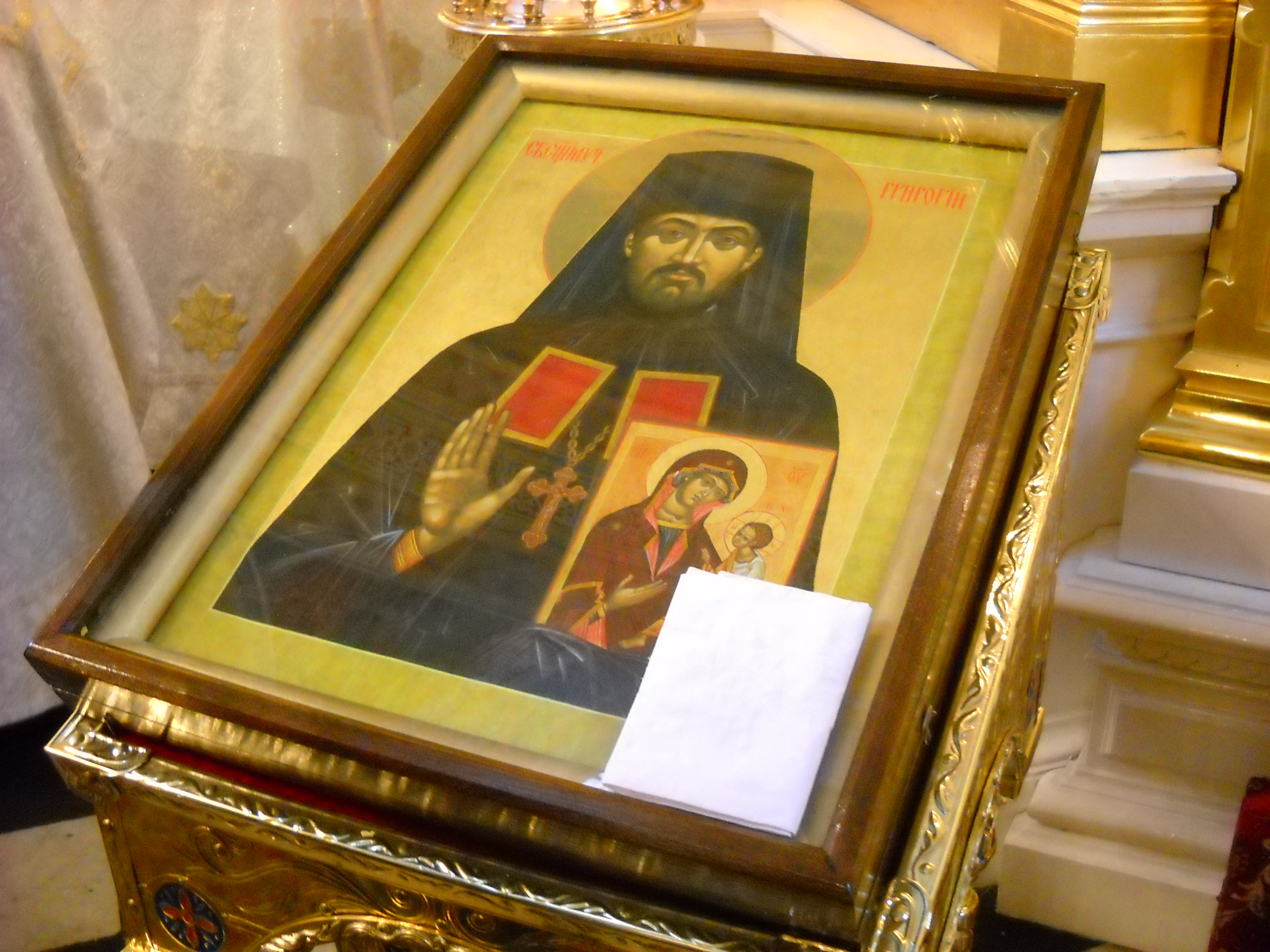
Icon of New Martyr Archimandrite Gregory (Peradze) of Georgia, in the Cathedral of St. Mary Magdalene in Warsaw.

== Sources ==
- December 6/19. Orthodox Calendar (orthochristian.com).
- December 19 / December 6. Holy Trinity Russian Orthodox Church (a parish of the Patriarchate of Moscow).
- December 6. OCA - The Lives of the Saints.
- December 6. Latin Saints of the Orthodox Patriarchate of Rome.
- The Roman Martyrology. Transl. by the Archbishop of Baltimore. Last Edition, According to the Copy Printed at Rome in 1914. Revised Edition, with the Imprimatur of His Eminence Cardinal Gibbons. Baltimore: John Murphy Company, 1916. pp. 375–376.
- Rev. Richard Stanton. A Menology of England and Wales, or, Brief Memorials of the Ancient British and English Saints Arranged According to the Calendar, Together with the Martyrs of the 16th and 17th Centuries. London: Burns & Oates, 1892. p. 587.

Greek Sources

- Great Synaxaristes: (in Greek) 6 Δεκεμβριου. Μεγασ Συναξαριστησ.
- (in Greek) Συναξαριστής. 6 Δεκεμβρίου. Ecclesia.gr. (H Εκκλησια Τησ ΕλλαδοΣσ.

Russian Sources

- (in Russian) 19 декабря (6 декабря). Православная Энциклопедия под редакцией Патриарха Московского и всея Руси Кирилла (электронная версия). (Orthodox Encyclopedia - Pravenc.ru).
- (in Russian) 6 декабря (ст.ст.) 19 декабря 2013 (нов. ст.). Русская Православная Церковь Отдел внешних церковных связей. (DECR).
