= Workers' Playtime =

Workers' or Workers Playtime may refer to:

- Workers' Playtime (radio programme), a BBC radio programme (1941–64)
- Workers Playtime (album), a music album by Billy Bragg (1988)
