= The Deviants (band) =

British rock band

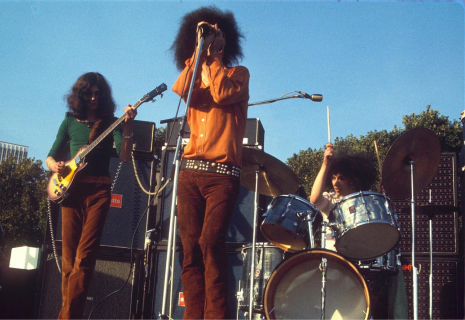
- The Deviants performing in the late '60s

Background information
- Also known as: The Social Deviants
- Origin: United Kingdom
- Genres: Psychedelic rock; freakbeat; garage rock; acid rock; proto-punk
- Years active: 1966–1969; 1977; 1984; 1996; 2002; 2011–2013
- Labels: Sire, Stiff
- Past members: Mick Farren; Pete Munro; Clive Muldoon; Mike Robinson; Benny (surname unknown); Phil Mari; Russell Hunter; Cord Rees; Ian "Sid" Bishop; Michael "MJ" McDonnell; Duncan "Sandy" Sanderson; Paul Rudolph; Andy Colquhoun; Larry Wallis; Alan Powell; Wayne Kramer; George Butler; Doug Lunn; Ric Parnell; Michael Simmons; Jack Lancaster; Garry Chamberlain; Alexander Stowell

The Deviants (formerly The Social Deviants) were a British psychedelic rock band originally active from late 1966 to 1969. The bandname was later used as a vehicle for the musical work of writer Mick Farren until his death in 2013.

Farren has stated that The Deviants were originally a community band which "did things every now and then—it was a total assault thing with a great deal of inter-relation and interdependence". Musically, Mick Farren described that they were influenced by The Who, Charles Mingus, The Velvet Underground and Frank Zappa.

== History ==
=== 1960s ===
The Social Deviants were founded by singer/writer Mick Farren in late 1966 out of the Ladbroke Grove UK Underground community, featuring Pete Munro on bass, Clive Muldoon on guitar, Mike Robinson on guitar, and Benny (surname unknown) on drums. This group played at UFO in Tottenham Court Road and opened the Alexandra Palace Love-In festival. Shortly thereafter Benny (surname unknown) was replaced by Phil Mari on drums for a few gigs. In the early months of 1967 Phil Mari left the band and was replaced by Russell Hunter (born Barry Russell Hunter, 26 April 1946, Woking, Surrey died 19 December 2023, Eastbourne, East Sussex) as permanent drummer in the group. The band then shortened their name to "The Deviants" after Pete Munro, Clive Muldoon, and Mike Robinson all left the group and were replaced by Cord Rees on bass and Sid Bishop on guitar (born Ian Bishop, 17 December 1946, Balham, South West London). With the financial backing of Nigel Samuel, the 21-year-old son of a millionaire, whom Farren had befriended, the group independently recorded their debut album Ptooff!, selling copies through the UK Underground press before it was picked up by Decca Records. This LP had been reissued on Drop Out Records (1992), Captain Trip Records (2004), Esoteric Recordings (2009), and Angel Air Records (2013); additionally, a 10" EP with excerpts from Ptooff!! was released on Alive/Total Energy Records (1996) under the name 'Social Deviants'.

Rees left the band in June 1967 to be replaced by Farren's flatmate Duncan Sanderson (born Stuart Duncan Sanderson, 31 December 1948, in Carlisle, Cumbria died 21 November 2019, Hampstead Heath, North West London) and the band released a second album Disposable through the independent label Stable Records.

When Bishop married and left the band, Farren recruited Canadian guitarist Paul Rudolph (born Paul Fraser Rudolph, 14 June 1947, in Vancouver, British Columbia, Canada) at the suggestion of Jamie Mandelkau. This band recorded and released the album The Deviants 3 through Transatlantic Records.

During a tour of North America's west coast the relationship between Farren and the musicians became personally and musically strained, and the band decided to continue without Farren, who returned to England, where he teamed up with ex-the Pretty Things drummer Twink (born John Charles Alder, 29 November 1944, in Colchester, Essex) and Steve Peregrin Took (born Stephen Ross Porter, 28 July 1949, in Eltham, South East London) to record the album Mona – The Carnivorous Circus, an album interspersed with interviews with Took and a member of the U.K Hells Angels before concentrating on music journalism. The three remaining musicians - Rudolph, Sanderson and Hunter - continued in North America for some months occasionally playing gigs there under the Deviants name, before returning to England early in 1970, and teaming up with Twink to form the Pink Fairies.

=== 1970s onward ===
In the mid-1970s, Farren was offered a one-off deal by Stiff Records to record an EP, Screwed Up, which was released under the name Mick Farren and the Deviants. The musicians on this record included Rudolph, former Pink Fairies/Motörhead guitarist Larry Wallis, former Warsaw Pakt guitarist Andy Colquhoun and former Hawkwind drummer Alan Powell. This band, without Rudolph, went on to record the album Vampires Stole My Lunch Money and the non-album single "Broken Statue", both credited to Mick Farren rather than The Deviants.

At the end of the 1970s Farren again concentrated on his writing and relocated to New York City. He would resurrect The Deviants name for occasional live performances, such as in February 1984 when he teamed up with Wayne Kramer and Wallis' band which featured Sanderson and drummer George Butler. This set was released as Human Garbage. In 2002, a new line-up of the band (featuring bassist Doug Lunn, drummer Ric Parnell and vocalist Michael Simmons) released Dr. Crow.

Farren then continued to perform and record sporadically under the name The Deviants, using a pool of musicians which include Andy Colquhoun and former Blodwyn Pig saxophonist Jack Lancaster. Eating Jello With A Heated Fork was released in 1996, credited to Deviants IXVI, followed by 2002's Dr Crow.

On 25 June 2011, after returning to live in the UK, Farren performed on the 'Spirit of 71' stage at Glastonbury Festival with 'The Last Men Standing'. The band included Andy Colquhoun and the Deviants late-1960s rhythm section of Sanderson and Hunter.

During a rare performance by The Deviants at The Borderline in Central London on 27 July 2013, Farren collapsed on stage. He died later in hospital.

== Musical style ==
Richie Unterberger of AllMusic assessed that the Deviants "were something like the British equivalent to the Fugs, with touches of the Mothers of Invention and the British R&B-based rock of the Yardbirds and the Pretty Things. Their roots were not so much in the British Invasion as the psychedelic underground that began to take shape in London in 1966-1967."

== Band members ==
Timeline

== Discography ==
=== Studio albums ===
Year	Title	Label	Format
1968	Ptooff!	Underground Impresarios	LP
1968	Disposable	Stable	LP
1969	The Deviants 3	Transatlantic	LP
1996	Eating Jello with a Heated Fork	Alive	CD
2002	Dr. Crow	Track	CD

=== Live albums ===
Year	Title	Label	Format
1984	Human Garbage	Psycho	LP
1999	Barbarian Princes	Captain Trip	CD

=== Compilation albums ===
Year	Title	Label	Format
1996	Fragments Of Broken Probes	Captain Trip	CD
1999	Have Left The Planet	Gonzo	CD
2000	This CD Is Condemned	Total Energy	CD
2001	On Your Knees, Earthlings	Total Energy	CD

=== EPs ===
Year	Title	Label	Format
1977	Screwed Up	Stiff	7"

=== Singles ===
Year	Title	Label	Format
1968	You've Got To Hold On	Stable	7"
2013	Fury of the Mob	Shagrat	7"

== Bibliography ==
- Deakin, Rich (2007). Keep it Together! Cosmic Boogie with the Deviants and Pink Fairies. UK: Headpress. ISBN 978-1-900486-61-3.
