= Mall Nukke =

Estonian artist (born 1964)

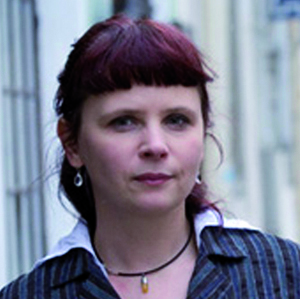
- Born: 6 December 1964 (age 61); Tallinn, then part of Estonian SSR, Soviet Union
- Known for: Painting, collage

Mall Nukke (born December 6, 1964) is an Estonian artist. A printmaker by training, she is primarily known for her paintings, collages and installations influenced by pop art. Mall Nukke emerged on the Estonian art scene in the early 1990s, her work at the period can be seen as commentary of nascent mass culture and consumer society in newly independent Estonia. Her early collages combined various cultural references and created new media characters based on real entertainers and public figures. Since the 2000s, Mall Nukke has concentrated on creating photo-manipulations and mixed media paintings inspired by Eastern Orthodox icon art.

== Life and education ==
Mall Nukke was born on December 6, 1964, in Tallinn (Estonia). She went to Children's Art School in Tallinn from 1977 to 1979, Kopli Art School, also in Tallinn, between 1981 and 1983, meanwhile attending Kivihall School of Calligraphic Art (Tallinn, from 1982 to 1983). From 1985 Mall Nukke studied at the Estonian Academy of Arts, graduating from the Department of Graphic Fine Arts in 1992 as MA. She teaches drawing at the Sally Stuudio since 1994. She is a member of the Association of Estonian Printmakers, and of the Estonian Artists' Association since 1992, member of the Estonian Painters' Association since 2009. A short documentary "Mall Nukke", was shot in 1998 by Estonian Television.

== Works ==
=== Works in collections ===
Artworks by Mall Nukke can be found at KUMU, Tartu Art Museum, OÜ Sadolin's art collection (Estonia), Rauma City Museum (Finland), Viinistu Art Museum (Estonia), Vexi Salmi art collection (Finland), Nef Gallery (Kyiv, Ukraine).

=== Exhibitions ===
Mall Nukke's art has been exhibited widely both in Estonia and abroad.

==== Solo exhibitions (selection) ====
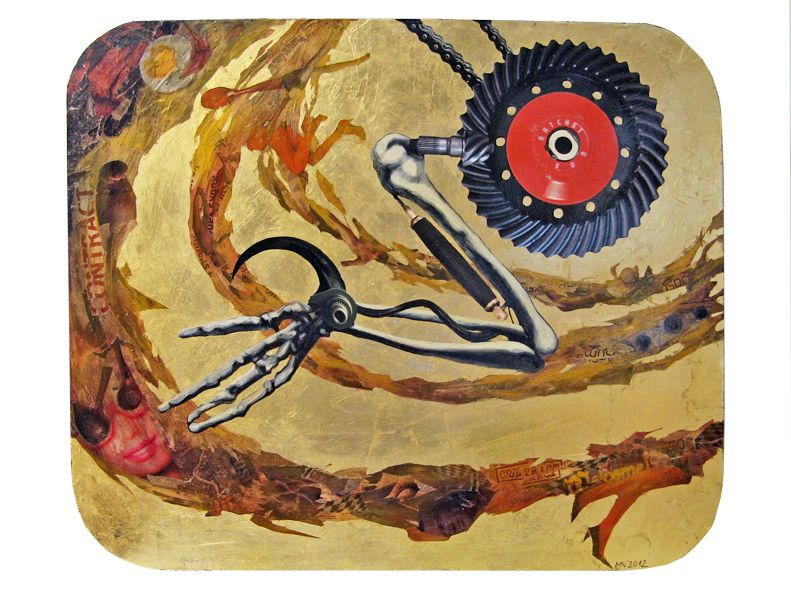
'Deus ex machina I', collage, acrylic, gilding (2012)

- 2011 "Urban Mystic 2" Tartu Art Hall Little Gallery, Estonia
- 2011 "Urban Mystic" Hobusepea Gallery, Tallinn, Estonia
- 2010 "Money Faces 2" Gallery of Parliament of Estonia, Tallinn
- 2010 "Money Faces" Haus Gallery, Tallinn, Estonia
- 2009 "Collages 1993– 2009" Artdepoo Gallery, Estonia
- 2008 "Rotation" Gallery 008, Tallinn, Estonia
- 2007 "Possibilities II" Artdepoo Gallery, Estonia
- 2006 "Possibilities" Pärnu City Gallery, Estonia
- 2005 "Urban III" Pärnu Theatre Gallery, Pärnu, Estonia

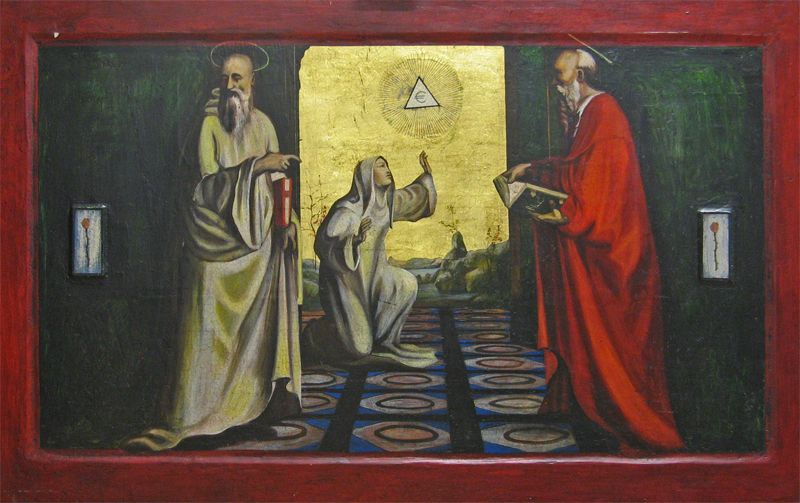
'Rising Star', oil, collage (2003)

- 2004 "Icons" Chapelle Saint-Anne, Saint-Pair-sur-Mer, France
- 2004 "Icon" Estonian Embassy in Vilnius, Lithuania
- 2004 "Icon 2004" Haus Gallery, Tallinn, Estonia
- 2004 "Urbans II" Estonian Art Academy gallery, Tallinn, Estonia
- 2003 "Urbans" Pärnu Theatre Gallery, Pärnu, Estonia

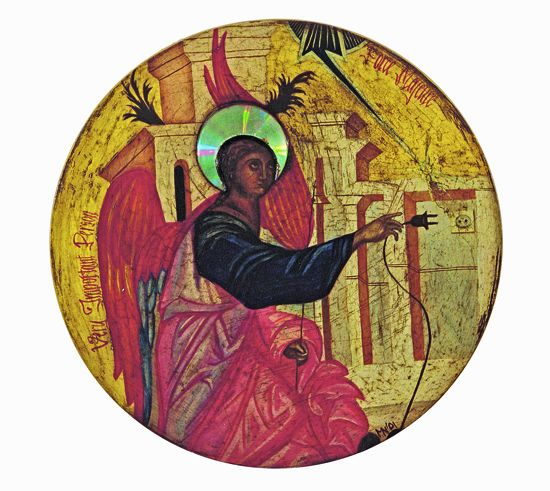
'Saint With an Object", oil, collage (2002)

- 2003 "Estonian Gold" SEB Bank Gallery, Tallinn, Estonia
- 2003 "Modern Icon" Baroti Gallery, Klaipėda, Lithuania
- 2003 "Map Tricks" Estonian Embassy gallery in Helsinki Gallery, Finland
- 2002 "Modern Icon" Lawra Gallery, Kyiv, Ukraine
- 2002 "Human & Relicts" Turtle Gallery, Viljandi, Estonia
- 2002 "Return to Parnassos" Haapsalu Town Gallery, Haapsalu, Estonia
- 2002 "20 IKOONI 02" Gallery of Parliament of Estonia, Tallinn
- 2002 "24 Iconical Moments", Estonian Art Academy Gallery, Tallinn
- 2001 "Modern Icons" ZDH, Moscow, Russia
- 2001 "Icons 2001" Estonian Embassy in Riga, Latvia
- 2000 "Estonian Egos" City Gallery, Tallinn, Estonia
- 2000 "Icons 2000" Sammas Gallery, Tallinn, Estonia
- 1998 "Playtime" Vaal Gallery, Tallinn, Estonia
- 1995 "Idols III" Gallery of Tallinn Art Hall, Tallinn, Estonia
- 1994 "Idols II" Sammas Gallery, Tallinn, Estonia
- 1994 "Drawings" Hannelore Greve Gallery, Hamburg, Germany
- 1993 "Idols I" Vaal Gallery, Tallinn, Estonia
- 1992 "Abstract Landscapes" Suomi Gallery, Stockholm, Sweden

==== Group exhibitions (selection) ====
- 2012 "Painters' Association Annual exhibition" Pärnu Contemporary Art Museum, Estonia
- 2011 "Artist and City" ZDH, Moscow, Russia
- 2011 "Abstract" EAA 11. Annual Exhibition, Tallinn Art Hall, Estonia
- 2011 "What Can You Do With White Color?" Vaal Gallery, Tallinn, Estonia
- 2011 "Golden City" Pärnu Contemporary Art Museum, Estonia
- 2010 "Convert!" Rotermann's Salt Storage, Tallinn, Estonia
- 2010 "Estonia in Berlin/Brandenburg" Kunstverein Brieselang Gallery, Germany
- 2010 "Printed Matter from Estonia" Expo 2010, Shanghai, China
- 2010 "Confrontations" EAA 10. Annual Exhibition, Tallinn Art Hall, Estonia
- 2010 "The Last Painting" Tartu Art Hall, Estonia
- 2010 "Blue" Pärnu's Contemporary Art Museum, Estonia
- 2009 "Wir aus Estland" Gallery Melnikov, Heidelberg, Germany
- 2009 "Self-exposure" EAA Annual Exhibition, Tallinn Art Hall, Estonia
- 2009 "Manu Propia" International Drawing Biennale, Gallery Atrium, Tallinn, Estonia
- 2009 "Haus-party" Haus Gallery, Tallinn, Estonia
- 2008 "Estonian Printmaking" Riga Museum of Foreign Art, Latvia
- 2008 "Art Summer" Viinistu Art Museum, Estonia
- 2008 "Vabaduse Square" Tallinn Art Hall, Estonia
- 2007 Tokyo International Screen Print Biennale, Japan
- 2007 "Impact V" International Graphic Exhibition, Rotermann Salt Storage, Estonia
- 2007 "The Best Selection" Tartu Art Hall, Estonia
- 2007 "Estonian Landscape" Tartu Snail Tower, Estonia
- 2007 "The Art of Living" Tallinn Art Hall, Estonia
- 2006 "Collected Crises" KUMU, Estonia
- 2006 "Tehnobia" Art Hall, Tallinn, Estonia
- 2005 "Now Art Now Future" Klaipeda, Lithuania
- 2005 "VII Biennale of graphics of the Baltic Countries" Kaliningrad, Russia
- 2005 "Identidiies" Tallinn Art Hall, Estonia
- 2004 "I & Other" Tallinn Art Hall, Estonia
- 2003 "Depending/Dependness" Tallinn Art Hall, Estonia
- 2002 "ZDH Gallery Fair" Dom Hudozhnikov, Moscow, Russia
- 2002 "100 Portraits" Heidelberg Castle, Germany
- 2002 "Gotland Art Summer" Roma Gallery, Gotland, Sweden
- 2002 "Four Artists/ Drawings" Estonian Art Academy Gallery, Tallinn
- 2001 "Sidestep" Pärnu City Gallery, Estonia
- 2001 "The Manning" Rotermann's Salt Storage, Tallinn, Estonia
- 2000 "Artist and God" Tallinn Art Hall, Estonia
- 2000 "The naturalism" Gallery of Tallinn Art Hall, Estonia
- 1999 "M.O.O.D." Rotermann's Salt Storage, Tallinn, Estonia
- 1998 Tallinn's XI Graphic Triennale, Rotermann's Salt Storage, Tallinn, Estonia
- 1998 "Electrokardiogramm" Rotermann's Salt Storage, Tallinn, Estonia
- 1997 "Water. Color" Rotermann's Salt Storage, Tallinn, Estonia
- 1996 "Estonia as Sign" 4. Sorose KKK Annual Exhibition, Tallinn Art Hall, Estonia
- 1996 "Sweet Home" ArtGenda. Øksnehallen, Copenhagen, Denmark
- 1995 "Estonian Printmaking" Stadsgalerie. Gouda, Netherlands
- 1994 "14th International Triennial of Small Prints" Taller Galereia Fort. Cadaque, Spain
- 1994 "3rd International Triennial of Small Prints" Chamalières, France
- 1993 "3rd Triennial of Small Prints" Riga, Latvia
- 1993 "7th International Varna Printmaking Biennial" Bulgaria
- 1993 "Estonian Art" Länsi-Keskus, Helsinki, Finland
- 1991 "Printmaking Gallery Studio" Rauma Art Museum, Rauma, Finland
- 1990 "Printmaking Gallery Studio" Estonian House, New York, United States

==== Monumental works ====
- 2010 St. Patric's pub (Vana-Posti St. in Tallinn, Estonia) panels
- 2006 St. Patric's pub ("Foorum", Narva Rd. 7 in Tallinn, Estonia) panneau "Ingel I-III"
- 2005 St. Patric's pub (Karja St. In Tallinn, Estonia) panneau
- 1997 "Hollywood II" mural painting in Club Hollywood, Tallinn, Estonia
- 1996 "Hollywood I" mural painting in Club Hollywood, Tallinn, Estonia

== Bibliography ==
=== In books ===
- "Lühike eesti kunsti ajalugu" S.Helme, J.Kangilaski 1999
- "Eesti kunstnikud/Artists of Estonia 2" J.Saar, 2000
- "Ülbed üheksakümnendad/The Nosy Nineties" S. Helme, J. Saar 2001

=== Inclusion in catalogues ===
- Foyer-Galerie des Opernhauses Halle 1993
- "Estnische Graphik" Hallescher Kunstverein E.V. 1993
- International Print Biennale Varna 1993
- Troisieme Triennale Mondiale D'Estampes Petit Format Chamalieres Auvergne France. 1994
- 15è Mini Print Internacional de Cadaqués 1995
- Estfem. Eesti feministiiku kunsti näitus, Vaal Galerii, Linnagalerii, Mustpeade Galerii. Tallinn, 1995
- Xth Vilnius Painting Triennial 1996. The Contemporary Art Center of Vilnius
- Artgenda 96. Copenhagen 96, cultural capital of Europe.
- "IIllustratiors Handwrites '96", Valik Eesti disainerite, graafikute ja illustraatorite käekirju. Muldia, 1996
- "Estonia as Sign" The Contemporary Art Center of Soros' 4. Annual Exhibition 1996
- "Color of Art" ES Sadolin AS 2002
- Tallinn XI Print Triennal, 1998
- "Shape and Form" Tallinn, 2000
- "The Nosy Nineties" S. Helme, J. Saar 2001
- "Sotheby's International Young Art" Tel Aviv 2001
- "ZDH 2002" Moscow 2002
- "Quard l'Art' Change la Baie" Normandie 2004
- "VII Baltic Graphic Triennale" Kaliningrad 2005
- "Now Art Now Future" Kaunas 2005
- 6th Annual Exhibition of Estonian Artist Association. Tehnobia. 2006
- "Art Annual Book" Pärnu 2006
- "The Meanful City" Tartu 2006
- "Estonian Landscape" Tartu 2007
- "Tokyo Screen Print Biennale" Tokyo 2007
- Estonian Artists Association Annual Exhibition "Vabaduse Square" Tallinn 2008
- "The cataloque of Estonian Lithographic Portfolio II" Tallinn 2008
- "Mall Nukke. Collages" Tallinn 2009
- "Confrontations. EAA 10. Annual Exhibition" Tallinn 2010
- "Abstract. EAA 11. Annual Exhibition" Tallinn 2011

=== Articles in newspapers (selection) ===
- Kaire Nurk, "Kollaaži kood". Sirp, 01.12. 2012 [1]
- Andri Ksenofontov, "Mall Nukke linnamüstika". Sirp, 28.01. 2011 [2]
- Andri Ksenofontov, "Euro küüned krooni näos". Sirp, 17.09. 2010 [3]
