= Mick Farren =

English journalist, author and singer (1943–2013)

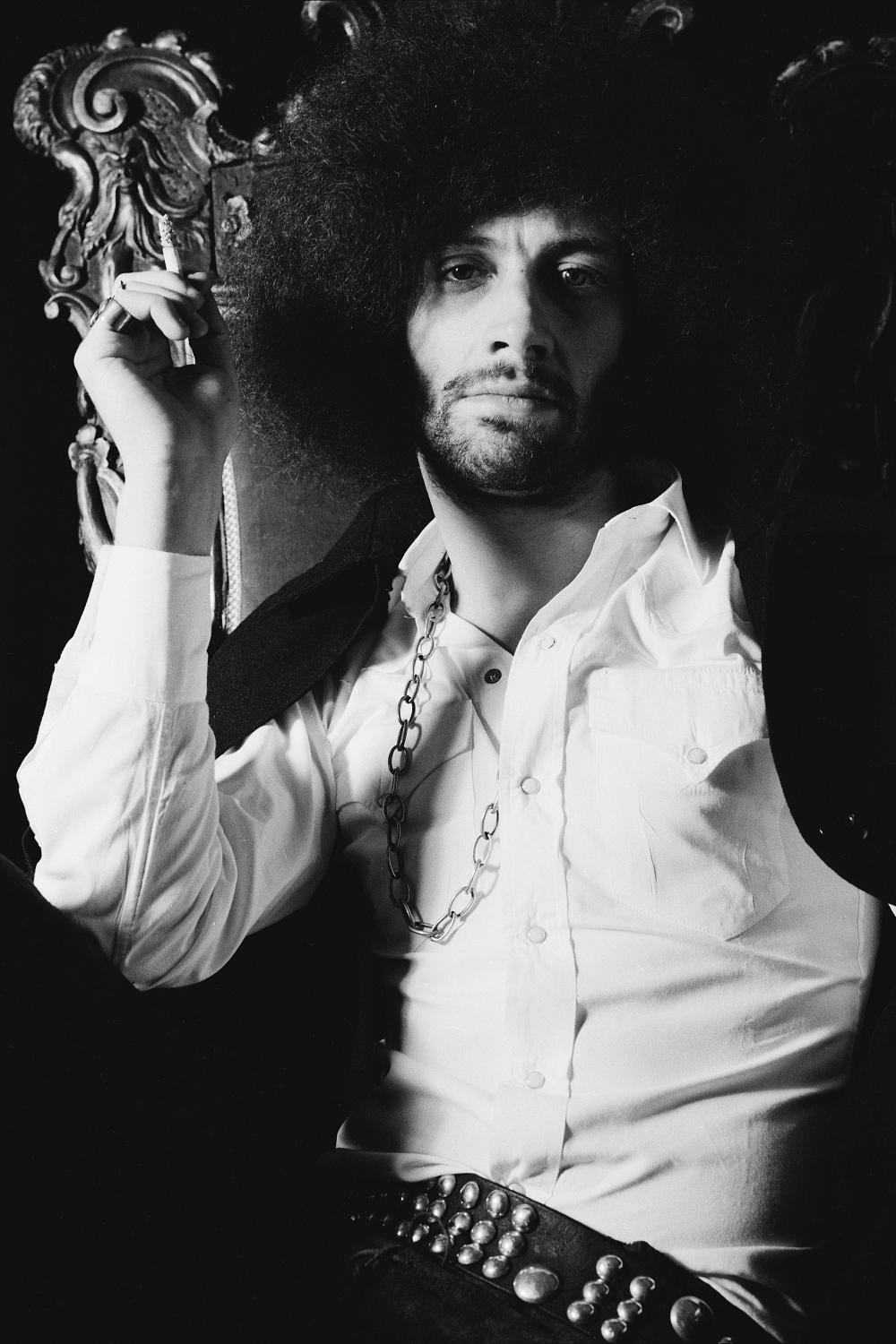
- Farren in 1970

Background information
- Born: Michael Anthony Farren; 3 September 1943; Cheltenham, Gloucestershire, England
- Died: 27 July 2013 (aged 69) London, England
- Genres: Acid rock; garage rock; proto-punk; psychedelic rock
- Occupations: Singer; journalist
- Label: Stiff

Michael Anthony Farren (3 September 1943 – 27 July 2013) was an English rock musician, singer, journalist, and author associated with counterculture and the UK underground, who had a significant influence on the development of British proto punk garage rock music.

== Early life ==
Farren was born in Cheltenham, Gloucestershire, and after moving to Worthing, Sussex, attended Worthing High School for Boys, which was a state grammar school. In 1963, he moved to London, where he studied at Saint Martin's School of Art.

== Music ==
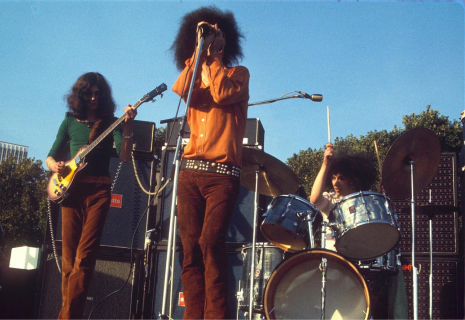
Farren performing with The Deviants

Farren was the singer with the proto-punk garage rock R&B band The Deviants between 1967 and 1969, releasing three albums. During 1970 he released the solo album Mona – The Carnivorous Circus, which also featured Steve Peregrin Took, John Gustafson and Paul Buckmaster, before ending his music business to concentrate on writing.

During the mid-1970s, he briefly revived his musical career, releasing the single "Play With Fire" featuring Marky Bell (later in The Ramones), Jon Tiven, and Doug Snyder, the EP Screwed Up, album Vampires Stole My Lunch Money and single "Broken Statue". The album featured fellow New Musical Express (NME) journalist Chrissie Hynde, Dr. Feelgood guitarist Wilko Johnson and the original Motörhead guitarist, Larry Wallis. He also contributed song ideas and music for short-lived Ladbroke Grove ensemble Warsaw Pakt's 1977 Needle Time LP.

He sporadically did musical work after that, collaborating with MC5's Wayne Kramer on Who Shot You Dutch? and Death Tongue, Jack Lancaster on The Deathray Tapes and Andy Colquhoun on The Deviants albums Eating Jello With a Heated Fork and Dr. Crow.

Aside from his own work, he provided lyrics for various musician friends over the years. He collaborated with Ian Fraser Kilmister (Lemmy), co-writing "Lost Johnny" for Hawkwind, and "Keep Us on the Road" and "Damage Case" for Motörhead. With Larry Wallis, he co-wrote "When's the Fun Begin?" for the Pink Fairies and several tracks on Wallis' solo album Death in the Guitafternoon. He provided lyrics for the Wayne Kramer single "Get Some" during the mid-1970s, and continued to work with and for him during the 1990s.

== Discography ==
=== Singles ===
Solo

- 1976 – "Play with Fire" / "Lost Johnny" (Ork records)
- 1978 – "Half Price Drinks" (Logo Records)
- 1978 – "Broken Statue" / "It's All in the Picture" (Logo records)

Other appearances

- 1968 - The Deviants – "You've Got to Hold On" / "Let's Loot the Supermarket" (Stable Records)
- 1977 – Mick Farren and The Deviants – Screwed Up EP (Stiff Records)
- 1987 – Wayne Kramer & Mick Farren – Who Shot You Dutch?
- 199? – Lunar Malice – "Gunfire in the Night" / "Touched by the Fire"

=== Albums ===
With The Deviants

Solo

- 1970 – Mona – The Carnivorous Circus (Transatlantic Records)
- 1978 – Vampires Stole My Lunch Money (Logo Records)
- 2005 – To the Masterlock – live (Captain Trip Records, Japan)

Other appearances

- 1991 – Wayne Kramer – Death Tongue (Progressive Records)
- 1993 – Tijuana Bible – Gringo Madness
- 1995 – Mick Farren and Jack Lancaster – The Deathray Tapes (Alive Records)
- 2013 – Mick Farren and Andy Colquhoun – Black Vinyl Dress

=== Compilations ===
- 1996 – Mick Farren and The Deviants – Fragments of Broken Probes
- 1996 – The Social Deviants – Garbage (Alive Records)
- 1999 – The Deviants – The Deviants Have Left the Planet
- 2000 – Mick Farren and The Deviants – This CD Is Condemned (Alive Records)
- 2001 – Mick Farren and The Deviants – On Your Knees, Earthlings (Alive Records)

== Writing ==
During the early 1970s he contributed to the UK underground press, including the International Times; he also established Nasty Tales, which he successfully defended from an obscenity charge. He later wrote for the mainstream New Musical Express, for which his work included the article "The Titanic Sails At Dawn", in which he considered the malaise afflicting then-contemporary rock music, and described the conditions that subsequently resulted in punk.

He wrote 23 novels, including the Victor Renquist novels and the DNA Cowboys sequence. His 1989 novel The Armageddon Crazy described a post-2000 United States dominated by fundamentalists who subvert the Constitution. He began writing fantasy literature in the 1970s.

Farren wrote eleven works of non-fiction, including a number of biographical (including four on Elvis Presley), autobiographical and culture books (such as The Black Leather Jacket), and much poetry.

From 2003 to 2008, he was a columnist for the weekly newspaper Los Angeles CityBeat.

In his 3 May 2010 Doc40 blog, Farren announced that he was writing another Victor Renquist novel, with the working title of Renquist V.

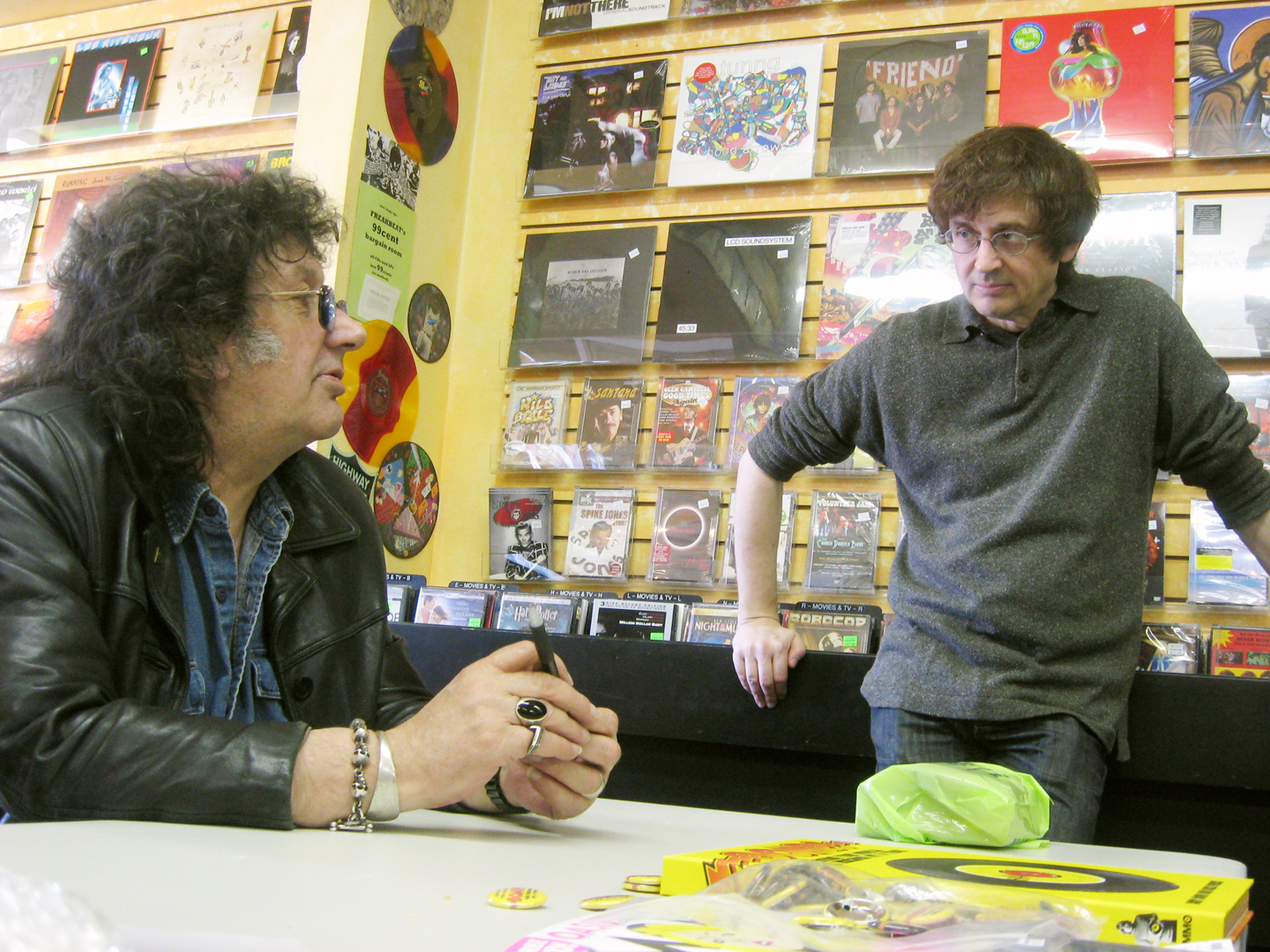
Farren in 2013

In 2013, he worked with digital imprint Ink Monkey Books on audio inserts (with Andy Colquhoun of The Deviants) for reissues of The Texts of Festival and the DNA Cowboys sequence.

== Bibliography ==
=== Fiction series ===
==== Car Warriors ====
- Back From Hell: Car Warriors #2 (1999)

==== Flame of Evil ====
1. Kindling (2004)
2. Conflagration (2006)

==== Jeb Stuart Ho ====
Also known as The DNA Cowboys Trilogy.

1. The Quest of The DNA Cowboys (1976)
2. Synaptic Manhunt (1976)
3. The Neural Atrocity (1977)
4. The Last Stand of the DNA Cowboys (1989)

==== The Victor Renquist Quartet ====
1. The Time of Feasting (1996)
2. Darklost (2000)
3. More Than Mortal (2001)
4. Underland (2002)

=== Novels ===
- The Texts of Festival (1973)
- The Tale of Willy's Rats (1974)
- The Feelies (1978)
- The Song of Phaid the Gambler (1981), reissued as:
1. Phaid the Gambler (1986)
2. Citizen Phaid (1986)
- Protectorate (1985)
- CORP*S*E (1986), aka Vickers
- Their Master's War (1987)
- Exit Funtopia (1988), aka The Long Orbit
- The Armageddon Crazy (1989) aka Armageddon Crazy
- Mars – The Red Planet (1990)
- Necrom (1991)
- Jim Morrison's Adventures in the Afterlife (1999)
- Road Movie (2012)

=== Story collections ===
- Short Stories (1972–1973) (2001)
- From the anthology – Dead Cats Bouncing, edited by Gerard Houarner and GAK, Bedlam Press (2002) a short story: Dead Cat Meets Slide
- Zones of Chaos (2009)

=== Nonfiction ===
- Watch Out Kids
- Get On Down
- Elvis in His Own Words
- The Rolling Stones in Their Own Words
- The Rock & Roll Circus
- Elvis – The Illustrated Record
- The Black Leather Jacket
- Elvis and the Colonel
- The Hitchhiker's Guide to Elvis
- The CIA Files
- Conspiracies, Lies and Hidden Agendas
- Give the Anarchist a Cigarette
- Gene Vincent: There's One in Every Town
- Words of Wisdom From the Greatest Minds of All Time
- Who's Watching You?: The Chilling Truth About the State, Surveillance and Personal Freedom
- (Who put the) Bomp! Saving the World One Record at a Time
- Zones of Chaos (an anthology)
- Speed-Speed-Speedfreak – A fast history of amphetamine

== Counterculture activity ==
Farren organised the Phun City Festival in 1970. He was long associated with the Hells Angels (UK), who provided security at Phun City; they even awarded Farren an "approval patch" in 1970 for use on his first solo album Mona.

He was a prominent activist in the White Panthers UK movement, a group that most notably organised free food and other support services for free festivals from the Windsor Free Festival onwards.

== Death ==
Farren died in 2013, aged 69, after collapsing while performing with the Deviants at The Borderline in London. The cause of death was stated to be a heart attack.
