= You Can All Join In =

Compilation album (Sampler) by Various Artists
- Released: March 1969
- Recorded: 1966–1968
- Genre: Rock
- Label: Island IWPS 2
- Producer: Various

Series chronology
You Can All Join In (1969)	Nice Enough to Eat (1969)

Professional ratings
Review scores
Source	Rating
AllMusic	4/5 stars

You Can All Join In is a budget-priced sampler album from Island Records released in 1969. Priced at 14 shillings and 6 pence (£0.72), it reached no. 18 on the UK Albums Chart.

The album is described at Allmusic.com as:

(...) one of those seamless compilations that simply cannot be improved upon. A dozen tracks highlight the best - and that is the best - of Island's recent and forthcoming output

It was combined with the follow-up, Nice Enough to Eat for a CD Re-release in August 1992 entitled Nice Enough To Join In (Island Records IMCD 150).

== Track listing ==
Side one

1. "A Song for Jeffrey" (Ian Anderson) – Jethro Tull – (Alternative mix, original version from This Was) (ILPS 9085)
2. "Sunshine Help Me" (Gary Wright) – Spooky Tooth – (from It’s All About Spooky Tooth) (ILPS 9080)
3. "I’m a Mover" (Paul Rodgers, Andy Fraser) – Free – (from Tons of Sobs) (ILPS 9089)
4. "What’s That Sound" (Stephen Stills) – Art – (from Supernatural Fairy Tales) (ILP 967)
5. "Pearly Queen" (Steve Winwood, Jim Capaldi) – Tramline – (from Moves of Vegetable Centuries) (ILPS 9095)
6. "You Can All Join In" (Dave Mason) – Traffic – (from Traffic) (ILPS 9081T)

Side two

1. "Meet on the Ledge" (Richard Thompson) – Fairport Convention – (from What We Did on Our Holidays) (ILPS 9092)
2. "Rainbow Chaser" (Alex Spyropoulos, Patrick Campbell-Lyons) – Nirvana – (from All of Us) (ILPS 9087)
3. "Dusty" – (Martyn) - John Martyn – (from The Tumbler) (ILPS 9091)
4. "I’ll Go Girl" (Billy Ritchie, Ian Ellis, Harry Hughes) – Clouds – (from Scrapbook) (ILPS 9100)
5. "Somebody Help Me" (Jackie Edwards) – Spencer Davis Group – (from The Best of the Spencer Davis Group) (ILPS 9070)
6. "Gasoline Alley" (Mick Weaver) – Wynder K. Frog – (from Out of the Frying Pan) (ILPS 9082)

== The album cover ==
Designed by Hipgnosis, the front cover photograph was taken in Hyde Park and is said to feature "every single one of the Island artistes ... bleary eyed after a party." The rear cover consists merely of a track listing and monochrome images of the covers of eight of the sampled albums (Tracks 1.1, 1.2, 1.4, 1.6, 2.1, 2.2, 2.3 & 2.6).

=== Artists shown ===
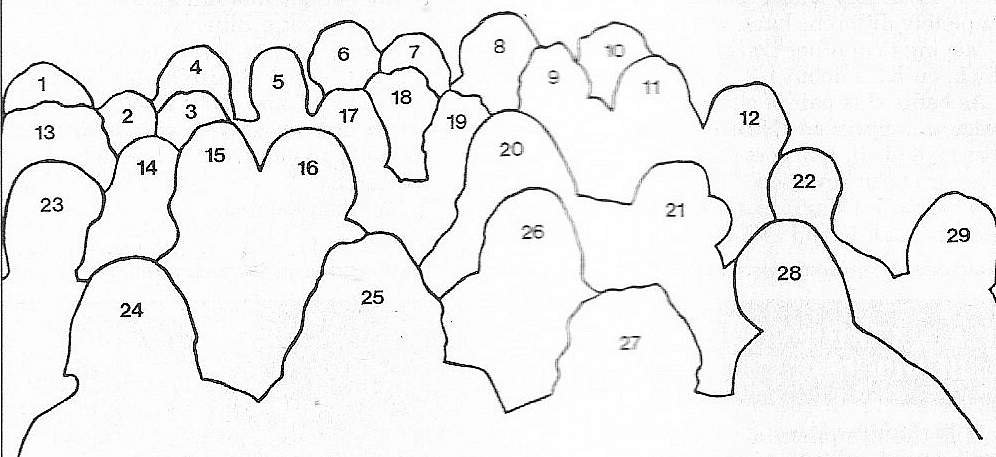
Key to artists on the cover

1. Clive Bunker
2. Neil Hubbard
3. Gary Wright
4. Glenn Cornick
5. Bruce Rowland
6. Martin Barre
7. Mick Weaver
8. Ian Anderson
9. Patrick Campbell-Lyons
10. Ashley Hutchings
11. Alex Spyropoulos
12. Chris Wood
13. Richard Thompson
14. Ian Matthews
15. Steve Winwood
16. Ian A. Anderson
17. Jim Capaldi
18. Mike Harrison
19. Martin Lamble
20. Simon Nicol
21. Harry Hughes
22. Rebop Kwaku Baah
23. Chris Mercer
24. Simon Kirke
25. Paul Rodgers
26. Billy Ritchie
27. Andy Fraser
28. Ian Ellis
29. Sandy Denny
