= Tangerine Dream (Kaleidoscope album) =

Studio album by Kaleidoscope
- Released: 24 November 1967
- Recorded: 24 February – 8 September 1967
- Genre: Psychedelic rock
- Length: 36:38
- Label: Fontana
- Producer: Dick Leahy

Kaleidoscope chronology
Tangerine Dream (1967)	Faintly Blowing (1969)

Professional ratings
Review scores
Source	Rating
Uncut	8/10

Tangerine Dream is Kaleidoscope's debut album released by Fontana Records on 24 November 1967. Despite the group’s following, good reviews and radio play it failed to reach the charts.

It is considered a classic psychedelic album and has been compared to Nirvana's The Story of Simon Simopath and Pink Floyd's The Piper at the Gates of Dawn.

== Music and lyrics ==
Bill Pearis of BrooklynVegan said: "Sporting chiming 12-string guitars and tight harmonies, they at times recall their contemporaries Pink Floyd. [...] The record also dabbles in Kinks-y tales of everyday life in “Mr Small the Watch Repair Man” and fairy tale fantasy."

Peter Daltrey, lead singer of the band, wrote the following statement about the lyrics and music of the album in the sleeve notes: "The collective subject of our songs is simple, life and people. We have written our songs about you. Happy people, sad people, lovely people and a few confused people. We have written of the children, of the king and his queen, and we have also included a few words about ourselves, about our lives, about our loves and about our dreams".

According to Daltrey, most of the songs were written in 1966 and inspired to move beyond typical romantic lyricism after having heard The Beatles' Revolver, in particular "Tomorrow Never Knows". "Mr. Small The Watch Repairer Man" was about band member Eddy Pumer's father who repaired watches, while "In The Room Of Percussion" referred to his haunted bedroom where the group would compose songs. The weird, heavy subject matter of "The Murder of Lewis Tollani" almost prevented it from being included on the album by the record company. The closing number "The Sky Children" was written in the summer of 1966 during a sunny day at the beach in Swanage. The lyrics bear a striking similarity to Donovan's "Legend of a Girl Child Linda", although that song did not see release until late August 1966 in America and June 1967 in the UK, after "The Sky Children" was allegedly written.

== Recording and release ==
The band secured a recording contract with Fontana in January 1967 and began recording at the label's Stanhope Place studio in London on February 24, 1967. Three tracks were attempted on that day, "Holidaymaker", "Kaleidoscope" and the unreleased "Cold Sunday Morning 6.15". "Holidaymaker" was initially pegged to be the debut single, but that changed when the group recorded "Flight From Ashiya" on July 12 which record executive Dick Leahy at Fontana loved, enthusing that they would be the "new Beatles". The bulk of Tangerine Dream was then recorded from August 7 to September 8, with "Flight From Ashiya" released on September 15 and the album following on November 24. Despite good reviews and underground radio play both the single and the album failed to chart, which Daltrey noted was quite deflating at the time.

== Reception ==
Bill Pearis of BrooklynVegan said: "Tangerine Dream is a lost gem of baroque psych. [...] [It] still holds up — even if lyrics like “The jester and the goldfish have joined minds above the moon” seem like pastiche today."

== Track listing ==
All songs composed by Eddy Pumer (music) and Peter Daltrey (lyrics).

Side one

1. "Kaleidoscope" – 2:13
2. "Please Excuse My Face" – 2:08
3. "Dive into Yesterday" – 4:44
4. "Mr. Small, the Watch Repairer Man" – 2:40
5. "Flight from Ashiya" – 2:38
6. "The Murder of Lewis Tollani" – 2:45

Side two

1. "(Further Reflections) In the Room of Percussion" – 3:17
2. "Dear Nellie Goodrich" – 2:45
3. "Holidaymaker" – 2:27
4. "A Lesson Perhaps" – 2:39
5. "The Sky Children" – 7:59

Bonus tracks (Repertoire 2005)

12. "Flight from Ashiya" (Mono single version) – 2:38
13. "Holiday Maker" (Mono single version) – 2:27
14. "A Dream for Julie" (Mono) – 2:45
15. "Please Excuse My Face" (Mono single version) – 2:08
16. "Jenny Artichoke" – 2:34
17. "Just How Much You Are" (Mono) – 2:11

The album was re-released in 2011 by Sunbeam records, with all the original artwork and a 12-page inner book with new photos and recording history written by Peter Daltrey.

The album was released again in 2017 on 180-gram "tangerine" orange vinyl to commemorate the album's 50th Anniversary. This pressing was a limited run of 1,000 copies hand-marked by the band and included a digital download code, along with a bonus 45 rpm single featuring the earliest recordings of "Kaleidoscope" and "A Dream for Julie"

== Personnel ==
- Peter Daltrey – vocals, keyboards
- Eddy Pumer – guitar, keyboards
- Steve Clark – bass, flute
- Dan Bridgman – drums, percussion
