= Faintly Blowing =

Studio album by Kaleidoscope
- Released: April 11, 1969
- Recorded: 1968–1969
- Genre: Psychedelic rock, folk rock
- Length: 37:44
- Label: Fontana
- Producer: Dick Leahy

Kaleidoscope chronology
Tangerine Dream (1967)	Faintly Blowing (1969)	From Home to Home (as Fairfield Parlour (1970)

Professional ratings
Review scores
Source	Rating
Allmusic	3.5/5 stars

Faintly Blowing is Kaleidoscope's second studio album released by Fontana Records in April 1969.

Though not as popular as the U.S. Kaleidoscope, this British band was also a band from the psychedelic movement with moderate domestic success, and just enough international exposure to have this album recognized in the genre's catalogue and regarded as one of the best in the same.

== Track listing ==
All songs composed by Eddy Pumer (music) and Peter Daltrey (lyrics).

Side one

1. "Faintly Blowing" - 4:06
2. "Poem"
3. "Snapdragon"
4. "Story from Tom Bitz"
5. "(Love Song) for Annie"
6. "If You So Wish"

Side two

1. "Opinion"
2. "Bless the Executioner"
3. "Black Fjord"
4. "Feathered Tiger"
5. "I'll Kiss You Once"
6. "Music" - 5:56

Bonus tracks (Repertoire 2005)

1. "Do It Again For Jeffrey"
2. "Poem" (Single Version)
3. "Balloon"
4. "If You So Wish" (Mono Single Version)
5. "Let the World Wash In" (Released As I Luv Wight)
6. "Mediaeval Masquerade" (Released As I Luv Wight)

The album was re-released in 2011 by Sunbeam records with all the original artwork and a 12 pages inner-book with new photos and recording history written by Peter Daltrey.

== Personnel ==
- Peter Daltrey – vocals, keyboards
- Eddy Pumer – guitar, keyboards
- Steve Clark – bass, flute
- Dan Bridgman – drums, percussion
