= Keyboardist =

Musician who plays keyboard instruments

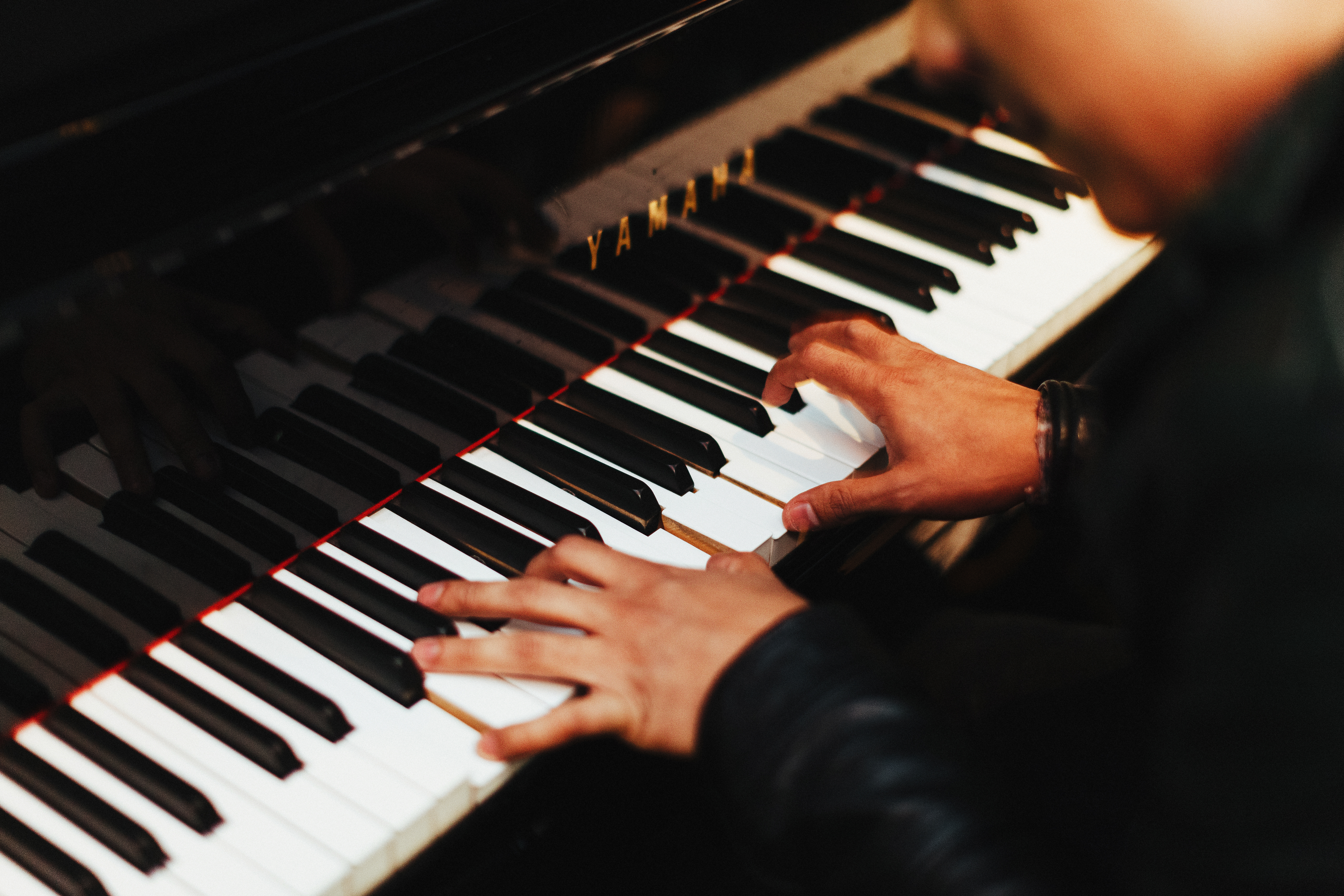
A pianist playing a piano

A keyboardist or keyboard player is a musician who plays keyboard instruments. Until the early 1960s musicians who played keyboards were generally classified as either pianists or organists. Since the mid-1960s, a plethora of new musical instruments with keyboards have come into common usage, such as synthesizers and digital piano, requiring a more general term for a person who plays them. In the 2010s, professional keyboardists in popular music often play a variety of different keyboard instruments, including piano, tonewheel organ, synthesizer, and clavinet. Some keyboardists may also play related instruments such as piano accordion, melodica, pedal keyboard, or keyboard-layout bass pedals.

== Notable electronic keyboardists ==
There are many famous electronic keyboardists in metal, rock, pop and jazz music. One list of keyboardists can be found at List of keyboardists.

The use of electronic keyboards grew in popularity throughout the 1960s, with many bands using the Hammond organ, Mellotron, and electric pianos such as the Fender Rhodes. The Doors became the first rock group to use the Moog synthesizer on a record on 1967's "Strange Days". Other bands, including the Moody Blues, the Rolling Stones and the Beatles, would go on to add it to their records, both to provide sound effects and as a musical instrument in its own right. In 1966, Billy Ritchie became the first keyboard player to take a lead role in a rock band, replacing guitar, and thereby preparing the ground for others such as Ray Manzarek, Keith Emerson and Rick Wakeman.

In the late 1960s, French musician Jean Michel Jarre, a pioneer of modern electronic music, started to experiment with synthesizers and other electronic devices. As synthesizers became more affordable and less unwieldy, many more bands and producers began using them, eventually paving the way for bands that consisted solely of synthesizers and other electronic instruments such as drum machines by the late 1970s/early 1980s. Some of the first bands that used this set up were Kraftwerk, Suicide and the Human League. Rock groups also began using synthesizers and electronic keyboards alongside the traditional line-up of guitar, bass and drums; particularly in progressive rock groups such as Yes, Genesis, Emerson, Lake & Palmer and Pink Floyd. Fleetwood Mac, who had originated as a blues rock band, moved towards pop and soft rock and became known for synthesizer-infused hits in the 1980s such as "Everywhere" and "Little Lies".

Keyboardists are often hired in cover bands and tribute bands, to replicate the original keyboard parts and other instrumental parts such as strings or horn section where it would be logistically difficult or too expensive to hire people to play the actual instruments.

== See also ==
- Pianist
- Organist
- List of Hammond organ players
- List of harpsichordists
- Classical pianists (recorded)
