= Bumpers (album) =

Compilation album by Various Artists
- Released: 1970
- Genre: Rock
- Length: 85:50
- Label: Island IDP 1
- Producer: Various

Series chronology
Nice Enough to Eat (1969)	Bumpers (1970)	El Pea (1971)

The gatefold interior

Bumpers is a double sampler album from Island Records, released in Europe and Australasia in 1970; there were minor variations in track listings within Europe but the Australian release was fundamentally different. The title refers to the basketball-style shoes on the front of the album cover and to the meaning "unusually large, abundant or excellent". The album is left to present itself: there are no sleeve notes; the gatefold interior consists of a photograph showing publicity shots of the featured acts attached to the stump of a tree on a seemingly wet and gloomy day, without any identification. This image is flanked on each side by the track listings, but even there, the information given is unreliable. Unlike its predecessors You Can All Join In and Nice Enough to Eat, there are no credits for cover art. [It was in fact by Tony Wright - his first sleeve for Island.] The English version of the album came out in two pressings, first with the pink label and "i" logo, and later with the palm motif on a white background and pink rim, each version with some minor variations in the production of individual tracks.

== UK track listing ==
=== Side One ===
1. "Every Mother's Son" (Steve Winwood) - Traffic (from John Barleycorn Must Die (ILPS 9116)) (7:06)
2. "Love" (Jess Roden) - Bronco (from Bronco (ILPS 9134)) (4:42)
3. "I Am the Walrus" (John Lennon, Paul McCartney) - Spooky Tooth (from The Last Puff (ILPS 9117)) (6:20)
4. "Jesus, Buddha, Moses, Gauranga" (Quintessence) - Quintessence (Live version of track, not released elsewhere at the time, but available as a 'bonus track' on the CD version of Quintessence, REPUK 1016) (5:15)

=== Side Two ===
1. "Thunderbuck Ram" (Mick Ralphs) - Mott the Hoople (from Mad Shadows (ILPS 9119)) (4:50)
2. "Nothing To Say" (Ian Anderson) - Jethro Tull (from Benefit (ILPS 9123)) (5:10)
3. "Going Back West" (Jimmy Cliff) - Jimmy Cliff (from Jimmy Cliff (ILPS 9133)) (5:32)
4. "Send Your Son To Die" (Mick Abrahams) - Blodwyn Pig (from Getting To This (ILPS 9122)) (4:35)
5. "Little Woman" (Dave Mason) - Dave Mason (no source listed [note: released as the B-side of WIP-6032]) (2:30)

=== Side Three ===
1. "Go Out And Get It" (John Martyn) - John & Beverley Martyn (from Stormbringer! (ILPS 9113)) (3:15)
2. "Cadence & Cascade" (Robert Fripp, Pete Sinfield) - King Crimson (from In the Wake of Poseidon (ILPS 9127)) (4:30)
3. "Reaching Out On All Sides" (Quincy, Fishman) - If (from If (ILPS 9129)) (5:35)
4. "Oh I Wept" (Paul Rodgers, Paul Kossoff) - Free (from Fire and Water (ILSP 9120)) (4:25)
5. "Hazey Jane" (Nick Drake) - Nick Drake (from his album to be released Autumn '70 [this song was released on Bryter Layter (ILPS 9134)]) (4:28)

=== Side Four ===
1. "Walk Awhile" (Richard Thompson, Dave Swarbrick) - Fairport Convention (from Full House (ILPS 9130)) (4:00)
2. "Maybe You're Right" (Cat Stevens) - Cat Stevens (from Mona Bone Jakon (ILPS 9118)) (3:00)
3. "Island" (Keith Relf, Jim McCarty) - Renaissance (from Renaissance (ILPS 9114)) (5:57)
4. "The Sea" (Sandy Denny) - Fotheringay (from Fotheringay (ILPS 9125)) (5:25)
5. "Take Me To Your Leader" (Ellis, Ritchie, Hughes) -Clouds (intended to be on their Chrysalis album to be released Autumn '70 [this song was released as a single only in France and Germany]) (2:55)

== Australian track listing ==
=== Side One ===
1. "All Right Now" (Fraser-Rodgers) - Free
2. "Notting Hill Gate" (Raja Ram-Shiva) - Quintessance
3. "Empty Pages" (Winwood-Capaldi) - Traffic (band)
4. "I'm a Man" (Winwood-Miller) - Spencer Davis Group
5. "Primrose Hill" (B. Martyn) - John and Beverley Martin

=== Side Two ===
1. "Mona Bone Jakon" (Stevens) - Cat Stevens
2. "You Really Got Me" (Davies) - Mott the Hoople
3. "Lady D'Arbanville" (Stevens) - Cat Stevens
4. "Wonderful World, Beautiful People" (J. Cliff) - Jimmy Cliff
5. "Peace in the End" (Denny-Lucas) - Fotheringay

=== Side Three ===
1. "I Am the Walrus" (Lennon-McCartney) - Spooky Tooth
2. "The Promised Land" (Quincy) - If
3. "Somewhere Down the Line" (Taylor) - Tramline
4. "Loosen Up" (Bown) - Alan Bown
5. "Crazy Man Michael" (Thompson-Swarbrick) - Fairport Convention

=== Side Four ===
1. "Wild World" (Stevens) - Jimmy Cliff
2. "Love Really Changed Me" (Miller-Grosvenor-White) - Spooky Tooth
3. "Dear Mr Fantasy" (Winwood-Capaldi-Wood) - Traffic
4. "Shiva's Chant" (Quintesswence-Stanley) - Quintessence
5. "Anthem" (Gladwin) - Amazing Blondel
