= List of Hammond organ players =

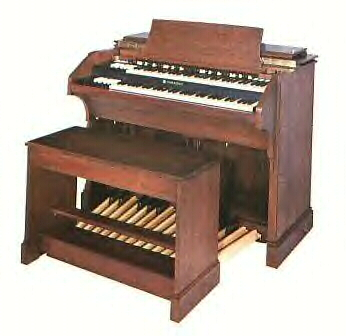
A Hammond C-3 organ

The Hammond organ is an electric organ invented by Laurens Hammond and John M. Hanert. The instrument was first manufactured in 1935. It has two manuals along with a set of bass pedals. A variety of models have been produced. The most popular is the B-3, produced between 1954 and 1974.

The instrument was designed to replace the pipe organ in churches, and early adopters included Henry Ford and George Gershwin, but it was not widely adopted for classical music. However, it was played in African American churches, and its use spread to gospel music and then to jazz in the 1950s. After usage declined in the jazz world in the 1970s, it subsequently regained its popularity in the genre and has become the second most used keyboard instrument in jazz after the piano. Jimmy Smith popularized the Hammond organ, and its technique of using drawbars and pedals.

Having found success in jazz, the Hammond organ became popular in rhythm and blues, including Booker T. & the M.G.'s and other Stax Records artists. From there, it became used in rock music, with users including Ian McLagan, Jean Alain Roussel, Matthew Fisher, Steve Winwood, Mike Finnigan, Gregg Allman and Jon Lord. It became a significant instrument in progressive rock during the early 1970s, and became a featured instrument in ska and reggae. Although the original Hammond Organ Company collapsed, it was purchased by the Suzuki Musical Instrument Corporation, who continued to manufacture the instrument using several former staff for research and development. Jazz organists, including Joey DeFrancesco and Barbara Dennerlein, have continued to feature the Hammond organ into the 21st century.

== A ==
Image	Name	Lifetime	Models played	Associated acts	Notes
	Don Airey	b. 1948	C-3; A-100	Rainbow, Ozzy Osbourne, Deep Purple	Used Jon Lord's old C-3 upon joining Deep Purple, but prefers the A-100.
	Gregg Allman	1947–2017	B-3	The Allman Brothers Band	Was given a brand new B-3 and Leslie 122RV when the band was formed.
	Tori Amos	b. 1963	B-3	Y Kant Tori Read	Played a Hammond on her 2005 album The Beekeeper.
	Rod Argent	b. 1945	B-3	The Zombies, Argent	Solo on 1972 hit single "Hold Your Head Up" cited by Rick Wakeman as "the greatest organ solo ever".
	Brian Auger	b. 1939	L-100; B-3	Julie Driscoll, The Trinity, The Oblivion Express	Played without a Leslie speaker.

== B ==
Image	Name	Lifetime	Models played	Associated acts	Notes
	Joe Bagg	b. 1967	B-3	Jeff Goldblum & The Mildred Snitzer Orchestra, Anthony Wilson	Featured on Downbeat Magazine's rising stars for organ (2011-present)
	Tony Banks	b. 1950	L-122; T-102	Genesis	Bought a L-122 when the band was formed, which was replaced by a T-102.
	Hugh Banton	b. 1949	E-100; C-3	Van der Graaf Generator	Played a Hammond E-100 organ that he personally modified with customised electronics.
	Nickey Barclay	b. 1951	TTR-100; C-3	Fanny	
	Peter Bardens	1944–2002	C-3	Shotgun Express, Camel, Van Morrison	
	Graham Bond	1937–1974		Don Rendell Quintet, Blues Incorporated, The Graham Bond Organisation	An early adopter of the Hammond in the UK, playing it on stage as early as 1962.
	James Brown	1933–2006	B-3		Used the same model for 20 years, calling it "The Godfather", and played it on sessions for other artists.
	Milt Buckner	1915–1977	B-3	The Hammond Organ Trio	Pioneered the use of the Hammond organ in jazz.
	John "Rabbit" Bundrick	b. 1948	C-3, XB-2	The Who; Free	Used a Hammond on loan from Pete Townshend when he started touring with The Who. Has since used a XB-2.
	Jerry Burke	1911–1965		Lawrence Welk	Organist for Lawrence Welk from 1934 until his death. Published several volumes of organ arrangements.

== C ==
Image	Name	Lifetime	Models played	Associated acts	Notes
	Tony Carey	b. 1953		Rainbow, Over The Rainbow	
	Felix Cavaliere	b. 1942		The (Young) Rascals, Steven Van Zandt's 'Little Steven and the Disciples of Soul', Ringo Starr's All-Starr Band	Songwriters Hall of Fame inductee
	Bill Champlin	b. 1947	Sk1-73 & B-3	Keyboard player with US band Sons of Champlin and Wunderground.	Worked with artists including Patti LaBelle, Lou Rawls, Elton John, Boz Scaggs, Donna Summer, Nancy Wilson, George Benson, Jimmy Smith, Amy Grant, Neil Diamond and Kenny Rogers
	Elbernita "Twinkie" Clark	b. 1954		The Clark Sisters	US gospel singer, composer, musician, and evangelist dubbed "The Queen of the B-3". Has performed in The Clark Sisters and as a solo artist.
	Rob Collins	1965–1996		The Charlatans	
	Tom Coster	b. 1941	B-3	Santana, John McLaughlin	
	Vincent Crane	1943–1989	C-3	The Crazy World of Arthur Brown, Atomic Rooster	
	Hank Crawford		B-3		Bought a B-3 in 1956, having already accomplished several other instruments.
	Jesse Crawford	1895–1962			A US pianist and organist who performed in the 1920s as a theatre organist for silent films. In the 1930s, he switched to the Hammond, and also used the chord organ.

== D ==
Image	Name	Lifetime	Models played	Associated acts	Notes
	Jackie Davis	1920–1999	B-3		
	Wild Bill Davis	1918–1995	C-3	Floyd Smith, Johnny Hodges	American jazz pianist, organist, and arranger.
	Lenny Dee	1923–2006	A B-3 transistor models		An American pop/easy listening/boogie-woogie/jazz organist whose career spanned six decades and 56 albums; he had a Top 20 hit in 1955 with "Plantation Boogie". Used various tonewheel and transistor Hammonds, and was a strong critic of the company.
	Joey DeFrancesco	1971-2022	B-3, New B-3		An American jazz organist and trumpeter. Down Beat's 2003 Critics Poll selected him as "top jazz organist". Mentored by Jimmy Smith, he has performed with Miles Davis and John McLaughlin and Van Morrison.
	"Papa" John DeFrancesco	1940-2024	B-3		Father of Joey DeFrancesco.
	Barbara Dennerlein	b. 1964	B-3		Has achieved particular critical acclaim for use of the bass pedals, and mixing the Hammond with samples. Has won the Down Beat "Talent Deserving of Wider Recognition" title five times, and is a three-time recipient of the German Critics Award.
	Bill Doggett	1916–1996		Billy Butler	Co-wrote and recorded the instrumental "Honky Tonk" in 1956.
	Tyrone Downie	1956–2022		Bob Marley and the Wailers	Featured on "No Woman, No Cry" on the album Live!

== E ==
Image	Name	Lifetime	Models played	Associated acts	Notes
	Charles Earland	1941–1999	B-3	Grover Washington, Jr.	
	Keith Emerson	1944–2016	L-100; C-3	The Nice / Emerson, Lake & Palmer / Emerson, Lake & Powell	Infamously abused a L-100 on stage, sticking knives in the instrument.
	Bobby Espinosa	1949–2010	B-3	El Chicano	Inducted into the "Hammond Heroes" society. At the time, had the distinction of being the only Latin organist recognized for his blues, Latin and jazz style.
	John Evan	b. 1948	C-3	Jethro Tull	

== F ==
Image	Name	Lifetime	Models played	Associated acts	Notes
	Georgie Fame	b. 1943	M-100	Georgie Fame and the Blue Flames	Pioneer of British rhythm and blues through his performances at the Flamingo Club, London in the mid-1960s.
	Danny Federici	1950–2008	B-3	Bruce Springsteen's E Street Band	
	Mike Finnigan	1945–2021	B-3	Jimi Hendrix, Les Dudek, Taj Mahal, The Phantom Blues Band	
	Matthew Fisher	b. 1946	M-102	Procol Harum	Co-wrote and recorded "A Whiter Shade of Pale".
	Henry Ford	1863–1947	A		

== G ==
Image	Name	Lifetime	Models played	Associated acts	Notes
	Mick Gallagher	b. 1945	C-3	Ian Dury, The Blockheads, The Animals, Peter Frampton, The Clash	
	George Gershwin	1898–1937	A		
	Larry Goldings	b. 1968	B-3	Maceo Parker, Peter Bernstein	
	Dave Greenfield	(1949–2020)	L-100	The Stranglers	
	Dave Greenslade	(1943–2026)		Colosseum; Greenslade	Focused on Hammond organ in Greenslade while Dave Lawson played synthesizers.

== H ==
Image	Name	Lifetime	Models played	Associated acts	Notes
	Bo Hansson	1943–2010		Hansson & Karlsson	A jam session featuring Hansson with Jimi Hendrix has been widely bootlegged.
	Atsuko Hashimoto	b. 197?	B-3 with one or two Leslie speakers	Jeff Hamilton, Yutaka Hashimoto (jazz guitarist)	Plays in jazz trios with a drummer and either a saxophonist or a guitarist.
	Alexander Hawkins	b. 1981			As part of the trio Decoy.
	Isaac Hayes	1942–2008	B-3	Stax Records	Used on Hot Buttered Soul.
	Cory Henry	b. 1987	B-3	Cory Henry & The Funk Apostles	
	Ken Hensley	1945-2020	B-3	Uriah Heep	
	Milt Herth	1902–1969			
	Christopher Holland	b. 196?			Brother of Jools Holland.
	Richard "Groove" Holmes	1931–1991	B-3, X-77, Concorde	Gene Ammons, Les McCann, Gerald Wilson	
	John Hondorp	b. 1964	A-100, B-3, HX-3	Unit Records	

== I ==
Image	Name	Lifetime	Models played	Associated acts	Notes
	Doug Ingle	b. 1945		Iron Butterfly	Started with a Vox organ and later moved to Hammond.

== J ==
Image	Name	Lifetime	Models played	Associated acts	Notes
	Booker T. Jones	b. 1944	M-1, M-3, B-3	Booker T. & the M.G.'s, The Mar-Keys, Otis Redding, Stephen Stills, Dirty Dozen Brass Band, Drive By Truckers, Rancid	Played a M-3 on the 1962 R&B hit "Green Onions".
	Melvyn "Deacon" Jones	1943–2017	B-3	Baby Huey & the Babysitters, The Impressions band, Freddie King band, John Lee Hooker band	
	John Paul Jones	b. 1946	M-100, C-3, SK-1	Led Zeppelin	English multi-instrumentalist, best known as a bass player
	Lonnie Jordan	b. 1948	B-3	Eric Burdon, War	

== K ==
Image	Name	Lifetime	Models played	Associated acts	Notes
	Tony Kaye	b. 1946	M-100; C-3	Yes, Badger, David Bowie	
	Al Kooper	b. 1944		Bob Dylan / Super Session / Blood, Sweat & Tears	Played a Hammond on Dylan's "Like a Rolling Stone".
	Joe Krown	b. 1962	A-100, B-3, XK-2	Clarence "Gatemouth" Brown	Played with Brown from 1992 to 2005.

== L ==
Image	Name	Lifetime	Models played	Associated acts	Notes
	Robert Lamm	b. 1944	B-3	Chicago	
	Eddie Layton	1925–2004			Promoted the Hammond as a touring demonstrator, and played the organ at old Yankee Stadium for nearly 40 years.
	Ron Levy	b. 1951	B-3	B.B. King band, Roomful of Blues, Ron Levy's Wild Kingdom	
	Jon Lord	1941–2012	C-3	The Artwoods, Deep Purple, Whitesnake	Founding member of Deep Purple, played a C-3 through a Marshall amplifier.
	Eddy Louiss	1941–2015		Jean-Luc Ponty	

== M ==
Image	Name	Lifetime	Models played	Associated acts	Notes
	Ray Manzarek	1939–2013	C-3	The Doors	Used a C-3 on L.A. Woman and the band's post-Jim Morrison career.
	Hank Marr	1927–2004	C-3, B-3; X-66	Rusty Bryant	
	Page McConnell	b. 1963	B-3	Phish	
	Jack McDuff	1926–2001	B-3	Willis Jackson	Also known as "Brother" Jack McDuff. An early collaborator with George Benson.
	Jimmy McGriff	1936–2008	B-3	Hank Crawford	
	Goldy McJohn	1945–2017	M-3, B-3	Steppenwolf	
	Ron "Pigpen" McKernan	1945–1973	B-3	Grateful Dead	Upgraded from a Vox Continental to a B-3 in 1968.
	Ian McLagan	1945–2014	M-100	Small Faces, Faces, Rolling Stones	
	Christine McVie	1943-2022	B-3	Played a chopped and customised B-3 on tour	Chicken Shack, Fleetwood Mac
	John Medeski	b. 1965	B-3	Medeski Martin & Wood, John Scofield	
	Lee Michaels	b. 1945	B-2		Often played as a duo, with the Hammond covering all sounds except drums.
	Money Mark			Beastie Boys	
	Brent Mydland	1952–1990	B-3	Grateful Dead	

== N ==
Image	Name	Lifetime	Models played	Associated acts	Notes
	Christopher North	b. 1951	B-3	Ambrosia	

== O ==
Image	Name	Lifetime	Models played	Associated acts	Notes
	Spooner Oldham	b. 1943	B-3	FAME Studios, Muscle Shoals Rhythm Section, Dan Penn, Neil Young	On The Box Tops' "Cry Like a Baby" and on Keith Richards' Crosseyed Heart.
	Mike Oldfield	b. 1953			On Tubular Bells, and Tubular Bells II.

== P ==
Image	Name	Lifetime	Models played	Associated acts	Notes
	Don Patterson	1936–1988	B-3	Booker Ervin, Sonny Stitt	
	Big John Patton	1935–2002	B-3	Grant Green	
	Sonny Phillips	b. 1936	B-3	Gene Ammons, Houston Person	
	Billy Preston	1946–2006	B-3	The Beatles, The Rolling Stones, Eric Clapton	
	Alan Price	b. 1942		The Animals, Alan Price Set	Started off with a Vox Continental organ.

== R ==
Image	Name	Lifetime	Models played	Associated acts	Notes
	Doug Riley	1945–2007		Famous People Players	Known as "Dr. Music".
	Billy Ritchie	b. 1944		'1–2–3', Clouds	
	Gregg Rolie	b. 1947	B-3	Santana, Journey	Two-time inductee of the Rock and Roll Hall of Fame.

== S ==
Image	Name	Lifetime	Models played	Associated acts	Notes
	Merl Saunders	1934–2008	B-3, XB-2	Jerry Garcia	
	Rhoda Scott	b. 1938	B-3, B-3000 (custom model)		
	Shirley Scott	1934–2002	B-3	Eddie "Lockjaw" Davis, Stanley Turrentine	
	Paul Shaffer	b. 1949	B-3	Saturday Night Live (SNL), The Blues Brothers, David Letterman	Beginning in 1982 through 2015 (33 years), Shaffer served as musical director/band leader for David Letterman's late night talk shows.
	Dave Sinclair	b.1947	A-100	Caravan	Used a fuzz-box to achieve distorted guitar-like sound on solos.
	Ethel Smith	1902–1996	A		Known as "The First Lady of the Hammond Organ".
	Jimmy Smith	1925–2005	B-3	Wes Montgomery	His 1950s Blue Note recordings inspired countless organists of the 1960s and 1970s.
	Johnny "Hammond" Smith	1933–1997	B-3	Houston Person	
	Lonnie Smith	1942–2021	B-3	George Benson, Lou Donaldson	
	Mark Stein	b. 1947	B-3	Vanilla Fudge	
	Dave Stewart	b. 1950	L-100	Egg, Hatfield and the North, National Health, Bruford	

== T ==
Image	Name	Lifetime	Models played	Associated acts	Notes
	James Taylor		B-3	The Prisoners, James Taylor Quartet (JTQ)	Credited with popularising the Hammond organ in acid jazz.

== V ==
Image	Name	Lifetime	Models played	Associated acts	Notes
	Earl Van Dyke	1930–1992	B-3	The Funk Brothers, Fred Jackson, Ike Quebec	Backed many "hits" for the Motown Records label.
	Thijs van Leer	b. 1948	L-100; XB-3	Focus	

== W ==
Image	Name	Lifetime	Models played	Associated acts	Notes
	Cherry Wainer	1935–2014		Lord Rockingham's XI	Hammond customised with quilted white-leather and diamanté studs.
	Rick Wakeman	b. 1949	L-100; C-3	Yes, Strawbs, English Rock Ensemble	
	Fats Waller	1904–1943	A		Started his career on pipe organ, then became an early adopter of the Hammond.
	Walter Wanderley	1932-1986	L-100; B-3	Soloist, Astrud Gilberto	Brazilian organist best known for his lounge and bossa nova music and for his instrumental version of the song Summer Samba which became a worldwide hit.
	Peter Weltner	b. 1952	New B-3	soloist, organ-drums duo	
	Steve Winwood	b. 1948	C-3, B-3	The Spencer Davis Group, Traffic, Blind Faith	
	Rick Wright	1943–2008	M-100; C-3	Pink Floyd	Founding member of Pink Floyd, upgraded from a Farfisa Compact Duo to a M-100 on stage in 1970.
	Winston Wright	1944–1993		Tommy McCook's Supersonics, Harry J Allstars	Acknowledged as Jamaica's master of the Hammond organ.
	Klaus Wunderlich	1931–1997	C-3, H-100		Played the C-3, then in the mid 1960s changed to model H-100. He later combined the sound of the H-100 with a Lowrey Organ Model H25-3 and Wersi model W248S which was called the "New Pop Organ Sound".

== Y ==
Image	Name	Lifetime	Models played	Associated acts	Notes
	Larry Young	1940–1978	B-3	Tony Williams' Lifetime	
