= Daltrey =

Daltrey may refer to:

- Roger Daltrey (born 1944), English singer, musician and actor
  - Daltrey (album), 1973
- Daltrey (surname)
