= The Fog Band =

English rock band

- Origin: Bath, England
- Genres: Indie, garage rock, mod revival, garage punk
- Years active: 2000–2006
- Labels: Purr Records
- Past members: Bobby Grindrod, Oli Daltrey, Chris Genner, Mark Rutter, Gary Martin
- Website: [www.myspace.com/thefogband]

The Fog Band were an English garage punk/indie rock act from Bath, Somerset, England, that existed between 2000 and 2006 and were fronted by Bobby Grindrod. Originally instrumental, the band's lead guitarist (Oli Daltrey – son of Peter Daltrey, lead singer of 1960s psychedelic band, Kaleidoscope) persuaded Grindrod (a student at Bath School of Art and Design) to be their vocalist after being intrigued by his unusual appearance. Although somewhat reluctant, Grindrod agreed after a period of intense insistence. He later claimed that:

"I only joined to stop Oli pestering me, but when we found ourselves supporting the likes of The Futureheads, Art Brut, The Buff Medways, The Dirtbombs, Neil's Children and The 5.6.7.8's, I realised that I'd definitely need more ties".

Although Grindrod was lead singer, one BBC review suggested that he was "clearly the monkey to lead guitarist Olly (sic) Daltrey's organ grinder". However a rare and fascinating union had resulted between the two that capitalised on Daltrey's songwriting prowess and Grindrod's unique persona and vocal style.

Initially, Grindrod's vocal approach was heavily influenced by 1960s Rhythm and blues but as the band progressed he began to experiment with a 'cleaner' sound. Daltrey began to accommodate this development in later songs like 'The Cummerbund Years' and an exciting future beckoned. For the most part, however, the music was heavily indebted to 1960s soul, beat music, garage rock and proto-punk bands like the MC5 and The Stooges as well as new wave. The band's growing reputation and cult following was due in equal parts to Grindrod's ultra sharp mod appearance and charisma, their tight instrumentation, memorable songs and energetic live performances. Live favourites included a rousing, souped-up cover of Nancy Sinatra's "These Boots Are Made For Walking".

The attention of local indie record label Purr Records was attracted and the band released their first (and only) EP The Law of The Sea in 2005. This received critical acclaim in the underground music press with Artrocker magazine calling it "excellent jerky new wavery from Bath's finest" and Rolling Stone awarding it four and a half stars out of five. One of the tracks included was a cover of R. Dean Taylor's 1967 Motown hit "There's A Ghost in My House", that celebrated their soul and garage rock influences. The EP's title track referenced songs by Ray Charles and John Lee Hooker.

Although they garnered critical acclaim and were tipped to cross into the public consciousness from their underground following, the band inexplicably ground to a halt in early 2006. Grindrod has since gone on to front Friends of The Bride, while Daltrey still writes and performs with his lo-fi outfit, Gentlemen's Relish (featuring ex-Fog Band drummer, Gary Martin, on bass).
