= Nice Enough to Eat =

Compilation album by Various Artists
- Released: November 1969
- Genre: Rock
- Length: 55:22
- Label: Island IWPS 6
- Producer: Various

Series chronology
You Can All Join In (1969)	Nice Enough to Eat (1969)	Bumpers (1970)

Nice Enough to Eat is a budget priced sampler album released by Island Records in 1969.

Continuing the policy set by its predecessor You Can All Join In, the album presented tracks from the latest albums by established artists including Free, Traffic, and Jethro Tull, and introduced tasters from newer signings to the label, notably Nick Drake and King Crimson. The inclusion of the Nick Drake track, "Time Has Told Me", has been credited with providing the first opportunity for many record buyers to hear Drake's music.

It was priced as low as 14 shillings and 6 pence (£0.72), less than half of the standard album price at the time. The album is described at Allmusic.com as a "somewhat incoherent sampler of folk-rock, prog rock, and prog-tinged hard rock", but with a "stellar artist lineup".

It was combined with You Can All Join In for a CD re-release in August 1992 entitled Nice Enough To Join In (Island Records IMCD 150), but omitting tracks 1, 4 (side one) and 4 (side two).

== Track listing ==
=== Side one ===
1. "Cajun Woman" (Thompson) – Fairport Convention – (from Unhalfbricking (ILPS 9102)) - 2:41
2. "At the Crossroads" (Sahm) – Mott the Hoople – (from Mott the Hoople (ILPS 9108)) - 5:28
3. "Better By You, Better Than Me" (Wright) – Spooky Tooth – (from Spooky Two (ILPS 9098)) - 3:29
4. "We Used to Know" (Anderson) - Jethro Tull – (from Stand Up (ILPS 9103)) - 3:58
5. "Woman" (Fraser/Rodgers) – Free – (from Free (ILPS 9104)) - 3:45
6. "I Keep Singing That Same Old Song" (Gibson) – Heavy Jelly – Island 7" (b/w "Blue") (WIP 6049) - 8:19

=== Side two ===
1. "Sing Me a Song That I Know" (Abrahams) – Blodwyn Pig – (from Ahead Rings Out (ILPS 9101))- 3:04
2. "(Roamin' Thro' the Gloamin' With) Forty Thousand Headmen" (Winwood/Capaldi) – Traffic – (from Best of Traffic) (ILPS 9112)) - 3:12
3. "Time Has Told Me" (Drake) – Nick Drake – (from Five Leaves Left (ILPS 9105)) - 4:23
4. "21st Century Schizoid Man" (Fripp/McDonald/Lake/Giles/Sinfield)– King Crimson – (from In the Court of the Crimson King (ILPS 9111)) - 7:20
5. "Gungamai" (Rothfield/Shankar/Bhava) – Quintessence – (from In Blissful Company (ILPS 9110Q)) - 4:17
6. "Strangely Strange But Oddly Normal" (Pawle) – Dr. Strangely Strange – (from Kip of the Serenes (ILPS 9106)) - 4:26

== Cover ==
The cover was designed by Mike Sida, who had already provided the cover for Spooky Two, and went on to produce several further classic Island album covers including Free's Fire and Water and Traffic's John Barleycorn Must Die. The front cover's simple motif of names of featured bands spelt out in alphabet sweets (in a combination of blue/biscuit colours alone) is subverted on the rear cover, where most of the letters have been dispersed and replaced by what seem to be brightly coloured tablets.
The rear cover also features the track listing and thumbnail images of eight of the featured albums (1.1-4, 2.1, 2.3-4 & 2.6).
