= Rock opera =

Rock music with a story told over multiple parts

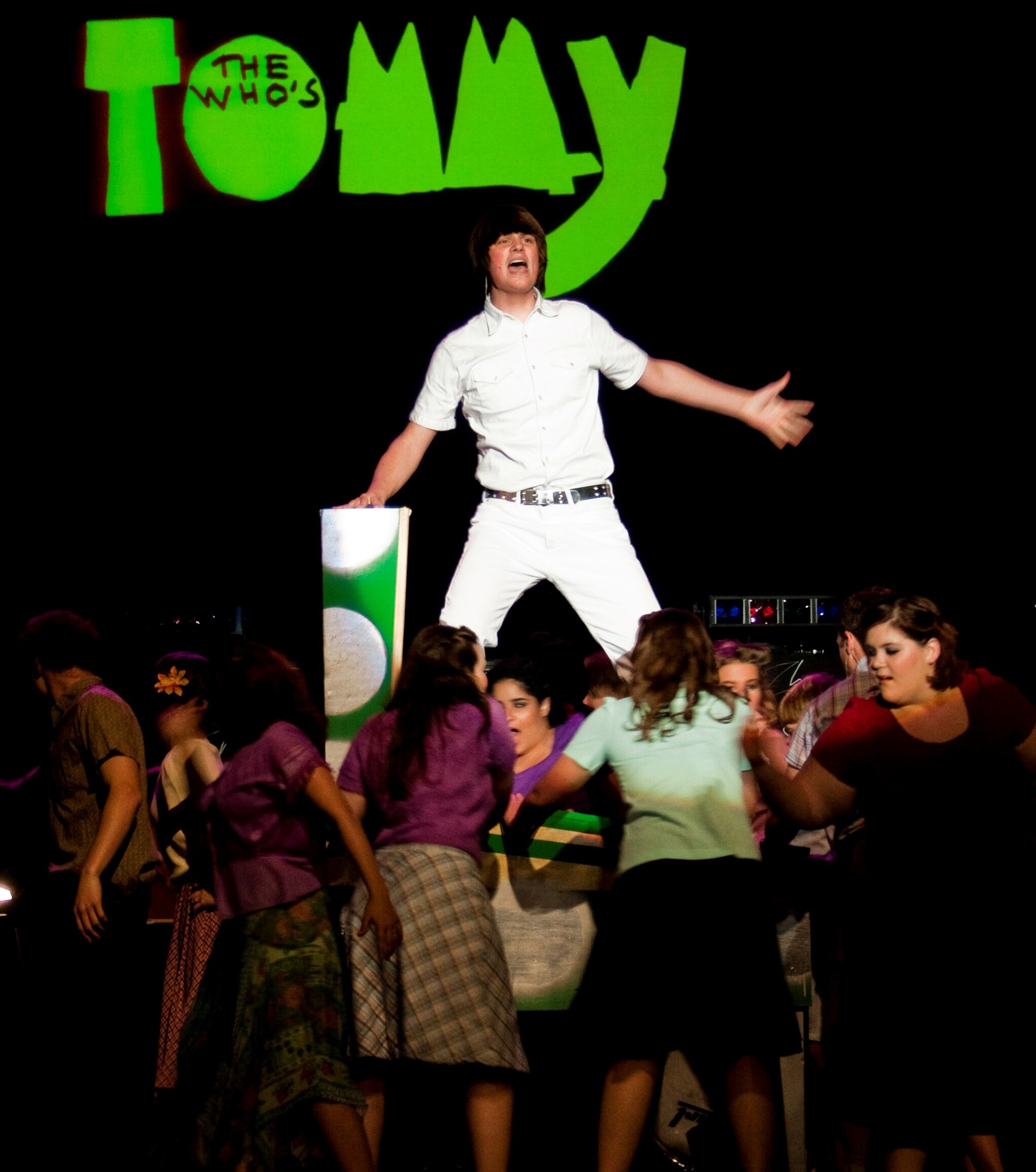
Stage adaptation of The Who's album Tommy; rock operas may be produced by recording artists, in which case they may be released as concept albums, or by theatre-oriented songwriters for staged production

A rock opera is a collection of rock music songs, especially a concept album, with lyrics that relate to a common story. The use of various character roles within the song lyrics is a common storytelling device. The success of rock opera has inspired similar works in other musical styles, such as rap opera.

Unlike classical opera, rock operas are typically not scripted for theatrical production, similar to a classical oratorio, though some have been adapted as rock musicals.

== History ==
=== 1960s and Origins ===
A number of rock artists became interested in the idea of creating a rock opera in the 1960s. An early use of the term "opera" in the context of rock music dates from 1963, when Frank Zappa said "We're preparing the world's first rock and roll teen-age opera for [CBS]" to describe a work in progress, I Was a Teenage Malt Shop. Zappa can be heard discussing his opera in a radio program: a recording of which is included on the album Joe's Xmasage, on the track The Uncle Frankie Show. Don Van Vliet was to be cast as a character named "Captain Beefheart". Zappa abandoned the project in 1964 after a demo tape with a few of the songs was rejected by CBS. In 1967 The Mothers of Invention's second album Absolutely Free (recorded in 1966), included two "underground oratorios" Absolutely Free and The M.O.I American Pageant (with librettos available by mail order), composed, arranged, and conducted by Frank Zappa. Some of the songs from I Was a Teenage Malt Shop appeared in the oratorio The M.O.I. American Pageant (e.g. "Status Back Baby") and other songs from the uncompleted opera appeared on later albums (e.g. I Was a Teen-age Malt Shop on the album Mystery Disc and My Guitar Wants to Kill your Mama on the album Weasels Ripped My Flesh). In 1979, Zappa wrote and produced the rock opera Joe's Garage.

Another early use of the term, the July 4, 1966, edition of RPM Magazine (published in Toronto) reported that "Bruce Cockburn and Mr [William] Hawkins are working on a Rock Opera, operating on the premise that to write you need only 'something to say'." Mark Wirtz explored the idea in a project A Teenage Opera, from which an early song "Excerpt from A Teenage Opera (Grocer Jack)" recorded by Keith West was released and became a hit song in 1967. However, the album for the rock opera was not released until 1996, and it was only fully realised and staged in 2017.

The Story of Simon Simopath: A Science Fiction Pantomime is the debut album by the British band Nirvana, and an early concept album from 1967. Songwriters Patrick Campbell-Lyons and Alex Spyropoulos formed Nirvana as a vehicle to perform their songs live. A short story on the album's back cover helps tie the songs together in a narrative that some consider an early example of a rock opera. The tale follows the life of Simon Simopath, a lonely boy who wanted to grow wings and fly. One reviewer dismissed the "silly story" but described the songs as a "uniformly solid set of well-constructed psych-pop tunes with attractive melodies and rich, semi-orchestrated arrangements." Another critic cites Donovan, The Incredible String Band, and Pet Sounds-era Beach Boys, as well as rock, pop, folk, baroque, and classical music as influences. Nirvana had limited commercial success with Simon Simopath.

The Pretty Things released their album S. F. Sorrow in 1968, regarded by many as the first rock opera. The story follows the life of Sebastian F. Sorrow, from his birth on a starless night, to his disillusioned old age. Vocalist and lyricist, Phil May, said he had not heard of Nirvana or The Story of Simon Simopath at that time. Although the album was a progressive and innovative effort with well-crafted songs, it was not a commercial success and did not chart. The band's record label, EMI, provided little support for the album, did not promote it as a rock opera, and released it in Great Britain soon after the release of The Beatles' White Album and The Rolling Stones' Beggars Banquet which overshadowed S.F. Sorrow. Additionally, the relatively complicated studio production could not be replicated in live performances at that time and there was no tour for the album. It was not released in the US until 1969, months after the release of The Who's Tommy.

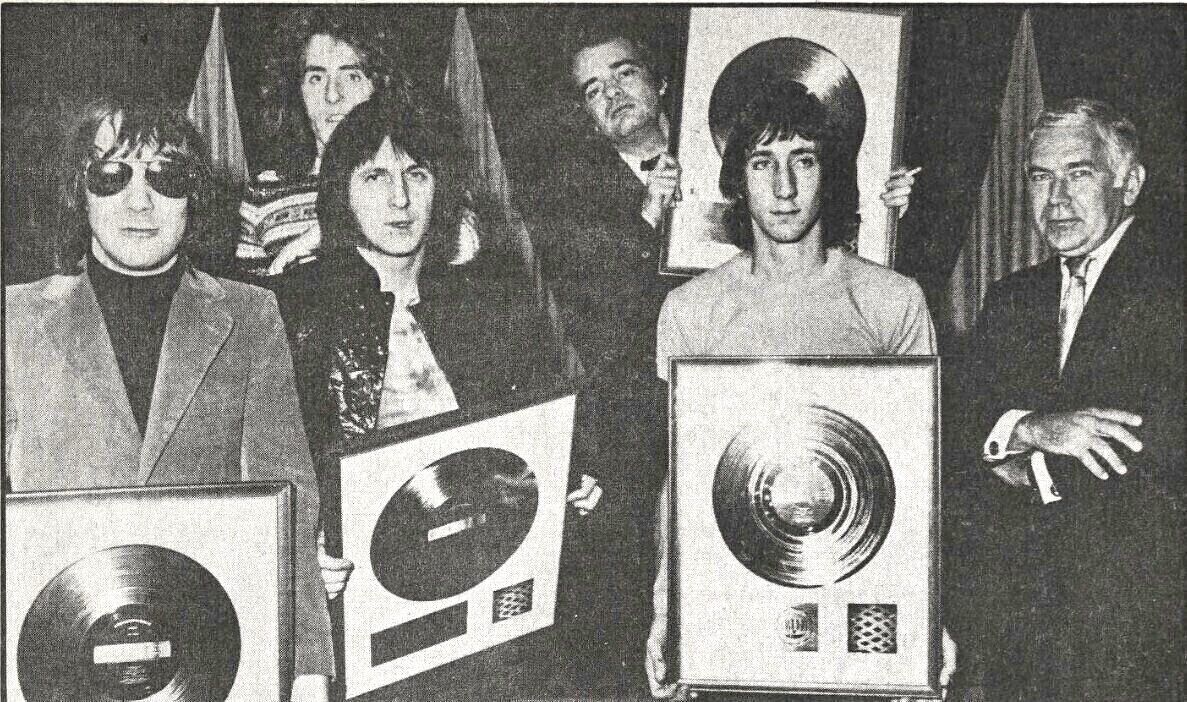
The Who and manager Kit Lambert with gold records for Tommy

The Who's double album Tommy, released in May of 1969, was the first fully realized record to be explicitly billed as a rock opera. It was both a commercial and critical success. The album tells the story of Tommy Walker, a "deaf, dumb and blind kid." Tommy displays the titular character's experiences with life and his relationship with his family. Although the band's songwriter and guitarist Pete Townshend denied taking any influence from S.F. Sorrow, critics have compared Tommy to it. The Tommy album developed into other media, including a Seattle Opera production in 1971, an orchestral version by Lou Reizner in 1972, a film 1975, and a Broadway musical in 1992. The original album has sold 20 million copies and has been inducted into the Grammy Hall of Fame. The Who had previously explored the concept of a rock opera in 1966, with their nine minute, six-movement track A Quick One, While He's Away sometimes referred to as a “mini-rock opera”. The Who released a second rock opera, Quadrophenia in 1973.

The Kinks made significant contributions to the genre. Arthur (Or the Decline and Fall of the British Empire), written by Ray Davies, was initiated in January of 1969 as the soundtrack for a Granada Television play in collaboration with Julian Mitchell. Although the television production never came to fruition, the album was released independently in October 1969, but it was largely overshadowed by the success of The Who's Tommy which preceded Arthur by five months. Arthur, vaguely reflecting some autobiographical aspects of the composer's life, is a nostalgic look at a family living in post-World War II London suburbs. Arthur was followed by a series of rock operas/narrative concept albums by the Kinks including: Lola Versus Powerman and the Moneygoround, Part One (1970) about a songwriter and the music business; Everybody's in Show-Biz (1972) about a touring musician and life on the road; Preservation Act 1 (1973) and Preservation Act 2 (1974), on dystopian politics; Soap Opera (1975), and Schoolboys in Disgrace (1975).

=== 1970s ===
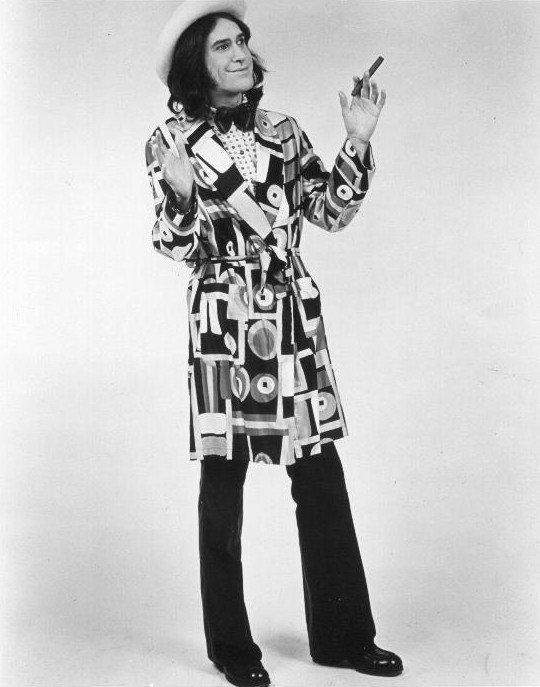
Ray Davies (ca. 1973-74) of The Kinks in character as "Mr Flash" from his rock opera Preservation

A rock opera that experienced commercial recording and Broadway success is Jesus Christ Superstar (1970), written by Andrew Lloyd Webber and Tim Rice, and in respect of which Lloyd Webber said "the piece was written as a rock album from the outset and set out from the start to tell the story through the music itself."

In 1972, David Bowie released the rock opera The Rise and Fall of Ziggy Stardust and the Spiders from Mars.

Lou Reed’s third solo album Berlin, released in October 1973, consists of 10 songs telling the story of Caroline and her tragic descent into excess, abuse, and decadence. There were originally plans for a stage adaptation of the album at the time of its release, but these never materialized. A concert film, Berlin: Live at St. Ann's Warehouse directed by Julian Schnabel, was recorded in 2006, premiered at the Venice Film Festival in 2007, followed by a general release and live album in 2008. Lou Reed's Berlin was preceded by several relatively long form, narrative songs such as The Gift and Lady Godiva's Operation from The Velvet Underground’s, White Light/White Heat album released January 1968, and The Murder Mystery from The Velvet Underground album 1969, in which original short stories by Reed were set to music by the band.

The progressive rock band Genesis released The Lamb Lies Down on Broadway in 1974, their last album to feature lead vocalist Peter Gabriel. The album tells a story devised by Gabriel, centered around a troubled youth from New York City who is taken through a series of surreal and symbolic experiences that ultimately lead to his transformation and spiritual awakening.

Bat Out of Hell (1977) is a rock album by Meat Loaf that remains one of the best-selling albums of all time, having sold over 50 million copies worldwide. It is certified 14× Platinum by the Recording Industry Association of America (RIAA). As of June 2019, it has spent 522 weeks in the UK Albums Chart, the second longest chart run by a studio album. Rolling Stone ranked it at number 343 on its list of the 500 Greatest Albums of All Time. A musical based on Bat Out of Hell, staged by Jay Scheib, opened at the Manchester Opera House in 2017. The album's producer, Jim Steinman, coined the term Wagnerian rock after composer Richard Wagner to describe the genre of the record.

The Wall, a double album released by Pink Floyd in 1979, is an archetypal example of a rock opera and among the most successful. The Wall chronicles the story of Pink, a character who ultimately constructs an emotional wall to protect himself after being driven into insanity as a result of traumatic life experiences. The album was included in Rolling Stone's lists of the greatest albums of all time in 2003, 2012, and 2020. James Guthrie, the album's engineer, won the 1980 Grammy award for Best Engineered Recording (non-classical), and the album was nominated for the Grammy Award for Album of the Year. The album was subsequently made into a 1982 film entitled Pink Floyd – The Wall. An elaborate 1980–1981 concert tour was conducted by the band after the album's release and bassist Roger Waters reincarnated the tour twice; once in Berlin in 1990 to commemorate the fall of the Berlin Wall and again around the world from 2010–2013, a series of shows that became the highest-grossing tour by a solo musician.

=== 1980s and beyond ===
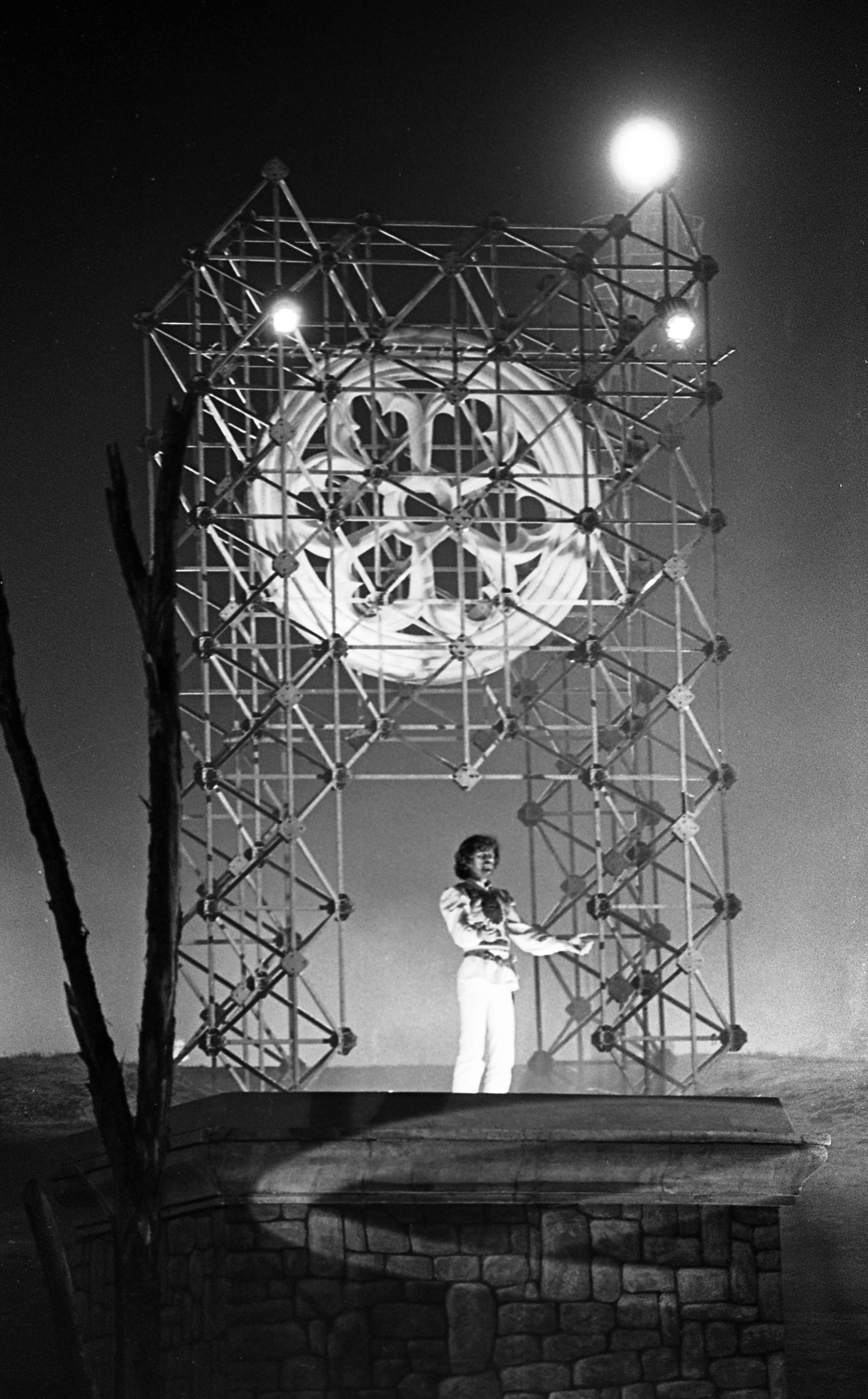
In the best-known role of his career, László Pelsőczy plays the title role of Stephen in István, a király, which he played at the King's Hill and at the Szeged Open Air Festival

A rap opera by the Fat Boys, On and On, was produced in 1989.

In 1999, progressive metal band Dream Theater released their album Metropolis Pt. 2: Scenes from a Memory, which has been regarded as Rock Opera. The album tells the story of Nicholas, a man getting flashbacks from a previous life, as he undergoes hypnosis sessions to recall the memories of Victoria, a young girl who he discovers was murdered as a violent result of a love affair.

Green Day produced a punk rock opera American Idiot in 2004, followed by 21st Century Breakdown in 2009.

In 2005 The Protomen debuted, by band the Protomen, who toured in-character performing the dystopian rock opera. Because of the science fiction elements of the plot, their music has been called "sci-fi rock". A prequel rock opera Act II: The Father of Death was released 2009 and a sequel Act III: This City Made Us in 2026. Act III debuted at number nine on the Billboard Top Album Sales chart for the end of January. For the same time period, the Protomen charted at number four on Emerging Artists.

In an effort to appeal to more modern audiences, opera companies have welcomed more pop and rock influences. The resulting rock operas have met varying degrees of success as the worlds of high art and low art mix. In Russian music, the term zong-opera (Зонг-опера) is sometimes used, since the first Soviet-Russian rock-opera Orpheus and Eurydice was described with this term, though the term "rock-opera" was already known in the Soviet rock music circles.

== Style ==
According to Fleming, rock operas are more akin to a cantata or suite, because they are not usually acted out,[or more accurately oratorios, which are typically operas that are not usually acted out]. Similarly, Andrew Clements of The Guardian called Tommy a subversively labeled musical. Clements states that lyrics drive rock operas, which makes them not a true form of opera. Responding to accusations that rock operas are pretentious and overblown, Pete Townshend wrote that pop music by its very nature rejects such characteristics and is an inherently simple form. Townshend said that the only goal of pop music is to reach audiences, and rock operas are merely one more way to do so. Peter Kiesewalter, on the other hand, said that rock music and opera are "both overblown, massive spectacles" that cover the same themes. Kiesewalter, who was originally not a fan of opera, did not think the two styles would mix well together, but his modernized operas with rock music surprised him with their popularity at the East Village Opera Company.

The performance of these works on Broadway has also courted controversy; Anne Midgette of The New York Times called them musicals with "no more than the addition of a keyboard and a drum set".

== See also ==
- Album era
- Baltimore Rock Opera Society
- List of rock musicals
- Rap opera
