= White Faced Lady =

Studio album by Kaleidoscope
- Released: 14 February 1991
- Recorded: 1971
- Genre: Psychedelic rock, progressive rock
- Length: 60:09
- Label: The Kaleidoscope Record Company

Kaleidoscope chronology
From Home to Home (as Fairfield Parlour) (1970)	White Faced Lady (1991)

Professional ratings
Review scores
Source	Rating
Allmusic	4/5 stars

White Faced Lady is an album by UK band Kaleidoscope (who by this time were calling themselves Fairfield Parlour). It is a concept album that tells the story of a pale-skinned girl named Angel, from her troubled youth to her sudden rise to fame as a movie star to her tragic decline and untimely death. Reportedly, it was inspired by the life of Marilyn Monroe, and the final track name-checks Marilyn and Arthur Miller. As a rock opera, it follows the example of The Pretty Things' S. F. Sorrow rather than The Who's Tommy, with the liner notes telling the complete story and the songs expounding on key events. Many of the songs are tied together by brief musical segues.

The band worked on the album privately from 1970 to 1971. They had a deal in place to deliver the finished album to a record label for distribution, but the deal suddenly dissolved. The album went unreleased until 1991, when it was released by the band's own The Kaleidoscope Record Company (KRC 001 CD). Many subsequent CD releases package the album with the previous Fairfield Parlour album From Home to Home.

== Track listing ==
1. "Overture" - 2:48
2. "Broken Mirrors" - 2:49
3. "Angel's Song: Dear Elvis Presley..." - 2:39
4. "Nursey, Nursey" - 3:47
5. "Small Song: Heaven in the Back Row" - 3:21
6. "Burning Bright" - 2:03
7. "The Matchseller" - 3:50
8. "The Coronation of the Fledgling" - 0:20
9. "All Hail to the Hero" - 5:03
10. "White Faced Lady" - 4:41
11. "Freefall" - 5:13
12. "Standing" - 6:12
13. "Diary Song: the Indian Head" - 0:54
14. "Song from Jon" - 6:56
15. "Long Way Down" - 4:05
16. "The Locket" - 2:58
17. "Picture with Conversation" - 3:38
18. "Epitaph: Angel" - 7:48

== Personnel ==
- Peter Daltrey: vocals and organ
- Eddy Pumer: guitar
- Steve Clark: bass
- Dan Bridgman: drums
