= All of Us (album) =

The existence of chance is everything and nothing while the greatest achievement is the living of life, and so say ALL OF US

Studio album by Nirvana
- Released: August 1968
- Recorded: 1968
- Genre: Psychedelic rock, art pop, progressive rock
- Length: 35:23
- Label: Island
- Producer: Chris Blackwell

Nirvana chronology
The Story of Simon Simopath (1967)	The existence of chance is everything and nothing while the greatest achievement is the living of life, and so say ALL OF US (1968)	To Markos III (1970)

Professional ratings
Review scores
Source	Rating
Allmusic	3/5 stars

The existence of chance is everything and nothing while the greatest achievement is the living of life, and so say ALL OF US, or simply All of Us, is the second studio album released by the British psychedelic rock band Nirvana. The album was released in August 1968.

The album includes "Rainbow Chaser", which was a number 1 single in Denmark in April 1969, where it stayed in the top 10 for a month, and was also their only UK top 40 hit, peaking at number 34.

The cover shot is a monochrome reproduction of Les Conquérants (The Conquerors) painted in 1892 by Pierre Fritel, and depicts some of world history's most famous figures leading a procession through a mass of dead bodies.

== Track listing ==
All songs written by Patrick Campbell-Lyons and Alex Spyropolous.

Side one

1. "Rainbow Chaser" – 2:38
2. "Tiny Goddess" – 4:03
3. "The Touchables (All of Us)" – 2:59
4. "Melanie Blue" – 2:40
5. "Trapeze" – 2:49
6. "The Show Must Go On" – 2:40

Side two

1. "Girl in the Park" – 2:41
2. "Miami Masquerade" – 2:48
3. "Frankie the Great" – 2:29
4. "You Can Try It" – 3:18
5. "Everybody Loves the Clown" – 2:00
6. "St. John's Wood Affair" – 4:18

The 2003 Universal Island Remasters collection features 16 tracks including four b-sides as bonus tracks:

1. "Flashbulb" (single b-side)
2. "Oh! What a Performance" (single b-side)
3. "Darling Darlene" (single b-side)
4. "C Side of Ocho Rios" (single b-side)

== Personnel ==
- Patrick Campbell-Lyons – guitar & vocals
- Ray Singer – guitar & vocals
- Alex Spyropoulos – piano & keyboards

== Production notes ==
- Brian Humphries – engineer, producer
- Gered Mankowitz – photography
