= List of Cash Box Top 100 number-one singles of 1970 =

These are the number-one singles on the Top 100 Singles chart in 1970 as published in Cashbox magazine.

Key
The yellow background indicates the #1 song on the Cash Box Year-End Charts for 1970.

| Issue date | Song | Artist |
|---|---|---|
| January 3 | "Someday We'll Be Together" | Diana Ross & The Supremes |
| January 10 | "Raindrops Keep Fallin' on My Head" | B. J. Thomas |
| January 17 | "Raindrops Keep Fallin' on My Head" | B. J. Thomas |
| January 24 | "I Want You Back" | The Jackson 5 |
| January 31 | "Venus" | Shocking Blue |
| February 7 | "Venus" | Shocking Blue |
| February 14 | "Venus" | Shocking Blue |
| February 21 | "Thank You (Falettinme Be Mice Elf Agin)" | Sly & the Family Stone |
| February 28 | "Bridge over Troubled Water" | Simon and Garfunkel |
| March 7 | "Bridge over Troubled Water" | Simon and Garfunkel |
| March 14 | "Bridge over Troubled Water" | Simon and Garfunkel |
| March 21 | "Bridge over Troubled Water" | Simon and Garfunkel |
| March 28 | "Let It Be" | The Beatles |
| April 4 | "Let It Be" | The Beatles |
| April 11 | "Let It Be" | The Beatles |
| April 18 | "Let It Be" | The Beatles |
| April 25 | "ABC" | The Jackson 5 |
| May 2 | "Spirit in the Sky" | Norman Greenbaum |
| May 9 | "Spirit in the Sky" | Norman Greenbaum |
| May 16 | "American Woman" | The Guess Who |
| May 23 | "American Woman" | The Guess Who |
| May 30 | "Cecilia" | Simon and Garfunkel |
| June 6 | "Everything Is Beautiful" | Ray Stevens |
| June 13 | "The Long and Winding Road" | The Beatles |
| June 20 | "The Long and Winding Road" | The Beatles |
| June 27 | "The Love You Save" | The Jackson 5 |
| July 4 | "The Love You Save" | The Jackson 5 |
| July 11 | "Mama Told Me (Not to Come)" | Three Dog Night |
| July 18 | "Mama Told Me (Not to Come)" | Three Dog Night |
| July 25 | "Ball of Confusion (That's What the World Is Today)" | The Temptations |
| August 1 | "(They Long to Be) Close to You" | The Carpenters |
| August 8 | "(They Long to Be) Close to You" | The Carpenters |
| August 15 | "Make It With You" | Bread |
| August 22 | "Signed, Sealed, Delivered I'm Yours" | Stevie Wonder |
| August 29 | "Spill the Wine" | Eric Burdon & War |
| September 5 | "War" | Edwin Starr |
| September 12 | "War" | Edwin Starr |
| September 19 | "Patches" | Clarence Carter |
| September 26 | "Ain't No Mountain High Enough" | Diana Ross |
| October 3 | "Lookin' out My Back Door" | Creedence Clearwater Revival |
| October 10 | "Candida" | Dawn |
| October 17 | "Cracklin' Rosie" | Neil Diamond |
| October 24 | "I'll Be There" | The Jackson 5 |
| October 31 | "I'll Be There" | The Jackson 5 |
| November 7 | "We've Only Just Begun" | The Carpenters |
| November 14 | "Indiana Wants Me" | R. Dean Taylor |
| November 21 | "I Think I Love You" | The Partridge Family |
| November 28 | "I Think I Love You" | The Partridge Family |
| December 5 | "I Think I Love You" | The Partridge Family |
| December 12 | "The Tears of a Clown" | Smokey Robinson & the Miracles |
| December 19 | "My Sweet Lord" | George Harrison |
| December 26 | "My Sweet Lord" | George Harrison |

== See also ==
- 1970 in music
- List of Hot 100 number-one singles of 1970 (U.S.)
