= I Think, Therefore I Am =

Studio album by R. Dean Taylor
- Released: December 1970
- Genre: Soft rock
- Length: 30:52
- Language: English
- Label: Rare Earth
- Producer: R. Dean Taylor

R. Dean Taylor chronology
I Think, Therefore I Am (1970)	Indiana Wants Me (1973)

I Think, Therefore I Am is the debut studio album from Canadian singer-songwriter R. Dean Taylor, released on Rare Earth Records in 1970.

== Reception ==
Billboard recommended this album to retailers, calling it an "exceptional package" and noting several standout tracks. Editors at AllMusic Guide rated this album three out of five stars, with critic Quint Kik calling Taylor Motown's "greatest enigma" and criticizes the cover versions as bland, but considers the originals stronger due to Taylor's gift for songwriting.

== Track listing ==
1. "Gotta See Jane" (Eddie Holland, Ron Miller and R. Dean Taylor) – 3:05
2. "Fire and Rain" (James Taylor) – 2:57
3. "Woman Alive" (R. Taylor) – 2:33
4. "Ain't It a Sad Thing" (R. Taylor) – 2:28
5. "Indiana Wants Me" (R. Taylor) – 3:46
6. "Back Street" (R. Taylor) – 3:35
7. "Two of Us" (John Lennon and Paul McCartney) – 3:04
8. "Sunday Morning Coming Down" (Kris Kristofferson) – 4:13
9. "Gonna Give Her All the Love I've Got" (Barrett Strong and Norman Whitfield) – 2:48
10. "Love's Your Name" (R. Taylor) – 2:20

== Personnel ==
- R. Dean Taylor – guitar, vocals, production
- Tom Bert, The Peggy-Jo Studio – photography
- Curtis McNair – art direction, design
- Scott Regen, WKNR – liner notes
- Tom Schlesinger – graphics

== Chart performance ==
This album underperformed in terms of sales. Canada's RPM certified this album peak at fiftieth on February 13, 1971 and in the United States, it reached 198 on the Billboard 200. Additionally, the single "Indiana Wants Me" was a top five hit.

== See also ==
- List of 1970 albums
