= Warner/Reprise Loss Leaders =

1970s promotional sampler albums

The Warner/Reprise Loss Leaders were a series of promotional sampler compilation albums released by Warner Bros. Records throughout the 1970s. Each album (usually a 2-record set) contained a wide variety of tracks by artists under contract to Warner Bros. and its subsidiary labels (primarily Reprise Records); often these were singles, B-sides, non-hit album tracks, or otherwise obscure material, all designed to arouse interest in the artists' regular albums. Also found on some were humorous, bizarre interstitial audio material—clips from old records and movies, short skits, found sound, etc.--and most albums featured clever, humorous cover art and liner notes. Most of the 1970s albums were compiled and annotated by Barry Hansen, better known as Dr. Demento.

== Overview ==
Warner advertised the Loss Leaders albums by magazine and by inserting special illustrated inner sleeves in all of its regular album releases, listing all of the currently available Loss Leaders and including an order form. Each Loss Leader double album was priced at US$2, significantly less than a comparable regular-release double album of the time. (There were also a few single disc issues in 1969-71, and at least one triple disc set.) The fact that Warner sold these double albums at low cost in hopes of increasing sales of their regular releases is the source of the series name Loss Leaders.

The first Loss Leaders compilation was The 1969 Warner/Reprise Songbook, featuring a wide range of artists from Miriam Makeba to the Mothers of Invention; the last of the original series was the punk and new wave-themed Troublemakers in 1980.

Loss Leaders Revisited (PRO-CD-7955, 1995), a limited-edition CD (3500 copies) and Loss Leaders 2 (PRO-CD-9949, 1999) a limited-edition CD (2500 copies), were not properly Loss Leader releases, since they were given away. There have been no further Loss Leaders releases.

== List ==
- The 1969 Warner/Reprise Songbook
- The 1969 Warner/Reprise Record Show
- October 10, 1969
- The Big Ball
- Schlagers!
- Zappéd
- Looney Tunes & Merrie Melodies (3 LP)
- Non-Dairy Creamer
- Hot Platters
- Together
- The Whole Burbank Catalog
- Middle of the Road
- Burbank
- The Days of Wine and Vinyl
- Appetizers
- All Singing - All Talking - All Rocking
- Hard Goods
- Peaches
- Deep Ear
- The Force
- All Meat
- Peaches, Vol. 2
- I Didn't Know They Still Made Records Like This
- The Works
- Supergroup
- The People's Record
- Cook Book
- Limo
- Collectus Interruptus
- Pumping Vinyl
- A La Carte
- Monsters
- Eclipse
- Music with 58 Musicians, Volume 1
- Troublemakers
- Loss Leaders Revisited
- Loss Leaders 2

== See also ==
- Sampler (record)
