= Indiana Wants Me =

Single by R. Dean Taylor

from the album I Think, Therefore I Am
- B-side: "Love's Your Name"
- Released: August 1970
- Recorded: 1970
- Length: 3:01, 3:37
- Label: Rare Earth Records; 5013
- Songwriter: R. Dean Taylor
- Producer: R. Dean Taylor

R. Dean Taylor singles chronology
"Gotta See Jane" (1967)	"Indiana Wants Me" (1970)	"Ain't It A Sad Thing" (1971)

45 RPM red vinyl
- Limited edition release

"Indiana Wants Me" is a song written, composed, and originally recorded by Canadian singer-songwriter R. Dean Taylor. It was released on the Rare Earth label, a subsidiary of Motown Records, in 1970, and was a top ten hit in both the US and UK. In Cashbox magazine, the single hit #1. The song spent two weeks at #2 in Canada.

The song is written from the viewpoint of someone who has killed a man out of defending his wife's honor; he is missing his family and hiding from the police, who eventually catch up with him. Taylor wrote and composed the song after watching the movie Bonnie and Clyde. In addition to writing, composing, and originally recording the selection, Taylor produced the record and arranged it in collaboration with David Van De Pitte. It was released on the Rare Earth label, formed by Motown in an attempt to establish itself in the rock music market. The police siren sounds at the start of the record were removed from some copies supplied to radio stations after complaints that drivers hearing the song on the radio had mistakenly pulled over, thinking that the sounds were real.

The sirens are also heard during the instrumental section in the middle of the song. At the climax of the song, soon after the narrator has sung, "Red lights are flashin' around me,/ Yeah, love, it looks like they found me," and the chorus, a voice on a bullhorn is heard, commanding: "This is the police. Give yourself up. You are surrounded." The sound of gunfire ensues, implying the narrator declines to surrender and instead perishes in a shootout with the police. An alternate version of the song fades out at the end without the gunfire.

The record became Taylor's only hit as a performer in the US, where it rose to #5 on the Billboard Hot 100 and to #1 on the Cash Box Top 100 in late 1970. Taylor appeared on the TV show American Bandstand to promote the record. In the UK, where Taylor had had an earlier hit with "Gotta See Jane", it also became his biggest hit, reaching #2 in May 1971.

== Charts ==
=== Weekly singles charts ===
Chart (1970–71)	Peak position
Australia (Kent Music Report)	30
Canada RPM Top Singles	2
Canada RPM Adult Contemporary	6
Ireland (IRMA)	2
New Zealand (Listener)	11
South Africa (Springbok Radio)	3
UK	2
US Billboard Hot 100	5
US Cash Box Top 100	1

=== Year-end charts ===
Chart (1970)	Rank
Canada	28
US Billboard Hot 100	54
US Cashbox Top 100	53

== See also ==
- List of Cashbox Top 100 number-one singles of 1970
