= Kaleidoscope (British band) =

English psychedelic rock band

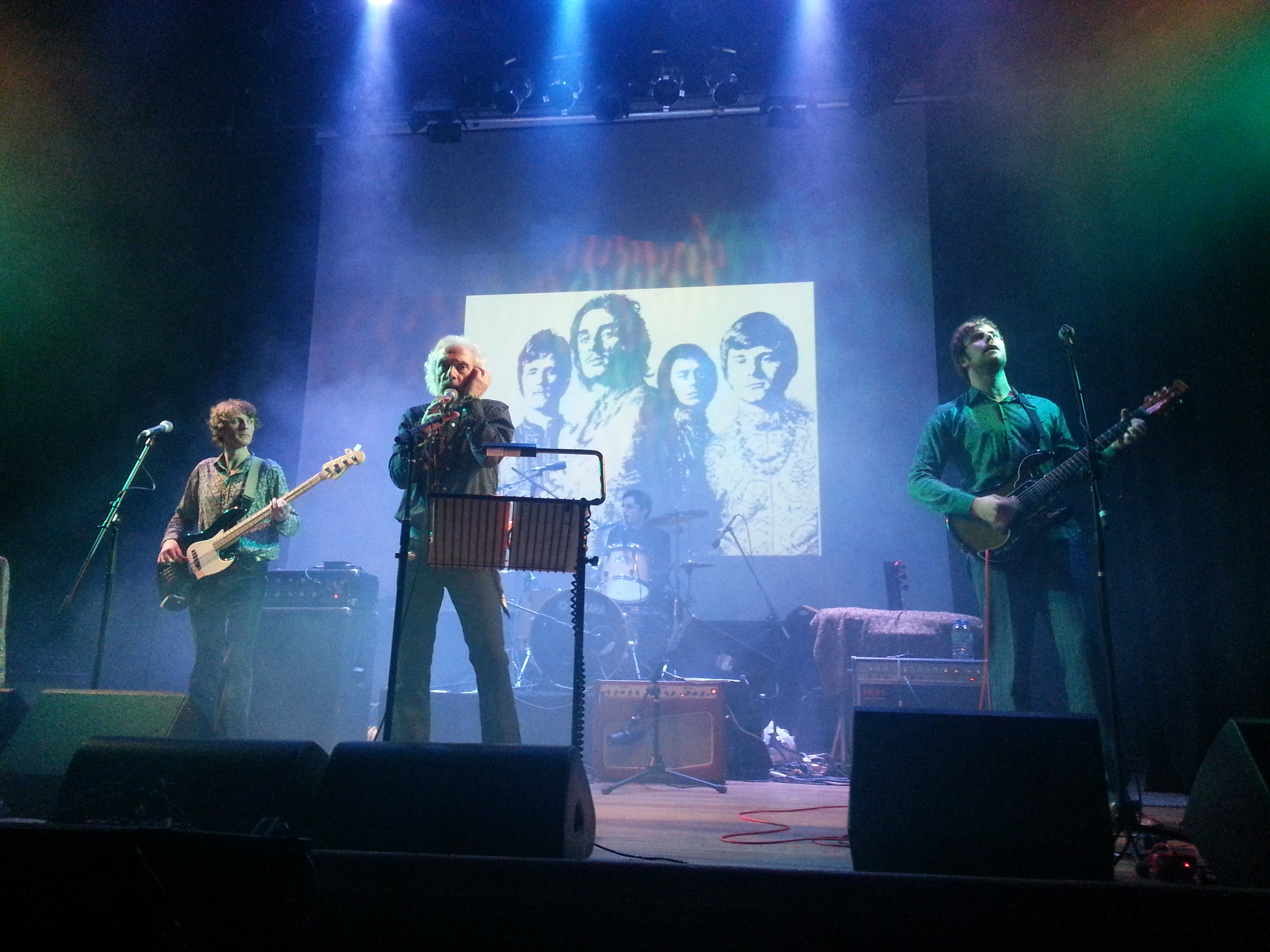
- Kaleidoscope at Islington Assembly Halls; 17 November 2013. Centre: Peter Daltrey.

Background information
- Also known as: Fairfield Parlour, I Luv Wight
- Origin: London, England
- Genres: Psychedelic rock; psychedelic pop; art rock
- Years active: 1967–1970; 2013–present
- Labels: Fontana, Vertigo
- Members: Eddy Pumer; Steve Clark; Danny Bridgman; Peter Daltrey
- Website: Kaleidoscope/Fairfield Parlour

Kaleidoscope are an English psychedelic rock band from London that originally were active between 1967 and 1970. The band's songs combined the elements of psychedelia with whimsical lyrics. The band were earlier known as The Sidekicks and The Key, and from 1970 as Fairfield Parlour and briefly as I Luv Wight.

== Kaleidoscope ==
Having performed since 1963 under the name The Sidekicks, they became The Key in November 1965, before settling upon the name Kaleidoscope when they signed a deal with Fontana Records in January 1967 with the help of the music publisher Dick Leahy. The group consisted of Eddy Pumer on guitar, Steve Clark on bass and flute, and Danny Bridgman on drums and the vocalist Peter Daltrey, who also played various keyboard instruments. Most of the band's songs were compositions of Pumer's music and Daltrey's lyrics. While the group did not achieve major commercial success in its time, it retains a loyal fan base and its recordings are still held in high regard.

The band's first single "Flight from Ashiya" (b/w "Holidaymaker") was released on 15 September 1967 by Fontana Records, before the band's first album Tangerine Dream. The single, with lyrics about an impending plane crash, got critical acclaim and radio airplay but failed to reach the charts. The song has subsequently appeared on many compilation albums, including Nuggets II: Original Artyfacts from the British Empire and Beyond, 1964–1969, the second box set of the Nuggets series, and Acid Drops, Spacedust & Flying Saucers: Psychedelic Confectionery.

Two months later, Tangerine Dream, also produced by Dick Leahy, was released. The album included "Flight From Ashiya", "Please Excuse My Face" and "Dive into Yesterday," now considered some of the band's best songs. Meanwhile, the band performed live on several BBC Radio shows. A new single was released in 1968 called "Jenny Artichoke" (b/w "Just How Much You Are"), inspired by Donovan's, "Jennifer Juniper". After the release the band traveled around Europe, supporting Country Joe and the Fish at the Amsterdam Concert Hall while in Netherlands. Faintly Blowing, also produced by Leahy, was released in 1969 by Fontana Records. This time the band's sound was heavier, but the tracks still included psychedelic elements with striking lyrics but it failed to reach the charts. After the failure of Faintly Blowing, they released two more singles.

== Fairfield Parlour ==
By the end of the decade, failing with their last single "Balloon", the band moved on with their new manager, DJ David Symonds, whom they met during the BBC sessions, under the name Fairfield Parlour, with the same lineup. Although now called a progressive rock band, their music did not change much, still including fairy-tale lyrics with psychedelic harmony. The band's first single as Fairfield Parlour, "Bordeaux Rosé", was released on 17 April 1970 on the Vertigo label. It got a considerable amount of radio airplay, but failed to chart. After releasing several singles, the album From Home to Home was released on 14 August 1970 with Symonds' production. While the band was getting ready to release the album, they again used another name for themselves, I Luv Wight, as they were asked to record the theme song for the Isle of Wight Festival, "Let the World Wash in", which was released a week after the album From Home to Home. They made the opening for the festival as Fairfield Parlour.

The band's fourth album, White Faced Lady, which they financed independently, was recorded in Morgan Studios in London. Attempts at finding a record company failed and the album was shelved until 1991 when it was released under the name Kaleidoscope on an independent label. The band's last appearance in the early days was at a concert in Bremen, Germany, in 1972.

In 2003, the Kaleidoscope and Fairfield Parlour's BBC radio sessions, recorded between 1967 and 1971, were released as Please Listen to the Pictures on the independent label Circle.

== Band members ==
- Eddy Pumer – lead guitar and organ (born Kenneth Edmund Pumer, 7 October 1947, Woolwich, South East London, died 21 September 2020)
- Steve Clark – bass and flute (born 1946, died 1 May 1999 Chelsea Bridge, South West London)
- Danny Bridgman – drums (born Daniel Bridgman in 1947)
- Peter Daltrey – lead vocals and organ (born Peter James Daltrey, 25 March 1946, Bow, East London)

== Discography ==
=== Singles ===
as Kaleidoscope

- "Flight from Ashiya" / "Holidaymaker" (Fontana TF 863, 15 September 1967)
- "A Dream for Julie" / "Please Excuse My Face" (Fontana TF 895, 26 January 1968)
- "Jenny Artichoke" / "Just How Much You Are" (Fontana TF 964, 6 September 1968)
- "Flight from Ashiya" / "(Further Reflections) In the Room of Percussion" (Fontana 267 906 TF, 1968, Netherlands only)
- "Do It Again for Jeffrey" / "Poem" (Fontana TF 1002, 14 March 1969)
- "Balloon" / "If You So Wish" (Fontana TF 1048, 25 July 1969)
- "Nursey, Nursey" (free with Bucketfull of Brains magazine) (BOB.23, 1 May 1989)

as Fairfield Parlour

- "Bordeaux Rose" / "Chalk on the Wall" (Vertigo 6059 003, 17 April 1970)
- "Emily" / "Sunnyside Circus" (Vertigo 6059 032, 1970, Australia only)
- "In My Box" / "Glorious House Of Arthur" (Vertigo 6059 017, 1970, France promo-only)
- "Just Another Day" / "Caraminda" / "I Am All the Animals" / "Song for You" (Vertigo 6059 008, 24 July 1970)
- "Eyewitness" / "Epilog" (Odeon OR-2903, 1970, Japan-only)
- "Bordeaux Rose" / "Baby Stay for Tonight" (Prism PRI 1, 19 March 1976)
- "Bordeaux Rose" / "Overture to White Faced Lady" (Decca Y-11212, 1976, Australia only)

as I Luv Wight

- "Let the World Wash In" / "Medieval Masquerade" (Philips 6006 043, 21 August 1970)

=== Albums ===
as The Sidekicks

- The Sidekicks Sessions 1964-1967 (2003)

as Kaleidoscope

- Tangerine Dream (Fontana (S)TL 5448, 24 November 1967)
- Faintly Blowing (Fontana STL5491, 11 April 1969)
- White Faced Lady (The Kaleidoscope Record Company KRC 001 CD, 14 February 1991)
- Please Listen to the Pictures (Circle Records CPWL/CPWC 104, 1 September 2003)

as Fairfield Parlour

- From Home to Home (Vertigo, 14 August 1970)
