= Gotta See Jane =

Single by R. Dean Taylor

from the album I Think, Therefore I Am
- B-side: "Don't Fool Around"
- Released: 1968
- Recorded: 1967
- Genre: R & B
- Label: Tamla Motown TMG656 & TMG918
- Songwriters: R. Dean Taylor, Eddie Holland, Ronald Miller
- Producer: R. Dean Taylor

R. Dean Taylor singles chronology
"Poor Girl" (1965)	"Gotta See Jane" (1968)	"Indiana Wants Me" (1970)

"Gotta See Jane" is a song by Canadian singer-songwriter R. Dean Taylor that was co-written by Taylor with Eddie Holland (of Holland-Dozier-Holland) and Motown songwriter Ronald Miller.

Released in 1968, it entered the UK chart in June and reached number 17 in August, staying on the chart for 12 weeks. The song appeared on Taylor's 1970 album I Think, Therefore I Am. In Canada, it reached number 12 on May 1, 1971. It was re-released in 1974, reaching number 41 in October, and again in 2004 as a b-side to a limited edition single with There's a Ghost in My House as the A-side.

== Chart performance ==
Chart (1968)	Peak position
UK Singles (The Official Charts Company)	17

Chart (1971)	Peak position
US Billboard Hot 100	67
