= Daltrey (surname) =

Daltrey is a surname. Notable people with the surname include:

- Peter Daltrey (born 1946), English singer, songwriter, and musician
- Roger Daltrey (born 1944), English singer, musician, actor, and film producer
