= R. Dean Taylor =

Canadian singer-songwriter and record producer (1939–2022)

Background information
- Born: Richard Dean Taylor; May 11, 1939; Toronto, Ontario, Canada
- Died: January 7, 2022 (aged 82) Los Angeles, California, U.S.
- Genres: Pop; rockabilly; soul
- Occupations: Singer-songwriter, record producer, musician
- Instruments: Vocals; guitar
- Years active: 1961–1980s
- Label: Rare Earth/Motown Records
- Website: http://www.rdeantaylor.com

Richard Dean Taylor (May 11, 1939 – January 7, 2022) was a Canadian musician, most notable as a singer, songwriter, and record producer for Motown during the 1960s and 1970s. According to Jason Ankeny, Taylor was "one of the most underrated acts ever to record under the Motown aegis."

As a singer, Taylor was best known in the U.S. for his chart-topping 1970 hit "Indiana Wants Me", which hit No. 1 in Cashbox and also reached No. 2 in Canada and No. 2 in the United Kingdom. It peaked at No. 5 on the Billboard Hot 100. Taylor became well known in the UK for other hits, including "Gotta See Jane" and "There's a Ghost in My House".

== Life and career ==
Taylor was born in Toronto, Ontario, on May 11, 1939. He began his career in 1961, as a pianist and singer with several country music bands in Toronto. Taylor also made his first recordings in 1961, for the Audiomaster record label. The next year, Taylor's "At the High School Dance", a single for Amy-Mala Records, was a minor success. His next single, "I'll Remember", on the Barry label, was a No. 23 success for Toronto rock and roll radio station CHUM, and the singer decided to relocate to Detroit, Michigan, to further his career.

In Detroit, Taylor auditioned for, and was hired by, Motown in 1964 as a songwriter and recording artist for the subsidiary V.I.P. label. Taylor's scheduled first single (March 1964) for V.I.P. was the topical satire "My Ladybug (Stay Away From That Beatle)", but it was deemed too weak for release and was never issued.

It was not until November 1965 that Taylor's debut V.I.P. single, "Let's Go Somewhere", was issued. It was written by Taylor in conjunction with Brian Holland, and produced by the team of Holland and Lamont Dozier, who had already produced five No. 1 scoring songs for the Supremes. However, the song was only a regional success in several U.S. cities and Toronto.

Taylor's next single (1967's "There's a Ghost in My House") was written by the team of Holland–Dozier–Holland along with Taylor, and again produced by Brian Holland and Lamont Dozier. It was also a commercial disappointment in the US – but it was a No. 3 hit in the UK singles chart in 1974. Taylor was also beginning to become a songwriter for other acts, as "I'll Turn to Stone" by the Four Tops, and "All I Need" by The Temptations were both charting US singles in 1967, co-composed by him. In 1968, Taylor's self-produced single "Gotta See Jane", co-written with Brian Holland, became a Top 20 hit in the UK.

After Holland, Dozier and Eddie Holland left Motown, more success for Taylor came as a member of the Motown writing and production team known as "the Clan", together with Frank Wilson, Pam Sawyer and Deke Richards. This production group was briefly the prime creator of material for Diana Ross & the Supremes after the Holland-Dozier-Holland team left Motown. Among Taylor's successful co-compositions and co-productions during 1968 and 1969 as a member of The Clan were Diana Ross & the Supremes' No. 1 US hit "Love Child" and their Top 10 follow-up hit "I'm Livin' in Shame".

Taylor resumed his recording career in 1970, becoming one of the first artists assigned to Motown's new subsidiary Rare Earth, which was dedicated to white artists. In that year, his first Rare Earth single, "Indiana Wants Me", became a No. 2 hit in his native Canada and No. 1 in Cashbox magazine in the US, the first Motown record by a white performer to reach that position. The song peaked at No. 5 on the Billboard Hot 100 chart, and at No. 2 in the UK.

"Gotta See Jane" was also reissued in 1971, and became a success in Canada at number 12. His 1972 single "Taos New Mexico" did not do well on the Canadian charts, reaching number 48. He continued recording for Rare Earth, and working as a writer-producer for other artists until Rare Earth was ended in 1976. Though he never again scored the charts as he had done with "Indiana Wants Me", his releases did moderately well, especially in Canada. As a Canadian citizen, he could be played on CKLW and other Canadian radio stations and counted towards the stations' Canadian content quotas.

Taylor attempted a comeback during the early 1980s, after which he had a hiatus from the music industry. He also established his own record company, Jane Records, in 1973. He built a recording studio at his home in Los Angeles, and worked on an unpublished memoir of his time at Motown.

Taylor died at home on January 7, 2022, at the age of 82. He had been ill since contracting COVID-19 the previous year. At the time of his death he had been married for 52 years to his wife Janee.

== Discography ==
=== Albums ===
- 1970: I Think, Therefore I Am (Rare Earth Records) – CAN No. 50, US No. 198
- 1973: Indiana Wants Me (Sounds Superb) (UK-only compilation)
- 1975: LA Sunset (Polydor)
- 2001: The Essential Collection (Spectrum)

=== Singles ===
Title	Year	Peak chart positions											
Title	Year	CAN	CAN (AC)	AUS	GER	IRE	NL	NZ	SA	UK	US	US AC	US Country
"At the High School Dance" (as R. Dean Taylor & His Combo)	1960	—	—	—	—	—	—	—	—	—	—	—	—
"I'll Remember"	1962	23	—	—	—	—	—	—	—	—	—	—	—
"We Fell in Love as We Tangoed"	1962	—	—	—	—	—	—	—	—	—	—	—	—
"Let's Go Somewhere"	1965	39	—	—	—	—	—	—	—	—	—	—	—
"There's a Ghost in My House"	1967	—	—	—	—	—	—	—	—	—	—	—	—
"Gotta See Jane"	1968	—	—	—	—	—	32	—	—	17	—	—	—
"Indiana Wants Me"	1970	2	6	30	—	2	—	11	3	2	5	—	—
"Ain't It a Sad Thing"	1971	35	23	—	—	—	—	—	—	—	66	—	—
"Gotta See Jane" (re-recording)	1971	12	—	89	—	—	—	—	—	—	67	—	—
"Two of Us" (New Zealand-only release)	1971	—	—	—	—	—	—	—	—	—	—	—	—
"Candy Apple Red"	1971	69	—	—	—	—	—	—	—	—	104	—	—
"Taos New Mexico" / "Shadow"	1972	48; 75	— 43	98	—	—	22	—	—	—	83	28	—
"Sweet Flowers"	1973	—	—	—	—	—	—	—	—	—	—	—	—
"Indiana Wants Me" (US-only re-release)	1973	—	—	—	—	—	—	—	—	—	—	—	—
"Who Will Wipe My Tears Away"	1974	—	—	—	—	—	—	—	—	—	—	—	—
"There's a Ghost in My House" (re-release)	1974	—	—	—	—	—	29	—	—	3	—	—	—
"Don't Fool Around" (UK and Netherlands-only release)	1974	—	—	—	—	—	—	—	—	—	—	—	—
"Window Shopping" (UK and Europe-only release)	1974	—	—	—	35	—	—	—	—	36	—	—	—
"Gotta See Jane" (UK and Ireland-only re-release)	1974	—	—	—	—	—	—	—	—	41	—	—	—
"Walkin' in the Sun"	1975	—	—	—	—	—	—	—	—	—	—	—	—
"Let's Talk It Over"	1975	—	—	—	—	—	—	—	—	—	—	—	90
"We'll Show Them All"	1976	77	—	—	—	—	—	—	—	—	—	—	—
"Bonnie"	1976	—	—	—	—	—	—	—	—	—	—	—	—
"Closer My Love"	1976	—	—	—	—	—	—	—	—	—	—	—	—
"I'll Name the Baby After You"	1979	—	—	—	—	—	—	—	—	—	—	—	—
"Let's Talk It Over" (new version)	1981	—	—	—	—	—	—	—	—	—	—	—	—
"Out in the Alley" (US-only release)	1982	—	—	—	—	—	—	—	—	—	—	—	—
"There's a Ghost in My House" (UK-only limited re-release)	2004	—	—	—	—	—	—	—	—	—	—	—	—
"—" denotes releases that did not chart or were not released in that territory.

== Songwriting credits ==
- "A Little Bit for Sandy" – Paul Petersen
- "Ain't It a Sad Thing" – Taylor
- "All I Need" – The Temptations
- "At The High School Dance" – Taylor
- "Baster Baby Blues" – The Kinsey Sicks
- "Dance Hall Rock" – Barrington Levy
- "Don't Fool Around" – Taylor
- "Go on and Cry" – The Mynah Birds, Bloodstone
- "Gotta See Jane" – Taylor, The Fall, Golden Earring
- "I Don't Want to Own You (I Just Want to Love You)" – The Supremes
- "I Know Better" – Gladys Knight & the Pips, Barbara McNair, The Marvelettes
- "I'll Turn to Stone" – Four Tops, Jackie DeShannon
- "I'm Livin' in Shame" – Diana Ross & The Supremes
- "Indiana Wants Me" – Taylor, Joe Simon
- "It Must Be Love Baby" – Chris Clark
- "It's My Time" – The Mynah Birds
- "Just Look What You've Done" – Brenda Holloway
- "Let's Go Somewhere" – Taylor, David Garrick
- "Love Child" – Diana Ross & The Supremes, La Toya Jackson, Sweet Sensation
- "Love's Your Name" – Taylor
- "Mother You, Smother You" – Diana Ross & The Supremes
- "Offering" – Fred Wesley
- "Shadow" – Taylor, Tindersticks
- "So Long" – Marvin Gaye
- "The Beginning of the End of Love" – Diana Ross & The Supremes
- "There's A Ghost in My House" – Taylor, The Fall, Graham Parker, The Fog Band, Yachts
- "Turn To Stone" – Rick Danko
- "Window Shopping" – Taylor

== See also ==
- List of Motown artists
- List of Cashbox Top 100 number-one singles of 1970
- List of 1970s one-hit wonders in the United States
