= The Story of Simon Simopath =

Studio album by Nirvana
- Released: October 1967
- Recorded: Early 1967
- Studio: Pye, London
- Genre: Rock; psychedelic pop; baroque pop
- Length: 25:28
- Label: Island
- Producer: Chris Blackwell

Nirvana chronology
The Story of Simon Simopath (1967)	All of Us (1968)

The Story of Simon Simopath is the debut album by British psychedelic band Nirvana, released by Island Records in 1967. Described by Melody Maker's Chris Welch as a "science fiction pantomime album", the songs are linked with a story on the back cover which details the dream of Simon Simopath to fly. In constructing a narrative storyline to connect the songs, The Story of Simon Simopath can be considered the very first full-length rock opera, predating both The Pretty Things' December 1968 entry S.F. Sorrow and The Who's May 1969 release Tommy by over a year. "Pentecost Hotel" was released as a single with the non-album b-side, "Feelin' Shattered". "Wings of Love" was the next single, also with a non-album b-side, "Requiem to John Coltrane". "Girl in the Park", from the second album, All of Us, featured the b-side, "C Side In Ocho Rios", which is an instrumental version of "In the Courtyard of the Stars".

== Story ==
Back cover with story linking the songs (click through to image page and enlarge to read the text)

On the back cover is a text story, "The Story of Simon Simopath: A Science Fiction Pantomime", which links the song titles. It deals with a boy named Simon Simopath who dreams of having wings. He is lonely, and after reaching adulthood goes to work in a "computer office block". He suffers a nervous breakdown and is unable to find help in a mental institution, but gets aboard a rocket and meets a centaur who will be his friend and a tiny goddess named Magdalena, who works at Pentecost Hotel. Simon and Magdalena fall in love and get married, followed by a jazzy party.

The title of the album is a possible reference to William Burroughs' novel Naked Lunch, which coins the word simopath to describe several escapees from a mental institution. In this context, the word refers to 'a citizen convinced he is an ape or other citizen'.

== Legacy ==
In a retrospective review on AllMusic, Stewart Mason feels that the "unashamedly twee early concept album", with its "deliberately childlike tone", despite being "a collection of unconnected songs forced together" in a "rather silly story", is a "uniformly solid set of well-constructed psych-pop tunes".

The Story of Simon Simopath was selected for The MOJO Collection as one of the most significant albums in musical history.

== Track listing ==
- All songs written by Patrick Campbell-Lyons and Alex Spyropoulos

Side one

1. "Wings of Love" – 3:20
2. "Lonely Boy" – 2:31
3. "We Can Help You" – 1:57
4. "Satellite Jockey" – 2:35
5. "In the Courtyard of the Stars" – 2:36

Side two

1. "You Are Just the One" – 2:07
2. "Pentecost Hotel" – 3:06
3. "I Never Found a Love Like This" – 2:50
4. "Take This Hand" – 2:17
5. "1999" – 2:09

The 2003 Universal Island Remasters collection includes both stereo and mono versions of the album on one disc. This release contains several bonus tracks:

- 11. "I Believe in Magic" (b-side to "Tiny Goddess")
- 12. "Life Ain't Easy" (previously unreleased version)
- 13. "Feelin' Shattered" (b-side to "Pentecost Hotel")
- 14. "Requiem to John Coltrane" (b-side to "Wings of Love")

All songs composed by Patrick Campbell-Lyons and Alex Spyropoulos

== Personnel ==
- Patrick Campbell-Lyons – guitar and vocals
- Alex Spyropoulos – piano, keyboards and vocals
- Clem Cattini - drums
- Barry Morgan - drums
- Herbie Flowers - bass
- Alan Parker - guitar
- Frank Ricotti - percussion
- Alan Hawkshaw - organ

Production

- Chris Blackwell – executive producer
- Brian Humphries – engineer
- Syd Dale – conductor
