= From Home to Home =

Studio album by Fairfield Parlour
- Released: August 1970
- Recorded: Morgan Studios, London
- Genre: Progressive rock, psychedelic rock, psychedelic folk, folk rock
- Length: 35:17
- Label: Vertigo
- Producer: David Symonds

Fairfield Parlour chronology
From Home to Home (1970)	White Faced Lady (as Kaleidoscope) (1991)

Singles from From Home to Home
- 1. "Bordeaux Rose / Chalk on the Wall" Released: 17 April 1970; 2. "Emily / Sunnyside Circus" Released: 1970 (Australia only); 3. "In My Box / Glorious House of Arthur" Released: 1970 (France promo-only); 4. "Bordeaux Rose / Baby Stay for Tonight" Released: 19 March 1976; 5. "Bordeaux Rose / Overture to White Faced Lady" Released: 1976 (Australia only)

Professional ratings
Review scores
Source	Rating
Allmusic	3/5 stars

From Home to Home is a 1970 album by the English prog-rock group Fairfield Parlour. In 2000 was re-released as double longplay album by "Burning Airlines" and marketed in 2001 by "Get Back" only in Italy.

== Track listing ==
All tracks are written by Peter Daltrey and Eddy Pumer.

Side one
No.	Title	Length
1.	"Aries"	3:21
2.	"In My Box"	2:02
3.	"By Your Bedside"	2:36
4.	"Soldier of the Flesh"	3:39
5.	"I Will Always Feel the Same"	1:48
6.	"Free"	4:19

Side two
No.	Title	Length
7.	"Emily"	5:17
8.	"Chalk on the Wall"	1:06
9.	"The Glorious House of Arthur"	2:47
10.	"Monkey"	2:21
11.	"Sunny Side Circus"	2:44
12.	"Drummer Boy of Shiloh"	3:17

Side three (2001 re-release bonus tracks)
No.	Title	Length
13.	"Bordeaux Rose" (Original Version)	2:40
14.	"Just Another Day"	2:35
15.	"Song for You"	1:20
16.	"Caraminda"	2:02
17.	"I Am All the Animals"	1:04

Side four (2001 re-release bonus tracks)
No.	Title	Length
18.	"Mediaeval Masquerade" (As I Luv Wight)	4:41
19.	"Eye Witness"	4:45
20.	"Let the World Wash In" (As I Luv Wight)	3:02
21.	"Baby Stay for Tonight"	3:06
22.	"Bordeaux Rose" (Alternate Version)	4:24

== Bonus tracks by Repertoire (CD) ==
No.	Title	Length
1.	"Bordeaux Rose"	2:40
2.	"Chalk of the Wall" (Mono Single Version)	1:06
3.	"Just Another Day"	2:35
4.	"Caraminda"	2:02
5.	"I Am All the Animals"	1:04
6.	"Song for You"	1:20
7.	"Bordeaux Rose" (Alternate Version)	4:24
8.	"Baby Stay for Tonight"	3:06

== Personnel ==
- Peter Daltrey: vocals and organ
- Eddy Pumer: guitar
- Steve Clark: bass
- Dan Bridgman: drums
- Unknown female vocalist on the original single, Bordeaux Rosé, released on 17th. April 1970, before the album From Home to Home (August 1970).

== See also ==
- Kaleidoscope
- Peter Daltrey
