= Clouds (1960s rock band) =

1960s Scottish rock band

- Clouds: From left to right – Harry Hughes, Ian Ellis and Billy Ritchie

Background information
- Also known as: 1-2-3
- Origin: Edinburgh, Central Scotland
- Genres: Progressive rock, Psychedelic rock, Psychedelic pop
- Years active: 1966–1971
- Labels: Island, Deram, Chrysalis, BGO, Sunrise
- Past members: Ian Ellis; Harry Hughes; Billy Ritchie
- Website: http://www.cloudsmusic.com/

Clouds were a 1960s Scottish rock band that disbanded in October 1971. The band consisted of Ian Ellis (bass and lead vocals), Harry Hughes (drums) and Billy Ritchie (keyboards).

== Biography ==
=== Early days: The Premiers ===
In early 1964, Ian Ellis and Harry Hughes were playing in a band called The Premiers. The band itself consisted of Bill Lawrence (bass guitar), James 'Shammy' Lafferty (rhythm guitar), Derek Stark (lead guitar), Harry Hughes (drums) (born 5 August 1944) and Ian Ellis (vocals) (born Ian John Ellis, 7 October 1943). It was decided that an organ would help the sound of the band, and Billy Ritchie (born 20 April 1944) joined.

Cyril Stapleton took the band to London to record some demos, but nothing came of that, and Derek Stark, Bill Lawrence, and James Lafferty decided to leave. It seemed that Ritchie joining the band had prompted more changes than had been intended. Ian Ellis decided that he would take up the position of bass guitarist as well as lead vocalist. The group decided to move in a new musical direction, and changed their name from The Premiers to 1-2-3.

=== 1-2-3 ===
1-2-3 had a very different sound from the previous band, or from almost any other band at that time. After achieving little success in Scotland, the band moved to London, England where they hoped that their original music would catch on, but early audiences were confused by the lack of a guitarist.

The band were given a headlining residency performing at the Marquee Club, attended by future prog-rock icons such as Rick Wakeman and Keith Emerson. That an unknown band was chosen to headline at the Marquee was unusual, as they hadn't first performed the customary support spots. At the time, they were described as "a unique group...who have created an entirely new sound in pop group music". The same publication referred to "the truly exciting nature of 1-2-3". Tamla Motown was the order of the day, but this band offered up a potent mix of blues, classics, pop, and scat-jazz, wrapped in arrangements that defied categorisation. Their set consisted of original songs and standards, but these latter pieces were studiously reshaped to become, in essence, new. It anticipated the techniques later used by America's Vanilla Fudge, but where the US group slowed their creations down for melodramatic emphasis, 1-2-3 were more concerned with swing, and used the pieces as stepping stones to self-expression, rather than a means in themselves. Yet they balanced this esoteric desire with a conspicuous focus on melody. There was nothing remotely like it around.

During the time the group performed at the club during 1967, they were signed by NEMS management company and Brian Epstein of The Beatles fame. This event was heralded in the national press, complete with photograph and accompanying article.

Among the Marquee audience was future superstar David Bowie, who said, when interviewed by Record Mirror in 1967, that they were "three thistle and haggis voiced bairns [who] had the audacity to face a mob of self-opinionated hippies with a brand of unique pop music which, because of its intolerance of mediocrity, floated, as would a Hogarth cartoon in Beano". It was around this time Ritchie introduced the then-unknown Bowie to Jimi Hendrix. Later, in 1994, speaking about the 1-2-3 treatment of his own song ("I Dig Everything"), Bowie said that "the song was radically altered, yet retained its heart and soul". He said he regarded Billy Ritchie as "a genius". Pete Townshend, in his 2012 autobiography Who I Am, cites 1-2-3 as one of the bands he most wants to see.

The death of Brian Epstein, founder of NEMS, left the band in the care of Robert Stigwood, his successor. But Stigwood had just signed The Bee Gees, fellow Australians, and was preoccupied with making them a success. This brought an end to the management relationship shortly afterwards. After parting company with NEMS, the band kept busy playing in the local London club circuit. At a club in Ilford, east London, the band were seen by Terry Ellis who quickly signed them to his new agency, and renamed the band Clouds.

=== Clouds ===
Originally known as the Ellis-Wright agency, the organisation grew and became Chrysalis. Clouds had also risen in prominence, playing many major tours, and appearing at the Royal Albert Hall and many of the headlining concert venues in the world, including the Fillmore East in New York. The band released a number of albums during this period. The recordings were generally very well received by the critics, with respectable sales. Concert reviews were also favourable. A Billboard magazine review of a 1970 concert at the Arragon ballroom, Chicago, began by saying 'This band will be a giant.'

But despite some initial success for the band, Chrysalis increasingly focused its attention on Jethro Tull, and the momentum that began with 1-2-3 was lost. Though the later incarnation, Clouds, was still interesting, invention was now part of the mainstream, and the group disbanded in October 1971, unable to find a niche in an overcrowded progressive rock scene. As years passed, however, it was the band's earlier incarnation as 1-2-3 that became the subject of a critical reappraisal. Ritchie, the organist, was credited as being the first of his kind, standing and taking a lead role, paving the way for others, such as Keith Emerson and Rick Wakeman. With accolades from the likes of David Bowie and others, the band's distinctive guitar-less, organ-driven sound is now viewed as a definitive precursor to the progressive rock movement.

== Discography ==
Date of release	Title	Record label
1969	Make No Bones About It b/w Heritage (single)	Island WIP6055
1969	You Can All Join In (compilation)	Island IWPS2
1969	The Clouds Scrapbook (album)	Island ILPS9100
1969	Scrapbook b/w Carpenter (single)	Island WIP6067
1969	Scrapbook b/w Old Man (single)	Island (European continent only)
1969	The Best of Island (compilation)	Island 88418Y (Netherlands only)
1969	London Pop News (compilation)	Island 88514UFY (Germany only)
1969	Bumpers (compilation)	Island IDP1
1970	Up Above Our Heads (album)	Deram Records DES18044 (USA/Canada only)
1970	Take Me To Your Leader b/w Old Man (single)	Island 6014017 (European continent only)
1971	Watercolour Days (album)	Island/Chrysalis ILPS9151, Deram 18058
1992	Nice Enough to Join In (CD reissue)	Island IMCD150
1996	Scrapbook/Watercolour Days (reissue)	BGO/EMI BGOCD317
1999	Coda	Sunrise Records (private collection)
2002	The Birth of Prog (1-2-3)	Sunrise Records (private collection)
2005	Strangely Strange but Oddly Normal (compilation box set)	Island-Universal Records 9822950
2008	The Clouds Scrapbook (reissue CD & Download)	Island-Universal Records
2009	Strangely Strange but Oddly Normal (compilation box set reissue)	Universal UMC8472
2010	Up Above Our Heads [Clouds 1966-71] (2CD anthology)	BGO/EMI BGOCD966
2017	The Clouds Scrapbook (mini CD reissue)	Belle172832
2017	Up Above Our Heads (mini CD reissue)	Belle172833
2017	Watercolour Days (mini CD reissue)	Belle172834
2017	Scrapbook (box set of 3 albums)	Belle
2018	The Clouds Scrapbook (digital release 20/4)	Blue Raincoat
2018	Up Above Our Heads (digital release 20/4)	Blue Raincoat
2018	Watercolour Days (digital release 20/4)	Blue Raincoat
2018	Up Above Our Heads [Clouds 1966-71] (digital release 20/4)	Blue Raincoat
2025	Once Upon a Time - The Collection (box set of 3 albums)	Chrysalis CRC1762
2025	The Clouds Scrapbook (vinyl reissue)	Chrysalis CRA-001
