= Peter Weltner =

Peter Weltner is a German organist and keyboardist, specialising in the Hammond organ.

== Biography ==
Weltner started playing the piano at the age of six. He obtained his first Hammond at the age of 24, but did not take up the instrument professionally until 2001 at the age of 50. He formed a duo with a succession of drummers, relying on the Hammond to carry the rest of the band's sound. His duo tours Germany on a regular basis.

Weltner claims that his music covers a mix of jazz, blues, rock, swing and soul, stating "With us, you get everything - from the romantic, almost tender whisper, up to the roaring stage monster." He has recently endorsed Hammond's SK2 dual manual organ. and uses a 20 note pedalboard. An extraordinary experiment created by Weltner the concert Epiphany 2014 in the Church 'Holy Cross' to Soest (Ger). He played the church organ and Hammond organ simultaneously. This one-hour concert was recorded on DVD Orgel Rendezvous.

== Discography ==
- Hammond Daze is Born! (2009)
- Inspiration (2012)
- Orgel Rendezvous (DVD, Film-Team Novalis, 2014)
