= Peter Daltrey =

English painter

- Born: Peter James Daltrey; 25 March 1946 (age 80); Bow, London, England
- Occupations: Singer; songwriter; musician
- Instruments: Vocals; keyboards
- Years active: 1967–present
- Formerly of: Kaleidoscope; Fairfield Parlour

Peter James Daltrey (born 25 March 1946) is an English musician. He has been the lead singer and chief songwriter for the bands Kaleidoscope and Fairfield Parlour. He is also a solo artist.

== Biography ==
After the demise of the bands Kaleidoscope and Fairfield Parlour, Daltrey concentrated on his solo recording projects. His first album, Dream On (Voiceprint VP182), was released on the British Voiceprint label in 1995, followed by two albums released in Japan: English Roses (Evangel EV001-1995) and When We Were Indians (Evangel EV003–1996).

In 1997, Daltrey worked with Universal Records on the compilation album Dive into Yesterday (Fontana 534003-02), a collection of tracks from Kaleidoscope's two 1960s albums. The band re-emerged from obscurity with reissues of their albums, beginning in 1987; their "lost" double concept album, White Faced Lady (UFO BFTP 001), was released in 1991.

In 1997 Daltrey was invited by the Dutch composer and instrumentalist Arjen Anthony Lucassen (Ayreon) to work with him on his double concept album, Into the Electric Castle. He also contributed two titles on the album Transmission (TM-014 International 1998). In 2004, he appeared shortly on the Ayreon album The Human Equation, reprising his role from Into the Electric Castle, and the following year sang on the re-release of Ayreon's first album, The Final Experiment, providing lead vocals for an acoustic version of "Nature's Dance".

A fan of Clifford T. Ward, Daltrey was guest of honour at an October 1998 convention where he delivered a speech of appreciation.

Blueprint Records released a collection of Daltrey's best solo work in 1999 on Candy: The Best of Peter Daltrey (Blueprint BP304CD). The turn of the century saw the release of Daltrey's album Tambourine Days (Chelsea Records CDCR 000110), with the title track looking back at his earlier career, and the many friends who had shared that long frustrating road.

In 2000, Daltrey began a collaboration with the New Orleans-based singer-songwriter Damien Youth. Their first album, Nevergreen (Chelsea Records CDCR 002110). was released that year. This was followed by two more solo albums, Heroine (Chelsea Records CDCR 100110) in 2001 and The Last Detail (Chelsea Records CDCR 209010) in September 2002. The collaboration with Youth continued in November 2002 with the release of their second album, Tattoo (Chelsea Records CDCR 201110). Two months later, Daltrey's first solo single was released on Earworm Records, "(Love Song) For Annie" / "Gypsy Gypsy" (with Damien Youth) (Earworm Records).

In April 2003, after the discovery of some rare Kaleidoscope acetate discs, the band authorised their release,Kaleidoscope - The Sidekicks Sessions (CD Alchemy). In September, BBC recordings were released, Please Listen to the Pictures (Circle Records CPWL/CPWC 104), its cover art featuring many photographs and clippings from Daltrey's extensive band archive. The following month he released Pittsburg Warhola (Chelsea Records CDCR 300110) under the pen name Link Bekka. He and Youth then formed the Morning Set band, and released their first album, The Morning Set, at the end of 2006.

In 2007, Link Bekka released two more albums: The Madness of King Bekka (Chelsea Records CDCR 707010) and Saharaville (Chelsea Records CDCR 709010). In 2009, Link Bekka collaborated with the saxophonist Derek G Head for the album Jacks Town, an appreciation of the work of Jack Kerouac. The same year saw the release of Bekka's album Fractured, followed in 2010 by Erinnern. Also released in that year was the Daltrey double CD album Heroine / Tattoo, on the Rocket Girl label.

In 2011 Global Recording Artists label released the Daltrey compilation album on CD, King of Thieves. 2015 saw his album The Life of a Butterfly. A collaboration with musician Mark Mortimer resulted in their album on vinyl and CD, Running through Chelsea, on Think Lika a Key Records. The label then released Daltrey's solo album on vinyl and CD, The Leopard and the Lamb, followed in November 2024 by his 23rd album, The Rhymer in the Long-Tongued Room.

Daltrey contributed a chapter to a pictorial book on the Isle of Wight Festival 1970, together with a TV documentary of the event. He then released an album with Philly psych band The Asteroid #4.

His son, Oli, was involved in The Fog Band from 2000 to 2006.

== Discography ==
=== With Kaleidoscope/Fairfield Parlour ===
- Tangerine Dream (1967)
- Faintly Blowing (1969)
- From Home to Home (1970)
- White Faced Lady (1991)

=== Solo ===
- Dream On (1995)
- English Roses (1995)
- When We Were Indians (1996)
- Candy: The Best of Peter Daltrey (1999)
- Tambourine Days (2000)
- Nevergreen (2000) (with Damien Youth)
- Heroine (2001)
- The Last Detail (2002)
- Tattoo (2002) (with Damien Youth)
- Pittsburg Warhola (2003) (as Link Bekka)
- The Morning Set (2007) (with Damien Youth as The Morning Set)
- The Madness of King Bekka (2007) (as Link Bekka)
- Saharaville (2007) (as Link Bekka)
- Jack's Town (2008) (as Link Bekka)
- Fractured (2009) (as Link Bekka)
- Errinern (2010) (as Link Bekka)
- Heroine Tattoo (2010) (with Damien Youth)
- King of Thieves: The Best of Peter Daltrey/Volume 2 (2011)
- The Life of a Butterfly (2015) (with Damien Youth and Mike Dole)
- Running through Chelsea (2023) (with Mark Mortimer)
- The Leopard and the Lamb (2023)
- The Rhymer in the Long-Tongued Room (2024)
- The Life and Times of Blue Larry and the Huguenot Kid (2025)

=== With The Asteroid #4 ===
- The Journey (2012)

== Bibliography ==
- Daltrey, Peter (2011). Tambourine Days. Blurb Books UK.
