= Sampler album =

Type of compilation album

A sampler or promotional compilation is a type of compilation album generally offered at a reduced price to showcase an artist or a selection of artists signed to a particular record label. The format became popular in the late 1960s as record labels sought to promote artists whose works were primarily available in album rather than single format, and therefore had little opportunity to gain exposure through singles-dominated radio airplay. Most samplers showcased already-released material, so that as they sampled artists they also sampled the albums from which their tracks were drawn. The term "album sampler" is also used in cases where an album is distributed among multiple records in case of, for example, vinyl where the maximum play time is less than the length of the full album. In these cases, album sampler titles may be added to each vinyl.

== Early samplers ==
RCA Victor is credited with pioneering the concept of a sampling of a label's artists with its 1949 release Theme Songs. The album set was issued on four discs in both 78 rpm and 45 rpm formats, and featured eight of the label's orchestras.

Elektra Records' A Folk Music Sampler was released in 1954, initially for radio stations and later reissued for retail sales. Jac Holzman of Elektra wrote:

"I was...searching for a way to take our specialized and distinctive catalog and have it heard by many people. As a fanatical moviegoer, I knew the value of the film trailer. I translated that to the record business. My concept...was a sampler LP: a collection of musical trailers, a compendium of carefully assembled material, with lyrics and notes, all on a 10-inch LP that would sell for a bargain price unheard of in 1954: $2.00...I inserted a "sampler clause" in all new artists' contracts, allowing me to use one track from any album, royalty-free...With no royalty obligation and only the raw cost of manufacturing to consider, a good sampler could net between ten and twenty thousand dollars. This was the best of all possible worlds. We were actively promoting our records, the public was paying for the privilege and getting good value in return, and Elektra was being fertilized by the profits."

The term "sampler" historically referred to a demonstration of needlework, and this was the first time the word had been applied to a musical compilation. Holzman was enthusiastic for the format, and Elektra regularly issued budget-priced samplers of its folk catalogue in the USA throughout the 1950s and 60s. In the UK, Elektra's office decided to use issue samplers to try to position the label in the marketplace, and issued the folk sampler Fantastic Folk (1968) before the more rock-oriented Select Elektra (1968). However, these British discs were full price issues.

Columbia Records experimented with samplers in its 1956 release Having Wonderful Time, Wish You Would Hear . . . . In June 1961, Columbia released a two-disk sampler titled Stars for a Summer Night. One disk provided largely easy listening selections. The second record in the set was released as a Columbia Masterworks disk, with 13 tracks of classical compositions. The album became one of the best-selling records of the year.

== Budget samplers in Europe ==
CBS’s The Rock Machine Turns You On, Liberty Records' Gutbucket, Warner Bros.' The 1969 Warner/Reprise Songbook (first of the long-standing Warner/Reprise Loss Leaders series), and Island Records' You Can All Join In were the first samplers issued in the UK and Europe at a discount price, setting the standard for those to follow. Many of the most important and innovative folk and rock artists of the time featured on the samplers of their respective record labels, particularly in the UK, and as a result their work reached an audience which would have otherwise been inaccessible. Amongst the most well regarded, and subsequently collectable, were those from Island Records, CBS, Decca Records, Liberty Records, Vertigo Records and Harvest Records. By the end of the 1970s, however, the format became less relevant.

The rise of indie rock labels (e.g. Chiswick Records and Stiff Records in the UK) and bands in the late 1970s and early 1980s revitalised the sampler as a marketing tool, but the format was all but dead by 1985. Since then, the increased influence of the World Wide Web as a medium for distributing content has made the sampler album format increasingly redundant.
