= Billy Ritchie (musician) =

Scottish musician (born 1944)

- Born: William Edward Ritchie; 20 April 1944 (age 82); Lanark, Scotland
- Genres: Progressive rock
- Occupations: Musician, songwriter, arranger
- Instruments: Keyboards, piano
- Years active: 1966–1971
- Labels: Island; Chrysalis; Deram; BGO Records/EMI
- Website: cloudsmusic.com

William Edward Ritchie (born 20 April 1944) is a Scottish keyboard player and composer. Formerly a member of The Satellites, The Premiers, 1-2-3, and Clouds, he is generally acknowledged as being the first keyboard player in rock music to stand and take a leading role, thereby providing a model for others such as Keith Emerson and Rick Wakeman. He is also credited as being responsible for rewriting standard songs and arranging music in a style that later became fashionable as progressive rock. During a Saville Theatre concert in 1967, he introduced a then-unknown David Bowie to Jimi Hendrix.

== Biography ==
Ritchie grew up in the Scottish village of Forth in Lanarkshire. He began playing harmonica at an early age, and when a neighbour threw out a piano, and Ritchie's parents took it in, Ritchie, at the age of 8, began playing semi-seriously, but as an almost secret activity. In 1960, Ritchie's friends, Johnny Moffat (vocals), Robert 'Flam' Fleming (guitar) (b. December 1943), William 'Big Wull' Ritchie (guitar, Billy Ritchie's cousin), Jim Stark (drums), and Duncan Blair (bass), formed a band called The Satellites. When asked what he would play, Ritchie decided to play electric organ, much to the bemusement of his friends. Organs were not in common use in guitar-orientated bands of that time.

In 1964, a band called The Premiers, based in Edinburgh, whose members were Ian Ellis (vocals), James 'Shammy' Lafferty (rhythm guitar), Derek Stark (lead guitar), Bill Lawrence (bass), and Harry Hughes(drums), decided to recruit an organist to augment their sound, and Ritchie joined. The addition prompted more changes than was intended, and despite an early success in being recorded at Radio Luxembourg in London by Cyril Stapleton, the band quickly fragmented. Derek Stark left because he felt that the organ had supplanted his role as lead musician; Bill Lawrence left following a dispute with Ian Ellis; James 'Shammy' Lafferty left because of family problems. The three remaining members, Ian Ellis, Harry Hughes, and Billy Ritchie decided to take the music in a radically new direction, and renamed the band 1-2-3.

1-2-3 was one of the earliest bands to play a form of inventive rock music that became a blueprint for what would later be called progressive rock. The band's set consisted of standard pop and blues songs, but in Ritchie's hands, these pieces were studiously reshaped and rewritten, to become, in essence, new. There was nothing remotely like it around. The set included early rewritten versions of songs by David Bowie (I Dig Everything) and Paul Simon (America, The Sounds of Silence), both completely unknown at that time.

Some months after their debut at La Bamba club in Falkirk, 1-2-3 decided that the band would have more chance of success in London, where they arrived in February 1967. A 'legendary' residency at the Marquee club quickly followed, and the band were signed to Brian Epstein and NEMS management. Following Epstein's death however, manager Robert Stigwood failed to capitalise on the momentum of the Marquee performances, and the band left NEMS late in 1967.

1-2-3 was then signed to The Ellis-Wright Agency, which would soon be called Chrysalis, and the most commercially successful part of the band's career began, under the new name of Clouds. Several major tours and three albums and several single releases followed, but real success proved elusive, and the band broke up in October 1971.

== Instrumentation and playing style ==
Ritchie's first stage keyboard was a Hohner Clavinet, which he mounted on stilts so he could stand and play, rather than sit as was the norm. Unfortunately, this arrangement caused much merriment, as the clavinet looked like a spider with its spindly legs. Bemused audience members would ask why Ritchie was standing at a table while the band played. When Ritchie joined The Premiers, the band prevailed upon him to buy a Vox organ, much more de rigueur for the times, and this became his instrument of choice until supplanted by a Hammond M102 in 1966 then a Hammond C3 in 1969.

An early feature of Ritchie's playing was his innovative use of two hands playing solos in unison or harmony, which gave his sound a double strength. Most keyboard players of the early era, especially those using a single keyboard, tended to focus on the use of right hand, supplemented by chord stabs or supportive left-hand work. More often than not, keyboard player's left hands would be in use mainly for changing drawbar sounds or settings rather than playing. In the case of Ritchie, the playing would consist of almost two right hands, each with equal strength and speed, resulting in an especially dynamic sound and approach that was difficult for anyone else to emulate or copy.

Ritchie was one of the first players to use the Hammond organ to create a dramatic effect when, often at the end of a particular song, he would throw the M102 to the stage floor, thereby causing the internal reverb unit to create an explosion of sound to shock the audience. During solos, by pushing the Hammond upwards and forwards with his right thigh, he would raise it at an angle, displaying the keyboards to the audience, tilting and moving the instrument as he played. However, these flashes of showmanship were limited to occasional rather than frequent displays. Ritchie was, in the main, a fairly introvert and undemonstrative player in terms of showmanship, and this left a gap for the concept to be taken to its logical conclusion some time later by the more extrovert Keith Emerson, who, thanks to his supreme showmanship as well as his fine playing, would become, in the public mind at least, the epitome of a rock organist.

== Legacy ==
Over subsequent years, because of lack of public perception, Ritchie has at times been accused of being influenced by those, who, in reality, were influenced by him. Only some years later, thanks to accolades from David Bowie and others, would Billy Ritchie be properly credited for the pioneering role he played in the development of electric keyboards in popular music. Similarly belated credit was given to the pioneering role of 1-2-3 and Ritchie's innovative arrangements. The band's distinctive guitar-less organ-driven sound is now viewed as a definitive precursor to the progressive rock movement. Billy Ritchie was described as 'a genius'. In 2016, Sky TV's documentary Trailblazers of Prog described Billy Ritchie and 1-2-3 as "Prog Rock's True Genesis".

== Discography ==
For Ritchie's work with Clouds, see Clouds discography.

- 1969 Cover of "Scrapbook" written by Billy Ritchie, recorded by Clodagh Rogers on album, Midnight Clodagh RCA SF8071
- 1969 Cover of "Broken Puppet" written by Billy Ritchie recorded by New World but unreleased
- 1981 Produced Jona Lewie "Rearranging the Deckchairs on the Titanic" single - Stiff Records BUY 131
- 1981 Cover of "Song of the Sea" written by Billy Ritchie recorded by Turbo on album You Girl CBS84117
- 2010 Cover of "Mind of a Child" written by Clouds recorded by Rob Clarke & the Wooltones on album A Phase We're Going Through Fruits de Mer volume 11

== See also ==
- List of Hammond organ players
