= Nirvana (British band) =

British psychedelic pop band

- Nirvana in 1967. From left to right: Brian Henderson, Michael Coe, Alex Spyropoulos, Sylvia A. Schuster and Patrick Campbell-Lyons

Background information
- Origin: London, England
- Genres: Psychedelic pop; baroque pop; progressive rock; pop rock
- Years active: 1966–1971, 1985–2026
- Labels: Island; Pye International; Vertigo; Demon; Edsel
- Past members: Patrick Campbell-Lyons; Alex Spyropoulos; Ray Singer

Nirvana were an English rock band formed in London in 1966. In 1985, the band reformed. Members of the band sued the American grunge band Nirvana in 1992 over the usage of the name, reaching an out-of-court settlement.

== History ==
=== 1966–1971: Early years ===
Nirvana was created as the performing arm of the London-based songwriting partnership of Irish musician Patrick Campbell-Lyons and Greek composer Alex Spyropoulos (born George Alex Spyropoulos, 13 August 1940, Athens, Greece) and English producer Ray Singer (born 1946). On their recordings, Campbell-Lyons, Ray Singer and Spyropoulos supplied all the vocals. Campbell-Lyons contributed on guitars, and Spyropoulos contributed on some keyboards. Musically, Campbell-Lyons and Spyropoulos blended rock, pop, folk, jazz, Latin rhythms and classical music, primarily augmented by baroque chamber-style arrangements.

In October 1967, they released their first album, a concept album produced by Chris Blackwell titled The Story of Simon Simopath. The album was one of the first narrative concept albums ever released, predating story-driven concept albums such as The Pretty Things's S.F. Sorrow (December 1968), The Who's Tommy (April 1969) and The Kinks's Arthur (September 1969). Island Records launched Nirvana's first album "with a live show at the Saville Theatre, sharing a bill with fellow label acts Traffic, Spooky Tooth, and Jackie Edwards."

Unable to perform their songs live as a duo, Campbell-Lyons and Spyropoulos decided to create a live performing ensemble, the Nirvana Ensemble, and recruited four musicians. Though hired to be part of the live performance group rather than as band members, these four musicians were also included in the photograph alongside the core duo on the album cover of their first album to assist in projecting an image of a group rather than a duo. However, within a few months, Nirvana had reverted to its original two-person line-up. The four musicians who augmented Campbell-Lyons and Spyropoulos on their live appearances and television shows for those few months were Ray Singer (guitar), Brian Henderson (bass), Sylvia A. Schuster (cello) and Michael Coe (French horn, viola). Sue and Sunny also participated in providing their vocals.

The band appeared on French television with Salvador Dalí, who splashed black paint on them during a performance of their third single, "Rainbow Chaser". Campbell-Lyons kept the jacket but regretted that Dalí did not sign any of their paint-splashed clothes. Island Records allegedly sent the artist an invoice for the cleaning of Schuster's cello.

Following the minor chart success of "Rainbow Chaser", "live appearances became increasingly rare" and the songwriting duo at the core of Nirvana "decided to disband the sextet" and to rely on session musicians for future recordings. Spyropoulos cited Schuster's departure due to pregnancy as the instigator for the band returning to its core membership. Campbell-Lyons also cited the high cost of having the additional members as a reason for their departure. Schuster later became the principal cellist of the BBC Symphony Orchestra.

In 1968, Nirvana recorded their second album, All of Us, which featured a similarly broad range of musical styles as their first album. After the release of the album, Ray Singer left the group to produce Peter Sarstedt.

Their third album, Black Flower, was rejected by Blackwell, who compared it disparagingly to Francis Lai's A Man and a Woman. Under the title To Markos III (supposedly named for a "rich uncle" of Spyropoulos who helped finance the album), it was released in the UK on the Pye label in May 1970, though reportedly only 250 copies were pressed and it was deleted shortly after. One track, "Christopher Lucifer", was a jibe at Blackwell.

In 1971, the duo separated, with Campbell-Lyons the primary contributor to the next two Nirvana albums, Local Anaesthetic (1971), and Songs of Love And Praise (1972), the latter featuring the return of Sylvia Schuster. Campbell-Lyons subsequently worked as a solo artist and issued further albums: Me and My Friend (1973), The Electric Plough (1981), and The Hero I Might Have Been (1983).

=== 1985–present ===
The duo reunited in 1985, touring Europe and releasing a compilation album, Black Flower (Bam-Caruso, 1987). (Black Flower had been the original planned title of their third album.) In the 1990s, two further albums were released. Secret Theatre (1994) and Orange and Blue (1996), which contained previously unreleased material, including a flower-power cover of the song "Lithium" originally recorded by the Seattle grunge band of the same name, Nirvana. According to the band's official website, this was intended as part of a tongue-in-cheek album called Nirvana Sings Nirvana that was aborted when lead singer Kurt Cobain died. When the recording was presented on the Orange and Blue album, Campbell-Lyons's liner notes treated it seriously and with allusion to Heathcliff from Wuthering Heights. Also, according to the website, the band still wanted to open for Hole even after Cobain's death.

The original group filed a lawsuit in California against the Seattle grunge band of the same name, who played at Reading Festival in 1992, in 1992. The matter was settled out of court on undisclosed terms that apparently allowed both bands to continue using the name and issuing new recordings without any packaging disclaimers or caveats to distinguish one Nirvana from the other. Music writer Everett True has claimed that Kurt Cobain's record label, Geffen, paid $100,000 to the 1960s band to permit the 1990s band's continued use of the name.

In 1999, they released a three-disc CD anthology titled Chemistry, including twelve previously unreleased tracks and some new material. Their first three albums were reissued on CD by Universal Records in 2003. In 2005, Universal (Japan) reissued Local Anaesthetic and Songs of Love And Praise. In 2018, a new album was released on the Island label Rainbow Chaser: The 60s Recordings (The Island Years), which featured the first two albums in a double CD package, featuring 52 tracks with 27 previously unreleased outtakes, demos and alternative versions. In April 2026, Campbell-Lyons died.

== Musical styles and techniques ==
The group were in the school of baroque-flavoured, melodic pop-rock music typified by the Beach Boys of Pet Sounds and "God Only Knows", the Zombies of Odessey and Oracle and "Time of the Season". The majority of the tracks on Nirvana's albums fell into the broad genre of contemporary popular music, sometime described as chamber strand of progressive rock, soft rock or orchestral pop and chamber pop.

The Nirvana song "Rainbow Chaser" is thought to be the first-ever British recording to feature the audio effect known as phasing or flanging throughout an entire track, as distinct from occasionally within a song such as the Small Faces in "Itchycoo Park". Phasing was, by 1967, identified with psychedelia, and "Rainbow Chaser" achieved number 34 in UK Singles Chart during May 1968.

== Notable collaborators ==
Nirvana's producers, arrangers, engineers and mixers included:

- Chris Blackwell, Island Records' founder, produced the band before hitting his production stride in the 1970s with Bob Marley
- Tony Visconti, arranger and producer, worked with David Bowie, Marc Bolan, the Moody Blues and U2, among others
- Mike Vickers, a former Manfred Mann multi-instrumentalist who undertook arrangement work for Nirvana in 1967 and 1968
- Jimmy Miller, the US-born producer, worked with them immediately before starting his five-album streak producing the Rolling Stones, including the Beggars Banquet, Exile On Main Street and Goats Head Soup albums.
- Chris Thomas, the producer, whose credits include the Beatles, Procol Harum, Roxy Music, Pink Floyd (mixed The Dark Side of the Moon), the Sex Pistols and INXS.
- Guy Stevens, A&R executive and producer, before his production work with Mott the Hoople.
- Brian Humphries, the recording engineer, started engineering Nirvana before going on to work with Traffic, Black Sabbath, McDonald and Giles and Pink Floyd (eventually engineering their acclaimed Wish You Were Here and Animals albums).

Mike Weighell also contributed at the beginning of the 1970s. Others who worked on production with Nirvana include Muff Winwood (formerly of the Spencer Davis Group); arranger/producer Mike Hurst, who worked with Jimmy Page, Cat Stevens, Manfred Mann, the Spencer Davis Group, Colin Blunstone; and arranger Johnny Scott, who arranged for the Hollies and subsequently scored films such as The Shooting Party and Greystoke.

Top musicians who played on Nirvana sessions include Lesley Duncan, Big Jim Sullivan, Herbie Flowers, Billy Bremner (later of Rockpile/Dave Edmunds fame), Luther Grosvenor, Clem Cattini and the full line-up of rock band Spooky Tooth. Patrick Joseph Kelly (keyboards) also co-wrote the "Modus Operandi" track on the Local Anaesthetic album.

== Discography ==
=== Studio albums ===
- The Story of Simon Simopath (Island 1967)
- The existence of chance is everything and nothing while the greatest achievement is the living of life and so say ALL OF US (Island 1968)
- Dedicated to Markos III (Pye 1970) a.k.a. To Markos III a.k.a. Black Flower
- Local Anaesthetic (Vertigo 1971)
- Songs of Love and Praise (Philips 1972)
- Me And My Friend (1974) Patrick Campbell-Lyons's first solo album, but marketed as a Nirvana album when released on CD (on which most of the tracks of Songs of Love and Praise were also included)
- Orange and Blue (Edsel 1996)
- Secrets (Madfish 2023)

=== Compilations ===
- Black Flower (Bam-Caruso 1987) (LP compilation)
- Travelling on a Cloud (Edsel 1992) (CD compilation)
- Secret Theatre (Edsel 1994) (CD compilation of rarities and outtakes)
- Chemistry (Edsel 1997) (3CD retrospective)
- Forever Changing - An Introduction To (Island 2003) (CD compilation)
- Cult (Burger 2012) (2LP compilation)
- Rainbow Chaser: The 60s Recordings (The Island Years) (Universal 2018) (2CD compilation)

=== Singles ===
- "Tiny Goddess" (July 1967) – UK No. 62 (Note: Chart position is from the official UK "Breakers List".)
- "Pentecost Hotel" (October 1967) – UK No. 56
- "Rainbow Chaser" (March 1968) – UK No. 34
- "Girl in the Park" (July 1968)
- "All of Us" (November 1968)
- "Wings of Love" (January 1969)
- "Oh! What a Performance" (May 1969)
- "The Picture of Dorian Gray" (September 1981)
