= Dick Leahy =

British music industry executive (1937–2020)

- Born: Derek Joseph Patrick Leahy; 20 May 1937; Hornchurch, Essex
- Died: August 30, 2020 (aged 83)
- Occupation: Music industry executive

Derek Joseph Patrick Leahy (20 May 1937 – 30 August 2020) was a British music industry executive. Leahy first came to prominence as A&R manager at Philips Records in the late 1960s. He managed the Bell Records label in the early 1970s, which had a string of hits in the U.K. He formed the equally successful label GTO Records in 1974 before moving into music publishing in the 1980s, notably working with Wham! and George Michael.

== Biography ==
Derek (Dick) Joseph Patrick Leahy was born on 20 May 1937 in Hornchurch, Essex, to Patrick Leahy, an Irishman who worked at the Ford Motor Company's automotive factory in nearby Dagenham, and Gladys (née Jackson). One of six children, Leahy was educated at grammar school, after which he served his national service and worked various jobs until in the late 60s, he was appointed A & R manager at Fontana Records, a subsidiary of Philips Records, responsible for a stable of artists including Dusty Springfield, the Pretty Things and The Walker Brothers. There, Ken Howard, manager of Dave Dee, Dozy, Beaky, Mick & Tich, described him as "a real livewire - the person at Philips who was most on top of what was new and happening".

In the early 1970s, he joined Bell Records, overseeing the establishment of the American company's independent label in the U.K., and achieving success in the U.K. with Tony Orlando and Dawn, David Cassidy, Gary Glitter, The Drifters, The Delfonics, Barry Blue, Showaddywaddy and Slik. He signed the Bay City Rollers to the label after seeing them performing in a club in Edinburgh, saying "I really couldn't hear what they were playing or singing. All I could hear was this constant screaming." In 1974, Leahy teamed with fellow music executive Laurence Myers to form the independent label GTO Records. After a string of hit records with the likes of Donna Summer, The Walker Brothers, The Dooleys, Heatwave, Billy Ocean and Dana, the label was sold to CBS in 1977.

Leahy left the label in 1981 to form a music publishing business with Bryan Morrison, former manager of the Pretty Things. In 1982, they signed a publishing agreement with Wham! on the strength of their demo material. After the duo split in 1986, Leahy continued as George Michael's music publisher and confidante.

Leahy was married twice with four children. He died on 30 August 2020.
