= Patrick Campbell-Lyons =

Irish composer and musician (1943–2026)

- Campbell-Lyons in 1970
- Born: July 13, 1943
- Died: April 13, 2026 (aged 82)

Patrick Campbell-Lyons (13 July 1943 – 13 April 2026) was an Irish composer and musician who was a member of the cult symphonic-rock band Nirvana, formed in London in 1967.

== Life and career ==
Campbell-Lyons, a native of Lismore, County Waterford, was part of the West London music scene from the early 1960s playing in several bands. He was the vocalist and a founding member of a locally-popular R&B band Second Thoughts whose lineups included future record producer Chris Thomas, Thunderclap Newman founder/drummer Speedy Keen and two future members of prog-rock band Jade Warrior (Jon Field and Tony Duhig). Second Thoughts split up in late 1965 and after a year living in Sweden, Campbell-Lyons returned to London in late 1966.

In early 1967 he formed Nirvana with Greek musician Alex Spyropoulos. The duo (augmented in the studio and live by a floating line-up of session musicians) created a series of critically acclaimed baroque, orchestrated albums before disbanding in the early 1970s.

He then pursued a career in the music business as an A&R executive and producer - while continuing to occasionally record solo albums including Me & My Friend, The Electric Plough and The Hero I Might Have Been.

Campbell-Lyons' first solo album Me & My Friend was reissued on CD in 2001 in the UK by Market Square Records together with bonus tracks from one of Nirvana's later albums Songs of Love and Praise.

In early July 2008, Campbell-Lyons started to write a book, Psychedelic Days, about his life and times in 1960’s London and beyond.

In 2017 he released a new album on the Market Square Records Label called You're a Cloud, I'm a Comet released on 180-gramme vinyl LP with CD included.

Campbell-Lyons died on 13 April 2026, aged 82.
