= The Pretty Things discography =

- Studio albums: 14
- EPs: 7
- Live albums: 14
- Compilation albums: 32
- Singles: 34
- Collaborative albums: 4
- Stock music albums: 5

The English rock group The Pretty Things have released 13 studio albums, 14 live albums, 33 compilation albums, 7 extended play singles, and 34 singles.

== Studio albums ==
Year	Album details	Chart positions		
Year	Album details	US	AUS	UK
1965	The Pretty Things: Released: March 1965; Label: Fontana (TL 5239); Format: LP	—	—	6
1965	Get the Picture?: Released: December 1965; Label: Fontana (TL 5280); Format: LP	—	—	—
1967	Emotions: Released: 18 April 1967; Label: Fontana (TL 5425); Format: LP	—	—	—
1968	S.F. Sorrow: Released: December 1968; Label: Columbia (SCX 6306); Format: LP	—	—	—
1970	Parachute: Released: June 1970; Label: Harvest (SHVL 774); Formats: LP, cassette	—	—	43
1972	Freeway Madness: Released: December 1972; Label: Warner Bros. (K 46190); Formats: LP, 8-track	—	51	—
1974	Silk Torpedo: Released: 1 November 1974; Label: Swan Song (SSK 59400); Formats: LP, cassette, 8-track	104	—	—
1976	Savage Eye: Released: January 1976; Label: Swan Song (SSK 59401); Formats: LP, cassette, 8-track	163	—	—
1980	Cross Talk: Released: August 1980; Label: Warner Bros. (K56842); Formats: LP, cassette	—	—	—
1987	Out of the Island: Released: 1987; Label: in-akustik (inak 8708 CD); Format: CD	—	—	—
1999	... Rage Before Beauty: Released: 9 March 1999; Label: Snapper Music (SMACD 814); Format: CD	—	—	—
2007	Balboa Island: Released: May 2007; Label: Cadiz (CBCD 07001); Format: CD	—	—	—
2015	The Sweet Pretty Things (Are in Bed Now, of Course...): Released: 10 July 2015; Label: Repertoire (V 166) [LP] (REPUK 1265) [CD]; Formats: LP, CD	—	—	—
2020	Bare as Bone, Bright as Blood: Released: 25 September 2020; Label: Madfish Music; Formats: LP, CD	—	—	—
"—" denotes a release that did not chart.

== Live albums ==
Year	Album details
1984	Live at Heartbreak Hotel: Released: December 1984; Label: Big Beat (WIK 24); Format: LP
1992	On Air: Original BBC Recordings: Released: 1992; Label: Band of Joy (boj cd 003); Format: CD
1998	Resurrection: Released: 26 January 1999; Label: World Wide Tribe (160042); Format: CD
2003	The BBC Sessions: Released: 25 November 2003; Label: Repertoire (REP 4938); Format: 2xCD
2006	40th Anniversary – Live in Brighton: Released 21 November 2006; Label: Snapper (SDVD520); Format: DVD/CD
2014	Live at the 100 Club: Released: 2014; Label: LMS Mobile Recording Studio (LMS 001 LP); Format: LP
2014	Live at Rockpalast: Released: 23 December 2014; Label: Repertoire (REPUK 1204); Format: 2xDVD/CD, 2xLP
2015	Live at the BBC: Released: 18 May 2015; Label: Repertoire (REPUK 1205); Format: 4xCD
2016	Live at the BBC: Released: 30 September 2016; Label: Repertoire (REP 2297); Format: 2xLP
2018	BBC 1964-1967: Released: 2018; Label: No Kidding (NK201803); Format: LP
2018	Singapore Silk Torpedo Live at the BBC & Other Broadcasts: Released: 28 September 2018; Label: Repertoire (REPUK1327); Format: 2xCD/DVD, FLAC
2018	Live at the BBC Paris Theatre – 1974: Released: 21 December 2018; Label: Repertoire (V305); Format: LP, FLAC
2019	The Final Bow: Released: 1 November 2019; Label: Madfish (SMABX1139); Formats: 2xCD/2xDVD/10" vinyl, 2xLP
2021	Live at the BBC: Released: 28 May 2021 DD, 25 June 2021 LP, 2 July 2021 CD; Label: Repertoire (REPUK1373) [CD], (V342) [LP]; Format: 6xCD, 3xLP, DD

== Electric Banana ==
Electric Banana was a pseudonymous 1967 album of the band. When the album was released, the stage name the Electric Banana was used to hide the band's identity. The band recorded this album and four subsequent ones for the De Wolfe Music Library. De Wolfe provided stock music for film soundtracks. The Electric Banana music wound up on various horror and soft-porn films of the late 1960s. Films which have used their music include What's Good for the Goose (1969). The song "It'll Never Be Me" featured in the 1973 Doctor Who story The Green Death. The song "Cause I'm a Man" appeared in George A. Romero's horror classic Dawn of the Dead (1978) and was reissued on Trunk Records' 2004 compilation album Dawn of the Dead: The Unreleased Incidental Music.

=== Stock music albums ===
Year	Album details
1967	Electric Banana (with Tilsley Orchestral): Released: 1967; Label: De Wolfe (DW/LP 3040); Formats: LP, 10"
1968	More Electric Banana: Released: 1968; Label: De Wolfe (DW/LP 3069); Formats: LP
1969	Even More Electric Banana: Released: 1969; Label: De Wolfe (DW/LP 3123); Formats: LP
1973	Hot Licks: Released: 1973; Label: De Wolfe (DWS/LP 3284); Formats: LP
1978	The Return of the Electric Banana: Released: 1979; Label: De Wolfe (DWS/LP 3381); Formats: LP

=== Compilation albums ===
Other compilation albums of these recordings have been released under "The Pretty Things" name, see below.

Year	Album details
1978	The Seventies: Released: 1978; Label: Butt (NOTT 001); Format: LP
1978	The Sixties: Released: 1980; Label: Butt (NOTT 003); Format: LP
1997	Blows Your Mind: Released: 1997; Label: Tenth Planet (TP031); Formats: LP, CD
2004	Rave Up with...: Released: 2004; Label: Guerssen (GUESS018; GUPEN02); Format: LP
2011	Psychedelic Essentials: Released: 2011; Label: Purple Pyramid (886788171640); Format: CD-R
2019	The Complete DeWolfe Sessions: Released: 27 September 2019; Label: Grapefruit (CRSEGBOX058); Format:3xCD

== Collaborative albums ==
Year	Album details
as Pretty Things & the Yardbird Blues Band (May and Taylor with Jim McCarty of the Yardbirds)
1991	The Chicago Blues Tapes 1991: Released: 1991; Label: Demon (FIEND CD 708); Format: CD
1993	Wine, Women & Whiskey: Released: 1993; Label: Demon (FIENDCD748); Format: CD
as Pretty Things 'N Mates (May and Taylor with members of the Inmates and Matthew Fisher of Procol Harum)
1994	A Whiter Shade of Dirty Water: Released: 1994; Label: Kingdom Records (CDKVL 9031); Format: CD; Note: Reissued as Rockin' the Garage
As Pretty Things & Philippe Debarge
2009	The Pretty Things/Philippe DeBarge: Released: 18 February 2009; Label: Ugly Things (UTCD-2207); Formats: CD, LP; Note: Reissued as Rock St. Trop

== Compilation albums ==
Year	Album details
1975	Greatest Hits 1964–1967: Released: 1975; Label: Philips (6625 015); Format: 2xLP
1976	Real Pretty: Released: 1976; Label: Rare Earth (R7-549R2); Format: 2xLP
1976	The Vintage Years: Released: 1976; Label: Sire (SASH-3713-2); Format: 2xLP
1977	The Singles As & Bs: Released: 1977; Label: Harvest (SHSM 2022); Format: LP, Cassette
1982	1967–1971: Released: 1982; Label See For Miles (CM 103); Format: Cassette, LP, CD
1984	Let Me Hear the Choir Sing: Released: 1984; Label: Edsel (ED 139); Format: LP
1985	Closed Restaurant Blues: Released: 1985; Label: Bam-Caruso (KIRI 032); Format: LP
1986	Cries From the Midnight Circus – The Best of 1968–1971: Released: 1986; Label: Harvest (EMS 1119); Format: LP
1990	Electric Banana: Released: 1990; Label: Repertoire (RR 4088-WZ); Format: CD
1990	More Electric Banana: Released: 1990; Label: Repertoire (RR 4089-WZ); Format: CD
1990	The Pretty Things Collection: Released: 1990; Label: Impact (IMCD 9.00986 O); Format: CD
1991	Greatest Hits: Released: 1991; Label: Carnaby (CD 552024); Format: CD, cassette
1992	Get a Buzz: The Best of the Fontana Years: Released: 1992; Label: Fontana (314 512 446-2); Formats: CD, cassette
1994	Midnight to 6: Released: 1994; Label: Spectrum (550 186-2); Format: CD, cassette
1995	Unrepentant – The Anthology: Released: 1995; Label: SPV (SPV 094-89692); Format: 2xCD
1997	The EP Collection... Plus: Released: 1997; Label: See For Miles (SEECD 476); Format: CD
1998	Greatest Hits: Released: 1998; Label: Universe (UN 3 122); Format: CD
2000	Latest Writs The Best Of... Greatest Hits: Released: 21 February 2000; Label: Snapper (SMACD823); Format: CD
2000	Midnight to Six Man: Released: 29 December 2000; Label: Norton (ED-284); Format: LP
2001	The Rhythm & Blues Years: Released: 20 July 2001; Label: Recall 2 cd (SMDCD343); Format: 2xCD
2001	The Psychedelic Years 1966–1970: Released: 29 October 2001; Label: Recall 2 cd (SMDCD344); Format: 2xCD
2002	Singles As & Bs: Released: 2002; Label: Repertoire (REP 4937); Format: 3xCD
2003	The Very Best of the Pretty Things: Released 2003; Label: Repertoire (REP 4990); Format: CD
2004	Still Unrepentant: Released 2004; Label: Snapper (SMADD888); Repertoire (REP 4937); Format: 2xCD/DVD
2004	Come See Me: The Very Best of the Pretty Things: Released: 20 April 2004; Label: Shout! Factory (DK 34132); Format: CD
2004	Midnight to Six Man: Released: 13 December 2004; Label: Magic (3 700139 304426); Format: 7xCD
2008	Singles '64-68: Released: 27 May 2008; Label: Sundazed (LP 5234); Format: 2xLP
2011	The Electric Banana Sessions: Released 2011; Label: Enigmatic (ENICD 08); Format: CD
2013	Introducing the Pretty Things: Released: 22 April 2013; Labels: Snapper, Recall 2 cd (SMDCD905); Format: 2xCD
2015	Bouquets From a Cloudy Sky: Released: 23 February 2015; Label: Snapper (SMABX1029); Format: 13xCD/2xDVD/10" vinyl
2017	The French EPs 1964-69: Released: 22 April 2017; Label: Madfish (SMACD1079); Formats: 5x7" vinyl
2017	Greatest Hits: Released: 13 October 2017; Label: Madfish (SMACD1082); Formats: 2xCD, 2xLP

== EPs ==
Release date	Title	Label	Chart positions	
Release date	Title	Label	UK	NL
December 1964	The Pretty Things	Fontana (TE 17434)	6	–
October 1965	Rainin' in My Heart	Fontana (TE 17442)	12	–
1965	Road Runner	Fontana (465 279 TE)	–	11
August 1966	The Pretty Things on Film	Fontana (TE 17472)	–	–
13 August 2012	SF Sorrow Live in London	Fruits De Mer (CRUSTACEAN 31)	–	–
2 January 2018	The Same Sun	Fruits De Mer (CRUSTACEAN 83)	–	–
21 April 2018	Live in Europe 1966-67	1960s (REP 016)	–	–
"—" denotes a release that did not chart.

== Singles ==
Release date	Title (A-side/B-side)	Label	Chart positions			
Release date	Title (A-side/B-side)	Label	UK	AU	CA	NL
8 May 1964	"Rosalyn" "Big Boss Man"	Fontana (TF 469)	41	67	–	–
16 October 1964	"Don't Bring Me Down" "We'll Be Together"	Fontana (TF 503)	10	65	34	–
12 February 1965	"Honey I Need" "I Can Never Say"	Fontana (TF 537)	13	54	–	–
March 1965	"Roadrunner" "Big City" (Netherlands)	Fontana (267 451 TF)	–	–	–	11
25 June 1965	"Cry to Me" "Get a Buzz"	Fontana (TF 585)	28	–	–	13
17 December 1965	"Midnight to Six Man" "Can't Stand The Pain"	Fontana (TF 647)	46	62	–	19
22 April 1966	"Come See Me" "£. s. d"	Fontana (TF 688)	43	92	–	36
1 July 1966	"A House in the Country" "Me Needing You"	Fontana (TF 722)	50	63	–	31
9 December 1966	"Progress" "Buzz the Jerk"	Fontana (TF 773)	55 (Note: Chart position is from the official UK "Breakers List".)	–	–	–
28 April 1967	"Children" "My Time"	Fontana (TF 829)	–	–	–	–
10 November 1967	"Defecting Grey" "Mr. Evasion"	Columbia (DB 8300)	–	–	–	–
4 December 1967	"Trippin'" "My Time"(Netherlands)	Fontana (267 786 TF)	–	–	–	–
February 1968	"Death of a Socialite" "Photographer" (Germany)	Star-Club (148 596 STF)	–	–	–	–
16 February 1968	"Talkin' About the Good Times" "Walking Through My Dreams"	Columbia (DB 8353)	–	–	–	–
1 November 1968	"Private Sorrow" "Balloon Burning"	Columbia (DB 8494)	–	–	–	–
1969	"Baron Saturday" "Loneliest Person" (France)	Columbia (2C 006-04.067 M)	–	–	–	–
17 April 1970	"The Good Mr. Square" "Blue Serge Blues"	Harvest (HAR 5016)	–	–	–	–
20 November 1970	"October 26" "Cold Stone"	Harvest (HAR 5031)	–	–	–	35
7 May 1971	"Stone-Hearted Mama" "Summertime" & "Circus Mind"	Harvest (HAR 5037)	–	–	–	–
8 December 1972	"Over the Moon" "Havana Bound"	Warner Bros. (K 16225)	–	–	–	–
6 December 1974	"Is It Only Love?" "Joey"	Swan Song (SSK 19401)	–	–	–	–
13 June 1975	"I'm Keeping..." "Atlanta"	Swan Song (SSK 19403)	–	–	–	–
25 July 1975	"Joey" "Bridge of God"	Swan Song (SSK 19404)	–	–	–	–
20 February 1976	"Sad Eye" "Remember That Boy"	Swan Song (SSK 19405)	–	–	–	–
28 May 1976	"Tonight" "It Isn't Rock 'n' Roll"	Swan Song (SSK 19406)	–	–	–	–
1978	"Do My Stuff" "Take Me Home" (as Electric Banana)	Rouge (RMS 1111)	–	–	–	–
1 August 1980	"I'm Calling" "Sea of Blue"	Warner Bros. (K 17670)	–	–	–	–
10 October 1980	"Falling Again" "She Don't"	Warner Bros. (K 17702)	–	–	–	–
1984	"Take Me Home" "James Marshall" (as Zac Zolar & Electric Banana)	Butt (Fun 5)	–	–	–	–
September 1989	"Eve of Destruction" "Goin' Downhill"	Trax (7TX 12)	–	–	–	–
1996	"Eve of Destruction" ”Rosalyn”/"Passion of Love"	Fragile (FRPS 006)	–	–	–	–
1999	"All Light Up" "Love Keeps Hanging On", "Goin' Downhill", & "Pretty Beat"	Madfish (121082)	–	–	–	–
June 2012	"Honey, I Need" (Live at the 100 Club, December 2010) "I Can Never Say" (Demo)	Fruits De Mer (CRUSTACEAN 29)	–	–	–	–
22 May 2020	"To Build a Wall" "The Devil Had a Hold of Me"	Madfish	–	–	–	–
"—" denotes a release that did not chart.

== Other releases ==
Year	Album details
2012	Parachute Reborn: Released: 30 April 2012; Label: Esoteric Antenna (EANTCD 100); Format: CD, 2-LP; Re-recording of Parachute by ex Pretty Things members Wally Waller, Jonathon Povey, Skip Alan, and Pete Tolson under the group name "xPTs"; Reissued on 2-LP by Renaissance Records under the title Parachute Revisited with one extra track 19 October 2021
