= Resurrection (The Pretty Things album) =

Live album by Pretty Things
- Released: January 26, 1999
- Recorded: September 6, 1998
- Studio: Abbey Road Studios, London
- Genre: Psychedelic rock
- Length: 59:23
- Label: Snapper
- Producer: Norman Smith

Pretty Things chronology
Out of the Island (1987)	Resurrection (1999)	... Rage Before Beauty (1999)

Professional ratings
Review scores
Source	Rating
Allmusic	3/5 stars

Resurrection is a live album by the English rock band Pretty Things. It is a complete performance of their 1968 rock opera S.F. Sorrow, recorded thirty years later at Abbey Road Studios.

== History ==
Resurrection was recorded on September 6, 1998, in Abbey Road Studio 2. The concert was performed in front of a small audience of family and friends and was broadcast live on the Internet. There were so many people attempting to watch the show online that the server crashed.

The Pretty Things line-up at that time included members who had recorded the original album in the same studio, except for Twink, who was replaced by long-time Pretty Things member Skip Alan (who had been with the group during the first half of the original album sessions). Mark St. John, the band's manager, and Dov Skipper, Skip Alan's son, provided percussion, while Frank Holland contributed guitar and vocals. Guest Arthur Brown narrated the interludes between the songs, which did not appear in the original album, and David Gilmour played lead guitar on five songs.

The concert was first released on CD in a limited edition in 1999, followed by a 2-CD edition with S.F. Sorrow in 2003. That same year, a DVD of the performance was released under the title S.F. Sorrow Live at Abbey Road.

== Track listing ==
No.	Title	Writer(s)	Length
1.	"Introduction"		1:47
2.	"Narration"		1:08
3.	"S.F. Sorrow Is Born"	Phil May, Dick Taylor, Wally Waller	3:10
4.	"Narration"		0:23
5.	"Bracelets of Fingers"	May, Taylor, Waller	3:48
6.	"Narration"		0:32
7.	"She Says Good Morning"	May, Taylor, Waller, Twink	4:35
8.	"Narration"		0:43
9.	"Private Sorrow"	May, Taylor, Waller, Jon Povey	3:36
10.	"Narration"		2:10
11.	"Balloon Burning"	May, Taylor, Waller, Povey	3:51
12.	"Narration"		0:06
13.	"Death"	May, Taylor, Waller, Povey, Twink	3:05
14.	"Narration"		0:30
15.	"Baron Saturday"	May, Taylor, Waller	4:20
16.	"Narration"		0:44
17.	"The Journey"	May, Taylor, Waller, Twink	2:42
18.	"Narration"		2:00
19.	"I See You"	May, Taylor, Waller	6:11
20.	"Well of Destiny"	May, Taylor, Waller, Povey, Twink, Norman Smith	3:00
21.	"Narration"		0:10
22.	"Trust"	May, Taylor, Waller	2:46
23.	"Narration"		0:19
24.	"Old Man Going"	May, Taylor, Waller, Povey, Twink	5:21
25.	"Narration"		0:09
26.	"Loneliest Person"	May, Taylor, Waller, Twink	1:40
27.	"Band Introductions / Applause"		0:38

== Personnel ==
=== Pretty Things ===
- Phil May – vocals
- Dick Taylor – guitar, vocals
- Jon Povey – keyboards, vocals
- Wally Waller – bass, vocals
- Skip Alan – drums
- Frank Holland – guitar, vocals

=== Guests ===
- Mark St. John – percussion
- Dov Skipper – percussion
- Arthur Brown – narration
- David Gilmour – guitar on "She Says Good Morning", "I See You", "Well of Destiny", "Trust" and "Old Man Going"
