= Freeway Madness =

Studio album by The Pretty Things
- Released: December 1972
- Studio: Morgan Studios, Willesden
- Genre: Rock
- Length: 37:50 (original release)
- Label: Warner Bros. K 46190
- Producer: Asa Jones

The Pretty Things chronology
Parachute (1970)	Freeway Madness (1972)	Silk Torpedo (1974)

Singles from Freeway Madness
- 1. "Over the Moon / Havana Bound" Released: December 8, 1972; 2. "Havana Bound / Religion's Dead" Released: October 12, 1994

Professional ratings
Review scores
Source	Rating
Allmusic	3/5 stars

Freeway Madness is the sixth album by the English rock band the Pretty Things. It was released in late 1972 on Warner Bros. Records and reissued by Warner Bros. imprint The Medicine Label in 1995 with additional liner notes from Phil May.

It is the second album without founding member Dick Taylor and the first without bassist Wally Waller as a full member, who had been with the band since the band's 1967 album Emotions. However, he did produce the album, as well as sing vocals on one of the tracks. Since he worked as a producer for EMI at the time, he appears on this album under the alias "Asa Jones".

== Track listing ==
All tracks are written by Phil May and Pete Tolson, except where noted.

Side one
No.	Title	Writer(s)	Length
1.	"Love Is Good"	May, Jon Povey	6:51
2.	"Havana Bound"		3:54
3.	"Peter"	Tolson	1:26
4.	"Rip Off Train"		3:17
5.	"Over the Moon"	May, Wally Waller	4:31

Side two
No.	Title	Length
6.	"Religion's Dead"	4:11
7.	"Country Road"	4:46
8.	"Allnight Sailor"	1:55
9.	"Onion Soup"	3:48
10.	"Another Bowl?"	2:50

Bonus tracks from 2002 CD reissue by Repertoire Records
No.	Title	Writer(s)	Length
11.	"Religion's Dead" (live at The Lyceum, London, Summer 1973)		4:46
12.	"Havana Bound" (live at The Lyceum, London, Summer 1973)		4:20
13.	"Love Is Good" (live at The Lyceum, London, Summer 1973)	May, Povey	6:43
14.	"Onion Soup" (live at The Lyceum, London, Summer 1973)		8:17
15.	"Over the Moon" (single edit)	May, Waller	4:06
16.	"Havana Bound" (single edit)		3:50

== Charts ==
Chart (1973)	Peak position
Australia (Kent Music Report)	51

== Personnel ==
=== The Pretty Things ===
- Phil May – lead vocals
- Pete Tolson – guitar
- Jon Povey – keyboards, vocals
- Stuart Brooks – bass guitar
- Skip Alan – drums

=== Additional musicians ===
- Gordon Huntley – pedal steel guitar on "Country Road"
- Wally Waller – vocals on "Over the Moon"
- Don Harper – viola
- Billy Reid – violin
- Johnny Van Derrick – violin
- Peter Willison – cello
