= The Pretty Things/Philippe DeBarge =

Studio album by The Pretty Things
- Released: 2009
- Recorded: September 1969; October 2008 (Track 13)
- Studios: Nova Studios, London, England
- Genres: Psychedelic pop; psychedelic rock
- Length: 45:22
- Label: UT Records
- Producer: Wally Waller

The Pretty Things chronology
Balboa Island (2007)	The Pretty Things/Philippe DeBarge (2009)	The Sweet Pretty Things (Are in Bed Now, of Course...) (2015)

Professional ratings
Review scores
Source	Rating
AllMusic	3/5 stars

The Pretty Things/Philippe DeBarge is an album by the English band The Pretty Things, with vocals by French millionaire playboy and rock singer manqué Philippe DeBarge (1940–1999). The album was recorded in September 1969 and released in 2009. In 2017, it was re-issued under the name Rock St. Trop with new cover art and two bonus tracks.

== Track listing ==
All tracks are written by Phil May and Wally Waller, except where noted.

No.	Title	Writer(s)	Length
1.	"Hello, How Do You Do?"		4:03
2.	"You Might Even Say"		3:59
3.	"Alexander"	May, Dick Taylor, Waller, Jon Povey	2:55
4.	"Send You with Loving"		3:00
5.	"You're Running You and Me"		4:36
6.	"Peace"		1:44
7.	"Eagle's Son"	May, Taylor, Waller, Povey	3:06
8.	"Graves of Grey"		0:48
9.	"New Day"		4:07
10.	"It'll Never Be Me"	May, Taylor, Waller, Povey, John C. Alder	4:32
11.	"I'm Checking Out"		3:40
12.	"All Gone Now"		2:19
13.	"Monsieur Rock (Ballad of Philippe)"		5:33
Total length:			44:22

2017 reissue bonus tracks
No.	Title	Length
14.	"Lover"
15.	"Silver Stars"

== Personnel ==
- Philippe DeBarge – lead vocals (tracks 1–12)
- Phil May – backing vocals (tracks 1–12), lead vocals (track 13 only)
- Vic Unitt – lead guitars, backing vocals (tracks 1–12)
- Dick Taylor – lead guitar (track 13 only)
- Wally Waller – bass, guitars, keyboards, percussion, backing vocals
- Jon Povey – keyboards, drums, percussion, backing vocals
- John C. Alder (a.k.a. Twink) – drums (tracks 2, 3, 4, 11)
- Skip Alan – drums (track 13 only)
