= Silk Torpedo =

Studio album by The Pretty Things
- Released: 1 November 1974
- Recorded: 1973
- Studio: Olympic Studios, London
- Genre: Rock
- Length: 42:02 (original release)
- Label: Swan Song
- Producer: Norman Smith

The Pretty Things chronology
Freeway Madness (1972)	Silk Torpedo (1974)	Savage Eye (1976)

Professional ratings
Review scores
Source	Rating
Allmusic	2/5 stars
Tom Hull	B−

Silk Torpedo is the seventh album by the English rock band The Pretty Things. This is their second album without Wally Waller, the group's rhythm guitarist/bassist since 1967. The album has more of a glam rock feel, a contrast from their early R&B years and their psychedelic years.

The album was the first to be released in the UK on the Swan Song Records label.

The album is the second rock opera by The Pretty Things, after S.F. Sorrow (1968), and follows the story of an unnamed protagonist throughout major points in his life. The band has not offered much explanation of the narrative, potentially leaving its meaning open to interpretation.

== Story ==
=== Life of the protagonist ===
One interpretation presents the album as a chronological account of a man’s life. The protagonist falls in love with a woman who leaves him to pursue her ambition of becoming a movie star. Heartbroken, he returns to Atlanta, depicted as a place of refuge, where he reflects on her departure with remorse: He concludes that love has disappointed him and wishes he had acted differently.

During his time in Atlanta, his father becomes gravely ill and dies — described metaphorically as “crossing the Bridge of God” — and his mother grows emotionally distant. Seeking to move forward, protagonist enlists in the navy and falls in love again. The song "Belfast Cowboys" describes bombings in Ireland, with lyrics referencing “khaki angels” (fighter planes), “mortar starlight,” and soldiers “fighting for a queen,” suggesting a World War II setting. The final track, "Bruise in the Sky," portrays the aftermath of the bombing and the emotional toll of the conflict.

=== Dream interpretation ===
Another interpretation holds that the album’s events occur entirely within a dream. The opening track, "Dream/Joey," introduces a dream narrative involving a character named Joey. The subsequent tracks may depict the protagonist’s own memories as they unfold in the dream, or alternatively, they may recount the life of Joey.

== Track listing ==
("Dream" and "Joey" are conjoined into a single song, as are "Belfast Cowboys" and "Bruise In The Sky".)

Side one
No.	Title	Writer(s)	Length
1.	"Dream"	Jon Povey	1:08
2.	"Joey"	Phil May	5:35
3.	"Maybe You Tried"	May, Pete Tolson	4:19
4.	"Atlanta"	May, Tolson	2:42
5.	"L.A.N.T.A."	May, Povey, Norman Smith	2:23
6.	"Is It Only Love"	May	5:04

Side two
No.	Title	Writer(s)	Length
1.	"Come Home Momma"	May	3:32
2.	"Bridge of God"	May	5:01
3.	"Singapore Silk Torpedo"	May, Tolson	5:11
4.	"Belfast Cowboys"	May, Povey	5:10
5.	"Bruise in the Sky"	Povey	1:50

Bonus tracks from 2002 CD reissue by Repertoire Records
No.	Title	Writer(s)	Length
11.	"Singapore Silk Torpedo" (live at Santa Monica Civic Auditorium, 1974)	May, Tolson	7:11
12.	"Dream / Joey" (live at Santa Monica Civic Auditorium, 1974)	May, Povey	7:16

== Personnel ==
The Pretty Things

- Phil May – lead vocals, percussion
- Pete Tolson – lead and acoustic guitars, bass
- Jon Povey – keyboards, backing vocals, harmonica, percussion
- Gordon John Edwards – bass, backing vocals, keyboards, guitar
- Skip Alan – drums, backing vocals, percussion

with:

- Jack Green – backing vocals
- Silver Band – brass on "Is It Only Love"

Technical

- Norman Smith – production
- Keith Harwood – engineer
- Hipgnosis – cover art
