= The Sweet Pretty Things (Are in Bed Now, of Course...) =

Studio album by Pretty Things
- Released: 10 July 2015
- Recorded: 811 Studios
- Genres: Rock and roll, blues, psychedelic rock
- Length: 36:48
- Label: Repertoire
- Producer: Mark St. John

Pretty Things chronology
Live at the 100 Club (2014)	The Sweet Pretty Things (Are in Bed Now, of Course...) (2015)	The Final Bow (2019)

The Sweet Pretty Things (Are in Bed Now, of Course...) is the twelfth studio album by the English rock band Pretty Things. It was released in 2015 via Repertoire Records.

It is the first album by longtime frontmen Phil May and Dick Taylor with their touring bassist George Woosey and drummer Jack Greenwood, and also their first without longtime keyboardist Jon Povey and drummer Skip Alan since 1965's Get the Picture?.

The title is taken from the opening line of Bob Dylan's song "Tombstone Blues".

The track "Turn My Head" was written by the band in the mid-1960s. A version was a recorded live at the BBC, but this album contains the first official studio version of the song.

== Track listing ==
No.	Title	Writer(s)	Length
1.	"The Same Sun"	Dick Taylor, Mark St. John	3:25
2.	"And I Do"	Phil May, George Woosey, St. John	3:34
3.	"Renaissance Fair" (The Byrds cover)	Jim McGuinn, David Crosby	1:54
4.	"You Took Me by Surprise" (The Seeds cover)	Sky Saxon	2:35
5.	"Dark Days"	May, Frank Holland	4:42
6.	"Turn My Head"	May, Taylor, Wally Waller	3:43
7.	"Greenwood Tree"	Taylor, Holland, Woosey, Jack Greenwood	4:18
8.	"Hell, Here and Nowhere"	Woosey	4:56
9.	"In the Soukh"	Taylor	2:32
10.	"Dirty Song"	May, Woosey	5:12

== Personnel ==
Pretty Things

- Phil May – lead vocals, maracas
- Dick Taylor – lead guitar, vocals
- Frank Holland – guitars, lead guitar on "And I Do," Mellotron, vocals
- George Woosey – bass, guitars, vocals
- Jack Greenwood – drums, percussion, vocals

Additional musicians

- Mark St. John – vocals, percussion, engineer
- Nick Brockway – Hammond organ
