= Parachute (The Pretty Things album) =

Studio album by The Pretty Things
- Released: June 1970
- Recorded: September 1969 – April 1970
- Studios: Abbey Road Studios, London
- Genres: Progressive rock; psychedelic rock; psychedelic pop; hard rock
- Length: 40:58
- Label: Harvest
- Producer: Norman Smith

The Pretty Things chronology
S. F. Sorrow (1968)	Parachute (1970)	Freeway Madness (1972)

Parachute is the fifth studio album by the English rock band The Pretty Things, released in 1970. It is their first album without guitarist Dick Taylor.

== Background ==
The Pretty Things released what is commonly recognized as the first rock opera, S. F. Sorrow, in December 1968. While it has come to be considered a cult classic, it failed to chart in any country at the time. They continued to provide soundtrack work under the pseudonym Electric Banana to help pay off debts and played live shows in England as often as they could, although most of the songs from S. F. Sorrow could not be performed live due to the use of heavy studio overdubs. Disillusioned by the group's lack of success, founding member and lead guitarist Dick Taylor quit in June 1969, to be replaced by Vic Unitt from the Edgar Broughton Band. In September, the band became involved in recording an album with French playboy Philippe DeBarge, with the group writing and performing all the songs upon which DeBarge added his lead vocals. The album only circulated as an acetate around Philippe's social circle, however, and did not see official release until 2009. Shortly after the sessions, drummer Twink also quit to form his own band, the Pink Fairies; fortunately, the band's previous drummer Skip Alan (who had quit midway through the sessions for S. F. Sorrow) accepted an invitation back. With the lineup of the band again stable, they returned to EMI (now Abbey Road) studios in London to record their next album.

== Songs and recording ==
Parachute was recorded between the fall of 1969 and the spring of 1970 with engineer Norman Smith (The Beatles, Pink Floyd) again handling production. The majority of the songs were penned by Wally Waller and Phil May, although as they had just recently finished the DeBarge project, their catalog of new songs was depleted, necessitating a few weeks prior to entering the studio to craft new songs. Both Waller and May later claimed that recording S. F. Sorrow had freed the group from the limitations of pop, with its follow-up also carrying a more conceptual tone, although this time without an overt storyline. According to Waller, "We noticed that the songs were either about city life or the opposite, escape from the city to the country. We both felt that the 60s had burned a lot of people out. Anecdotally at least we felt that a lot of people were getting places out of town to chill out." As a result, the album was thematically divided into "urban" and "rural" sides, with several multi-part suites on side one leaning in the direction of progressive rock. The key song in the opening suite, "The Good Mr. Square", was taken from a May short story about a hermit who lives in an isolated small apartment in the city.

While the overall style was still psychedelic, the group were more mindful this time of being able to perform the material live and came up with some of their hardest rocking songs to date, including "Cries From The Midnight Circus" and "Sickle Clowns." Meanwhile, some of the more pastoral material like "In The Square" and "Grass" was drenched in harpsichords, mellotrons and soft harmony vocals.

== Title and artwork ==
According to Waller, the album title was thought of by May:

"Out of the blue one day, Phil said to me 'Why don't we call it Parachute?' He went on to explain his logic. A parachute is a kind of escape mechanism, but there’s no guarantee that it’s going to work. It’s the last resort when you jump out of a stricken aircraft and pull the rip-cord, you can never be sure the chute will open properly, in which case it would be an unmitigated disaster. The same could be said of a city girl or boy escaping to the countryside or vice versa. In the end I agreed – we weren't offering any solutions, just posing the dilemma – it may seem like a possible escape route but maybe it won't be, maybe it will all end in tears!"

The artwork for Parachute was designed by Hipgnosis and released as a gatefold, with the front cover depicting a lone highway at night with a tall brick chimney on one side and a huge overgrown flower on the other, with a glowing child standing in the middle of the road with its palm stretched out to the viewer. The inside of the gatefold featured a black-and-white group portrait with the lyrics printed over it.

== Release and reception ==
Professional ratings
Review scores
Source	Rating
Allmusic	3.5/5 stars
Record Collector	5/5 stars

Parachute was released as Harvest SHVL 774 in June 1970 and soon peaked at number 43 on the UK charts, an improvement over its predecessor. Reviews at the time of release were very positive, with Billboard calling it "another top-flight album" for the band. In the UK, Record Mirror wrote that it was a "brilliant instrumental blending acoustic instruments with thundering beat and wild spacious harmonies", concluding it was "the best they've ever done." In 1975, Rolling Stone critic Steve Turner wrote that it had been "a Rolling Stone 'album of the year'," though in fact Parachute did not place among the magazine's Albums of the Year for 1970 or 1971, and indeed was not mentioned in Rolling Stone until Stephen Holden called it an "obscure underground classic" in his review of Freeway Madness. Retrospectively, Jack Rabid at AllMusic compared it to Abbey Road, noting "the creative neurons are still firing throughout a multi-varied, cohesive LP. This time the topic is a generation caught between the conflicting calls of (rural) peace, love, and boredom, and (urban) sophistication, sex, and squalor in a harsh world."

In 1975, the record was packaged as a double LP with S. F. Sorrow titled S. F. Sorrow and Parachute and issued on the UK label Harvest on the Harvest Heritage series. In 1976, the record was again packaged as a double LP with S. F. Sorrow titled Real Pretty. In Canada, the album was released on Motown Records.

In 2000, a CD reissue of the album on Snapper Music contained bonus tracks of non-LP single sides released in the year after the album's release that featured new guitarist Pete Tolson in place of Unitt. In September 2010, Snapper released a 40th anniversary double CD which included bonus acoustic reworkings of various tracks recorded in May 2010 by Wally Waller and Phil May.

== Track listing ==
All songs by Phil May and Wally Waller, except where noted. Adapted from original UK pressing.

Side A
No.	Title	Length
1.	"Scene One": "Scene One"; "The Good Mr. Square"; "She Was Tall, She Was High"	4:54 1:51 1:27 1:36
2.	"In the Square / The Letter / Rain"	6:03 1:55 1:39 2:29
3.	"Miss Fay Regrets"	3:28
4.	"Cries from the Midnight Circus"	6:28

Side B
No.	Title	Writer(s)	Length
1.	"Grass"		4:20
2.	"Sickle Clowns"		6:36
3.	"She's a Lover"		3:32
4.	"What's the Use"		1:45
5.	"Parachute"	May, Norman Smith	3:52
Total length:			40:58

- Many subsequent pressings of the album separated the medleys on side A into three tracks each.

=== Bonus tracks on 2000 reissue ===
1. "Blue Serge Blues" (May, Waller, Jon Povey) – 3:55
2. "October 26" – 4:57
3. "Cold Stone" (May, Waller, Pete Tolson) – 3:11
4. "Stone–Hearted Mama" – 3:29
5. "Summer Time" (May, Waller, Tolson) – 4:29
6. "Circus Mind" (May, Tolson) – 2:00

== Personnel ==
The Pretty Things

- Phil May – vocals
- Vic Unitt – guitars [album tracks only]
- Wally Waller – bass, guitar, vocals
- Jon Povey – keyboards, vocals
- Skip Alan – drums
- Pete Tolson – guitars [bonus tracks only]

Technical

- Tony Clark – engineer
- Nick Webb – assistant engineer
- Hipgnosis – cover design, photography
