= Balboa Island (album) =

Studio album by Pretty Things
- Released: May 2007
- Recorded: 2005–2006
- Studio: Côte Basque Studios
- Genre: Rock and roll, blues
- Length: 57:53
- Label: Zoho Roots
- Producer: Mark St. John

Pretty Things chronology
... Rage Before Beauty (1999)	Balboa Island (2007)	The Pretty Things/Philippe DeBarge (2009)

Balboa Island is the eleventh studio album by the English rock band Pretty Things, released on Zoho Roots in 2007.

== Reception ==
Professional ratings
Review scores
Source	Rating
AllMusic	3.5/5 stars
Record Collector	5/5 stars

Although reviews from AllMusic and PopMatters were generally favorable, criticism was made of the length of "(Blues for) Robert Johnson" and the band's cover of Bob Dylan's "The Ballad of Hollis Brown".

== Track listing ==
1. "The Beat Goes On" (Phil May, Frank Holland, Mark St. John) – 4:14
2. "Livin' in My Skin" (May, Holland) – 3:56
3. "Buried Alive" (May, Holland) – 3:36
4. "(Blues for) Robert Johnson" (May, Holland) – 8:00
5. "Mimi" (Dick Taylor) – 2:35
6. "Pretty Beat" (May, Taylor, Holland, St. John) – 2:52
7. "The Ballad of Hollis Brown" (Bob Dylan) – 6:30
8. "In the Beginning" (May, Holland) – 4:42
9. "Feel Like Goin' Home" (Muddy Waters; arranged by the Pretty Things) – 2:39
10. "Freedom Song" (Traditional; arranged by the Pretty Things) – 4:46
11. "Dearly Beloved" (May, Jon Povey) – 5:00
12. "All Light Up" (May, Holland, St. John) – 4:30
13. "Balboa Island" (Holland) – 4:42

== Personnel ==
Pretty Things

- Phil May – vocals
- Dick Taylor – lead guitars
- Frank Holland – guitars, vocals
- Wally Waller – bass, guitars, vocals
- Jon Povey – keyboards, vocals
- Skip Alan – drums, percussion

Studio musicians

- Mark St. John – ancient Trixon drums, vocals
- Scarlett Wrench – additional vocals
- James Cheetham – piano, organ on "(Blues for) Robert Johnson"
- Rupert Cobb – trumpet
- Duncan Taylor-Jones – extra vocals on "Dearly Beloved"
