= Savage Eye =

Studio album by Pretty Things
- Released: January 1976
- Studio: Olympic Studios, London
- Genre: Rock
- Length: 39:04 (original release)
- Label: Swan Song
- Producer: Norman Smith

Pretty Things chronology
Silk Torpedo (1974)	Savage Eye (1976)	Cross Talk (1980)

Singles from Savage Eye
- 1. "I'm Keeping… / Atlanta" Released: 13 June 1975; 2. "Sad Eye / Remember That Boy" Released: 20 February 1976

Savage Eye is an album by the English rock band Pretty Things. Their eighth album, it was released in 1975 by Swan Song Records. It was their second and last album on Led Zeppelin's Swan Song Records. The band broke up later the same year after the departure of lead singer Phil May.

== Track listing ==
Side one
No.	Title	Writer(s)	Length
1.	"Under the Volcano"	Phil May, Pete Tolson	6:02
2.	"My Song"	May	5:12
3.	"Sad Eye"	Tolson	4:31
4.	"Remember That Boy"	May	5:04

Side two
No.	Title	Writer(s)	Length
5.	"It Isn't Rock 'n' Roll"	Jon Povey	4:07
6.	"I'm Keeping"	May	4:04
7.	"It's Been So Long"	May	5:07
8.	"Drowned Man"	May, Povey	4:23
9.	"Theme for Michelle" (instrumental)	Povey	1:59

Bonus tracks from 2002 CD reissue by Repertoire Records
No.	Title	Writer(s)	Length
10.	"Tonight" (A-side)	Gordon Edwards	3:05
11.	"Love Me a Little" (demo)		3:10
12.	"Dance All Night" (demo)		2:53

== Personnel ==
The Pretty Things

- Phil May – vocals
- Pete Tolson – lead guitar, rhythm guitar, acoustic guitar, bass
- Jon Povey – electric keyboards, harpsichord, vocals
- Skip Alan – drums
- Gordon John Edwards – keyboards, guitars, vocals
- Jack Green – bass, acoustic guitar, vocals

Technical

- Norman Smith – producer, saxophone
- Keith Harwood – engineer
