= Bare as Bone, Bright as Blood =

Studio album by Pretty Things
- Released: 25 September 2020
- Studio: 811 Studios, Horsham
- Genre: Blues
- Label: Madfish
- Producer: Mark St. John

Pretty Things chronology
The Final Bow (2019)	Bare as Bone, Bright as Blood (2020)

Bare as Bone, Bright as Blood is the thirteenth and final studio album by the English rock band Pretty Things. It was released in September 2020, a few months after the death of lead singer Phil May.

Professional ratings
Review scores
Source	Rating
Classic Rock	7/10 stars
Uncut	8/10 stars

== Track listing ==
No.	Title	Writer(s)	Length
1.	"Can't Be Satisfied"	McKinley Morganfield	3:04
2.	"Come into My Kitchen"	Robert Johnson; arranged by Dick Taylor and Phil May	4:17
3.	"Ain't No Grave"	Claude Ely	3:58
4.	"Faultline"	Peter Hayes, Robert Levon Been	4:22
5.	"Redemption Day"	Sheryl Crow	5:22
6.	"The Devil Had a Hold on Me"	Gillian Welch, David Rawlings	4:16
7.	"Bright as Blood"	George Woosey	4:44
8.	"Love in Vain"	Robert Johnson	4:17
9.	"Black Girl"	Traditional; arranged by Dick Taylor and Phil May	2:37
10.	"To Build a Wall"	Will Varley	4:25
11.	"Another World"	Pete Harlen	3:56
12.	"I'm Ready"	Willie Dixon	3:43

== Personnel ==
The Pretty Things

- Phil May – lead vocals
- Dick Taylor – lead guitar, acoustic guitar, slide guitar, extra guitars

with:

- George Woosey – acoustic guitar
- Henry Padovani – acoustic guitar, lead guitar
- Sam Brothers – acoustic guitar, lead guitar, banjo, harmonica, sundry guitar
- Jon Wigg – violin
- Mark St. John – percussion

Technical

- Mark St. John – producer, engineer, mixing, cover design, cover concept, band photographs
- Frederick Jude – executive producer
- Gwyn Mathias – mastering
- Beech – artwork, layout, cover design, cover concept
- Judy Totton – band photographs
