= Think Pink =

Debut studio album by Twink

Studio album by Twink
- Released: December 1970 (US); 1971 (UK)
- Recorded: July 1969, Sounds Studio, London
- Genre: Psychedelic rock
- Length: 37:37
- Label: Polydor (UK); Sire (US); Akarma (Italy) (1999 reissue)
- Producer: Mick Farren

Twink chronology
Think Pink (1970)	Mr. Rainbow (1990)

Professional ratings
Review scores
Source	Rating
Allmusic	4/5 stars
Record Mirror	1/5 stars

Think Pink is the debut album by English psychedelic musician Twink. Recorded in 1969, the album was released on Sire Records in the US in 1970 and Polydor Records in the UK in early 1971 (as a warm-up for the release of the Pink Fairies' debut effort Never Never Land). It was produced by Mick Farren and featured members of The Pretty Things, The Deviants, plus Steve Peregrin Took of Tyrannosaurus Rex. The final two tracks were the only commercial release of any songs written by Took until 1990, ten years after his death.

The track "Fluid" was sampled by Gnarls Barkley on their track "Would Be Killer" from the hit album The Odd Couple and Tyler, the Creator on the track “Boyfriend” from the physical release of his album Igor.

== Track listing ==
All songs written by Twink, except where noted.

Side one

1. "The Coming of the Other One" – 3:39
2. "Ten Thousand Words in a Cardboard Box" (Twink, Junior) – 4:29
3. "Dawn of Magic" – 1:44
4. "Tiptoe on the Highest Hill" – 5:18
5. "Fluid" – 4:03

Side two

1. "Mexican Grass War" – 5:28
2. "Rock an' Roll the Joint" – 2:29
3. "Suicide" – 4:23
4. "Three Little Piggies" (Steve Took, Twink) – 3:12
5. "The Sparrow Is a Sign" (Took, Twink) – 2:22

== Personnel ==
- Twink – vocals; drums (tracks #1–2, 4–5, 7–10); acoustic guitar (track #8)
- Wally Allen – piano (#5)
- Mick Farren – vocals (#7); producer
- Dave "Boss" Goodman – vocals, percussion (#9)
- John "Honk" Lodge – bass guitar (#5, 7)
- John Povey – sitar (#1), mellotron (#2, 4, 8)
- Viv Prince – drums (#6)
- Paul Rudolph – acoustic & electric guitars (#2, 4–8, 10); vibraphone (#8); vocals (#9); percussion (#9); bass guitar (#10); chimes (#10)
- Silver – vocals (#5, 7, 9); percussion (#9)
- Steve Peregrin Took – pixie horn (#1); vocals (#1,9,10); percussion (#6, 7, 9); acoustic guitar (#10)
- Victor Unitt – electric guitars (#5, 7)
- John "Junior" Wood – bass guitar (#2, 4, 8)
