= Cross Talk =

Studio album by Pretty Things
- Released: August 1980
- Recorded: 1979
- Studio: Matrix Studios, London
- Genre: Rock; new wave
- Length: 36:15 (original release) 46:47 (CD reissue)
- Label: Warner Bros. Records
- Producer: Jon Astley, Phil Chapman

Pretty Things chronology
Savage Eye (1976)	Cross Talk (1980)	Live at Heartbreak Hotel (1984)

Professional ratings
Review scores
Source	Rating
Allmusic	3/5 stars

Cross Talk, released in 1980, is the ninth studio album by the English rock band Pretty Things.

== Track listing ==
1. "I'm Calling" (Phil May, Pete Tolson) – 4:06
2. "Edge of the Night" (May, Wally Waller) – 3:19
3. "Sea of Blue" (May, Tolson) – 3:13
4. "Lost That Girl" (May) – 2:50
5. "Bitter End" (May, Jon Povey) – 3:16
6. "Office Love" (May, Tolson) – 4:12
7. "Falling Again" (May, Waller) – 3:20
8. "It's So Hard" (May, Tolson) – 3:14
9. "She Don't" (Tolson, May) – 4:08
10. "No Future" (May, Tolson) – 4:28

=== Bonus tracks on 2000 reissue ===
1. "Wish Fulfillment" (May, Tolson) – 3:05
2. "Sea About Me" (May, Waller) – 3:22
3. "The Young Pretenders" (May, Povey) – 4:05

== Personnel ==
Pretty Things

- Phil May – vocals
- Dick Taylor – guitar
- Pete Tolson – lead guitar
- Wally Waller – bass, guitars, vocals
- Jon Povey – keyboards, vocals
- Skip Alan – drums

with:

- Willy Wilson – drums on "I'm Calling" and "Falling Again"
- Richard Whaley, Simon Smart – engineer
