= ... Rage Before Beauty =

Studio album by Pretty Things
- Released: 9 March 1999
- Recorded: 1998–99
- Studio: 145 Wardour Street, Soho, London
- Genre: Rock
- Length: 64:27
- Label: Snapper Music
- Producer: Mark St. John, Dave Garland

Pretty Things chronology
Resurrection (1999)	... Rage Before Beauty (1999)	Balboa Island (2007)

Professional ratings
Review scores
Source	Rating
AllMusic	2/5 stars
The Encyclopedia of Popular Music	3/5 stars
Rolling Stone	3.5/5 stars
The San Diego Union-Tribune	3/4 stars

... Rage Before Beauty is a studio album by the English rock band Pretty Things, released in 1999.

== Production ==
Ronnie Spector provided backing vocals on the band's cover of "Mony Mony". David Gilmour guested on "Love Keeps Hanging On". The album was produced by Mark St. John and Dave Garland. ... Rage Before Beauty was recorded by the 1966 lineup of the band.

== Critical reception ==
Perfect Sound Forever called the album "a testament to the brand of sweaty, guitar-driven, R&B garage rock which never really seems to go out of fashion." The Boston Globe wrote that "vocalist Phil May's gravelly voice is stupefying on the Pretty's cover of 'Play With Fire', virtually besting Mick Jagger's own icy interpretation." The Orange County Register thought that "from the rollicking 'Passion of Love' to anthemic, reflective ballads like 'Love Keeps Hanging On' ... the album is a summation of almost every style the Pretties ever attempted, while still retaining some middle-age maturity."

Record Collector deemed it one of the band's "best ever recordings."

== Track listing ==
1. "Passion of Love" (Phil May, Mark St. John) – 3:22
2. "Vivian Prince" (May, Frank Holland, Jon Povey) – 5:15
3. "Everlasting Flame" (May, Holland, St. John) – 3:46
4. "Love Keeps Hanging On" (May) – 8:55
5. "Eve of Destruction" (P. F. Sloan) – 3:03
6. "Not Givin' In" (May) – 4:02
7. "Pure Cold Stone" (May, Dick Taylor) – 5:47
8. "Blue Turns to Red" (May, Holland) – 4:01
9. "Goodbye, Goodbye" (May, Povey) – 2:45
10. "Goin' Downhill" (May, Pete Tolson) – 4:12
11. "Play with Fire" (Nanker Phelge) – 4:07
12. "Fly Away" (May) – 4:30
13. "Mony, Mony" (Tommy James, Bo Gentry, Ritchie Cordell, Bobby Bloom) – 4:45
14. "God, Give Me the Strength (To Carry On)" (May, St. John) – 6:03

== Personnel ==
Pretty Things

- Phil May – vocals, acoustic guitar, harmonica
- Dick Taylor – lead guitar, acoustic guitar
- Frank Holland – lead guitar, acoustic guitar, vocals
- Wally Waller – bass, acoustic guitar, vocals
- Jon Povey – keyboards, vocals
- Skip Alan – drums, percussion

Studio musicians

- Mark St. John – drums
- Nick Brockway – Hammond organ
- Steve Browning
- Robert Webb – keyboards
- Nigel Ross-Scott – bass
- David Gilmour – lead guitar on "Love Keeps Hangin' On"
- Ronnie Spector – vocals on "Mony Mony"
