= Frederick Cuming =

British landscape painter (1930–2022)

Frederick Cuming RA
- Born: 16 February 1930; London, England
- Died: 12 June 2022 (aged 92); Iden, East Sussex, England
- Education: Sidcup School of Art (1945–49); Royal College of Art (1951–55)
- Known for: Landscape painting
- Elected: ARA (1969), RA (1974); NEAC (1960); HonRBA; HonROI
- Website: fredcuming.com

Stormy Weather and Kite by Fred Cuming

Frederick George Rees Cuming RA (February 16, 1930 – 12 June, 2022), normally known as Fred Cuming, was a contemporary British landscape painter, who worked in a traditional manner.

== Life and art ==
Cuming was born in London of English, Scottish and Irish ancestry. He received his art education at Sidcup School of Art (1945–49) and, after National Service, at the Royal College of Art. He was awarded the Abbey Minor Travelling Scholarship to visit Italy. In 1957 his oil painting of Lewisham Road was included as one of the 'Young Artists of Promise' in Jack Beddington's book. In 1969, he was elected an Associate of the Royal Academy (ARA), and a Royal Academician (RA) in 1974. He was elected as a member of the New English Art Club in 1960.

As well as continuing to paint Italian scenes, including Venice, he still devoted much time to the landscape of the Southern English coastline, including Hastings and Rye. His art has an impressionist quality which captures "the fleeting impressions of his surroundings". He first encountered such landscapes as a child evacuee during the Blitz. The powerful contrast to his home in London created an enduring love for it.

He lived in Rye, near Ashford, Kent until his death in June 2022.

Ferry to Polryn by Fred Cuming

In a review for the BBC, Andrew Walker said:

Fred Cuming's haunting, vaguely Turneresque, painting, Ferry to Polrwen, combines great subtlety, especially in his skilful representation of a lowering sky, with an end-of-era feel, strongly redolent of Turner's own masterpiece, the Fighting Temeraire.

== Awards ==
His awards included:

- 1977 Joint winner of Grand Prix Fine Art, Monte Carlo
- 1986 Sir Brinsley Ford Award, New English Club
- 1988 Grand Prix de l'Art Contemporaries
- 1994 House and Garden Award

== Collections ==
His work is in many collections including the Royal Academy, Ministry of Works, Maidstone Museum, Carlisle Museum, Worcester College, Oxford, London Tourist Board, National Trust Foundation for Art, Department of the Environment, Brighton and Hove Museum, National Museum of Wales, Cardiff, Bradford Museum, New Metropole Arts Centre, Folkestone, Monte Carlo Museum, St John's College, Oxford, Lloyd's of London, London Weekend Television and the Guinness Collection.

== See also ==
- Federation of British Artists
