= Cecil Ross Burnett =

British painter

- Born: 27 April 1872; Charlton, Kent, England
- Died: 6 December 1933 (aged 61); Blackheath, London, England
- Occupation: Painter

Cecil Ross Burnett (27 April 1872 – 6 December 1933) was a British landscape artist and portraitist. He signed his work "C. Ross Burnett".

== Early life and education ==
Burnett was born in Old Charlton, Kent; his father, William Charles Burnett, was a banker. He trained at Blackheath School of Art and the Westminster School of Art before entering the Royal Academy School in 1892. In 1895 he won the Turner gold medal and a scholarship for landscape painting, and a silver medal for a portrait from life.

== Career ==
He specialised in portraits and in mostly rural landscapes, many created near Amberley, Sussex, where he had a cottage. He worked in oil and watercolour, and was a member of the New Society of Painters in Water-Colours from 1910 and of the Langham Sketching Club and the Pencil Society.

Burnett exhibited at the Royal Academy and elsewhere. He entered works in the art competitions at the 1928 Summer Olympics and the 1932 Summer Olympics.

In 1898 he founded the Sidcup School of Art; he was its principal for many years.

== Personal life and death ==
In 1903 Burnett married Alice Theresa Allenberg, from South Africa; they had a son and a daughter and lived in Blackheath, London, where he died on 6 December 1933.
