= Emotions (The Pretty Things album) =

Studio album by The Pretty Things
- Released: April 1967
- Studio: Philips (London)
- Genre: Psychedelia
- Length: 32:14 (original); 63:07 (2001 reissue on Repertoire)
- Labels: Fontana (UK); Star Club (Germany)
- Producer: Steve Rowland

The Pretty Things chronology
Get the Picture? (1965)	Emotions (1967)	S.F. Sorrow (1968)

Professional ratings
Review scores
Source	Rating
AllMusic	4/5 stars

Emotions is the third album by the English rock group The Pretty Things, released in 1967.

== Recording ==
The sessions for Emotions were spread across a few months during which there were major changes in the band's line up. Their record company Fontana had not been happy with how their three 1966 singles "Midnight to Six Man", "Come See Me" and "A House in the Country" had sold. For the latter single, Fontana assigned them producer Steve Rowland who was producing hits for Dave Dee, Dozy, Beaky, Mick & Tich hoping that Rowland would help the band regain a commercial sound to improve sales. The band were not pleased by this intervention and were keen to leave Fontana, so they simply went along with Fontana's demands to fulfil the contract which included a third album.

Sessions for Emotions began towards the end of 1966. The first result, "Progress" was released as a single in December 1966. This featured the band with a brass section, and, though commercial, it failed to sell. Brian Pendleton was unhappy with the direction the band was heading in, and, with money being rather short, he quit the band that Christmas. A month later, bassist John Stax, similarly unhappy, also quit the band. Frontman Phil May called upon a childhood friend Wally Waller, whose band, the Fenmen, had recently split, to help record the rest of the album. Waller took over the bass duties and brought in the Fenmen's drummer, Jon Povey, who was also a keyboardist. Waller and Povey were huge Beach Boys fans and between them had developed their own distinctive harmonies which when paired with May's vocals gave the Pretty Things a new dimension.

The style of Emotions showed a fusion of "hard blues [and] psychedelia". Steve Rowland decided the new songs sounded rather empty so he enlisted arranger Reg Tilsley to write and conduct orchestral arrangements for most of the tracks. Again, the band were not pleased by this but to appease Fontana and be able to break free, they went along with the idea. Tilsley was given tapes of demos and work in progress of the songs and wrote the arrangements. Some were fairly simple, requiring a brass section, whilst others were more elaborate, bringing in strings.

Whilst some of these arrangements were overdubbed on what had already been recorded, Dick Taylor has recalled there were a couple of sessions where the band and Tilsley's ensemble were together in the studio. Because the songs had mostly already been written, the new members Waller and Povey weren't able to contribute much to the writing nor add their harmonies to most of the album. The new harmonies did make an appearance on "Children" which was chosen to be the single released in May 1967 on Fontana TF 829. The harmonies also appeared on "Out in the Night", "Bright Lights of the City" and "My Time" where they were used in a more sparing, ethereal manner.

Outside the studio, the band's live sound had changed drastically as they became involved in the burgeoning psychedelic scene. By the time Emotions was released, the contrast between the band on the record and on stage was enormous. The band were not happy with the end result and did nothing to promote it. Once released, their obligations to Fontana had been fulfilled and they were free to seek a new record contract.

== After release ==
None of the songs from Emotions were played live preceding or following its release by the band. They simply ignored the album, but around the time of the single release of "Children" they did play the song live onstage in Paris which was broadcast live on French TV.

It would not be until the mid to late 1990s that the Pretty Things resurrected "Growing In My Mind" for occasional airings in live shows since that was the one song Phil May admitted liking and didn't feel embarrassed by. When the album was remastered for the Snapper CD, manager Mark St. John went back to the original three-track tapes to remix "There Will Never Be Another Day", "The Sun", "Photographer" and "My Time" as well as preceding single "Progress" minus Reg Tilsley's embellishments. These were presented as bonus tracks on the remastered CD.

In December 2009, Wally Waller and Jon Povey released Sunstroke, a CD of rare unissued recordings from their days in the Fenmen. To fill in the CD, under the name of the Bexley Brothers, they recorded 8 new songs with a couple of guest appearances from Dick Taylor. Amongst them was a brand new recording of "The Sun" with Povey taking the lead vocal.

== Track listing ==
Side one

1. "Death of a Socialite" (Ian Stirling, Phil May, Dick Taylor) – 2:44
2. "Children" (Wally Waller, May, Taylor) – 3:05
3. "The Sun" (May, Waller) – 3:06
4. "There Will Never Be Another Day" (Taylor, May, Waller) – 2:22
5. "House of Ten" (Waller, May, Taylor) – 2:54
6. "Out in the Night" (Stirling, Taylor) – 2:44

Side two

1. "One Long Glance" (Waller, May, Taylor) – 2:54
2. "Growing in My Mind" (May, Taylor) – 2:21
3. "Photographer" (May, Stirling, Taylor) – 2:07
4. "Bright Lights of the City" (Waller, May) – 3:02
5. "Tripping" (May, Taylor) – 3:26
6. "My Time" (Taylor, May, Waller) – 3:09

Bonus tracks

1. "A House in the Country" (Ray Davies) – 3:00
2. "Progress" (Bob Halley, Carl Spencer) – 2:42
3. "Photographer" (May, Stirling, Taylor) – 2:14
4. "There Will Never Be Another Day" (Taylor, May, Waller) – 2:25
5. "My Time" (Taylor, May, Waller) – 3:11
6. "The Sun" (May, Waller) – 3:09
7. "Progress" (Bob Halley, Carl Spencer) – 2:57

== Personnel ==
The Pretty Things

- Phil May – vocals
- Dick Taylor – guitar
- Skip Alan – drums
- Jon Povey – keyboards, vocals
- Wally Waller – bass, guitars, vocals
- Brian Pendleton – rhythm guitar
- John Stax – bass

with:

- Johnnie Gray – alto, tenor and soprano saxophone
- J. Collier – double bass
- G. Wallace – bass trombone
- John Shinebourne, Lionel Ross, R. Kok, William de Mont – cello
- Reg Tilsley – orchestra conductor
- Marie Goossens – harp
- Keith Christie – trombone
- Albert Hall, Bert Ezzard, Greg Bowen – trumpet
- Johnny Edwards – valve trombone

Note – Brian Pendleton and John Stax were present when sessions began for the album, but it is still unknown precisely on which tracks they played.
