= Sidcup Art College =

Defunct art college in Greater London, England

Coordinates: 51.4249°N 0.1026°E

Sidcup Art College, also known as Sidcup School of Art, was an art college in Grassington Road, Sidcup, Greater London, England. Founded in 1898, it amalgamated in 1962 with Bromley College of Art and Beckenham School of Art to form Ravensbourne College of Art and Design, now Ravensbourne University London.

== History ==
Cecil Ross Burnett founded Sidcup School of Art in 1898 and was its first headmaster. By 1952 it was located in Grassington Road.

In 1962, by then known as Sidcup Art College, the institution amalgamated with Bromley College of Art and Beckenham School of Art to form Ravensbourne College of Art and Design, which in 1965 consolidated in a new building at Bromley Common. The Sidcup building was demolished and the site is now occupied by a Morrisons supermarket which opened in 2003.

=== Musical heritage ===
Many rock musicians came out of British art colleges in the 1960s. Keith Richards was at Sidcup Art College from 1959, and described it as "a kind of guitar workshop" where classes were focused on teaching graphic design for advertising; while there he became reacquainted with his primary-school friend Mick Jagger, then a student at the London School of Economics, and they formed what became the Rolling Stones. An early line-up of the Stones, including Jagger, Richards, Brian Jones, Ian Stewart, Ricky Fenson and Tony Chapman, played at the college Christmas dance on 12 December 1962. The Pretty Things, one of Britain's early R&B bands, was also formed at the college in September 1963; Phil May as well as Dick Taylor, a former bassist with the Rolling Stones, were students there.

== Notable students ==
- Jean Clark, painter
- Fred Cuming, painter
- Wally Fawkes, cartoonist (Trog) and jazz musician
- William Green, painter
- Phil May, The Pretty Things
- Keith Richards, The Rolling Stones
- Dick Taylor, The Rolling Stones, The Pretty Things
- Margaret Thomas, painter
- John Titchell, painter

== Notable faculty ==
- Frank Auerbach, painter, met one of his long-standing subjects, Julia Yardly Mills, when he taught her at Sidcup School of Art
- Ralph Beyer, letter-cutter and sculptor; continued at Ravensbourne College of Art and Design
- Cecil Ross Burnett, painter, founder
