= Bern Elliott and the Fenmen =

British beat group

- Origin: Erith, Kent, England
- Genres: R&B, rock and roll, pop
- Years active: 1961–1964
- Label: Decca
- Past members: Bern Elliott; Alan Judge; Jon Povey; Wally Allen; Eric Willmer

Bern Elliott and the Fenmen were a British beat music group, active between 1961 and 1964, and best known for their 1963 cover version of the song, "Money".

== Biography ==
Bernard Michael Elliott was born in Erith, Kent, on 17 November 1942. He attended Picardy School in Belvedere, before forming his own beat group, which became Bern Elliott and the Bluecaps before changing their name to become Bern Elliott and the Fenmen in 1961. The group performed over the next two years in clubs in Hamburg, Germany, and were signed to a recording contract with Decca in early 1963. "Money" was released by several artists at the time, but Bern Elliott and the Fenmen were unique as a group in registering a UK Singles Chart Top 20 hit with the song in December 1963. Elliott and the Fenmen's Merseybeat style belied their southern England roots. However, they did appear on 13 March 1964 episode of the UK television programme Ready Steady Go!, playing their follow-up hit, "New Orleans".

In May 1964, Elliott parted company with the Fenmen, and utilised the Klan for a short time as his backing group on one release "Good Times" / "What Do You Want With My Baby" on Decca F11970, which was released on 4 September 1964. The following year two further solo efforts, "Guess Who" and "Voodoo Woman", also failed to chart. The Fenmen continued, issuing further efforts both for Decca and CBS, including "I've Got Everything You Need, Babe" (1965) and "Rejected" (1966).

Led Zeppelin's Jimmy Page recalled:

"On the BBC, there's a little musical clip that comes on. I think the song's called 'I've Got Everything You Need, Babe.' There's a new version of it right now but, beforehand, when it was originally there, I heard this solo and I said, 'My goodness, that's me!' So I tracked it down and it was Bern Elliott and the Fenmen. So I must have done this session, because it's me, without a shadow of a doubt. I wouldn't have remembered if I did a solo, let alone a song or what was on the session – they were coming fast and furious. You didn't know who you were going in with."

After the Fenmen themselves disbanded, Wally Allen (a.k.a. Wally Waller) and Jon Povey moved on to the Pretty Things.

Lead guitarist Alan Judge died in May 2017. Frontman Bern Elliott died from heart failure in Margate, Kent on 13 September 2022, at the age of 79. On 9 May 2023, Jon Povey died at the age of 80.

== Band members ==
- Bern Elliott – lead vocals (1942–2022)
- Alan Judge – lead guitar (31 May 1942–May 2017)
- Dave Allen - rhythm guitar (19 January 1942)
- Jon Povey – drums (20 August 1942–2023)
- Wally Allen – rhythm guitar, vocals (born 1944)
- Eric Willmer – bass guitar (11 November 1942)

== Discography ==
=== Singles ===
- "Money" (1963) – UK number 14
- "New Orleans" (1964) – UK number 24

=== EPs ===
- Bern Elliott and the Fenmen (1964)
  - "Shake Sherry Shake" / "Please Mr. Postman" / "Shop Around" / "Mashed Potatoes” / “Chills" / "I Can Tell" (Decca) DFE 8561
