= Swan Song Records =

Vanity record label of Led Zeppelin

- Parent company: Warner Music Group
- Founded: 1974
- Founder: Led Zeppelin
- Defunct: 1983
- Status: Defunct
- Distributor: Atlantic Records
- Genre: Rock
- Country of origin: UK
- Location: London, England; New York City

Swan Song Records was a record label that was launched by the English rock band Led Zeppelin in 1974. It was overseen by Led Zeppelin's manager Peter Grant (who was named President) and was a vehicle for the band to promote its own products as well as sign artists who found it difficult to win contracts with major record labels. Other employees included the first Vice President, Danny Goldberg, who was succeeded by Alan Callan.

Artists that released material on the Swan Song label included Led Zeppelin itself, Bad Company, The Pretty Things, Dave Edmunds, Maggie Bell, Detective, and Sad Café. Swan Song ceased active operations in 1983.

== History ==
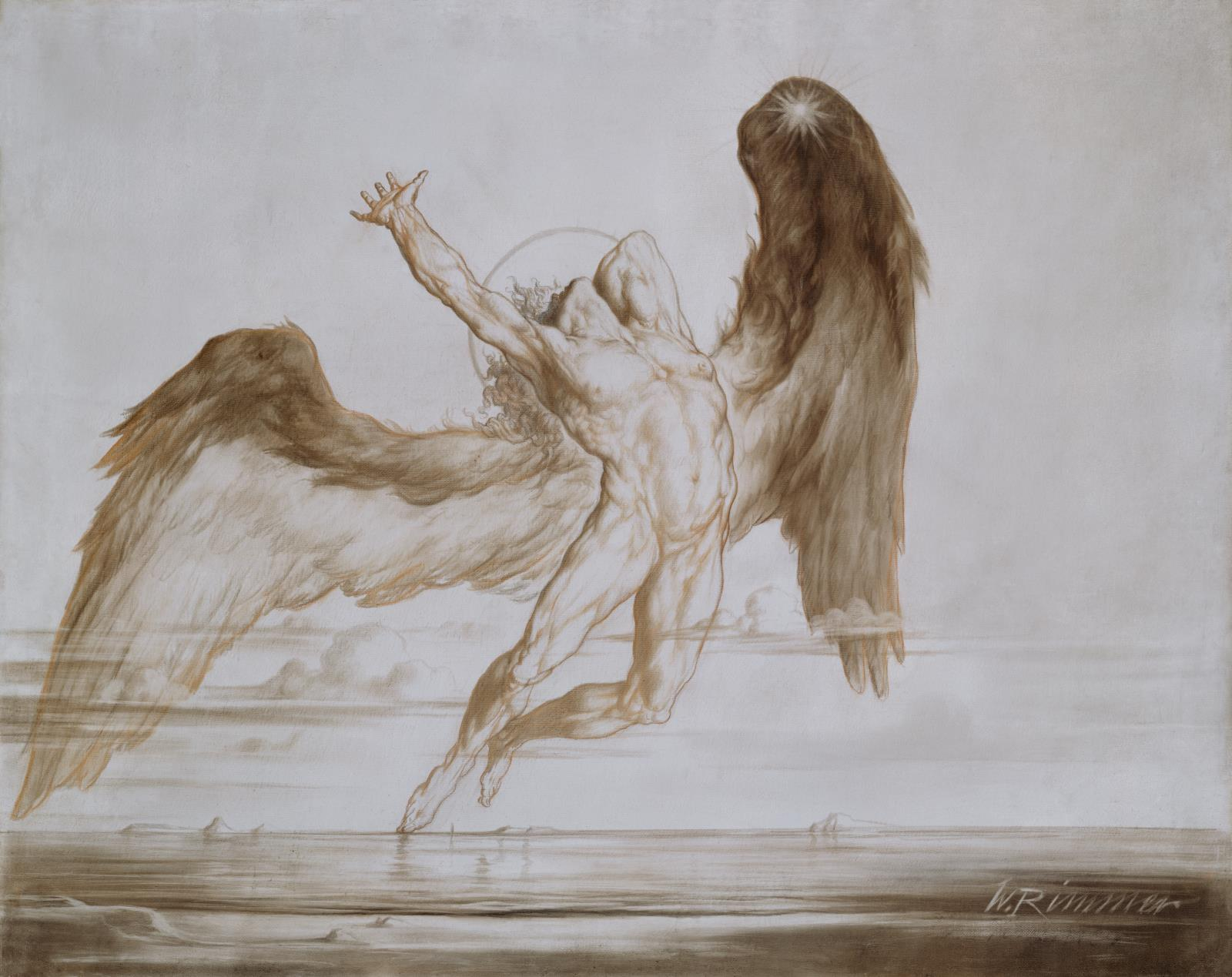
The Swan Song logo was based on Evening by William Rimmer (1869)

The decision to launch the label came after Led Zeppelin's five-year contract with Atlantic Records expired at the end of 1973, although Atlantic ultimately distributed Swan Song's releases. The company logo, designed by Hipgnosis and illustrated by Joe Petagno, was based on the 1869 painting Evening (also called The Fall of Day) depicting Icarus, by William Rimmer. The label was named after "Swan Song," an unreleased Led Zeppelin instrumental that was much later the basis for the song "Midnight Moonlight" by guitarist Jimmy Page's 1980s band The Firm.

The label was launched with parties in New York and Los Angeles. The label's first release was the self-titled debut album from Bad Company in June 1974. A lavish media party was held at Chislehurst Caves in Kent on 31 October 1974, to celebrate the release of the album Silk Torpedo by the Pretty Things.

In the original cut of the 1974 film Phantom of the Paradise, the name of a media conglomerate owned by the antagonist Swan was "Swan Song Enterprises". The name had to be deleted from the film prior to release due to objections from Swan Song Records. Although most references were removed, "Swan Song" remains visible in several scenes.

By April 1975, Swan Song had four albums–by Led Zeppelin, Bad Company, The Pretty Things, and Maggie Bell–in the Billboard Top 200 chart. The label also partly funded film projects, including Monty Python and the Holy Grail in 1975. In an interview he gave in January of that year, Page offered his perspective on the label:

We've got some good things lined up. I think the Pretty Things LP is brilliant. Absolutely brilliant. We're [record] executives and all that crap, but I'll tell you one thing the label was never right from the top Led Zeppelin records. It's designed to bring in other groups and promote acts that have had raw deals in the past. It's a vehicle for them and not for us to just make a few extra pennies over the top.

Two years later, he elaborated on Led Zeppelin's intention to found the label:

We'd been thinking about it for a while and we knew if we formed a label there wouldn't be the kind of fuss and bother we'd been going through over album covers and things like that. Having gone through, ourselves, what appeared to be an interference, or at least an aggravation, on the artistic side by record companies, we wanted to form a label where the artists would be able to fulfill themselves without all of that hassle. Consequently the people we were looking for the label would be people who knew where they were going themselves. We didn't really want to get bogged down in having to develop artists, we wanted people who were together enough to handle that type of thing themselves, like the Pretty Things. Even though they didn't happen, the records they made were very, very good.

Artists who signed with the label but did not produce any releases included The Message (which featured future Bon Jovi members Alec John Such and Richie Sambora) and Itchy Brother (which featured future members of The Kentucky Headhunters). Artists that Swan Song Records wanted to sign but opted to sign with other labels included Roy Harper and Bobby Parker. When Swan Song's offices were closed in 1983, early demos from Iron Maiden, Heart, and Q-Tips were found in the company archives.

Swan Song ceased operations in October 1983 due to the breakup of Led Zeppelin and Peter Grant's health problems. Presently, the label is strictly used for reissues of albums that were released by the label. The company name was revived for the 2012 Led Zeppelin live album Celebration Day.

== Label discography ==
=== Albums ===
- Bad Company – Bad Company (1974)
- Silk Torpedo – The Pretty Things (1974)
- Physical Graffiti – Led Zeppelin (1975)
- Suicide Sal – Maggie Bell (1975)
- Straight Shooter – Bad Company (1975)
- Savage Eye – The Pretty Things (1975)
- Run with the Pack – Bad Company (1976)
- Presence – Led Zeppelin (1976)
- The Song Remains the Same (soundtrack) – Led Zeppelin (1976)
- Burnin' Sky – Bad Company (1977)
- Detective – Detective (1977)
- Get It – Dave Edmunds (1977)
- It Takes One to Know One – Detective (1978)
- Tracks on Wax 4 – Dave Edmunds (1978)
- Desolation Angels – Bad Company (1979)
- Repeat When Necessary – Dave Edmunds (1979)
- In Through the Out Door – Led Zeppelin (1979)
- Midnight Flyer – Midnight Flyer (1981)
- Twangin'... – Dave Edmunds (1981)
- Sad Café – Sad Café (1981)
- Best of Dave Edmunds – Dave Edmunds (1981)
- Rock 'n' Roll Party (mini LP) – Midnight Flyer (1982)
- Death Wish II (soundtrack) – Jimmy Page (1982)
- Pictures at Eleven – Robert Plant (1982)
- Rough Diamonds – Bad Company (1982)
- Coda – Led Zeppelin (1982)
- Wildlife – Wildlife (1983)

=== Singles ===
- "Can't Get Enough/Little Miss Fortune" – Bad Company (1974)
- "Is It Only Love/Joey" – Pretty Things (1974)
- "Movin' On/Easy On My Soul" – Bad Company (1975)
- "Trampled Under Foot/Black Country Woman" – Led Zeppelin (1975)
- "Good Lovin' Gone Bad/Whiskey Bottle" – Bad Company (1975)
- "I'm Keeping.../Atlanta" – Pretty Things (1975)
- "Joey" – Pretty Things (1975)
- "Wishing Well/Comin' On Strong" – Maggie Bell (1975)
- "Feel Like Makin' Love/Wild Fire Woman" – Bad Company (1975)
- "Sad Eye/Remember That Boy" – Pretty Things (1976)
- "It isn't Rock 'N' Roll" – Pretty Things (1976)
- "Young Blood/Do Right By Your Woman" – Bad Company (1976)
- "Tonight/It Isn't Rock 'N' Roll" – Pretty Things (1976)
- "Honey Child/Fade Away" – Bad Company (1976)
- "Candy Store Rock/Royal Orleans" – Led Zeppelin (1976)
- "Royal Orleans/Candy Store Rock" – Led Zeppelin (1976)
- "Here Comes The Weekend/As Lovers Do" – Dave Edmunds (1976)
- "Where Or When/New York's A Lonely Town" – Dave Edmunds (1976)
- "Juju Man/What Did I Do Last Night" – Dave Edmunds (1977)
- "Burnin' Sky/Everything I Need" – Bad Company (1977)
- "I Knew the Bride" – Dave Edmund (1977)
- "Little Darlin'/I Knew the Bride" – Dave Edmunds (1977)
- "Recognition/Grim Reaper" – Detective (1977)
- "Get Out Of Denver/Worn Out Pockets, Brand New Suits" – Dave Edmunds (1977)
- "Something Beautiful/Dynamite" – Detective (1978)
- "Hazell/Night Flighting" – Maggie Bell (1978)
- "Deborah/What Looks Best on You" – Dave Edmunds (1978)
- "Television/Never Been in Love" – Dave Edmunds (1978)
- "Trouble Boys/What Looks Best On You" – Dave Edmunds (1978)
- "Rock 'N' Roll Fantasy/Crazy Circles" – Bad Company (1978)
- "A1 on the Juke Box/It's My Own Business" – Dave Edmunds (1979)
- "Gone, Gone, Gone/Take The Time" – Bad Company (1979)
- "Girls Talk" – Dave Edmunds (1979)
- "Queen of Hearts/The Creature From The Black Lagoon" – Dave Edmunds (1979)
- "Crawling From The Wreckage" – Dave Edmunds (1979)
- "Fool in the Rain/Hot Dog" – Led Zeppelin (1979)
- "Singing The Blues/Boys Talk" – Dave Edmunds (1980)
- "All My Love" – Led Zeppelin (1980)
- "Hot Dog" – Led Zeppelin (1980)
- "Almost Saturday Night/You'll Never Get Me Up (In One Of Those)" – Dave Edmunds (1981)
- "In My Eyes/Midnight Love" – Midnight Flye (1981)
- "La Di Da/Love Today" – Sad Cafe (1981)
- "The Race Is On" – Dave Edmunds with The Stray Cats (1981)
- "No Favours – No Way/I'm In Love Again" – Sad Cafe (1981)
- "Hold Me/Spring Greens" – B. A. Robertson and Maggie Bell (1981)
- "Waiting For You/Rock 'N' Roll Party" – Midnight Flyer (1982)
- "Who's To Blame (Death Wish Title)/Carole's Theme" – Jimmy Page (1982)
- "Slow Dancer/Burning Down One Side" – Robert Plant (1982)
- "Goosebumps/Key To Your Heart" – Maggie Bell (1982)
- "Burning Down One Side" – Robert Plant (1982)
- "Electricland" – Bad Company (1982)
- "Pledge Pin/Fat Lip" – Robert Plan (1982)
- "Crazy/All I Have To Do Is Dream" – Maggie Bel (1982)
- "Put Angels Around You/Here, There And Everywhere" – Maggie Bell and Bobbie Whitlock (1982)
- "Big Log/Far Post" – Robert Plant (1983)
- "Somewhere In The Night/Sun Don't Shine" – Wildlife (1983)

== See also ==
- List of record labels
- Led Zeppelin
