= Jon Povey =

Musical artist (1942-2023)

- Born: 20 August 1942; Barnhurst, England
- Died: 9 May 2023 (aged 80) Málaga Province, southern Spain
- Instruments: Keyboards, drums
- Years active: 1961–2023
- Formerly of: Bern Elliott and the Fenmen, The Pretty Things

Jon Povey (20 August 1942 – 9 May 2023) was an English drummer and keyboardist.

== Career ==
Born in Barnhurst, Kent, he grew up in Dartford, Kent, and in the early 1960s, Povey played drums in Bern Elliott and the Bluecaps, who had changed their name to Bern Elliott and the Fenmen by 1961. They were a five-piece beat and rhythm and blues band, and after signing to Decca Records, had a Top 20 hit with their cover of "Money (That's What I Want)" in December 1963. When lead singer Bern Elliott left the band, early in 1964, the other four continued as The Fenmen, releasing a few singles with strong vocal harmonies, such as their cover of "California Dreamin'" in 1966.

In 1967, Povey and Fenmen Wally Waller joined The Pretty Things, with Povey switching to keyboards instead of drums. Povey became the band's first keyboard player. Povey served four tenures in the Pretty Things between 1967 and 2007. His first release with the Pretty Things was their third studio album, Emotions (1967). Povey also released records as a solo artist.

== Death ==
Later on in life, Povey moved to Spain, where he also died at on 9 May 2023, aged 80, after battling for several years with leukemia. At the time of his death, Povey was working on both a solo album and an autobiography, both of which were to be entitled Dartford Boys, a reference to the town where Povey grew up.
