= Wally Waller =

Musical artist (born 1944)

- Also known as: Wally Allen, Asa Jones
- Born: Alan Edward Waller; 9 April 1944 (age 82); Barnehurst, England
- Genres: Beat; R&B; rock
- Occupations: Musician, producer
- Instruments: Bass guitar, guitar, vocals
- Years active: 1963–present
- Formerly of: Bern Elliott and the Fenmen, The Pretty Things

Alan "Wally" Waller or Wally Allen (born 9 April 1944) is an English bassist and producer. He was a member of The Pretty Things on their most famous records, S.F. Sorrow and Parachute.

== Biography ==
Wally Waller was born Alan Edward Waller in Barnehurst and grew up in neighbouring Bexley, then in Kent.

In the early 1960s, Wally Waller played the rhythm guitar in Bern Elliott and the Fenmen, a five-piece beat and rhythm and blues band. They had a Top 20 hit with their cover of "Money (That's What I Want)" in December 1963. When lead singer Bern Elliott left the band, early in 1964, the other four continued as The Fenmen, releasing a few singles with strong vocal harmonies, such as their cover of "California Dreamin'" in 1966. Their last single, "Rejected", featured one of the first songs penned by Waller as an A-side.

In the early months of 1967, Wally Waller joined the Pretty Things as a bass player, replacing John Stax. At the same time, Jon Povey, the Fenmen's drummer, became the Pretty Things' keyboardist. Waller was a childhood friend of lead singer Phil May, and they started writing songs together for the Things' third studio album, Emotions, released in 1967. Their musical partnership continued on the next two albums, the rock opera S.F. Sorrow (1968) and its follow-up Parachute (1970), the latter being entirely written by May and Waller.

Wally Waller left the Pretty Things in 1971 to take up a job as producer for EMI at the invitation of Norman Smith. As a producer, he worked for Barclay James Harvest and Marcus Hook Roll Band, among others. He also produced the Pretty Things' Freeway Madness under the alias "Asa Jones", since the Things were then signed to Warner Bros. He contributed the song "Over the Moon" to the album and sang lead, also singing backing vocals on several other songs. He rejoined the Pretty Things from 1978 to 1981 and from 1994 to 2008.

== Discography ==
=== With Pretty Things ===
- Emotions (1967)
- Electric Banana (Library album by Pretty Things) (1967)
- More Electric Banana (Library album by Pretty Things) (1968)
- S.F. Sorrow (1968)
- Even More Electric Banana (Library album by Pretty Things) (1969)
- Philippe DeBarge (Pretty Things and Philippe Debarge - reissued as Rock St. Trop) (1969)
- Parachute (1970)
- Hot Licks (Library album by Pretty Things) (1973)
- Live 1978 (1978)
- Cross Talk (1980)
- On Air (1982)
- ... Rage Before Beauty (1999)
- Balboa Island (2007)
- Resurrection (1998)
- BBC Sessions (2003)
- 40th Anniversary - Live in Brighton (2006)
- Live at Rockpalast (2014)
- Bouquets From a Cloudy Sky (2014)
- Live at the BBC (2015)

=== As producer ===
- Barclay James Harvest, Barclay James Harvest and Other Short Stories (1971)
- Marcus Hook Roll Band, Tales of Old Grand Daddy (1973)
- John Lees, A Major Fancy (1977)

=== Other participations ===
- Twink, Think Pink (1970)
- Il Barritz (Several Pretty Things with Philippe DeBarge) (1975)
- Phil May & the Fallen Angels, Phil May & the Fallen Angels (1978)
- The Return of the Electric Banana (Library album by Phil May & the Fallen Angels) (1978)
- Do It (Library album by the Wally Waller Band) (1978)
- I Don't Feel Well (Library album by the Charlie Flake Band) (1981)
- The Fenmen, Sunstroke (2010)
- xPTs, Parachute Reborn (2012)
- xPTs, Parachute Revisited (2021) (LP issue - Renaissance Records)
