= S. F. Sorrow =

Studio album by The Pretty Things
- Released: 20 December 1968
- Recorded: November 1967–September 1968
- Studio: EMI, London
- Genre: Psychedelic rock; psychedelic pop; experimental rock; garage rock
- Length: 40:59
- Label: EMI Columbia (UK); Motown (USA)
- Producer: Norman Smith

The Pretty Things chronology
Emotions (1967)	S. F. Sorrow (1968)	Parachute (1970)

S. F. Sorrow is the fourth album by the English rock band the Pretty Things. Released in 1968, it is known as one of the first rock operas ever released.

== Background ==
The Pretty Things' April 1967 album Emotions was their last made under the Fontana label. It was an album they were dissatisfied with, but agreed to make in order to be released from their contract. The band had not had a major hit since early 1965, so in September 1967 they signed with EMI Records for a small advance that wasn't even enough to cover the huge amount of debt they had amassed. However, EMI did promise them complete creative control, and with that they asked Norman Smith (who had engineered all The Beatles' albums through Rubber Soul and had just finished producing Pink Floyd's The Piper At The Gates of Dawn) to produce the new album. Smith said yes and the first product released for the new label was the November 1967 single "Defecting Grey", which did not chart but introduced the group's new, heavily psychedelic sound. In the meantime, the band continued to play live shows and produce film soundtrack music under the name Electric Banana in order to pay off its debt.

== Composition ==
S. F. Sorrow is a psychedelic rock opera that explores the life of a single character "from rural birth to Prodigal's Oliver Twist freakout". PopMatters says that the album "mixes the story of the protagonist Sebastian and his journey towards learning to trust people and ultimate disillusionment with a psychedelic pop score that fittingly captured the mood of 1960s Swinging London". Phil May said regarding the Pretty Things' decision to record a rock opera, "We were looking for another way of making a 40-minute disk. I could never understand why an album had to be five A-sides and five B-sides with no connection. Pieces of music had been written for at least a 40-minute listen, and I thought the best way to do that was to overlay a story line and create music for the various characters and instances. It was the oldest concept in the world, but at the time nobody had done it before."

The initial seed of S.F. Sorrow was taken from a Phil May short story titled "Cutting Up Sergeant Time", about a man fighting in the trenches of World War I. Once the idea to tie the songs on the new album together with a narrative storyline was agreed upon, the story began to evolve, with new songs subsequently written in the studio or while waiting to go on set for their appearance in the film What's Good for the Goose. As May noted, "I was writing the story as the songs were written. And the story wasn’t complete when recording began. The music drove the story and the story drove the music, when it was necessary...It really did evolve on the studio floor." The first track written specifically for the album was "Bracelets of Fingers", and when new characters in a song like Baron Saturday were introduced, the plot would change accordingly.

The Pretty Things' album is generally considered to be the first rock opera. Members of the Who have claimed that S. F. Sorrow did not have an influence on Pete Townshend or his writing of Tommy, although the Pretty Things and several critics disagreed with the Who. Phil May claims that Townshend urged the group to release S. F. Sorrow in America before Tommy. Arthur Brown, who Pete Townshend produced at the time, states that Kit Lambert pressured Townshend to come up with a storyline to rival what The Pretty Things were creating in the studio. It is also claimed that Nirvana's October 1967 release The Story of Simon Simopath was the first rock album to contain a narrative storyline, although Phil May denies having heard the album at the time.

== Story ==
According to the printed story in the album's original liner notes, the lead character Sebastian F. Sorrow is born to parents who live in an ordinary factory town on a night when no star is to be seen. As a child he has a strong imagination and often dreams of the moon. As he comes of age he joins his father in the factory but the boom period is over, with many older workers now laid off. He falls in love with "the girl next door" but war is soon declared and out of a sense of duty, he enlists in the army. At the end of the years-long war he finds himself in the new country of "Amerik" and decides to move there, sending a balloon ticket to his girlfriend to come join him. However, just as the balloon arrives it explodes, taking the girl with it and plunging Sorrow into deep grief as he wanders the streets of New York City alone.

One day he is approached by Baron Saturday, wearing a black cloak and tall silk hat. He takes Sorrow's eyes and lifts him to the roofs of the city, where sparrows (prodded by Saturday) carry him on a journey through a hall of mirrors through which Sorrow sees fragments of his past life. At the end of the hall he walks up a spiral staircase to see "the most painful sight yet." Saturday then takes him to the Well of Destiny, after which he begins to search for new, spiritual values in life. However, as he wanders the streets once more he sees people who he believes will not be saved. As new values appear elusively out of reach and his madness slowly builds, it shuts out the light and only darkness remains.

== Recording ==
Recording for the album began at EMI (now Abbey Road) Studios not long after "Defecting Grey"'s release, with "Bracelets Of Fingers" and "Talkin' About The Good Times" put to tape in November 1967 and "Walking Through My Dreams" from 12-13 December. "Talkin' About The Good Times" and "Walking Through My Dreams", initially meant for the album, were both pulled for a February 1968 single which, like "Defecting Grey", did not chart. The rest of the album was completed between December 1967 and September 1968 in studio three (with the exception of "Well of Destiny" in studio two), with "Loneliest Person" being the final song recorded.

Producer Norman Smith and engineer Peter Mew were open to the band's experimentation, often coming up with new sounds and even new instruments (Dick Taylor remembers making a twangy dulcimer-like instrument for "Death"). Sessions often ran all the way into the early morning, sometimes as late as 6am, and would only stop when the engineers couldn't stand up anymore. In the process, Taylor recalls the studio's four-track machines being bounced with overdubs hundreds of times, along with new gadgets that "made a kazoo sound like a VC10." Instruments used during the recording of the album included sitar, mellotron, Tibetan drum, trumpets, recorder, and marching drum. The group were not concerned with playing the songs live, feeling that doing so would limit the album's development.

Midway through the album's recording, in April 1968, the group experienced a lineup change when drummer Skip Alan was replaced by Twink, formerly of the group Tomorrow. Twink recalls that when he joined, Skip had completed drum tracks for three of the album's songs, which did not need to be re-recorded. According to May, Twink was promised a share in the album's publishing if he would complete the album with them, since the group had no other way to pay him. The band's finances were so poor during this period that May ended up drawing the cover design himself, with photographs taken by Taylor.

== Release ==
The album's release was delayed several months by EMI, eventually appearing in the UK in December 1968, by which time psychedelia was fading in favor of rootsier sounds. The album's many overdubs made it too complex to perform live, so the band did not initially tour behind it; instead, they attempted two shows at the Roundhouse in January 1969 miming to pre-recorded tapes, with each band member playing a character from the story and May handling narration. The show did not go down well, not only because the audience wanted a truly live performance but because the group, along with the mixing engineer, had taken LSD before they were to go on stage. The album did not chart and the group partly blamed EMI for neglecting to mention the rock opera concept in its promotional materials, treating it as if it were just any other album of 13 songs. Both May and Taylor have expressed bitterness over the album's commercial failure and over The Who claiming "first rock opera" status with Tommy. According to May:

"It was a kick in the balls. It’s one thing to let us make the bloody thing, but then all they gave us was little quarter-inch adverts saying, ‘The new album by The Pretty Things’ – nothing about the story, nothing about the narrative. When Tommy came out, everybody was so keen because it was presented so well that everyone knew what it was: it was a rock opera. Ours, from six months earlier, was just a Pretty Things record.

In the United States, the album was released by Rare Earth Records, a Motown subsidiary which focused on white rock artists, in contrast to the generally black soul music artists of the main label. Motown acquired the rights to release S. F. Sorrow through a licensing deal with EMI. Rare Earth Records was launched with a five album promotional box set that included S. F. Sorrow alongside releases by Love Sculpture, Rustix, the Messengers and Rare Earth, the band the subsidiary was named after. However, S.F. Sorrow did not chart in America, either.

== Reception ==
Professional ratings
Review scores
Source	Rating
Rolling Stone	(unfavourable)
Melody Maker	(favourable)

In Rolling Stone, Lester Bangs termed it "an ultra-pretentious concept album, complete with strained 'story' [...] like some grossly puerile cross between the Bee Gees, Tommy, and the Moody Blues" and suggested that the band "should be shot for what they've done to English rock lyrics." By contrast, Melody Maker enthused that it represented a "much improved group" and praised the playing by each individual member.

Later reviews have been far more positive, with many considering the album a UK psychedelic classic. AllMusic said that the album "straddles the worlds of British blues and British psychedelia better than almost any record you can name". The New York Times wrote, "Loaded with rich harmonies, sharp dissonances, odd electronic effects, early Pink Floyd-style psychedelia, proto heavy metal and songs that drastically change styles from one moment to the next, the album was full of pop experiments and abstractions that have become a calling card for current underground alternative bands."

Mojo wrote in a review of the band's studio albums box set, "The Pretty Things stretched to their furthest extent for S.F. Sorrow. Slathered in backward guitar, sitar and mellotron, May’s gloomy extended piece about a disillusioned Great War soldier has a heft that fey Brit-psych contemporaries could not match. May’s molten-Wilfred Owen lyrics on Private Sorrow, the Greek chorus wails and Taylor’s sheet metal guitars on Old Man Going and Balloon Burning signposted a bad trip tour de force."

== Legacy ==
Professional ratings
Review scores
Source	Rating
AllMusic	4/5 stars
The Guardian	5/5 stars
New Musical Express	10/10
PopMatters	4/5 stars

In 1998, Pretty Things, along with Pink Floyd guitarist David Gilmour and singer Arthur Brown, performed the album in its entirety at Abbey Road Studios for an Internet simulcast, which was recorded and released as the album Resurrection the following year. The 2009 incarnation of the Pretty Things featuring May, Taylor, Frank Holland, George Perez, Jack Greenwood and Mark St. John would perform the album onstage on 10 April, at the 5th annual le Beat Bespoke Weekender sponsored by Mojo magazine. In 2023, all 13 of the band's studio albums were released in the box set The Complete Studio Albums 1965-2020.

AllMusic wrote in its review of the album, "Although it may have helped inspire Tommy, it is, simply, not nearly as good. That said, it was first and has quite a few nifty ideas and production touches. And it does show a pathway between blues and psychedelia that the Rolling Stones, somewhere between Satanic Majesties, "We Love You," "Child of the Moon," and Beggars Banquet, missed entirely." The Guardian called it "one of the few consistently brilliant British psych albums [...] the taut drums and endless two-note guitar riff of Balloon Burning sounds remarkably like motorik krautrock a decade early [...] the SF Sorrow-era Pretty Things seem not disaster-prone but perfectly poised, not behind the times but ahead of them."

== Track listing ==
Side one
No.	Title	Writer(s)	Length
1.	"S. F. Sorrow Is Born"	Phil May, Dick Taylor, Wally Waller	3:12
2.	"Bracelets of Fingers"	May, Taylor, Waller	3:41
3.	"She Says Good Morning"	May, Taylor, Waller, Twink	3:23
4.	"Private Sorrow"	May, Taylor, Waller, Jon Povey	3:51
5.	"Balloon Burning"	May, Taylor, Waller, Povey	3:51
6.	"Death"	May, Taylor, Waller, Povey, Twink	3:05
Total length:			21:03

Side two
No.	Title	Writer(s)	Length
7.	"Baron Saturday"	May, Taylor, Waller	4:01
8.	"The Journey"	May, Taylor, Waller, Twink	2:46
9.	"I See You"	May, Taylor, Waller	3:56
10.	"Well of Destiny"	May, Taylor, Waller, Povey, Twink, Norman Smith	1:46
11.	"Trust"	May, Taylor, Waller	2:49
12.	"Old Man Going"	May, Taylor, Waller, Povey, Twink	3:09
13.	"Loneliest Person"	May, Taylor, Waller, Twink	1:29
Total length:			19:56

== Personnel ==
=== The Pretty Things ===
- Phil May – vocals
- Dick Taylor – lead guitar, vocals
- Wally Waller – bass, guitar, vocals, wind instruments, piano
- Jon Povey – organ, sitar, Mellotron, percussion, vocals
- Skip Alan – drums (on some tracks, quit during recording)
- Twink – drums (on some tracks, replaced Alan), vocals

=== Production ===
- Norman Smith – producer
- Peter Mew – engineer
- Ken Scott – engineer on "Bracelets of Fingers"
- Phil May – sleeve design
- Dick Taylor – photography

== See also ==
- Album era
