= Repertoire Records =

German classic rock record label from Hamburg

Repertoire Records is a record label from Hamburg, Germany (with UK subsidiaries in Leatherhead, Surrey and London), specialising in reissues of classic pop and rock albums originally issued in the 1960s and 1970s. It was founded in 1982 by Killy Kumberger and Rudi Slezak. The chairman and owner since 1998 is Thomas Neelsen.

== See also ==
- Lists of record labels
