= Dick Taylor =

English musician (born 1943)

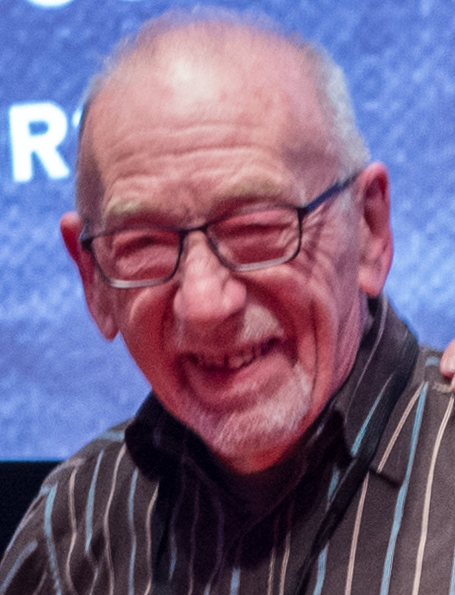
- Taylor in 2017

Background information
- Born: Richard Clifford Taylor; 28 January 1943 (age 83); Dartford, Kent, England
- Genres: Rock; R&B
- Occupations: Musician; songwriter; record producer
- Instruments: Guitar; bass guitar; piano; banjo
- Years active: 1962–present
- Label: St. George

Richard Clifford Taylor (born 28 January 1943) is an English musician, best known as the guitarist and founder of the Pretty Things. Taylor was also a founding member of the Rolling Stones, playing guitar and bass guitar, but left the band to resume his studies at Sidcup Art College. While there he formed the Pretty Things in September 1963, which he played with until the band's retirement in 2018. As of 2024, he plays lead guitar for the band the Hillmans.

== Early life ==
Richard Clifford Taylor was born in Livingstone Hospital, Dartford, and attended Dartford Grammar School. While at grammar school, he met Mick Jagger. Taylor attended Sidcup Art College, and started playing the guitar when his classmate, Robert Beckwith, bought a ukulele. Taylor was into rhythm and blues music, and his influences while at college included Bo Diddley, Jimmy Reed, Muddy Waters, Chuck Berry.

== Career ==
=== The Rolling Stones ===
While he was at Sidcup Art College, Taylor met his grammar school classmate Mick Jagger, and the two soon bonded over music, and soon they started to play guitar with each other.

In July 1962, the Rolling Stones was formed when Taylor, Jagger and Keith Richards' three-piece group Little Boy Blue and the Blue Boys joined Brian Jones and Ian Stewart's Rollin' Stones. Initially, Taylor played lead guitar in the band, but switched to bass to accommodate Jones. That November, Taylor left to return to art college. Taylor never recorded with the Rolling Stones, whose debut single was issued in June 1963.

Taylor mentioned that, although he got on very well with the band, many different problems led to him leaving the Stones, including his switch from guitar to bass. Taylor last met up with members of the band when they were at the Isle of Wight Festival in 2007.

=== The Pretty Things ===
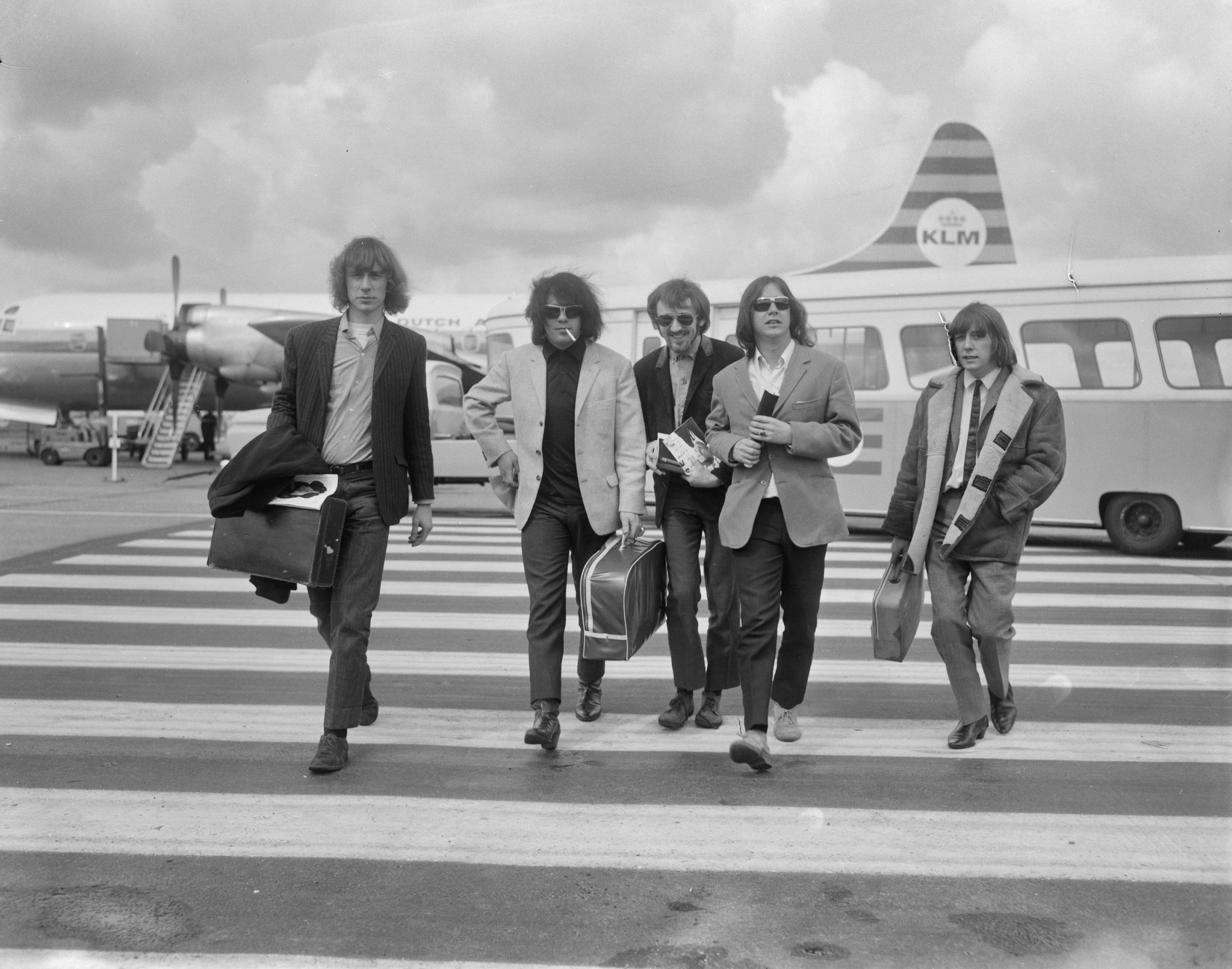
Taylor (centre) with The Pretty Things in 1965

In 1963, Taylor formed the Pretty Things with vocalist Phil May, a fellow Sidcup student who convinced Dick that he should form a new band. With the Pretty Things, Taylor once again played his preferred guitar position.

He left the Pretty Things in June 1969, after the release of their concept album S.F. Sorrow, often cited as one of the first rock operas and featuring cover art photography by Dick. Taylor cited wanting to try out different experiences as one of the reasons for initially leaving, saying: "I'd been doing it for a long time. Maybe, almost, having done that, that's kind of a rich thing, the end of that little phase, "now we've done that"--well, let's see what else I could do. And also, since I'd left art school, I hadn't done anything else apart from being in the Pretty Things". A second incarnation of the band began after Taylor's departure, which mainly focused on producing psychedelic music.

The band released a few more albums without Taylor and disbanded in 1976. After a few reunion gigs in the UK and Netherlands, the band regrouped with Taylor in 1979 to release Cross Talk. Taylor remained with the Pretty Things until they broke up in 2018 due to May's failing health (May eventually died in 2020).

=== Other work ===
In addition to his work with the Pretty Things, Taylor co-produced Hawkwind's 1970 debut album, on which he also played guitar, as well as Cochise's first album and Skin Alley's first album. His contribution to punk rock was a recording by Auntie Pus.

During the second half of the 1980s, Taylor played guitar with the English post-punk band the Mekons. Years later, Taylor reunited with Mekons members Jon Langford and Susie Honeyman and performed as The Mini Mekons throughout the 2010s.

He recorded with Andre Williams in Chicago for George Paulus' St. George Records.

Taylor once played a gig with one of his influences, Jimmy Reed.

As of 2024, he plays lead guitar with a band called the Hillmans (the lead singer of the Hillmans is Tony Minx, and the 'Hillmans' is a reference to the Hillman Minx).

== Personal life ==
Taylor married his wife Melissa in Fulham on 14 June 1969.

In the 1970s, Taylor worked in graphics, including painting murals, and for a time worked for a jeans company. His last job before rejoining the Pretty Things was as a transport manager.

As of 2017 he lived on the Isle of Wight, in the town of Ventnor, where he teaches guitar.
