= Phil May (singer) =

English vocalist (1944–2020)

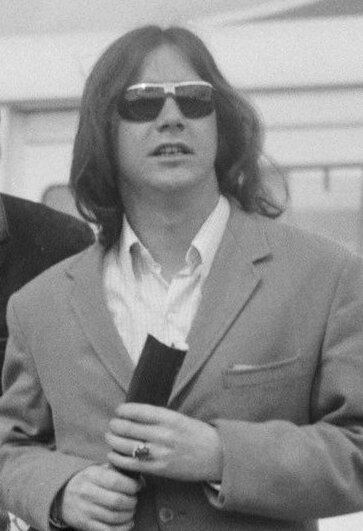
- May in 1965

Background information
- Also known as: Philip Dennis Arthur Kattner
- Born: Philip Dennis Arthur Wadey; 9 November 1944; Dartford, Kent, England
- Died: 15 May 2020 (aged 75) King's Lynn, Norfolk, England
- Genres: Rock and roll; pop; rock
- Occupations: Singer; musician; songwriter
- Instruments: Vocals; harmonica; percussion
- Years active: 1963–2018

Philip Dennis Arthur May (born Wadey, later Kattner; 9 November 1944 – 15 May 2020) was an English vocalist. He gained fame in the 1960s as the lead singer of The Pretty Things, of which he was a founding member. May remained a member throughout the band's changing line-up over the years, and was one of the band's main lyricists. He was the primary lyricist for the album S.F. Sorrow.

== Early life ==
Born Philip Wadey in Dartford, Kent on 9 November 1944, he was raised by his aunt and uncle, whose surname was May. In childhood, he was sent back to live with his mother and stepfather, whose surname was Kattner, but later decided to change his name to May.

== Career ==
=== The Pretty Things ===
He formed the Pretty Things at Sidcup Art College in 1963 with guitarist Dick Taylor, who had recently left the fledgling Rolling Stones. With May as lead singer, the band became part of the British blues rock scene and quickly gained a recording contract. They became popular and had a number of hit singles including the UK Top Ten "Don't Bring Me Down".

In the late 1960s, The Pretty Things started to branch out into psychedelia and May became a prominent counterculture figure, known for his claim of having "the longest hair in Britain", drug-taking and bisexuality. The 1968 album S.F. Sorrow, which was released on the Motown imprint Rare Earth, was regarded as the first rock opera album. The songs and lyrics were based on stories written by May, which were often composed while the album was being recorded. May later admitted that his usage of LSD had a major impact on the album, saying ""It was like a sharpening of the imagination for me. I don't think S.F. Sorrow would have been impossible without it, but there's a lot of acid [in] the imagery." The album was not successful at the time, only later becoming a cult favourite. May remained with the Pretty Things until they retired in 2018, following a final concert with guests including David Gilmour and Van Morrison.

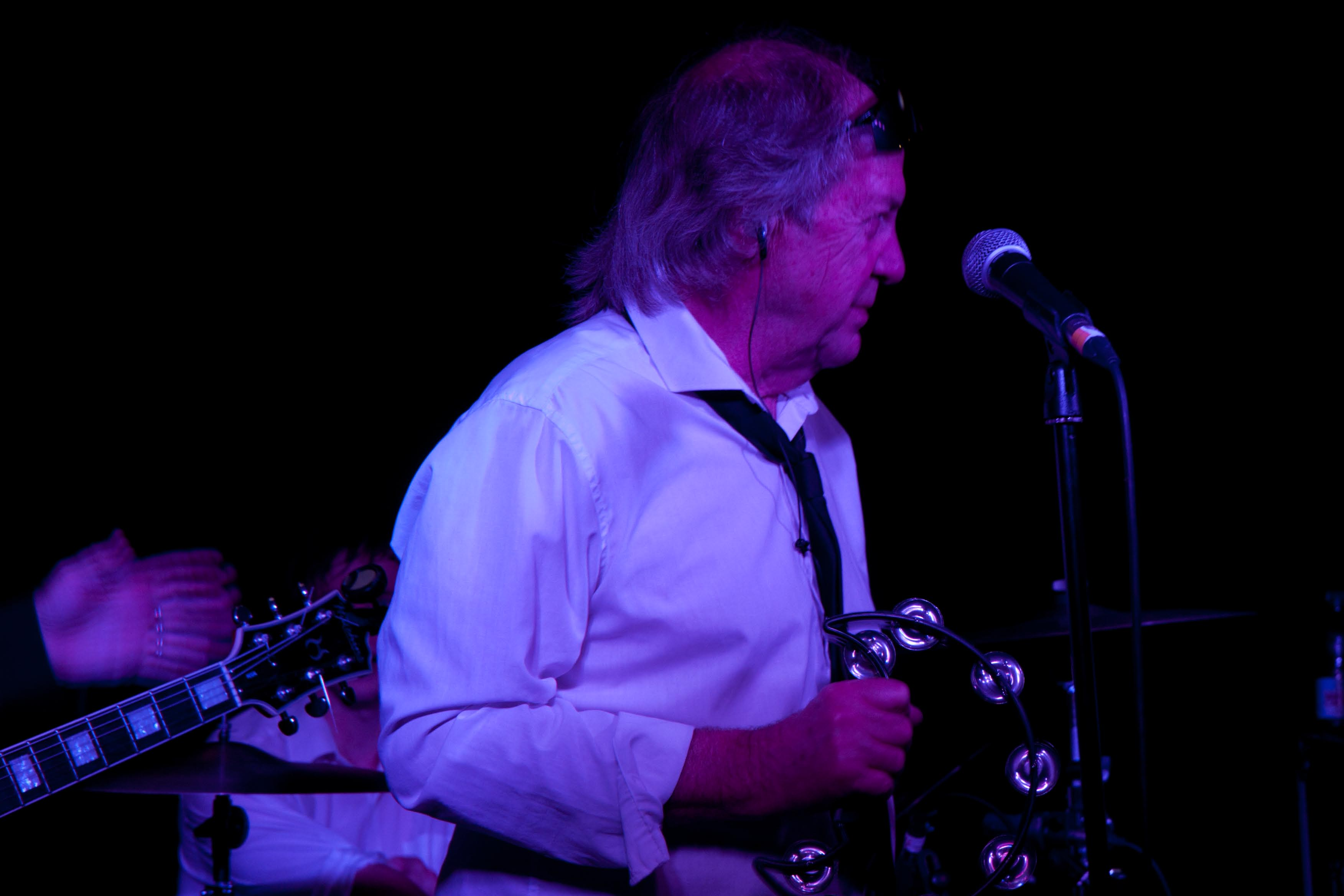
May on stage with the Pretty Things in 2013

=== Phil May and the Fallen Angels ===
In 1976 a new group called the Fallen Angels, led by guitarist Mickey Finn, with Greg Ridley from Spooky Tooth and Humble Pie, Twink from the Pretty Things, and Bob Weston from Fleetwood Mac set out to record an album and for vocals recruited May. However, after they had recorded only eight partially complete songs, all except May abandoned the project. May recruited some more players to complete the album Phil May and the Fallen Angels, which was only released in the Netherlands.

== Personal life ==
May identified as bisexual. He was married to Electra Nemon, daughter of Oscar Nemon. They had a son, Paris, and a daughter, Sorrel. The marriage ended in divorce.

In 2014, May was diagnosed with Chronic obstructive pulmonary disease and Emphysema. This led to the Pretty Things retiring in 2018.

He died at 7:05am on 15 May 2020, aged 75, in a hospital in King's Lynn, from complications following hip surgery after a cycling accident. He was survived by his long-term partner, Colin Graham.
