= Midnight to Six Man =

"Midnight To Six Man"
- Swedish picture sleeve

Single by the Pretty Things
- B-side: "Can't Stand the Pain"
- Released: 17 December 1965
- Recorded: 5–6 November 1965
- Studio: IBC, London
- Genre: Blues rock; R&B
- Length: 2:23
- Label: Fontana
- Songwriters: Dick Taylor; Phil May
- Producer: Glyn Johns

The Pretty Things singles chronology
"Cry to Me" (1965)	"Midnight To Six Man" (1965)	"Come See Me" / "L.S.D" (1966)

Audio
- "Midnight to Six Man" on YouTube

"Midnight to Six Man" is a song written by guitarist Dick Taylor and lead vocalist Phil May, initially recorded by their band the Pretty Things. By 1965, the band had established themselves in the UK with R&B hits on the Record Retailer chart. However, Taylor and May had begun writing songs together by that summer. The release of a single was hindered by touring and drummer Viv Prince, who was fired and replaced by Skip Alan. "Midnight to Six Man" was written prior to a gig in Gravesend, Kent and recorded during a nightly session at IBC Studios upon their return to London in November 1965.

Musically, "Midnight to Six Man" is a blues rock song with elements of R&B, featuring a call and response chorus and a "bluesy guitar". Lyrically, the song revolves around the band's visit to nightclubs in London. Record producer Glyn Johns augmented the Pretty Things with session musicians Nicky Hopkins on piano and Margo Lewis of Goldie and the Gingerbreads on organ.

Fontana Records released "Midnight to Six Man" in the UK in conjunction with their second studio album Get the Picture? on 17 December 1965, the B-side was "Can't Stand the Pain". Although the band had high hopes for the song, it was a commercial failure, stalling at number 46 on the Record Retailer chart in January 1966. Upon release, the single received primarily positive reviews in the press, with most critics praising lyrics but criticizing the apparent lack of melody. Retrospectively, "Midnight to Six" man has been considered one of the Pretty Things' best songs and has been referenced in other media.

== Background ==
By the summer of 1965, the Pretty Things had established themselves in the United Kingdom, having had three top-30 singles on the Record Retailer chart with "Don't Bring Me Down" (1964), "Honey I Need", and "Cry to Me" (both 1965), in addition to their debut album The Pretty Things (1965) reaching the album chart's top-10. With the exception of "Honey, I Need", which was co-written by the band's lead guitarist Dick Taylor, their repertoire consisted almost entirely of R&B covers, including Bo Diddley and Jimmy Reed. Partially because of this, their commercial appeal had started diminishing, as "Cry to Me" had received a particularly low charting compared to their previous two outings. By the late summer of 1965, Taylor and lead vocalist Phil May had started becoming a developed songwriting duo, which was reflected in the August 1965 extended play Rainin' in My Heart; work on their second album Get the Picture? was additionally well underway. Despite this, by the winter of 1965, the Pretty Things hadn't released any music since that summer.

"All the traveling meant we weren't in this country long enough to make a record between some time in the summer and last November [1965]. No wonder people thought we'd forgotten about making discs."

— Phil May, 1966

The Pretty Things had grown tired of drummer Viv Prince during the autumn of 1965, partly fueled by a disastrous tour to New Zealand where Prince wandered around drunk on stage and setting props on fire and being escorted off the airplane at the airport. The antics and surrounding media scandals resulted in the New Zealand Parliament banning the band from returning to the country. After an altercation with the brother of Swedish heavyweight boxer Ingemar Johansson and a refusal to perform in front of a crowd at Manor Club in Stockport, Prince was fire from the band, which was announced in November 1965, shortly before Get The Picture? and a Christmas single were due for release. Prince was replaced by 17-year old drummer Skip Alan.

== Recording and Composition ==
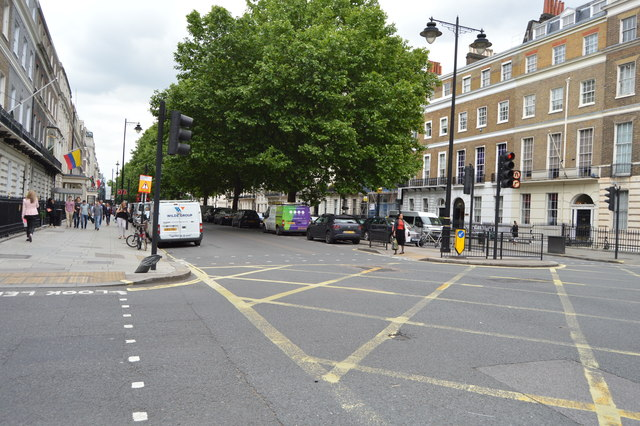
"Midnight to Six Man" was recorded at IBC Studios on Portland Place in London.

According to a January 1966 interview with the group's rhythm guitarist Brian Pendleton, the Pretty Things' record label had booked time at the recording studio on the night between 5–6 November. (Note: According to group rhythm guitarist Brian Pendleton, "Midnight to Six Man" was written in November 1965 prior to a gig in Gravesend, and recorded during a nightly session afterwards. The Pretty Things performed their only gig in Gravesend in November 1965 on the 5th.) However, the band lacked a suitable song, resulting in a "panic station". However, by 2 PM on 5 November, Taylor and May had composed "Midnight To Six Man" just before the band travelled to Gravesend, Kent for a gig. The band returned to London by 11 PM and immediately entered IBC Studios for the recording. Pendleton stated that they remained in the studio until 5 AM the following morning; Taylor estimated that they remained in the studio until 6 AM. However, the group's bassist John Stax claimed that the band worked on "Midnight to Six Man" for 16 consecutive hours, "playing all night".

"We spent 16 hours on that song [Midnight to Six Man]. We played it all night and finally got it down. Dick [Taylor] did a beautiful solo. We did take after take - we would've done 30 takes. We hadn't played it live before."

— John Stax

"Midnight to Six Man" was the first track by the band not to be recorded with their original line-up, being the first to feature drummer Skip Alan. "Midnight To Six Man" and Get the Picture? sessions also marked the first time record producer Glyn Johns was involved in the band's creative process; prior to this, Fontana's head chief Jack Baverstock or session drummer Bobby Graham had produced the Pretty Things' recordings. Additionally, Johns made use of session musicians specifically for the recording of "Midnight to Six Man"; piano session player Nicky Hopkins and Margo Lewis, the organist from the all-female band Goldie and the Gingerbreads augment the Pretty Things on the tracks.

Musically as recorded by the Pretty Things, "Midnight to Six Man" was written in the key of E major and has a BPM of 127. It is a rhythm and blues-influenced song that features elements of Blues rock, which was a prevalent thematic in the band's music at the time. This includes a call and response pre-chorus sung by May, who gets a sung response from Brian Pendleton and John Stax. The song opens with a "descending drum roll" which is "anchored" by an unusually bluesy guitar riff that is "jerkily rhythmed" and "compulsive". Between the verses and choruses, the song transitions to a half-time metre, which is characterized by a "spiky blues guitar rock riff" and "double time" vocals. Taylor's guitar solo on the track is extensive, with "twisting that's typical of the early Pretty Things, but with a sense of abandon that's also somewhat similar to the early Who". According to critic Richie Unterberger, the inclusion of Hopkins and Lewis gives the song a "full arrangement" compared to the Pretty Things' other early songs. Lyrically, "Midnight to Six Man" was a "celebration" of the band's nocturnal visits to London's nightclubs. According to Alexis Petridis, the song's lyrics were a "paean to the life of a jobbing musician so evocative you can almost smell the sweat and cigarette smoke".

== Release and reception ==
According to the band members, it was clear that "Midnight to Six Man" was a "monster track" that would put them back into the charts. Fontana Records released "Midnight to Six Man" during the same month as the Pretty Things' second studio album Get The Picture?, although the song was not included from the album. The single was issued in the United Kingdom through Fontana on 17 December 1965. (Note: Catalogue number TF-647.) The single's B-side "Can't Stand The Pain", described as a "mutant offspring between Joe Meek and R&B, had been taken from the album. In conjunction with the release of "Midnight to Six Man", the Pretty Things recorded a promotional film directed by Caterina Arvat and Anthony West that was inspired by the Beatles 1964 film A Hard Day's Night. The songs performed in the film, including "Midnight to Six Man", were later included on the extended play The Pretty Things on Film during the summer of 1966.

"We were quite shocked when it wasn't actually a hit. Everybody was, from the record company down."

— Dick Taylor (2018)

"Midnight to Six Man" entered the Record Retailer chart on 26 January 1966 at the position of number 46 during the sole week it occupied the charts. Similarly in the New Musical Express chart, the song only spent four weeks, reaching a peak of number 26. Despite this, the single was a success amongst pirate radio stations, including Radio London, where it peaked at number 12 on their Fab 40 chart. Internationally, "Midnight to Six Man" charted in Australia, partly due to the controversy that had occurred during their tour of New Zealand in the summer of 1965. The single fared best in the Netherlands, where it reached number 16 and 19 on the Dutch Single Top 100 and Dutch Top 40, respectively. Despite these international successes, "Midnight to Six Man" was generally considered a chart failure in the UK, as their previous single "Cry to Me" had reached the top-30.

Upon release, the single received favorable reviews in the music press. Writing for Disc Weekly, journalist Penny Valentine stated that although the Pretty Things usually did not impress her with their singles, she liked "Midnight to Six Man" better than most, partially due to the "dear peculiar lyrics". She notes that it's lyrically a tale of "modern frustration" because "he's on the night shift" and never sees his friends, but notes that the drums are "muffled" and Phil May sings in a "mysterious echo voice". In Record Mirror, Peter Jones and Norman Jopling believe that the lyrics "come over more clearly" on repeated plays, and positively note the "guitar figures". They note that the "theme" has a "grow-on-you-appeal". Derek Johnson of New Musical Express had more mixed opinions, positively noting the "striding guitar work" and "walloping drums", praising the lyrics for being "intriguing". He does however note that the song appears to lack a melody "to hum on the street". In Billboard magazine, the song is described as a "solid sound" with a "big beat" and a "teen-aimed lyric". In Cash Box magazine, it is described as having a "funky, hard driving taste of the English sound" with a "powerful, infectious beat".

Retrospectively, "Midnight to Six Man" has received praise, with journalist Brian Hogg stating that the band had "lost none of the purpose" during the New Zealand tour, but rather gained "strength" from the incident, which showcased in the song's maturity. Hogg contended that the song was a "pointed finger" against the band's critics. According to Unterberger, "Midnight to Six Man" was the best song recorded by the Pretty Things during the 1960s. Petridis stated that May gave the song an "extra frisson" by the attitude in his vocal performance. The Clash's 1978 song "(White Man) In Hammersmith Palais" reference "Midnight to Six Man" in a line which Joe Strummer included as a nod to Phil May. In 2001, it was included on the Nuggets II: Original Artyfacts from the British Empire and Beyond, 1964–1969 box set.

== Personnel ==
Personnel according to the liner notes of the 2001 box set Nuggets II: Original Artyfacts from the British Empire and Beyond, 1964–1969 unless otherwise noted.

The Pretty Things

- Phil May – lead vocals
- Dick Taylor – lead guitar
- Brian Pendleton – rhythm guitar, backing vocals
- John Stax – bass guitar, backing vocals
- Skip Alan – drums

Other personnel

- Glyn Johns – producer
- Nicky Hopkins – piano
- Margo Lewis – organ

== Chart performance ==
Weekly chart performance for "Midnight to Six Man"
Chart (1965–1966)	Peak position
Australia (Kent Music Report)	62
Netherlands (Dutch Top 40)	19
Netherlands (Single Top 100)	16
UK (Fab 40)	12
UK (New Musical Express)	26
UK (Record Retailer)	46
