= Nuggets II: Original Artyfacts from the British Empire and Beyond, 1964–1969 =

Box set by Various artists
- Released: June 19, 2001
- Genres: Psychedelic rock Psychedelic pop Freakbeat; Garage rock Proto-punk
- Label: Rhino
- Producer: Alec Palao

Various artists chronology
Nuggets: Original Artyfacts from the First Psychedelic Era, 1965–1968 (1972)	Nuggets II: Original Artyfacts from the British Empire and Beyond, 1964–1969 (2001)	Hallucinations: Psychedelic Pop Nuggets from the WEA Vaults (2004)

Professional ratings
Review scores
Source	Rating
AllMusic	4.5/5 stars
Entertainment Weekly	A

Nuggets II: Original Artyfacts from the British Empire and Beyond, 1964–1969 is a four-disc box set from Rhino Records, released in 2001.

While the original Nuggets compilation concentrated on the American pop and rock scene, the second Nuggets shifted its focus to the rest of the world, collecting cuts from the United Kingdom (such as The Pretty Things and Small Faces), Canada (The Guess Who and The Haunted), Japan (The Mops), Australia (The Easybeats, The Masters Apprentices, Ronnie Burns), New Zealand (The La De Da's and Chants R&B), Sweden (Tages), Iceland (Thor's Hammer), The Netherlands (Q65, Cuby + Blizzards and Golden Earring), Peru (We All Together), Brazil (Os Mutantes), Uruguay (Los Shakers), Czechoslovakia (The Matadors), Austria (The Slaves), Spain (Los Bravos), And México (los chijuas)

The compilation was produced by music consultant Alec Palao and production coordinator Gary Stewart. The packaging includes a fully illustrated book in a box, with the design of each individual CD resembling those of the late 1960s British record labels Deram, Reaction and Immediate, and Shel Talmy's Planet Records. The liner notes are by Bomp's Greg Shaw.

== Critical reception ==
Entertainment Weekly wrote that "its melodious late-’60s clamor pays tribute less to the cool of the Beatles and Stones than to the alienation of the Who and the Kinks—with a nod to the American garage." The New York Times wrote: "This follow-up to the 1998 boxed set of classic American garage-rock and psychedelic nuggets is a highly recommended grab-bag of bad-boy classics and obscurities."

== Track listing ==
=== Disc one ===
1. "Making Time" (The Creation) – 2:58
2. "Father's Name Is Dad" (Fire) – 2:29
3. "I Can Hear the Grass Grow" (The Move) – 3:07
4. "My Friend Jack" (The Smoke) – 3:01
5. "My White Bicycle" (Tomorrow) – 3:16
6. "I'll Keep Holding On" (The Action) – 3:39
7. "When the Night Falls" (The Eyes) – 2:33
8. "Sorry" (The Easybeats) – 2:35
9. "Imposters of Life's Magazine" (The Idle Race) – 2:19
10. "How Is the Air Up There?" (The La De Da's) 2:37
11. "Mud in Your Eye" (The Fleur de Lys) – 3:03
12. "Everything (That's Mine)" (The Motions) – 2:03
13. "Garden of My Mind" (The Mickey Finn) – 2:34
14. "Take a Heart" (The Sorrows) – 3:16
15. "The Life I Live" (Q65) – 3:20
16. "Midnight to Six Man" (The Pretty Things) – 2:20
17. "I See the Rain" (The Marmalade) – 3:48
18. "The First Cut Is the Deepest" (The Koobas) – 3:06
19. "You Stole My Love" (The Mockingbirds) – 2:41
20. "125 [album version]" (The Haunted) – 2:32
21. "My Mind's Eye" (Small Faces) – 2:03
22. "Going Nowhere" (Los Bravos) – 2:20
23. "All Night Stand" (The Thoughts) – 2:05
24. "War or Hands of Time" (The Masters Apprentices) – 2:51
25. "It's a Sin to Go Away" (We All Together) – 3:50
26. "A Dream for Julie" (Kaleidoscope) – 2:47
27. "I Read You Like An Open Book" (Tages) – 2:38

=== Disc two ===
1. "Children of the Sun" (The Misunderstood) – 2:52
2. "Save My Soul" (Wimple Winch) – 3:06
3. "Desdemona" (John's Children) – 2:27
4. "I Can Only Give You Everything" (Them, Van Morrison) – 2:42
5. "Lost Girl" (The Troggs) – 2:33
6. "I Must Be Mad" (Craig) – 2:47
7. "Say Those Magic Words" (The Birds) – 3:15
8. "Baby Your Phrasing Is Bad" (Caleb) – 3:16
9. "Daddy Buy Me a Girl" (Golden Earring) – 2:41
10. "Exit Stage Right" (Ronnie Burns) – 2:30
11. "Gone Is the Sad Man" (Timebox) – 3:46
12. "I'm Rowed Out" (The Eyes) – 2:57
13. "You've Got a Habit of Leaving" (Davy Jones, The Lower Third) – 2:29
14. "Reflections of Charles Brown" (Rupert's People) – 4:19
15. "Words Enough to Tell You" (The Mascots) – 1:58
16. "That's the Way It's Got to Be" (The Poets) – 2:36
17. "14 Hour Technicolour Dream" (The Syn) – 2:54
18. "Walking Through My Dreams" (The Pretty Things) – 3:38
19. "You Said" (The Primitives) – 2:19
20. "This Life of Mine" (The Lost Souls) – 2:43
21. "Shadows and Reflections" (The Action) – 2:52
22. "Friday on My Mind" (The Easybeats) – 2:52
23. "In the Land of the Few" (Love Sculpture) – 3:57
24. "For Another Man" (The Motions) – 1:49
25. "Fire Brigade" (The Move) – 2:24
26. "Gaby" (The Boots) – 2:32
27. "Biff, Bang, Pow" (The Creation) – 2:26

=== Disc three ===
1. "Your Body Not Your Soul" (Cuby + Blizzards) – 2:18
2. "Cathy, Come Home" (The Twilights) – 2:01
3. "Circles (Instant Party)" (The Fleur de Lys) – 3:03
4. "Get Down from the Tree [album version]" (The Matadors) – 3:30
5. "Cry in the Night" (Q65) – 2:16
6. "Changing the Colors of Life" (Los Chijuas) – 3:00
7. "Social End Product" (The Bluestars) – 2:33
8. "Crawdaddy Simone" (The Syndicats) – 3:16
9. "Don't You Remember?" (The Sound Magics) – 2:14
10. "It's My Pride" (The Guess Who) – 2:47
11. "Magic Potion" (The Open Mind) – 3:34
12. "You're Driving Me Insane" (The Missing Links) – 2:57
13. "Who Dat?" (The Jury) – 2:17
14. "A Midsummer's Night Scene" (John's Children) – 2:35
15. "Listen to the Sky" (Sands) – 3:46
16. "How to Find a Lover" (The Mockingbirds) – 1:56
17. "Days of the Broken Arrows" (The Idle Race) – 3:49
18. "By My Side" (The Elois) – 2:17
19. "Path Through the Forest" (The Factory) – 3:58
20. "Love Hate Revenge" (Episode Six) – 2:55
21. "Pictures of Matchstick Men" (Status Quo) – 3:11
22. "The Train to Disaster" (The Voice) – 2:49
23. "Sad" (The Playboys) – 2:55
24. "Slaves Time" (The Slaves) – 2:22
25. "You Can Be My Baby [single version]" (The Red Squares) – 2:18
26. "I Wish I Was Five" (Scrugg) – 3:19
27. "Glendora" (Downliners Sect) – 2:44

=== Disc four ===
1. "Rosalyn" (The Pretty Things) – 2:21
2. "Come On" (The Atlantics) – 2:55
3. "The Madman Running Through the Fields" (Dantalian's Chariot) – 4:11
4. "How Does It Feel to Feel [US single version]" (The Creation) – 3:08
5. "I'm Just a Mops" (The Mops) – 2:58
6. "Why Don't You Smile Now" (Downliners Sect) – 2:08
7. "Nothin'" (The Ugly Ducklings) – 2:27
8. "Break It All [US single version]" (Los Shakers) – 2:22
9. "The Bitter Thoughts of Little Jane" (Tymon Dogg) – 2:20
10. "Touch" (The Outsiders) – 3:13
11. "Vacuum Cleaner" (Tintern Abbey) – 3:06
12. "My Life" (Thor's Hammer) – 2:20
13. "Bad Little Woman" (The Wheels) – 2:50
14. "No Presents for Me" (The Pandamonium) – 2:52
15. "Bat Macumba" (Os Mutantes) – 3:08
16. "Real Crazy Apartment" (Winston's Fumbs) – 2:52
17. "No More Now" (The Smoke) – 2:12
18. "No Good Without You" (The Birds) – 2:40
19. "Kicks and Chicks" (The Zipps) – 3:14
20. "Dance Around the Maypole" (Acid Gallery) – 2:41
21. "Get Yourself Home" (The Fairies) – 2:28
22. "I'm Your Witchdoctor" (Chants R&B) – 2:04
23. "But You'll Never Do It Babe" (The Boots) – 2:32
24. "One Third" (The Majority) – 2:17
25. "Flight from Ashiya" (Kaleidoscope) – 2:40
26. "Here Come the Nice" (Small Faces) – 2:58
27. "It's My Fault" (The Rattles) – 2:08
28. "When the Alarm Clock Rings" (Blossom Toes) – 2:16

== Credits ==
- Art Direction, Front Cover Artwork Design by – Sevie Bates
- Compilation Producer of Boxed Set by – Alec Palao, Gary Stewart
- Liner Notes (Discographical Annotations) by – Mike Stax, Alec Palao, Gary Peterson
- Other (A & R editorial coordination) by – Shawn Amos
- Other (Creative Director) by – Hugh Brown
- Other (Licensing) by – Jordan Rich, Wendi Cartwright
- Other (Spiritual Guidance) by – Jac Holzman, Lenny Kaye
- Producer (Sound Produced) by – Bill Inglot
- Remastered by – Bill Inglot, Dan Hersch
- Editorial Research by – Daniel Goldmark
- (Editorial supervision) supervised by – Sheryl Farber
- (Project supervision) supervised by – Patrick Milligan
- (The "nuggets" compilation / consultation team) supervised by – Alec Palao, Andrew Sandoval, Andy Zax, Bill Inglot, Danny Benair, Gary Stewart, Geoffrey Weiss, John Hagelston, Michael Johnson, Mike Stax
