= A-Square (Of Course): The Story of Michigan's Legendary A-Square Records =

Compilation album
- Released: April 29, 2008
- Recorded: 1960s
- Genres: Garage rock; acid rock; psychedelic; proto-punk; hard rock
- Length: 1:13:08
- Label: Big Beat

A-Square (Of Course): The Story of Michigan's Legendary A-Square Records is a collection of garage rock songs originally recorded in the 1960s for the Ann Arbor, Michigan-based A-Square label, which has been compiled for this release by Big Beat Records. Michigan had one of the most active garage rock scenes in the country and Jeep Holland was one of its prime movers, as the owner of one of the city's most premier record stores and founder/proprietor of the A-squared label. This collection focuses on the pivotal period in the later half of 1960s as garage rock began encompass psychedelic influences and gravitate towards heavier sounds, typified by groups such as MC5, two of whose pre-Elektra songs are showcased here. All of the tracks are taken off of source tapes from A-Square's vaults. Noted rock journalist Alec Palao compiled the set and wrote its liner notes.

The Scot Richard Case (later known as SRC) showcased Scott Richardson's considerable vocal talents and are featured on five tracks, including the opening cut, Skip James's "I'm So Glad", which had recently been popularized by Cream, as well as covers of the Pretty Things' "Get the Picture," "Midnight to Six Man". MC5 do "Looking at You" and "Borderline"—neither of which was actually released on A-Square. The group's manager, John Sinclair, had the A-Square label surreptitiously printed onto MC5's self-released 1968 single. The Thyme are featured on eight songs here, including "Window Song," "Love to Love" and "Very Last Day". Dick Wagner, who later went on to work with proto-punk icons such as Alice Cooper and Lou Reed, was first in the Bossmen, whose ranks also included Mark Farner—they do three Wagner-penned numbers "Listen My Girl", "I Cannot Stop You", which was also covered by the Cherry Slush, and "Easy Way Out"—which was also recorded by Tonto and the Renegades for a single produced by Wagner. "Mystery Man" is by Wagner's later group, the Frost. James Osterberg, later known as Iggy Pop in the Stooges fame, sings and plays drums in the Prime Movers' version of Bo Diddley's "I'm a Man". The Up's "Just Like an Aborigine" celebrates the kind of radical primitivist ethos adopted by many hippies and radicals in the late 60s. The guitar riff in Half-Life's "Get Down", recorded in 1969 shares an uncanny resemblance to Black Sabbath's 1971 "Paranoid", which has led some to speculate that the riff was lifted by Tony Iommi.

== Track listing ==
1. The Scott Richard Case: "I'm So Glad" (Skip James) 2:52
2. MC5: "Looking at You" (Frederick "Freddy" Smith/Dennis Thompson/Rob Tyner) 2:50
3. The Thyme: "Somehow" 2:50
4. The Apostles: "Stranded in the Jungle" (Ernestine Smith) 3:13
5. The Scott Richard Case: "Get the Picture" (Phil May) 2:14
6. The Thyme: No Opportunity Necessary, No Experience Needed (Richie Havens) 2:58
7. The Rain: "She Is a Friend" 3:10
8. The Bossmen: "Easy Way Out" (Dick Wagner) 2:13
9. The Thyme: "Time of the Season" (Rod Argent) 2:44
10. The Scott Richard Case: "Midnight to Six Man" (Dick Taylor and Phil May) 2:18
11. The Apostles: "Tired of Waiting for You" (Ray Davies) 3:03
12. MC5: "Borderline" (Frederick "Freddy" Smith/Dennis Thompson/Rob Tyner) 3:19
13. The Thyme: "I Found You" 3:00
14. The Scott Richard Case: "Who Is That Girl" (Steve Lyman/Scott Richardson) 2:52
15. Half-Life: "Get Down" (Randy Jarrard/Jim Nash/Mark Ode/Bob Pierson) 2:32
16. The Prime Movers: "I'm a Man" (Bo Diddley|Ellas McDaniel) 3:54
17. The Thyme: "Love to Love" (Neil Diamond) 2:12
18. The Up: "Just Like an Aborigine" (Scott Bailey/Bob Rasmussen/Gary Rasmussen) 4:18
19. The Bossmen: "I Cannot Stop You" (Dick Wagner) 2:43
20. The Thyme: "Very Last Day" (Peter Yarrow) 3:10
21. The Scott Richard Case: "Cobwebs and Strange" (Tony Crombie/Keith Moon) 2:36
22. The Bossmen: Listen My Girl (Dick Wagner) 2:28
23. The Thyme: "Window Song" (Ralph Cole) 3:09
24. The Frost: "Mystery Man" (w/ Dick Wagner) (Dick Wagner) 3:36
25. The Thyme: "I Found a Love" (Cat Stevens) 2:54
