= John Stax =

British musician (born 1944)

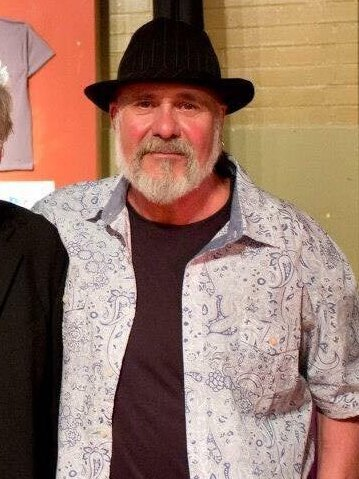
- Stax in Melbourne, Australia (c. 2018)

Background information
- Also known as: John Stax
- Born: John Edward Lee Fullagar; 6 April 1944 (age 82); Crayford, Kent, England
- Genres: Rock and roll; blues
- Occupations: musician; luthier
- Instruments: Bass; harmonica
- Years active: 1965–
- Website: http://cigarboxguitar.com.au

John Edward Lee Fullagar (born 6 April 1944), known professionally as John Stax, is an English musician best known as original bassist for the Pretty Things.

He was born in Crayford, Kent in 1944. He adopted the name "Stax" because of his fondness for the music produced by Stax Records. Stax played on all of the Pretty Things charting singles, which included "Rosalyn," "Don't Bring Me Down," "Midnight to Six Man," "Road Runner," "Honey I Need", and "Cry to Me." He also frequently contributed backing vocals as well as playing harmonica. He played on the Pretty Things' first three albums: The Pretty Things, Get the Picture? and Emotions, although his exact contributions to the latter are unknown. He also played on the band's first two EPs, The Pretty Things and "Rainin' in My Heart". He was part of The Pretty Things infamous tour of New Zealand in 1965. Stax left the band in January 1967, a month after rhythm guitarist Brian Pendleton. Stax then emigrated to Australia in 1970 where he currently resides.

Stax currently builds and sells cigar box guitars. He rejoined the Pretty Things on their 2012 Australian tour, taking the stage on a couple of songs to play bass guitar and harmonica and also guested for a song on their 2018 Farewell Tour in Melbourne.

Stax also played with Melbourne R&B 'supergroup' Blues Hangover, which featured Dave Hogan (vocals, harp), Warren Rough (guitar) and Ken Farmer (drums; all from The Paramount Trio) plus Peter Wells (Rose Tattoo) and Lucy De Soto. The band issued two albums issued on the Dog Meat label, Blues Hangover (1995) and Roadrunner (1996).
