= Come See Me (The Pretty Things song) =

- German release picture sleeve

Single by The Pretty Things

from the album Get the Picture?
- B-side: "£.s.d"
- Released: 22 April 1966
- Genre: R&B; garage rock
- Length: 2:39
- Label: Fontana Records
- Songwriters: J. J. Jackson; Pierre Tubbs; Sidney Barnes
- Producer: Glyn Johns

The Pretty Things singles chronology
"Midnight to Six Man" (1965)	"Come See Me" (1966)	"A House in the Country" (1966)

"Come See Me" (also known as "I'm Your Man") is a 1966 song by The Pretty Things on Fontana Records. It was written by J.J. Jackson, Pierre Tubbs and Sidney Barnes. The song featured prominent fuzz guitar, charting at number 43 in the UK and number 36 in the Netherlands.

The B-side was a concert favorite titled "£.s.d", featuring the chorus lyrics "yes I need L.S.D." The title was a play on abbreviations for pounds, shillings and pence, intended to disguise its true subject matter; Phil May would admit later that the song was about LSD. The BBC played it for a little while until they realized what it was really about, whereupon they placed a ban on it. The song was reissued titled as "LSD" on the CD reissue of the album Get the Picture?. The song was covered by UK garage punk band the Cannibals in 1983.
