= Easy Way Out =

Easy Way Out may refer to:

== Music ==
- Easy Way Out, a 2012 album by Mariama

=== Songs ===
- "Easy Way Out" (Elliott Smith song), 2000
- "Easy Way Out", by Gotye from Making Mirrors, 2011
- "Easy Way Out", by Charlotte Church from Tissues and Issues (2005)
- "Easy Way Out", by the Bossmen, included in the 2008 compilation album A-Square (Of Course): The Story of Michigan's Legendary A-Square Records
- "Easy Way Out", by Sylver from Sacrifice (2009)
- "Easy Way Out", by Low Roar from 0 (2014)
- "Easy Way Out", by Ray Wilson and The Veterans (2015)
- "Easy Way Out", by Roosevelt from Polydans (2021)

== Literature ==
- The Easy Way Out, a 1992 novel by American author Stephen McCauley
- Easy Way Out, a 2016 novel by Australian author Steven Amsterdam

== Other uses ==
- The Easy Way Out, a 2014 French film
- A euphemism referring to suicide.

== See also ==
- No Easy Way Out (disambiguation)
