= Rainin' in My Heart =

Rainin' in My Heart may refer to:

- "Rainin' in My Heart" (song), 1961 R&B song by Slim Harpo and Jerry West
- Rainin' in My Heart (EP), 1965 extended play by the English rock band Pretty Things

== See also ==
- "Raining in My Heart", 1958 Buddy Holly song, written by Felice Bryant and Boudleaux Bryant
