= Pin Ups =

1973 studio album by David Bowie

Studio album by David Bowie
- Released: 19 October 1973
- Recorded: July–August 1973
- Studio: Château d'Hérouville (Hérouville)
- Genres: Glam rock; proto-punk
- Length: 33:42
- Label: RCA Victor
- Producers: Ken Scott; David Bowie

David Bowie chronology
Aladdin Sane (1973)	Pin Ups (1973)	Diamond Dogs (1974)

Singles from Pinups
- 1. "Sorrow" Released: 12 October 1973

Pin Ups (also referred to as Pinups and Pin-Ups) (Note: An insert included with the original LP has the text "This album is called Pinups" and the title is written as one word, without a hyphen, on the LP cover and spine, although the original UK disc label spells the title with a hyphen.) is the seventh studio album by the English musician David Bowie, released on 19 October 1973 through RCA Records. Devised as a "stop-gap" album to appease his record label, it is a covers album, featuring glam rock and proto-punk versions of songs by 1960s bands who were influential on Bowie as a teenager, including the Pretty Things, the Who, the Yardbirds and Pink Floyd.

The album was recorded from July to August 1973 at the Château d'Hérouville in Hérouville, France, following the completion of the Ziggy Stardust Tour. It was Bowie's final album co-produced with Ken Scott. Two members of the Spiders from Mars backing band contributed, Mick Ronson on guitar and Trevor Bolder on bass, while Mick Woodmansey was replaced by Aynsley Dunbar on drums. Following a surprise announcement at the end of the tour that the Spiders were breaking up, tensions were high during the sessions, which was reflected in the tracks. The album cover, featuring Bowie and the 1960s supermodel Twiggy, was taken in Paris and originally intended for the cover of British Vogue magazine.

Released only six months after Aladdin Sane and preceded by a cover of the Merseys' song "Sorrow" (Note: "Sorrow" was originally recorded by the American rock band the McCoys in 1965 as the B-side to their single "Fever". Bowie based his version on a cover by the British band the Merseys, whose version reached number four on the UK singles chart in 1966.) as the lead single, Pin Ups was a commercial success, topping the UK Albums Chart, but received negative reviews from critics, who criticised the songs as generally inferior to the originals. Retrospective reviewers have described it as uneven, while others believe it had a good premise but suffered from poor execution. Bowie's biographers have noted it as an experiment in nostalgia. Some publications have regarded it as one of the best cover albums. It has been reissued numerous times and was remastered in 2015 as part of the box set Five Years (1969–1973).

== Background ==
By 1973, David Bowie was at his commercial peak. At the end of July, five of his six albums were in the top 40 and three were in the top 15. Bowie's most recent LP, Aladdin Sane, came out in April, but his label, RCA Records, wanted a new album by Christmas. Having just completed the Ziggy Stardust Tour, Bowie was exhausted from the extensive touring schedule. His manager at the time, Tony Defries, was negotiating for larger royalties with Bowie's music publisher and recommended he not record any new compositions until negotiations were finished. Although he had intended his next project to be an adaptation of George Orwell's novel Nineteen Eighty-Four (1949), he devised a record of cover versions as a "stopgap" album.

On the final date of the tour, 3 July, Bowie unexpectedly announced that "this is the last show we'll ever do". (Note: Later understood to mean that Bowie was retiring the Ziggy Stardust character.) The announcement drove a wedge between Bowie and his backing band, the Spiders from Mars – Mick Ronson (guitar), Trevor Bolder (bass) and Woody Woodmansey (drums) – specifically Bolder and Woodmansey, who were unaware of the announcement in advance. The two were also unhappy upon discovering the pianist Mike Garson, who joined the tour after Aladdin Sane, was being paid more than them. Shortly after the tour's end, Woodmansey was fired by Garson over a phone call. To record the covers album, Bowie brought back Garson, Ronson and the Aladdin Sane players Ken Fordham and Geoffrey MacCormack. The session drummer Aynsley Dunbar replaced Woodmansey and Bolder returned after Jack Bruce of the band Cream declined.

== Production ==
=== Composition ===
Pin Ups was Bowie's tribute to bands that had inspired him as a teenager. Bowie later explained: "These are all bands which I used to go and hear play down the Marquee between 1964 and 1967. I've got all these records back at home." According to the biographer Chris O'Leary, he chose the tracks by "going through a stack of 45s in his rooms at the Hyde Park Hotel before leaving for France". The musician Scott Richardson, a Pretty Things fan, convinced Bowie to cover two of their songs. Other artists selected included the Yardbirds, the Kinks, Pink Floyd and the Who. The final tracklist includes the Pretty Things' "Rosalyn" and "Don't Bring Me Down", Them's "Here Comes the Night", Pink Floyd's "See Emily Play", the Mojos' "Everything's Alright", the Yardbirds' "Shapes of Things" and their rendition of Billy Boy Arnold's "I Wish You Would", the Easybeats' "Friday on My Mind", the Merseys' "Sorrow", the Who's "I Can't Explain" and "Anyway, Anyhow, Anywhere", and the Kinks' "Where Have All the Good Times Gone". Bowie had also considered re-recording his 1966 single "The London Boys" but the idea was discarded.

The songs on Pin Ups feature the same arrangements as the originals, albeit performed in glam rock and proto-punk styles. Regarding this, Bowie explained: "We just took down the basic chord structures and worked from there ... Some of them don't even need any working on – like 'Rosalyn' for example. But most of the arranging I have done by myself and Mick, and Aynsley too." According to the author Peter Doggett, only two tracks, "I Wish You Would" and "See Emily Play", varied the arrangements from the originals.

=== Recording ===
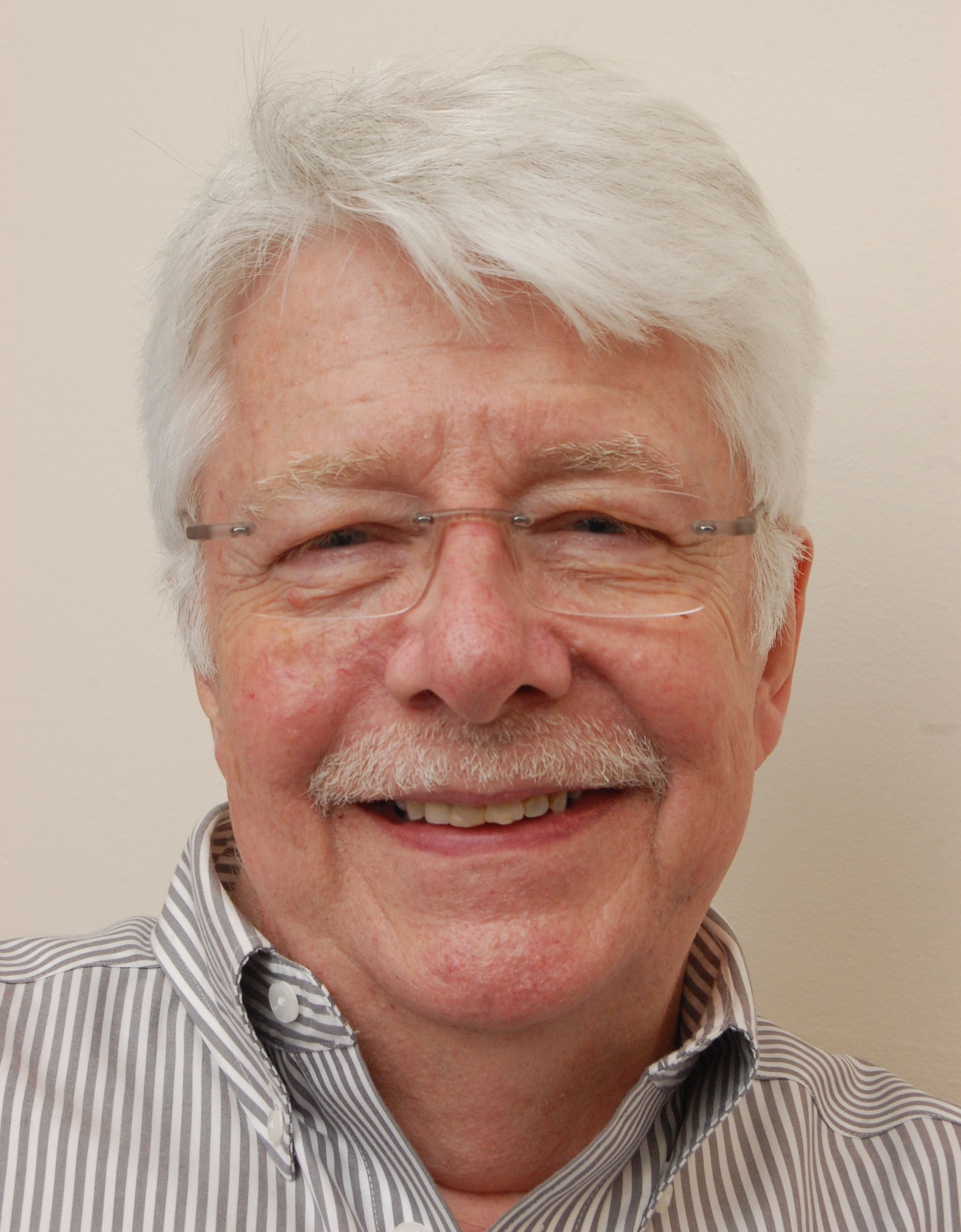
Pin Ups was the final collaboration between Bowie and producer Ken Scott (pictured in 2014).

Pin Ups was recorded at the Château d'Hérouville in Hérouville, France, in sessions lasting for three weeks from July to August 1973. The venue was chosen after being recommended by Marc Bolan, whose band T. Rex who had just recorded Tanx there. (Note: The Château had also become popularised after Elton John recorded his 1972 album Honky Château there, an album that was engineered by Ken Scott shortly after finishing Ziggy Stardust (1972).) It was co-produced by Bowie and Ken Scott and marked the final collaboration between the two. According to O'Leary, rehearsing consisted of playing the band the original track a few times before recording began. Tensions were high during the sessions. Bolder, believing he was unwanted, recorded his bass parts quickly and left. Richardson recalled Ronson overworking himself: "He did everything in the studio, he tuned everybody's instruments, he worked on all the arrangements ... [he had] a tremendous burden on him;" he also grew wary of his future after the collapse of the Spiders. Scott was facing personal issues on top of pressure from his management company to leave over MainMan not paying him royalties, while Bowie had, in O'Leary's words, an "increasingly remote and truculent attitude in the studio".

A version of the Velvet Underground's "White Light/White Heat" was recorded during the sessions but went unreleased; Bowie donated the backing track to Ronson for his 1975 solo album Play Don't Worry. The Beach Boys' "God Only Knows" was also attempted during the sessions, but was left abandoned. (Note: Bowie later covered it for the aborted Astronettes project in October 1973, while he officially covered it for Tonight (1984).) The sessions were put on hold in mid-July for the recording of the Scottish singer Lulu's covers of Bowie's tracks "Watch That Man" and "The Man Who Sold the World". The Pin Ups personnel contributed to the recording.

Pin Ups was the first of two "1960s nostalgia" albums that Bowie had planned to release. The second would have contained Bowie covering his favourite American artists, but was never recorded. Rumoured tracks to have appeared for the project include the Stooges' "No Fun", the Lovin' Spoonful's "Summer in the City" and Roxy Music's "Ladytron". Bowie also considered making a Pin Ups sequel: he had compiled a list of songs he wanted to cover, some of which showed up on his later releases of Heathen (2002) and Reality (2003).

== Artwork and packaging ==
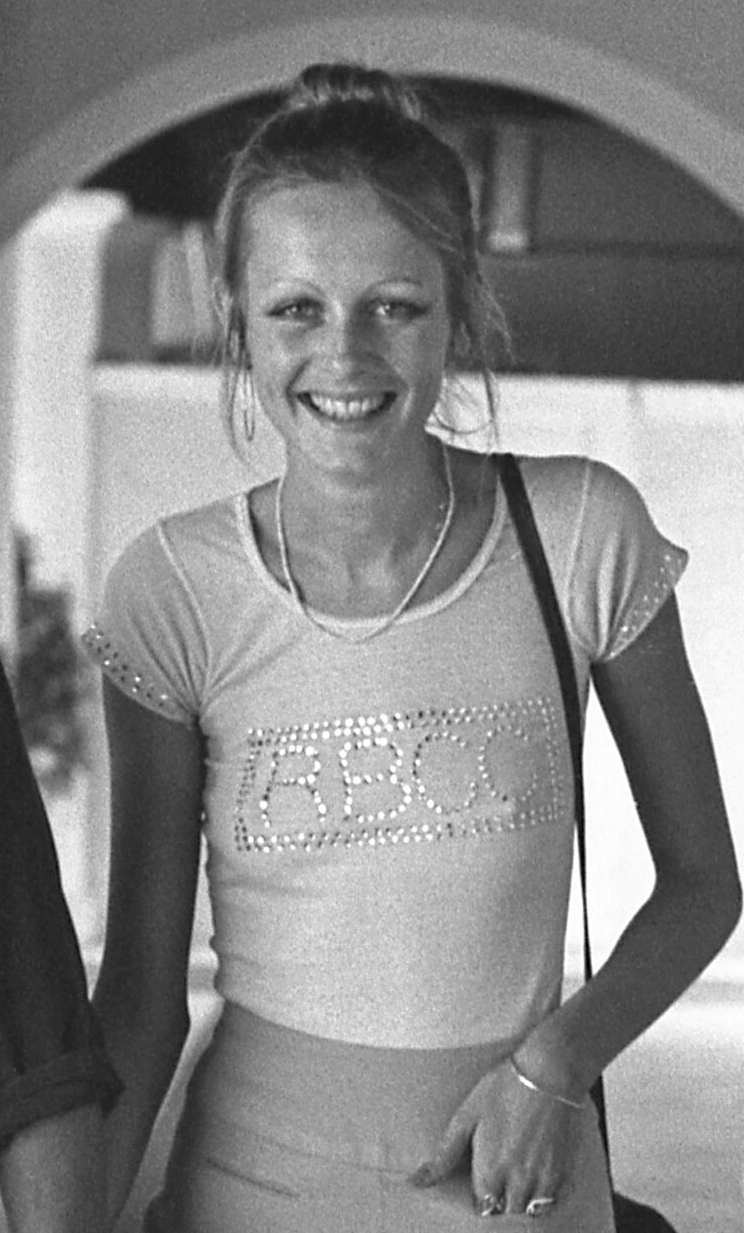
English model Twiggy (pictured in 1973) appears on the cover of Pin Ups with Bowie.

The cover photo for Pin Ups reflected the theme of swinging London by featuring the 1960s supermodel Twiggy, who had previously been name-checked on Aladdin Sane's "Drive-In Saturday" as "Twig the Wonder Kid". The photo was taken midway through the recording sessions at a Paris studio by Twiggy's then-manager and partner Justin de Villeneuve; he recalled in 2010: "Twiggy and I had first heard David mention her on Aladdin Sane ... We loved the album so much I called David and asked him if he would like to do a shoot with Twiggy. He jumped at the idea." Twiggy recalled in her autobiography In Black and White that she was "really quite nervous" meeting Bowie, but "he immediately put me at ease. He was everything I could have hoped for and more". During the shoot, Bowie and Twiggy had different skin tones, which Aladdin Sane make-up designer Pierre Laroche balanced out using make-up masks. Twiggy found the final result "enigmatic and strange", later calling it one of her favourite images and "possibly the most widely distributed photograph ever taken of me". The photo was originally slated to appear in Vogue magazine, although they did not want a man appearing on their front cover, so Bowie opted to use it as the album cover instead; de Villeneuve later recalled Vogue being infuriated by the decision.

The original LP's rear sleeve featured two photos by the photographer Mick Rock, one of a concert shot from the Ziggy tour and another of Bowie wearing a double-breasted suit cradling a saxophone. Bowie wrote in the book Moonage Daydream: "I chose the performance photos for the back cover as they were favourite Rock shots of mine. I also did the back cover layout with the colour combination of red writing on blue as it again hinted at Sixties psychedelia." A discarded idea for the sleeve came from photographer Alan Motz, who "wanted to shoot Bowie metamorphosing into an animal". This idea was used for Bowie's next album, Diamond Dogs (1974).

== Release ==
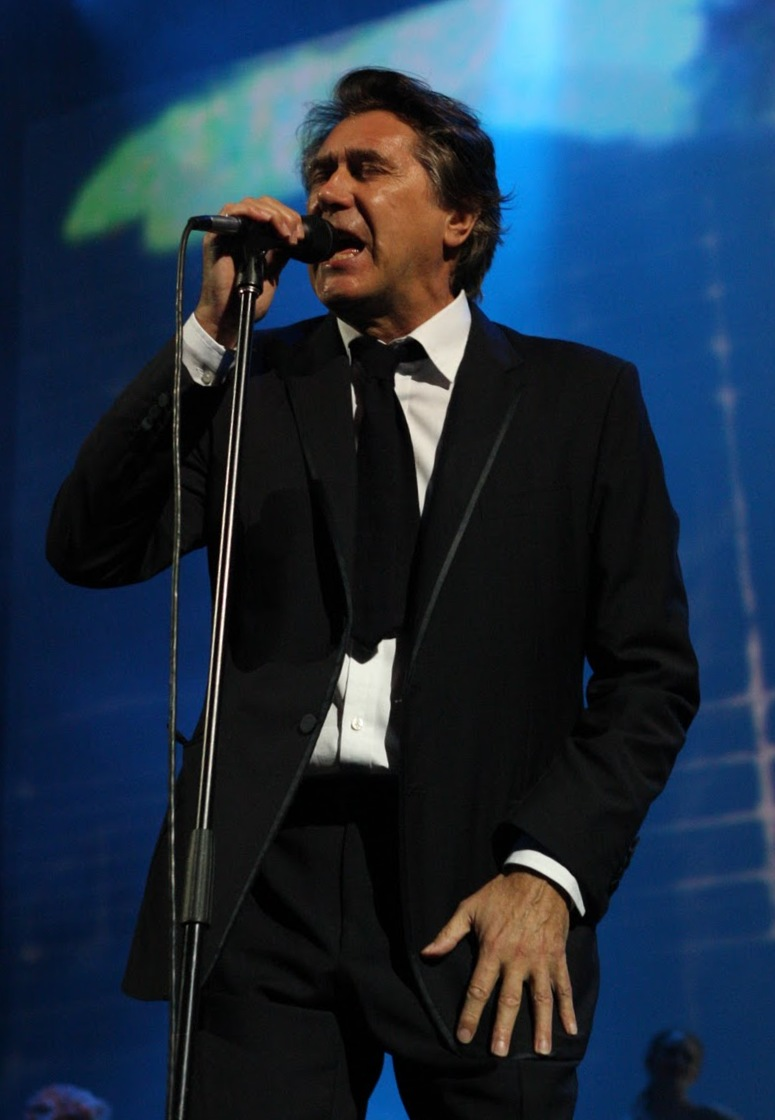
The album's release coincided with another covers album, These Foolish Things by Bryan Ferry (pictured in 2012).

RCA issued the lead single "Sorrow", featuring a cover of Jacques Brel's "Amsterdam" as the B-side, on 12 October 1973; it had been delayed from its original release date of 28 September. The single was a commercial success, peaking at number three on the UK Singles Chart and stayed on the chart for 15 weeks, becoming one of his biggest hits. Pin Ups followed suit a week later on 19 October, issued with the catalogue number RS 1003, only six months after his previous album Aladdin Sane. On the album sleeve, Bowie was simply referred to as "Bowie". In America, the advertising campaign read: "Pin Ups means favourites, and these are Bowie's favourite songs. It's the kind of music your parents will never let you play loud enough!"

The album's release coincided with Roxy Music singer Bryan Ferry's covers album These Foolish Things. As Ferry had recorded his album weeks before Bowie began work on Pin Ups, Ferry was annoyed at the perceived copying of his project, calling it a "rip-off". According to Sandford, he allegedly went to his label Island Records to request they file an injunction to prevent Pin Ups from being released before These Foolish Things. Instead, O'Leary writes that Bowie phoned Ferry to inform him of Pin Ups and requested permission to record a Roxy Music song. Ferry later told biographer David Buckley, "At first I was a bit apprehensive, but Bowie's record turned out to be very different. I myself was always very anxious to be different from other people ... and to forge my own furrow." In the event, both albums were released as planned and charted on the same day, 3 November 1973.

=== Commercial performance ===
In the UK, Pin Ups came at the height of Bowie's popularity there. The album had advance copies of 150,000, which was 50,000 more than Aladdin Sane. Upon release, it spent 39 weeks on the UK Albums Chart and peaked at number one, remaining there for five weeks, matching the performance of Aladdin Sane. It brought the total number of Bowie albums concurrently on the UK chart to six. In the US, the album peaked at number 23 on the Billboard Top LPs & Tape chart and remained on the chart for 21 weeks. O'Leary writes that Pin Ups was essentially a "new Bowie album" in America since only three of the original tracks that were released as singles had reached the top 40.

Pin Ups was also a commercial success elsewhere. It topped the Sverigetopplistan chart in Sweden, and reached number three in Spain, four in Australia and Finland, six in Brazil and the Netherlands, seven in Italy, and eight in Norway and Yugoslavia. Sandford writes that by Christmas 1973, the album was selling 30,000 copies a week. Upon release of the massive commercially successful Let's Dance (1983), Pin Ups returned to the UK chart again, peaking at number 57.

== Critical reception ==
Pin Ups received mostly negative reviews from music critics on release, with many criticising the songs as generally inferior to their original counterparts. In Rolling Stone, Greg Shaw believed that all the tracks were underproduced and Bowie's vocal performance was the album's "true failure", further saying his "excessively mannered voice" was "a ridiculously weak mismatch for the material" and that they were mixed too high to give the tracks the "edge" or "punch" they need to be effective. He concludes his review by saying, "While Pin Ups may be a failure, it is also a collection of great songs, most of which are given a more than adequate, and always loving, treatment. Maybe the fairest conclusion to draw is that Bowie can't sing any other way, did the best he could, and the result isn't all that bad." In the NME, Ian MacDonald felt that by not differentiating the songs from the originals, the renditions lack value, ultimately stating the record failed to live up to expectations and predicted that "unless he puts a banger under his own behind, I can foresee nothing but artistic frustration for Bowie in the next few years." Loraine Alterman of The New York Times was also negative, saying the album "suffers from too much style and technique and not enough musical substance".

Discussing Pin Ups as a whole, Record Mirror found the album "unsatisfying, too cluttered musically and over-produced". A writer for Sounds magazine also reacted negatively, declaring that Bowie "used R&B as a prop, not a springboard". In Christgau's Record Guide, veteran critic Robert Christgau found the idea of the record good, but its overall execution subpar. On the other hand, Billboard responded positively, stating that, "there's humor in this music if you want to take it as a look back in musical time." Robert Hilburn was also positive in the Los Angeles Times. Describing it as a "light, unpretentious, high-spirited album", he hailed Pin Ups as "one of the year's most inviting albums" and one that deserved special attention.

== Legacy ==
Professional ratings
Review scores
Source	Rating
AllMusic	3/5 stars
Christgau's Record Guide	B−
The Encyclopedia of Popular Music	3/5 stars
MusicHound Rock	3/5 stars
New Musical Express	9/10
Pitchfork	5.9/10
The Rolling Stone Album Guide	2/5 stars
Select	2/5
Spin Alternative Record Guide	4/10

Pin Ups continues to receive mixed reactions in later decades. When reviewing the album as part of the 2015 box set Five Years (1969–1973), Pitchfork's Douglas Wolk was unfavorable. He cited sloppy execution and the overall idea "more interesting in theory", believing that all the originals were "vastly" superior and Bowie added nothing interesting to any of them. He further believed that it did not help that the Spiders from Mars were falling apart when recording it. Bruce Eder of AllMusic similarly found the album to be out of place with Bowie's output up to that point. He continued, "Ziggy Stardust and Aladdin Sane had established Bowie as perhaps the most fiercely original of all England's glam rockers, so an album of covers didn't make any sense and was especially confusing for American fans", further criticising the song choices as unknown. Eder did praise Bowie's cover of "Sorrow" as a "distinct improvement" over the original. More positively, Dave Thompson called Pin Ups "the underrated classic in David Bowie's glam-era crown".

Bowie's biographers have given Pin Ups mixed reactions. Buckley describes it as "uneven but beloved by many". O'Leary attributes its "scattershot feel" and "lack of a coherent style" to the dysfunctional nature of its recording, while Sandford acknowledges the album's lack of originality in the song arrangements. Doggett calls Pin Ups "an exercise in Pop Art", meaning it was "a reproduction and interpretation of work by [another artist], intended for a mass audience". James E. Perone, on the other hand, argues that Pin Ups predated the release of covers albums by other English artists, such as John Lennon with Rock 'n' Roll (1975) and Elvis Costello with Almost Blue (1981) and Kojak Variety (1995). Perone also recognises the album's musical influence, stating that Bowie's version of "Here Comes the Night" was a forerunner in the post-punk and new wave sound of the late 1970s and early 1980s, presaging songs such as Culture Club's "Karma Chameleon" (1983). He contests that "Here Comes the Night" foreshadowed the soul oriented directions of Young Americans (1975) and Station to Station (1976), while "See Emily Play" evokes the avant-garde experimentations of Bowie's late 1970s Berlin Trilogy.

Being a collection of cover versions, it will never have the compelling allure of [Bowie's] other 1970s work, but [Pin Ups] remains a superb, energetic and greatly underrated throwaway, showcasing a band of musicians operating at the height of their powers.

— Nicholas Pegg, 2016

Some biographers have analysed the album as an experiment in nostalgia, which Doggett states "was already emerging as one of the dominant themes of the early seventies". Pegg writes that "it remains perhaps glam rock's most cogent expression of its own inherent nostalgia, an affectionate reminder of the process that had led to the charts of 1973." Buckley states that the album "began an era of pop archeology" and that it "came at a time of uncertainty, a time when many cast backward glances as pop entered its first retroactive phase". In the Spin Alternative Record Guide, the critic Rob Sheffield agreed, characterising the album's "Swinging London oldies" as "atrophied nostalgia".

In 2013, in a ranking of Bowie's albums up to that point, Gabriela Claymore of Stereogum placed Pin Ups at number 18 (out of 25), calling it "The only one of Bowie's '70s records you can safely call 'inessential'. She felt it was out of place coming off of Aladdin Sane, but stated, "For what it is, it's quite good". Following Bowie's death in 2016, Bryan Wawzenek of Ultimate Classic Rock ranked all of his 26 studio albums from worst to best, placing Pin Ups at number 21. He praised the song choices as "excellent", describing "Sorrow" as the highlight. However, he found that Bowie went "way, way, way over the top" on every other track. He concluded by stating: "In spite of all the effort, Pin Ups remains a slight affair." In the context of Bowie's entire career, Eder views Pin Ups as an artistic statement, in that it represented a "swan song" for the Spiders from Mars and an "interlude" between the first and second phases of his international career, with his next album Diamond Dogs being the end of his glam rock era: "It's not a bad bridge between the two, and it has endured across the decades."

Despite mixed reactions overall, some publications have praised Pin Ups as a covers album, calling it one of the finest in the genre. Pierre Perrone of The Independent and the writers of NME classified Pin Ups as one of the best cover albums in 2013 and 2019, respectively, with the former describing it as "[t]he covers album that launched a thousand copycats." Radio X called it the best covers album ever in 2023. Eder states that today it is still dismissed by many as just another covers album, including Wolk, who in 2015 described it as "quick-and-sloppy".

The American alternative rock band Human Drama imitated Pin Ups for the concept, cover artwork and packaging of their 1993 covers album Pinups.

=== Reissues ===
Pin Ups has been reissued several times, on vinyl and other media. The album was first released on compact disc by RCA in the mid-1980s. In 1990, it was reissued by Rykodisc with two bonus tracks: a cover of Bruce Springsteen's "Growin' Up" (recorded during the sessions for Diamond Dogs and featuring Ronnie Wood on guitar) and "Amsterdam", the B-side to "Sorrow". This reissue charted at number 52 on the UK Albums Chart for one week in July 1990. It was remastered in 1999 by Peter Mew at Abbey Road Studios for EMI and Virgin Records, and issued on CD with no bonus tracks. It was again remastered in 2015 for inclusion on the box set Five Years 1969–1973 by Parlophone and rereleased separately, in 2015–2016, in CD, vinyl and digital formats. Pin Ups was reissued as a limited edition half-speed mastered LP to celebrate its 50th anniversary on 20 October 2023.

== Track listing ==
Side one
No.	Title	Writer(s)	Originally performed by	Length
1.	"Rosalyn"	Jimmy Duncan; Bill Farley	The Pretty Things	2:27
2.	"Here Comes the Night"	Bert Berns	Them	3:09
3.	"I Wish You Would"	Billy Boy Arnold	The Yardbirds	2:40
4.	"See Emily Play"	Syd Barrett	Pink Floyd	4:03
5.	"Everything's Alright"	Nicky Crouch; John Konrad; Simon Stavely; Stuart James; Keith Karlson	The Mojos	2:26
6.	"I Can't Explain"	Pete Townshend	The Who	2:07

Side two
No.	Title	Writer(s)	Originally performed by	Length
1.	"Friday on My Mind"	George Young; Harry Vanda	The Easybeats	3:18
2.	"Sorrow"	Bob Feldman; Jerry Goldstein; Richard Gottehrer	The Merseys	2:48
3.	"Don't Bring Me Down"	Johnnie Dee	The Pretty Things	2:01
4.	"Shapes of Things"	Paul Samwell-Smith; Jim McCarty; Keith Relf	The Yardbirds	2:47
5.	"Anyway, Anyhow, Anywhere"	Roger Daltrey; Townshend	The Who	3:04
6.	"Where Have All the Good Times Gone"	Ray Davies	The Kinks	2:35

== Personnel ==
Album credits per the Pin Ups liner notes and biographer Nicholas Pegg.

- David Bowie – vocals, guitar, tenor and alto saxophone, harmonica, arrangements, backing vocals, Moog synthesiser
- Mick Ronson – guitar, piano, vocals, arrangements
- Trevor Bolder – bass guitar
- Aynsley Dunbar – drums
- Mike Garson – piano, organ, harpsichord, electric piano
- Ken Fordham – baritone saxophone
- G. A. MacCormack – backing vocals

Production

- David Bowie – producer
- Ken Scott – producer
- Dennis MacKay – engineer
- Andy Scott – engineer

== Charts and certifications ==
=== Weekly charts ===
1973–74 weekly chart performance for Pin Ups
Chart (1973–74)	Peak Position
Australian Albums (Kent Music Report)	4
Brazil (Brazil Albums Chart)	6
Dutch Albums (Album Top 100)	6
Finnish Albums (Suomen virallinen lista)	4
Italian Albums (Musica e dischi)	7
Spanish Albums (Promusicae)	3
Norwegian Albums (VG-lista)	8
Swedish Albums (Sverigetopplistan)	1
UK Albums (Official Charts)	1
US Billboard Top LPs & Tape	23
Yugoslavian Albums (Radio TV Revue & Studio)	8

1990 weekly chart performance for Pin Ups
Chart (1990)	Peak Position
UK Albums (OCC)	52

2016 weekly chart performance for Pin Ups
Chart (2016)	Peak Position
French Albums (SNEP)	191

2023 weekly chart performance for Pin Ups
Chart (2023)	Peak Position
Hungarian Physical Albums (MAHASZ)	24

=== Year-end charts ===
1974 year-end chart performance for Pin Ups
Chart (1974)	Position
Australian Albums (Kent Music Report)	12

=== Certifications ===
Sales and certifications for Pin Ups
Region	Certification	Certified units/sales
Australia (ARIA)	Gold	20,000^{^}
United Kingdom (BPI)	Gold	1,000,000
Summaries
Worldwide	—	3,400,000
^{^} Shipments figures based on certification alone.
