= The Pretty Things (album) =

Studio album by Pretty Things
- Released: March 12, 1965
- Genre: Garage rock; rhythm and blues
- Length: 35:29
- Label: Fontana
- Producer: Bobby Graham

Pretty Things chronology
The Pretty Things (1965)	Rainin' in My Heart (1965)

Singles from The Pretty Things
- 1. "Rosalyn" Released: May 1964; 2. "Don't Bring Me Down" Released: 1964; 3. "Honey I Need" Released: 3 March 1965; 4. "Road Runner" Released: March 1965

The Pretty Things is the self-titled debut album by the English rock band Pretty Things. Released in 1965 in alternate track listings in the United Kingdom and North America, the album demonstrated the band's raw, loud sound, influenced by American rock and roll musician Bo Diddley.

== Recording ==
Fontana Records booked two days worth of recording sessions with Pretty Things for their debut album. 30 minutes into the first recording session, the original producer, Jack Baverstock, the head of the label, quit over the band's behavior and alcoholism, and was subsequently replaced by the more sympathetic Bobby Graham in order to salvage the sessions.

== Composition ==
The band's playing was noted for being exceptionally loud for the time period, with their sound on "Road Runner" being described as being "about as raw and loud as British rock & roll ever got up to that time" by AllMusic.

A third of the album's compositions were written by American blues and rock and roll musician Bo Diddley, and the rest of the album's performances were inspired by his works, with AllMusic saying that the band's cover of Chuck Berry's "Oh, Baby Doll" sounded like it was performed in Bo Diddley's style. "13 Chester Street", a homage to a house that Pretty Things shared with the Rolling Stones' Brian Jones, is musically a cross between the Stones and a lead influenced by Slim Harpo. The album includes a cover of "Pretty Thing", written by Willie Dixon, which the band was named after.

== Release ==
The album was released in 1965 with alternate track listings in the United Kingdom and United States. The US version included the singles "Rosalyn" and Don't Bring Me Down", both of which were covered by self-professed fan of the band David Bowie on his 1973 album Pin Ups. In 2023, all 13 of the band's studio albums (with The Pretty Things being in its UK version) were released in a box set under the title The Complete Studio Albums 1965-2020.

== Reception ==
Professional ratings
Review scores
Source	Rating
Allmusic	4/5 stars
Select	3/5 medals

The album reached number six and spent 10 weeks on the UK Albums Chart in 1965. AllMusic said that the album's raw sound paved the way for garage rock bands like MC5. In a review of The Complete Studio Albums 1965-2020, Mojo said that "May’s lusty Road Runner was a calling card, but the remainder of their self-titled 1965 debut lacks sizzle."

== Track listing ==
UK version

Side A
No.	Title	Writer(s)	Length
1.	"Road Runner"	Ellas McDaniel	3:14
2.	"Judgement Day" (adapted and arranged by the Pretty Things)	Bryan Morrison	2:49
3.	"13 Chester Street"	Phil May; Dick Taylor; John Stax; Brian Pendleton; Viv Prince	2:22
4.	"Big City"	Jimmy Duncan; Alan Klein	2:02
5.	"Unknown Blues"	Phil May; Dick Taylor; John Stax; Brian Pendleton; Viv Prince	3:49
6.	"Mama, Keep Your Big Mouth Shut"	Ellas McDaniel	3:03
Total length:			17:15

Side B
No.	Title	Writer(s)	Length
7.	"Honey, I Need"	Dick Taylor; John Warburton; Peter Leslie Smith; Ian Stirling	2:00
8.	"Oh, Baby Doll"	Chuck Berry	3:01
9.	"She's Fine, She's Mine"	Ellas McDaniel	4:24
10.	"Don't Lie to Me"	Tampa Red	3:53
11.	"The Moon Is Rising"	Jimmy Reed	2:33
12.	"Pretty Thing"	Willie Dixon	1:39
Total length:			17:30

NA version

Side A
No.	Title	Writer(s)	Length
1.	"Honey, I Need"	Dick Taylor; John Warburton; Peter Leslie Smith	1:58
2.	"Rosalyn"	Jimmy Duncan; Bill Farley	2:20
3.	"13 Chester Street"	Phil May; Dick Taylor; John Stax; Brian Pendleton; Viv Prince	2:20
4.	"I Can Never Say"	Phil May; Dick Taylor; John Stax; Brian Pendleton; Viv Prince	3:00
5.	"Unknown Blues"	Phil May; Dick Taylor; John Stax; Brian Pendleton; Viv Prince	2:35
6.	"The Moon Is Rising"	Jimmy Reed	2:30

Side B
No.	Title	Writer(s)	Length
7.	"Don't Bring Me Down"	Johnnie Dee	2:09
8.	"Road Runner"	Ellas McDaniel	3:13
9.	"We'll Be Together"	Phil May; Dick Taylor; John Stax	2:09
10.	"Judgement Day"	Phil May; Dick Taylor; John Stax; Brian Pendleton; Viv Prince	2:45
11.	"Big City"	Jimmy Duncan; Alan Klein	2:30
12.	"Pretty Thing"	Willie Dixon	1:39

== Personnel ==
The Pretty Things

- Phil May – lead vocals, harmonica, percussion
- Dick Taylor – lead guitar
- John Stax – bass guitar, harmonica, backing vocals
- Brian Pendleton – rhythm guitar, bass guitar, backing vocals
- Viv Prince – drums

Additional musicians

- Bobby Graham – drums

== Charts ==
Singles
Year	Single	Chart	Position
1964	"Rosalyn" / "Big Boss Man"	UK	41
1964	"Don't Bring Me Down" / "We'll Be Together"	UK	10
1964	"Don't Bring Me Down" / "We'll Be Together"	CAN	34
1965	"Honey I Need" / "I Can Never Say"	UK	13
