= Pebbles, Volume 6 =

Pebbles, Volume 6 may refer to:

- Pebbles, Volume 6 (1979 album)
- Pebbles, Volume 6 (1994 album)
