= The Cryin' Shames =

English pop/beat group

- Origin: Liverpool, England
- Genre: Freakbeat
- Years active: December 1965 – June 1966
- Label: Decca

The Cryin' Shames were a mid-1960s English freakbeat group produced by Joe Meek. They had one UK hit single in 1966 with a cover of The Drifters' 1961 "Please Stay", written by Burt Bacharach and Bob Hilliard.

== Career ==
The sextet was initially renamed from The Bumblies who were founded by George Robinson in 1963 in Liverpool, and was managed by Norman Eastwood. The Bumblies name came from a television programme starring Michael Bentine. The Bumblies comprised Charlie Crane (vocals), Joey Kneen (vocals), John (Ben) Bennett (guitar), Phil Roberts (keyboards), George Robinson (bass guitar) and Charlie Gallagher (drums).

Roberts and Kneen came from The Calderstones that also featured Tom Evans (Badfinger). After recording their first single, The Bumblies' John (Ben) Bennett was replaced in early December 1965 by the then 16-year-old Ritchie Routledge. Ritchie Routledge did not perform on the record "Please Stay". John (Ben) Bennett was the guitarist on all the Cryin Shames Tea Chest tracks.

The band changed their name to The Cryin' Shames and started working under the new name just before Christmas 1965. The Cryin' Shames' first single, "Please Stay" was released on the Decca label on 18 February 1966. It was destined to be Joe Meek's final chart hit before he committed suicide in 1967 .

"Please Stay" was a minor hit, peaking at #26 in the UK Singles Chart, and the band was approached by Epstein, who wanted to manage them, but they refused. The band had met Epstein in the Adelphi Hotel in Liverpool and turned down his offer.

The line-up changed in May 1966, when Robinson quit the band and was replaced by Derek Cleary on bass, who played on their second single release, "Nobody Waved Goodbye," which was released the following month. Robinson continued in the music business with Katie Peacock a multi instrumentalist, playing the cabaret circuit as Class Of 59.

Crane and Routledge left The Cryin' Shames and formed a new band with a new name. With a line-up of Charlie [Paul] Crane, Ritchie Routledge (both vocals), Brian Norris (bass), Mike Espie (guitar), Pete Byrne (organ) and Paul Commerford (drums), they recorded one more single with Meek, "September in the Rain" / "Come On Back," which was released on 1 September 1966. It was issued under their new name of Paul and Ritchie and The Crying Shames.

Routledge later led Blackwater Park, an English-German band in the early 1970s, and was part of Grimms. He also worked as a session singer for The Scaffold and appeared on the recording of the 1974 song "Liverpool Lou" (UK Number 7, produced by Paul McCartney). Crane went on to be the lead singer of Gary Walker and The Rain. Routledge died in Nashville, Tennessee, on 8 October 2023, at the age of 73.

== Discography ==
=== Singles ===
as The Cryin' Shames

- "Please Stay" (Bacharach, Hilliard) / "What's New Pussycat" (Kneen/Robinson) (Decca F 12340 - February 1966) (UK No. 26 NME) (UK No. 22 Melody Maker)
- "Nobody Waved Goodbye" (Schroeder, Gold, Brooks) / "You" (Cryin' Shames) (Decca F 12425 - June 1966)

as Paul and Ritchie and The Crying Shames

- "September in the Rain" (Warren, Dubin) / "Come on Back" (Crane/Routledge) (Decca F 12483 - September 1966) (UK No. 40 Melody Maker)

=== Compilation albums ===
- The English Freakbeat series included "What's News, Pussycat" by the Cryin' Shames on the English Freakbeat, Volume 5 edition.
- Friendly Persuasion: Please Stay (2024)

== See also ==
- List of bands and artists from Merseyside
