= Honey I Need =

Single by Pretty Things

from the album Pretty Things
- B-side: "I Can Never Say"
- Released: 12 February 1965
- Genre: Rhythm and blues; garage rock
- Length: 2:02
- Songwriter: Dick Taylor
- Producer: Bobby Graham

Pretty Things singles chronology
"Don't Bring Me Down" (1964)	"Honey I Need" (1965)	"Cry to Me" (1965)

"Honey I Need" is a song written by Dick Taylor and first performed by English rock band Pretty Things in 1965. It was first published in 1966 and registered at number 13 in the UK Pretty Things guitarist Dick Taylor wrote the tune, along with a couple of friends who weren't in the band.

== Personnel ==
- Phil May – lead vocals
- Dick Taylor – lead guitar
- Brian Pendleton – rhythm guitar, backing vocals
- John Stax – bass guitar, backing vocals
- Viv Prince – drums

== Influence ==
The poppiest element of the song, and most likely the one that got it to climb the British hit parade, is the insistent, uplifting chorus, which is followed by a typically verging-on-undisciplined, raw bluesy guitar solo. May slightly changes the melody of the verse when he returns after the break, adding a little more urgency to a song that was already plenty propulsive. Ritchie Unterberger of Allmusic noted that "it was those kinds of little clever attentions to subtleties that belied the Pretty Things' image as crude musical louts, lifting them above most of the standard raw British R&B-derived rock groups of the mid-'60s in originality".

== Chart performance ==
Chart (1965)	Peak position
UK Singles Chart	13
Australia Kent Music Report	54
