= Wimple Winch =

English psychedelic pop band

- Origin: Liverpool, England
- Genres: Freakbeat; Psychedelic pop; Merseybeat
- Years active: 1963-1967
- Labels: EMI; Fontana
- Past members: Demetrius "Dee" Christopolus; Larry Arends; John Kelman; Barrie Ashall

Wimple Winch was an English psychedelic pop band that evolved from the group Just Four Men. Originally a Merseybeat act, their individualized sound was personalized by their intricate vocal harmonies and exploratory lyrics. Music historian Vernon Joynson has referred to the band as freakbeat.

== History ==
=== Just Four Men ===
In early 1963, after several name changes, Just Four Men settled in Manchester as they decided to become professional. At the time, the group was composed of Demetrius "Dee" Christopolus as lead vocalist and rhythm guitarist, lead guitarist Johnny Murphy, drummer Larry Arends, and bassist Pete Turner. The band became a popular attraction in Liverpool as they shifted through two lineup changes, Keith Shepherd replaced Pete Turner, then John Kelman replaced Johnny Murphy. They then toured with more prominent groups including The Rolling Stones, The Searchers and Del Shannon. Despite their initial success, the band was plagued by missed opportunities when they rejected "Trains and Boats and Planes", a later hit for The Dakotas and had lawsuit threats against them over their name that prevented Four Just Men from continuing their television commitments. The lawsuits originated from another band with the same name, so from that point on the Four Just Men became Just Four Men.

Still, the band signed a contract with EMI Records in 1964, and produced two singles, which were both recorded at Abbey Road Studios. Their debut single, "That's My Baby" was released on 27 November 1964, and the second one, "There's Not One Thing", was released on 5 February 1965. Both singles were positively received, but the release dates were in correlation with The Beatles' releases so sales were dwarfed in comparison. Just Four Men's recordings were centered around a heavy bass sound, an aspect they experimented upon when they became Wimple Winch. After being dropped from the label, the band continued to perform until early 1966, at which point they morphed into Wimple Winch.

=== Wimple Winch ===
The renamed band consisted of an altered lineup of Arends, Christopolus, John Kelman on lead guitar and newcomer Barrie Ashall on bass guitar. The name change was brought about as a result of the band's addition of heavier and more psychedelic components into their music. Auditions for the bass player were intensive, and were met with several failures, with Keith Shepherd staying on until Barrie Ashall managed to stand out among the other candidates. Within a few gigs after returning to performing, the band encountered their future manager, Mike Carr. Carr was opening a club in Stockport called "The Sinking Ship" and proposed that Wimple Winch become the house band. They accepted, under the conditions that they were guaranteed one performance per week, use of the property for rehearsals, and living quarters. The club, along with the band, established itself when Wimple Winch opened for The Jimi Hendrix Experience at the venue.

An associate of Fontana Records watched Wimple Winch perform and signed the group to record at Philips Studios in Stanhope Place in March 1966. Recording occurred over a few days as the band completed demos for their debut single. They chose "What's Been Done" as their first release. It received heavy local support and was listed as a "climber" by Radio London in April 1966, but still failed to chart. Before their next release, Kelman worked on side projects including on recordings with Wayne Fontana's backing group, The Opposition. For their second release, the band chose "Save My Soul", which incorporated a protopunk structure. The single was immensely popular locally upon its 17 June 1966 release but was unsuccessful nationally. "Save My Soul" has been recognized as one of the more innovative tracks of the Mersey beat scene and is also featured on the compilation album, Nuggets II: Original Artyfacts from the British Empire and Beyond, 1964–1969.

In between performing, Wimple Winch recorded in August and December 1966. Several tracks were finished, and the song, "Rumble on Mersey Square South", which was in the style of The Who, was released as the group's final single on 20 January 1967. Other demos from sessions remained unreleased, however they exhibited the band's continuing development in psychedelic rock, and incorporation of soul music. Back in Stockport, "The Sinking Ship" caught fire and destroyed the group's housing and equipment. As a result, Fontana Records decided to not resign Wimple Winch. The band continued to tour, and recorded more demos in a personal studio, but decided to disband in mid-1967. Kelman briefly reformed the Four Just Men in the early seventies with a new lineup, Mal Hoyland on bass guitar, Frank Garland, rhythm guitar and Arty Davies on drums but no additional recordings took place. also John and Barrie Ashall did a one off gig with Arty Davies on drums and called themselves Balderdash

== Discography ==
=== Singles ===
Just Four Men

- "That's My Baby" b/w "Things Will Never Be the Same", Parlophone UK R 5186, 27 November 1964
- "There's Not One Thing" b/w "Don't Come Any Closer", Parlophone UK R 5241, 5 February 1965

Wimple Winch

- "What's Been Done" b/w "I Really Love You", Fontana UK TF 686, April 1966
- "Save My Soul" b/w "Everybody's Worried 'Bout Tomorrow", Fontana UK TF 718, 17 June 1966
- "Rumble on Mersey Square South" b/w "Typical British Workmanship"/"Atmospheres", Fontana UK TF 781, 20 January 1967

=== Compilations ===
- The Wimple Winch Story Volume 2: 1966-1968 The Psychedelic Years, Bam-Caruso Records, 1991
- The Wimple Winch Story: 1963-1968, Bam-Caruso, 1992
- Tales From The Sinking Ship, Bam-Caruso, 2009
