= Please Stay (Burt Bacharach song) =

Single by The Drifters

from the album Save the Last Dance for Me
- B-side: "No Sweet Lovin'"
- Released: 1961
- Length: 2:14
- Label: Atlantic
- Songwriters: Burt Bacharach, Bob Hilliard

The Drifters singles chronology
"Some Kind of Wonderful" (1961)	"Please Stay" (1961)	"Sweets for My Sweet" (1961)

"Please Stay", also known as "(Don't Go) Please Stay", is one of songwriter Burt Bacharach's early pop hits. It is an early hit of The Drifters featuring the new lead singer Rudy Lewis, who replaced Ben E. King and features Dionne Warwick's sister Dee Dee Warwick and Doris Troy on background vocals. This song, along with "Some Kind of Wonderful" and "Sweets for My Sweet", were recorded in the same session.

== Backing musicians ==
- The musicians who backed the Drifters on this record include George Barnes and Allan Hanlon on guitar, Abie Baker on bass, Bobby Rosengarden and Ray Kessler on percussion and Ed Shaughnessy and Gary Chester on drums.

== Chart performance ==
In the US, "Please Stay" went to No. 13 on the R&B sides chart, and No. 14 on the Hot 100.

== Notable cover versions ==
The song has been covered extensively:

- Westlife covered the song as part of their lead single ‘Safe (Westlife song)’ as a B-side. Charted at number two in the UK and fourth in Ireland.
- The Cryin' Shames released a version in 1966 which reached number 26 in the UK, but was number 1 in Scotland.
- The Dave Clark Five reached number 75 in Canada in 1968 with their cover.
- The Love Affair released a version on their album The Everlasting Love Affair in 1968.
- Bay City Rollers released a version on their 1974 album Rollin’.
- Jonathan Butler's 1975 version reached number 2 in South Africa.
- Elvis Costello released a version on his 1995 covers album Kojak Variety.
- Marc Almond and Mekon also recorded a version in 2001.
- Duffy released a version on the Deluxe Edition of her debut album Rockferry.
- Ali Campbell released a version from his 2007 album, Running Free. The track name was changed to "Don't Go".

== Uses in media ==
The song has been used a number of times in TV and film:

- Daredevil: Born Again used the song in the 7th episode of season 1, "Art For Art's Sake"
- The Place Beyond the Pines uses the song in one of the earlier scenes of the film.
