= Everything's Alright (The Mojos song) =

Single by the Mojos
- A-side: "Everything's Al' Right"
- B-side: Give Your Lovin' To Me
- Released: 1964
- Genre: Merseybeat
- Length: 2:15
- Label: Decca Records
- Songwriter(s): Crouch, Konrad, Stavely, James, Karlson
- Producer(s): Belinda Recordings

The Mojos singles chronology
"Forever" (1963)	"Everything's Alright" (1964)	"Why Not Tonight?" (1964)

"Everything's Alright" is a song written and performed by the Mojos. It was released as a single in 1964, peaking at No. 9 in the UK Singles Chart.

Unusually for the time, both sides of the record were written by the band. "Everything's Alright" is credited to all five members of the band (Nicky Crouch, Bob Konrad, Stu James, Keith Karlson and "Simon Stavely", a pseudonym for keyboardist Terence O'Toole). Only Karlson, James and Stavely are listed as writers of the b-side, "Give Your Lovin' To Me".

An EP titled The Mojos, with "Everything's Alright" as the opening track, was released later in the year, backed with versions of American rhythm and blues tracks "I Got My Mojo Working" (a hit for Muddy Waters), "The One Who Really Loves You" (Mary Wells) and "Nobody But Me" (the Isley Brothers).

The band performed the song in the 1965 film Every Day's a Holiday.

David Bowie recorded a version of "Everything's Alright" for his Pin Ups album in 1973, which featured Aynsley Dunbar on drums, who was a member of the Mojos, but only after the "Everything's Alright" single.

The song is recorded in French by Eddy Mitchell on his 1964 album Toute la ville en parle… Eddy est formidable.
