= No Easy Way Out =

No Easy Way Out may refer to:

- "No Easy Way Out" (Robert Tepper song), from the 1985 motion picture soundtrack album Rocky IV
- "No Easy Way Out", a song by Ozzy Osbourne from Down to Earth
- Lucian Bute vs. Carl Froch, a championship boxing fight
- No Easy Way Out (album)

== See also ==
- Easy Way Out (disambiguation)
