= Rubble series =

Collection of compilation albums

Rubble is a 20-volume collection of compilation albums featuring mostly late-1960s British psychedelic rock compiled by Bam-Caruso Records, St Albans, Hertfordshire, England, by Phil Lloyd-Smee.

The first volume was created in 1984, and the series was completed in 2002 (and later, the New Rubble series has begun). Rubble is one of the first series of compilation albums of psychedelic rock, freakbeat, rhythm and blues, garage rock and beat music of the mid to late 1960s in the United Kingdom. It predated similar compilation series, such as the English Freakbeat series, which AIP Records started in 1988.

The name "Rubble" is influenced by the title of the seminal Nuggets double LP, and resembles the titles of several similar compilation series, such as the Pebbles series, Boulders series and Rough Diamonds series. Most of the bands on these albums were not commercially successful, such as the Glass Menagerie, The Onyx, Wonderland and Wild Silk. However, the albums also include a few better-known bands, such as Tomorrow, The Poets, The Pretty Things, The Spencer Davis Group and The Crazy World of Arthur Brown.

== Discography ==
There are 20 volumes in the Rubble series:

1. The Psychedelic Snarl
2. Pop-Sike Pipe-Dreams
3. Nightmares in Wonderland
4. The 49-Minute Technicolour Dream
5. The Electric Crayon Set
6. The Clouds Have Groovy Faces
7. Pictures In the Sky (Rubble)
8. All the Colors of Darkness
9. Plastic Wilderness
10. Professor Jordan's Magic Sound Show
11. Adventures In the Mist
12. Staircase to Nowhere
13. Freak Beat Fantoms
14. The Magic Rocking Horse
15. 5000 Seconds Over Toyland
16. Glass Orchid Aftermath
17. A Trip In a Painted World
18. Rainbow Thyme Wynders
19. Eiderdown Mindfog
20. Thrice Upon a Time (Nothing Is Real)
