= Pebbles, Volume 6 (1979 album) =

Compilation album
- Released: 1980
- Recorded: Mid-1960s
- Genres: Garage rock, freakbeat
- Length: 43:55
- Labels: BFD; AIP

chronology
Pebbles, Volume 5	Pebbles, Volume 6	Pebbles, Volume 7 (LP)

Pebbles, Volume 6 is a compilation album among the LPs in the Pebbles series. Subtitled The Roots of Mod, Volume 6 is the only album in the Pebbles series that features primarily British music. The Pebbles, Volume 6 CD is not at all related to this LP; instead, the CD featuring the songs on this LP was released as English Freakbeat, Volume 6.

== Release data ==
The album was released in 1980 by BFD Records (as #BFD-5023) and was kept in print for many years by AIP Records.

Although the Pebbles, Volume 6 1994 CD has completely different music, most of the tracks on this album were reissued in 1996 on CD by AIP Records as English Freakbeat, Volume 6. For convenience, information on this CD is also included so that a comparison can be easily made between the tracks on these two highly similar albums.

== Omitted tracks on the English Freakbeat CD ==
CD cover.

As with the first five volumes of the Pebbles series, AIP Records omitted some tracks on the LP in the reissue of the album as English Freakbeat, Volume 6. In this case, two excellent covers on the LP are not included on the CD: "Leave My Kitten Alone" by the First Gear and the Bo Diddley classic, "Here 'Tis" by the Betterdays. Additionally, "Singing the Blues" by the Rats is omitted, though the Jason Eddie & the Centremen performance of this song is included on the CD in place of their song on the LP.

== Notes on the tracks ==
The following information was taken primarily from the liner notes on English Freakbeat, Volume 6. Twink was one of the members of the Fairies, a British rhythm & blues band; Twink would later be one of the founding members of a very different band, the Pink Fairies.

"Leave My Kitten Alone" is a celebrated Beatles rarity, written by Little Willie John, that is one of the standout tracks on the first Beatles Anthology collection. This version of the song was released in 1964 and features a young Jimmy Page.

Members of the Cheynes include Mick Fleetwood, co-founder of Fleetwood Mac, as well as Peter Bardens and Phil Sawyer. They released several singles between 1963 and 1965.

The real name of the front man for Jason Eddie and the Centremen is Al Wycherley, the brother of Billy Fury, a pop star in the late 1950s. Their experimental treatment of "Singing the Blues" was released in the U.S. by Capitol Records in June 1966.

The music by Bo and Peep was recorded in 1964, and the band is mainly The Rolling Stones plus others that might have included Gene Pitney and Phil Spector

== Track listing ==
=== LP: Pebbles, Volume 6 ===
Side 1:

1. The Fairies: "Get Yourself Home", 2:17 – rel. 1964
2. Junco Partners: "Take This Hammer", 2:05
3. The Fairies: "I'll Dance", 2:01 – rel. 1964
4. The Cheynes: "Respectable" (The Isley Brothers), 1:50
5. The First Gear: "Leave My Kitten Alone", 2:12, vinyl-only track
6. The Betterdays: "Here 'Tis" (Elias B. McDaniel), 2:07, vinyl-only track
7. The Wild Ones: "Bowie Man", 2:20 – rel. 1964
8. David John and the Mood: "Bring it to Jerome" (Elias B. McDaniel), 2:07 – rel. 1965
9. The Wheels: "Road Block", 3:14, vinyl-only track

Side 2:

1. The Fairies: "Anytime at All", 2:09 – rel. 1964
2. Rhythm & Blues, Inc.: "Honey Don't", 2:15 – rel. 1965
3. Erkey Grant & the Eerwigs: "I'm a Hog for You", 1:58
4. David John and the Mood: "I Love to See You Strut", 2:02 – rel. 1965
5. Bill & Will: "Goin' to the River", 2:20
6. Blues by Five: "Boom Boom" (John Lee Hooker), 2:10
7. Steve Aldo: "Baby What You Want Me to Do" (Jimmy Reed), 3:28 – rel. 1964
8. The Rats: "Spoonful", 2:17, vinyl-only track
9. Jason Eddie & the Centremen: "Singing the Blues", 2:28
10. Bo and Peep: "Young Love", 2:35

=== CD: English Freakbeat, Volume 6 ===
1. The Fairies: "Get Yourself Home" – rel. 1964
2. The Fairies: "I'll Dance" – rel. 1964
3. The Fairies: "Anytime at All" – rel. 1964
4. Junco Partners: "Take This Hammer" — rel. 1965
5. The Cheynes: "Respectable" (The Isley Brothers)
6. The Wild Ones: "Bowie Man" — rel. 1964
7. Rhythm & Blues, Inc.: "Honey Don't" — rel. 1965
8. Erkey Grant & the Eerwigs: "I'm a Hog for You" — rel. 1963
9. David John & the Mood: "Bring it to Jerome" — rel. 1965
10. David John & the Mood: "I Love to See You Strut" — rel. 1965
11. Bill & Will: "Goin' to the River"
12. Blues by Five: "Boom Boom" (John Lee Hooker) — rel. 1964
13. Steve Aldo: "Baby What You Want Me to Do" (Jimmy Reed)
14. Jason Eddie & the Centremen: "Singing the Blues"
15. Bo & Peep: "Young Love" — rel. 1964
16. Chicago Line: "Shimmy Shimmy Ko Ko Bop" — rel. 1966, CD bonus track
17. Chicago Line: "Jump Back" — rel. 1966, CD bonus track
18. The Wranglers: "Li'l Liza Jane" — rel. 1964, CD bonus track
19. David John & the Mood: "To Catch that Man" — rel. 1964, CD bonus track
20. David John & the Mood: "Diggin' for Gold" — rel. 1965, CD bonus track
21. Nix-Nomads: "She'll Be Sweeter than You" — rel. 1964, CD bonus track
22. Bo & Peep: "Rise of the Brighton Surf" — rel. 1964, CD bonus track

== Release history ==
=== LP: Pebbles, Volume 6 ===
BFD Records (#BFD-5023) — 1979

AIP Records – several reissues

=== CD: English Freakbeat, Volume 6 ===
AIP Records – (#AIP-CD-1055) — 1996

== See also ==
English Freakbeat series
