= Looking Back (The Cherry Slush album) =

Compilation album by The Cherry Slush
- Released: 2001
- Recorded: 1966–1969
- Genre: Garage rock; psychedelic rock
- Length: 20:17
- Label: WMG
- Producer: Dick Wagner

Looking Back is a compilation album by the American garage rock band, the Cherry Slush, and released on WMG Records, in 2001 (see 2001 in music). It was a response to a growing reinterest in the band's music, and extensive bootlegging of their material since their disbandment. The album also saw the former band members cooperating with record producer Dick Wagner, who was a prime factor in the Cherry Slush's regional and brief national success.

Looking Back compiles all of the group's released material generated from their four singles. During their recording career, the band worked under the monikers, the Bells of Rhymny, the Cherry Slush, and the Slush, before disbanding in 1969. The album highlights their regional hit, "She'll Be Back", and the Cherry Slush's biggest hit, the Wagner-penned "I Cannot Stop You", which possesses the unique characteristic of entering all three major chart listings. In accordance to the album's release the band reconvened for a reunion concert in Freeland, Michigan, in 2002.

== Track listing ==
1. "She'll Be Back" (Mark Burdick, Dan Parsons, Dick Wagner) - 2:33
2. "The Wicked Old Witch" (Wagner) - 2:32
3. "I Cannot Stop You" (Wagner) - 2:34
4. "Don't Walk Away" (Parsons, Coughlin, Gene Bruce) - 2:41
5. "Day Don't Come" (Mark Barkan, Ritchie Adams) - 2:53
6. "Gotta Take It Easy" (Bob Stanley) - 2:06
7. "Birthday" John Lennon, Paul McCartney) - 2:31
8. "I'll Feel a Whole Lot Better" (Gene Clark) - 2:27
