= Rosalyn (song) =

Single by Pretty Things

from the album The Pretty Things
- B-side: "Big Boss Man"
- Released: 8 May 1964
- Genre: Garage rock; rhythm and blues
- Label: Fontana
- Songwriters: Jimmy Duncan, Bill Farley

Pretty Things singles chronology
"Rosalyn" (1964)	"Don't Bring Me Down" (1964)

"Rosalyn" is the debut single by British rock band Pretty Things, released in 1964. It charted at number 41 in the United Kingdom.

== History ==
"Rosalyn" was written by songwriter Jimmy Duncan, who was also co-manager of the Pretty Things with Bryan Morrison at the time, along with Bill Farley, studio owner where the band was recording. The song was recorded as their debut single on Fontana Records, and became the Pretties' first hit, reaching No. 41 on the UK singles chart in July 1964. It features Bo Diddley style lead guitar as well as prominent slide guitar.

== Personnel ==
- Phil May - lead vocals
- Dick Taylor - rhythm guitar
- Brian Pendleton - slide/lead guitar, backing vocals
- John Stax - bass guitar, backing vocals
- Viv Prince - drums

== Covers ==
David Bowie recorded a cover version of "Rosalyn" and released it on his album Pin Ups. It was released as a free sampler single to Record Club members by RCA in New Zealand in November 1973. "Sorrow", was released, as in the rest of the world, as the commercial single from the album.

In 1972, British rock group Stack Waddy covered the song on their album Bugger Off!.

== Charts ==
Chart (1964)	Peak position
UK Singles (OCC)	41
