= We All Together =

Peruvian rock band

- Origin: Lima, Peru
- Genres: Rock and roll; psychedelic rock
- Years active: 1971–1974; 1989–2011
- Past members: Eduardo Samamé; Iván Cárdenas; Carlos Guerrero; Carlos Pacheco; Ernesto Samamé (†); Manuel Cornejo; Saúl Cornejo (†); Carlos Kakutani; Armando Pattroni; Augusto Castro; Iván Carreño; Ricardo Ormeño; Carlos Paredes; Eduardo Saldarriaga; Félix Varvarande; Jose Wherrems; Armando Barrios; Henry Ueunten
- Website: Grupo We All Together

We All Together was a Peruvian rock and roll band formed in 1971. They composed songs in English and Spanish. Their best known songs are the cover "Carry On Till Tomorrow" (originally by Badfinger), "Hey Revolution" and "It's A Sin To Go Away", which appeared on Nuggets II.

The first line-up was formed by Saul Cornejo, his brother Manuel Cornejo, and Carlos Guerrero, who were the founding members, as well as Carlos Salom and Ernesto Samamé. They broke up in 1974 and regrouped in 1989 and later consisted of Carlos Guerrero, Carlos Pacheco, and Iván Cárdenas. The group once again disbanded after a farewell concert on November 5, 2011, celebrating their 40 years of music.

Saúl Cornejo died on February 12, 2026, at the age of 79.

== Discography ==
- We All Together (1972)
- We All Together 2 (1974)
- 1990, La Década (1990)
- Cincuenta/Cincuenta (1991)
- Quédate (1993)
- Aliteraciones (1998)
- We All Together (Back Together) (2008)
- Surprise (2009)
