= Don't Bring Me Down (Pretty Things song) =

Single by The Pretty Things
- B-side: "We'll Be Together"
- Released: 16 October 1964
- Genre: Rhythm and blues; beat
- Length: 2:12
- Label: Fontana
- Songwriter: Johnnie Dee

The Pretty Things singles chronology
"Rosalyn" (1964)	"Don't Bring Me Down" (1964)	"Honey I Need" (1965)

"Don't Bring Me Down" is a song written by Johnny Dee (road manager for British band the Fairies) and first performed by the rock band the Pretty Things in 1964. It was a number 10 hit on the UK Singles Chart, and reached number 34 in Canada. The song was featured on the North American version of their debut album, The Pretty Things. David Bowie covered the song on his 1973 album Pin Ups.

== Personnel ==
- Phil May – lead vocals, harmonica, tambourine
- Dick Taylor – lead guitar
- Brian Pendleton – rhythm guitar
- John Stax – bass guitar
- Viv Prince – drums
