= Rainin' in My Heart (EP) =

EP by Pretty Things
- Released: August 1965
- Length: 12:01
- Label: Fontana

Pretty Things chronology
The Pretty Things (1965)	Rainin' in My Heart (1965)	Get the Picture? (1965)

Rainin' in My Heart is an extended play 45 rpm record released by the English rock band Pretty Things in 1965. The record reached # 12 in the British EP charts in October of that same year.

== Track listing ==
Side one

1. "Rainin' in My Heart" – (Jerry West, James Moore) – 2:31
2. "London Town" (Dick Taylor) – 2:27

Side two

1. "Sittin' All Alone" – (Dick Taylor, Ian Sterling, Phil May) – 3:01
2. "Get a Buzz" – (Pretty Things) – 4:02

== Personnel ==
Pretty Things

- Dick Taylor – lead guitar
- Phil May – lead vocals, harmonica
- Brian Pendleton – rhythm guitar, backing vocals on "Sittin' All Alone"
- John Stax – bass guitar, harmonica on "Rainin' in My Heart", backing vocals on "Sittin' All Alone"
- Skip Alan, Bobby Graham – drums
