= English Freakbeat series =

Group of compilation albums

Logomark from the second volume

The English Freakbeat series is a group of five compilation albums, released in the late 1980s, that were issued by AIP Records. The LPs featured recordings that were released in the mid-1960s by English rock bands in the freakbeat, early punk, proto-punk, R&B, mod, and beat genres. The series served as a follow-up to the Pebbles, Volume 6 LP, itself subtitled The Roots of Mod, which was the only album in the Pebbles series that was devoted to English music. When the English Freakbeat series was reissued as CDs in the 1990s, the Pebbles, Volume 6 LP was adapted into the English Freakbeat, Volume 6 CD.

== Nature of the music ==
The AIP Records website describes the albums in the English Freakbeat series as being "[d]evoted to some of the more raw & rockin' UK nuggets that have been overlooked by England's more pop-obsessed compilers, [having an] emphasis on punk and R&B but with some volumes leaning toward mod-beat and art pop." Though disparaged as "failed mod singles" by some on-line reviewers, these recordings are important in many respects, not least because many of the musicians enjoyed considerably more success and prominence in later years.

This music was created and released somewhat earlier than the time period of the garage rock era in the U.S. and elsewhere – 1961-1965 generally (although some of the music was released as late as 1967) – but there are many similarities between these musical styles. Additionally, psychedelic rock music was prevalent on both sides of the Atlantic. However, English recording artists continued to be influenced by the American blues and R&B musicians that helped give rise to the British Invasion in the first place; whereas, in the U.S., the music was in more of a rock direction. As an example, the English Freakbeat albums include several covers of songs by American blues legends like Muddy Waters, Howlin' Wolf, Bo Diddley and John Lee Hooker; such covers are virtually unknown among American garage rock bands.

Some of the bands featured on these albums may not be British, and at least one (the Tennessee band Bill & Will, on English Freakbeat, Volume 6) definitely is not. Additionally, several of the recordings that were made by English artists were apparently never released there; many were released only in the U.S., while others are taken from singles or albums that were issued in Italy, France, Sweden, Hungary, etc.

One early review of the first volume in this series raved about "gems from groups like the Sheffields, the Loot, the Chasers, the Primitives and the Beat Merchants – basically, the kind of sounds that are liable to make me lose my marbles at any given moment! . . . This is one of the best compilations I've heard in ages, and given the choice between this and a yard high stack of U.S. `60s punk comps, I'd take English Freakbeat every time."

== Discography ==
=== LPs ===
- English Freakbeat, Volume 1; #AIP-10039
- English Freakbeat, Volume 2; #AIP-10047
- English Freakbeat, Volume 3; #AIP-10048
- English Freakbeat, Volume 4; #AIP-10051
- English Freakbeat, Volume 5; #AIP-10049

=== CDs ===
- English Freakbeat, Volume 1; #AIP-CD-1039
- English Freakbeat, Volume 2; #AIP-CD-1047
- English Freakbeat, Volume 3; #AIP-CD-1048
- English Freakbeat, Volume 4; #AIP-CD-1051
- English Freakbeat, Volume 5; #AIP-CD-1049
- English Freakbeat, Volume 6; #AIP-CD-1055 (based on LP Pebbles, Volume 6; #BFD-5023)
