= The Mojos =

English beat music group (1963–1968)

- Also known as: Stu James and the Mojos
- Origin: Liverpool, England
- Genres: Merseybeat, pop, rock
- Years active: 1963–1968
- Label: Decca Records
- Members: Nicky Crouch; Terry O'Toole; Keith Karlson; John "Bob" Conrad
- Past members: Aynsley Dunbar; Lewis Collins; Adrian Wilkinson; Tony Cowell; Jon Werrell; Dave Cowell; Stu James

The Mojos were an English beat group formed in Liverpool in 1963, best known for their hit UK single, "Everything's Alright", with two other singles charting low in the UK Singles Chart in 1964.

== Biography ==
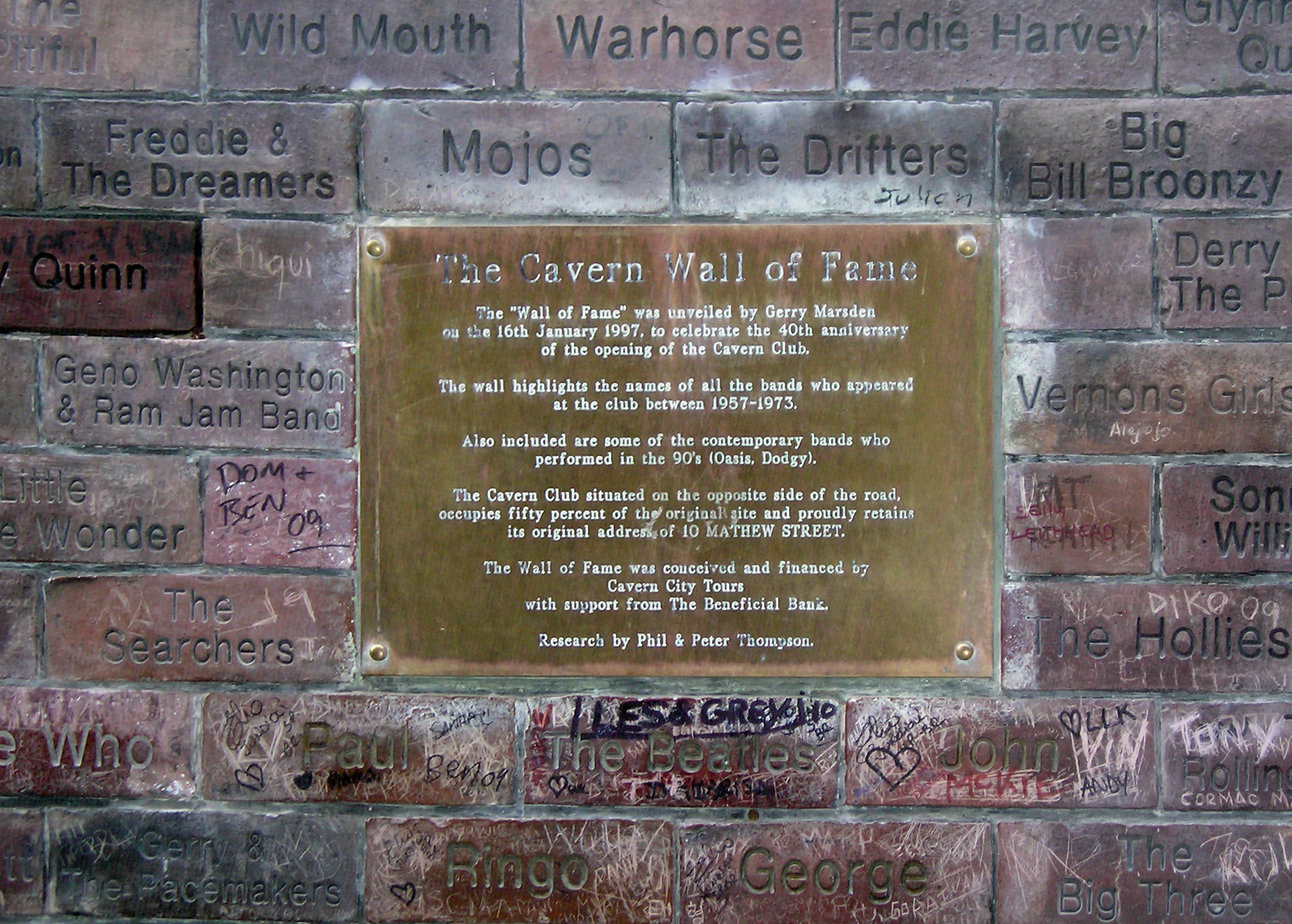
The Mojo's are included in The Cavern Club Wall of Fame (top left of plaque)

The band formed under the name the Nomads as a duo in 1962 and originally consisted of bassist Keith Karlson (born Keith Alcock) and Jon "Bob" Conrad. After that the band was joined in September 1962 by lead singer, pianist Stu James (born Stuart Slater), rhythm guitarist, vocalist Adrian Lord (born Adrian Wilkinson). The band continued without a lead guitarist when Wood left. At the suggestion of Beatle George Harrison, pianist Terry O'Toole was added to the lineup in August 1963; Harrison having heard him play at the Blue Angel jazz club. The band also changed their name in August 1963 to the Mojos and Lord changed from rhythm guitarist to lead guitarist. This lineup recorded "My Whole Life Through", which was featured on the Oriole Records This is Merseybeat compilation album, and the debut single "They Say".

"They Say" achieved some popularity; amongst other things, it was used for the party scene in the 1964 film The Comedy Man.

Despite having written the single's b-side, Lord (Wilkinson) left the group soon after its release in October 1963 and was replaced by Nicky Crouch (formerly of Faron's Flamingos) (born Nicholas Crouch, Aintree). This was the line-up that was to continue until October 1964, recording the group's three charting singles - "Everything's Alright" (no. 9), "Why Not Tonight" (no. 25) and "Seven Daffodils" (no. 30) - as well as an EP. They appeared in the movie Every Day's a Holiday and like many of their contemporaries the group played at the Star-Club in Hamburg, Germany.

In October 1964, Karlson, Conrad and O'Toole left the group and James and Crouch were joined by drummer Aynsley Dunbar and bassist Lewis Collins (26 May 1946 – 27 November 2013). This line-up recorded the singles "Comin' On to Cry" and "Wait A Minute" (the latter released as by "Stu James and the Mojos"), for Decca - before disbanding in September 1966.

James and Crouch formed a new version with Birmingham bass player Deke Vernon and Southampton drummer Martin Smith and released a further single "Good-Bye, Dolly Gray" in February 1967 which also failed to chart. They then spent several months playing at a luxury hotel in the Ivory Coast later that year.

James moved back to Southampton and reformed the Mojos in late 1967 with local musicians Eddie Harnett on lead guitar, Duncan Campbell on bass and Tony House on drums, and recorded "Until My Baby Comes Home", for Liberty.

Collins became an actor, starring in The Professionals, and Dunbar became a noted session musician, playing with Frank Zappa, David Bowie and John Mayall, among others. Stu James stayed in the music business taking management roles at Bradley's Records and later Chrysalis Records. Crouch currently plays in a group called Nicky Crouch's Mojos, which features members of other 1960s Merseybeat acts, including the Swinging Blue Jeans, Rory Storm and the Hurricanes and Faron's Flamingos.

The Mojos were reformed as a touring band in the 1970s by the Hal Carter Organisation with various professional musicians including lead guitarist Antz Cowell (the Tornados, Billy Fury, Marty Wilde), bass guitarist Dave Cowell (Fusion Orchestra) and drummer Jon Werrell (the Tornados, Heinz, Dustin Gee, Carl Simmons). They supported Mud and Showaddywaddy on some UK tour dates. Whilst in Jersey during a break in touring, Jon Werrell loaned his silver Premier drumkit to John Bonham for Led Zeppelin's impromptu club gigs in St.Helier.

Lead singer Stu James died on 10 May 2023, at the age of 77.

== Discography ==
Year	Single	UK Singles Chart
1963	A. "They Say" (Byers); B. "Forever" (Wilkinson)	-
1964	A. "Everything's Al'right" (Crouch/Konrad/Staveley/James/Karlson); B. "Give Your Lovin' To Me" (Staveley/James/Karlson)	No. 9
1964	A. "Why Not Tonight" (James/O'Toole); B. "Don't Do It Any More" (James)	No. 25
1964	A. "Seven Daffodils" (Hayes/Moseley); B. "Nothin' At All" (James/Crouch)	No. 30
1964	"The Mojos" EP; 1. "Everything's Alright" (Crouch/Konrad/Staveley/James/Karlson); 2. "I Got My Mojo Working" (Foster); 3. "The One Who Really Loves You" (Robinson); 4. "Nobody But Me" (Isley/Isley/Isley)	-
1965	A. "Comin' On to Cry" (James/Crouch); B. "That's The Way It Goes" (James/Crouch)	-
1965	A. "Wait a Minute" (Lynch/Shuman); B. "Wonder If She Knows" (James/Crouch) (as Stu James and the Mojos)	-
1967	A. "Goodbye, Dolly Gray" (Cobb/Barnes); B. "I Just Can't Let Her Go" (Ross)	-
1968	A. "Until My Baby Comes Home" (Slater); B. "Seven Park Avenue" (Slater)	-

A compilation entitled Everything's Alright: The Complete Recordings was released in 2009 by RPM Records. As its name suggests, it features all of the above (plus the 'This is Merseybeat' compilation album track "My Whole Life Through"), in chronological order by release date.
