= Freakbeat =

Genre of rock music in the 1960s

- Other names: Freak beat; Freak-beat
- Stylistic origins: British R&B; beat; garage rock; surf rock
- Cultural origins: Mid-1960s, United Kingdom
- Derivative forms: Psychedelic rock; progressive rock; experimental rock; punk rock; power pop

Other topics
- Music of the United Kingdom (1960s); British rock; Nederbeat; Nederpop; Freak scene; Proto-punk

Freakbeat is a subgenre of rock music originating from "Swinging London" in the mid-to-late 1960s, its name referring to hard-edged mod music characterised by a raw, intense, energetic and experimental sound bridging the rhythm and blues and beat music of the British Invasion with early psychedelia. The retrospective term was coined by English music journalist Phil Smee in 1984.

Freakbeat has stylistic origins in surf rock and functioned as the British response to garage rock. The music had links to the early UK underground and the peacock revolution, attracting audiences of mods, beatniks and early hippies. Freakbeat represents a point of contact between the music of the 1960s counterculture and that of the later punk movement in the 1970s, and has been described by Record Collector magazine as "more punk than punk itself". Many popular musicians have played in groups that later were described as freakbeat.

== Characteristics ==
=== Origin ===
In 1984, English music journalist Phil Smee coined the retrospective term "freakbeat" when compiling reissues of obscure mid-1960s records for the Rubble series. These records featured music that existed in a gap between beat music and psychedelic rock roughly from 1964 to 1967. Smee described the "freak" part of freakbeat to mean "touched by the hand of mayhem". According to Record Collector magazine, artists worked "beyond the formula required for commercial success — to produce exciting, and often outrageous, music". Richard Norris described the genre as "weird mod records" and "basically mod gone a bit wrong".

Freakbeat music is part of what was referred to contemporaneously in the 1960s as underground or countercultural music. In a 1970 article (titled "Brown Shoes Don't Make It", after the 1966 Frank Zappa song), published in the underground magazine Oz, music journalist Charles Shaar Murray wrote:

"It was, at least for me and most of the people I know, the music that first aroused interest in things Underground, and the music is still the most mature and developed manifestation of the culture of the Underground."

In the prologue to White Bicycles: Making Music in the 1960s, producer Joe Boyd claimed that the sixties "peaked" during a set by Tomorrow, a group later described as freakbeat, at the UFO Club in London. The club also hosted other groups associated with the style, including the Move and the Smoke. Vertigo magazine refers to the title track of Peter Whitehead's 1966–1967 counterculture documentary Tonite Let's All Make Love in London, the 1966 Pink Floyd composition "Interstellar Overdrive", as freakbeat. That film's soundtrack also features the Small Faces, who have similarly been identified with the style.

=== Musical style ===
Freakbeat has a greater intensity, rawness and energy than British beat, using distortion and psychedelic studio techniques within concise pop structures, without the jams and formal experimentation of psychedelic rock. While using instrumentation similar to garage rock, such as the Hammond B3 organ, freakbeat artists performed in a manner that was unconventional for R&B, with heavy use of guitar feedback, tremolo, and cello bows or plectrums scraped upon guitar strings. The style also emphasises heavy bass, loud and frantic drumming, rapid drum fills, and a strong, danceable groove influenced by British R&B.

Production also differentiates freakbeat from beat music. The style has origins in surf rock and often features heavy use of distortion, compression, analogue clipping, phasing, flanging, echo and reverb, as well as automatic double tracking on guitars and vocals. Producer Joe Meek has been associated with freakbeat, having worked with bands such as the Riot Squad, the Syndicats and the Cryin' Shames. Other notable producers include Shel Talmy, who collaborated with the Who and the Kinks and is known for producing the Creation, and Mark Wirtz, who worked with Tomorrow.

Groups that have been referred to as freakbeat include the Action, the Attack, the Birds, the Creation, Wimple Winch, the Smoke, the Eyes, the Fleur de Lys, the Small Faces, the Sorrows, and the In Crowd. Songs by popular acts have also occasionally been considered freakbeat, such as the Yardbirds' "Happenings Ten Years Time Ago", the Beatles' "Taxman", the Who's "The Ox", and the early renditions of Pink Floyd's "Interstellar Overdrive" shown in films by Peter Whitehead.

== Legacy ==
=== Influence ===
Music journalist Toby Manning has referred to freakbeat as the "birth of British psychedelia" and by extension genres such as progressive rock. There is a debate in musicology about whether British psychedelia presented a sanitised version of freakbeat as the phenomenon of Swinging London became increasingly commercial. The Coventry Telegraph described freakbeat music as "too far ahead of its time". The style has drawn links between the music of the 1960s counterculture and that of the 1970s punk movement, and has been described by Record Collector magazine as "more punk than punk itself".

Groups such as the Who and the Pretty Things which have at times been classed as freakbeat would later pioneer the rock opera.

Musicians such as Ronnie Wood, Steve Howe, Jeff Beck, Jimmy Page, John Helliwell, Ritchie Blackmore, Judy Dyble, Robert Fripp, Michael Giles, Ian McDonald, Geoff Richardson, Peter Frampton, Chris Squire, Clive Bunker, Jeff Lynne, Roy Wood, Bev Bevan, Ginger Baker, Keith Emerson, Mitch Mitchell, David Bowie, Marc Bolan, and Van Morrison have all played in groups that have been referred to as freakbeat.

The 1980s mod revival was more influenced by what came to be understood as freakbeat than by conventional mod. There are a number of contemporary freakbeat revivalist groups in the 2020s such as the Embrooks, Galileo 7, the Crystal Teardrop, the Baron Four, and the Jack Cades.

=== Compilations ===
As a consequence of being a retroactively labelled style, freakbeat is most prominently featured on retrospective compilation albums such as Phil Smee's Rubble series. In 1998, Smee worked with Deram Records to release The Freakbeat Scene.

In the late 1980s AIP Records released English Freakbeat, a group of five compilation albums. The series served as a follow-up to Pebbles, Volume 6: The Roots of Mod, which was the only album devoted to English music in the Pebbles series.

Much of the music on Rhino Records's 2001 compilation Nuggets II: Original Artyfacts from the British Empire and Beyond, 1964–1969 can be classified as freakbeat.

Since 2004, the New Untouchables organisation has released eleven freakbeat compilations under the name Le Beat Bespoké, most recently in 2026. The organisation has also hosted mod events and festivals featuring freakbeat revivalist bands and vinyl dance nights.

In 2018, Acid Jazz Records released the compilation A Kaleidoscope Of Sounds: Psychedelic And Freakbeat Masterpieces.

== See also ==
- Swinging Sixties
- UK Underground
- Mod (subculture)
- List of Freakbeat groups
- Los Angeles freak scene
- Freak-out (slang)
- English Freakbeat series
