= I Cannot Stop You =

- 1968 German picture sleeve

Single by The Cherry Slush
- B-side: "Don't Walk Away"
- Released: January 1968
- Recorded: 1967 Audio Recorders Studio, Cleveland, Ohio
- Genre: Garage rock
- Length: 2:40
- Label: USA
- Songwriter(s): Dick Wagner
- Producer(s): Dick Wagner

The Cherry Slush singles chronology
"She'll Be Back" (1967)	"I Cannot Stop You" (1968)	"Day Don't Come" (1968)

"I Cannot Stop You" is the second single by the American garage rock band, The Cherry Slush, written by Dick Wagner, and released in January 1968 initially on Coconut Groove Records. The song is arguably the group's most known recording, distinguished by the composition's use of the Hammond B3 organ and a horn instrumental played by the session musician, Don Sheets. Recording began at Audio Recorders Studio, in Cleveland, when the band was still working as the Bells of Rhymny. For the track, Gene Bruce swapped lead guitar with the keyboard player Mark Burdick.

The B-side, "Don't Walk Away", the earliest composition by The Cherry Slush, was previously recorded at Schiell Studios, and reworked at the same location, but with Wagner producing. The bass guitarist Art Hauffe recalled, "Wagner suggested that 'Don’t Walk Away' needed a bridge, so Parsons and Burdick went outside and came back with something that sounded like Roy Orbison." After altering the lyrical content, the song was completed relatively quickly, in about one hour.

"I Cannot Stop You" was originally released on the Flint-based recording label, Coconut Groove, under the band's new name, The Cherry Slush. Coconut Groove sold the group's recording contract to the national distributor, USA Records. The single has the rare quality of being one of the few garage rock tracks to chart on all three major charts; it bubbled under the Billboard charts at number 119, peaked at number 35 on Cashbox, and reached number 93 on Record World. In total, the single sold approximately 75,000 copies; however, USA Records went bankrupt, consequently preventing the release from obtaining any more success. "I Cannot Stop You" was later released on the 2001 compilation album, Looking Back, which comprised all of the group's released recordings, and it has appeared on other garage rock albums as well.
