= The Eyes (band) =

British psychedelic rock band

- The Eyes in 1966.

Background information
- Origin: London, United Kingdom
- Genres: Freakbeat; psychedelic rock
- Years active: 1964–1967
- Past members: Barry Allchin (bass); Brian Corcoran (drums); Phil Heatley (guitar); Chris Lovegrove (lead guitar); Terry Nolder (vocals)

The Eyes were a British freakbeat and psychedelic rock band, formed in 1964 and disbanded in 1967. During 1965 and 1966, they released a number of singles such as "When the Night Falls", "The Immediate Pleasure", "You're Too Much" and "I'm Rowed Out".

The band evolved out of an outfit called The Renegades, an instrumental combo, who, when they added a vocalist, became known as Gerry Hart and The Hartbeats. The name changed to The Eyes in 1964. The Arrival of the Eyes was released in 1966, and contained both sides of their first two singles, "When The Night Falls" / "I'm Rowed Out" and "The Immediate Pleasure" / "My Degeneration".

Rare Record Price Guide links the album A Tribute to the Rolling Stones, by The Pupils, with The Eyes; "The Pupils" being a likely pseudonym for the band.
