= The Cherry Slush =

American garage rock band

- Also known as: The Bells of Rhymny; The Slush
- Origin: Saginaw, Michigan, United States
- Genres: Garage rock; psychedelic rock
- Years active: 1965–1969
- Labels: Dicto; USA; Chivalry
- Past members: Dan Parsons; Mark Burdick; Art Hauffe; Dick Coughlin; Tom Armbruster; Gene Bruce; Charlie Woodward; Brian Bennett

The Cherry Slush was an American garage rock band formed in Saginaw, Michigan, in 1965, when the group was known as the Wayfarers and later cut records first as The Bells of Rhymny. They were composed of junior high school students in their 1964–1965 school year, and became a regional success in the Detroit, Michigan music scene. Musically, the band was inspired by The Byrds, who were achieving national success during the period. The group released four singles during their existence, most notably the two regional hits, "She'll Be Back" and "I Cannot Stop You". They were one of the few garage rock bands of the era to have a single chart on the three major listings, Billboard, Cashbox, and Record World.

== History ==
=== Beginnings ===
The band formed as the Wayfarers when the members were all enrolled in the eighth grade at Arthur Hill High School. They formed as a hobby for the teenagers as they played in jam sessions and school assemblies. Early on, the band's personnel went through several line-up changes, but solidified as Dan Parsons on lead vocals, Mark Burdick on lead guitar, Art Hauffe on bass guitar, Dick Coughlin on drums and Tom Armbruster on rhythm guitar. With the complete alignment, the group changed its name to the Captives, as suggested by Coughlin, before their first paid gig in 1965. For three weeks the band prepared for the concert, which was in their school's basement, and it awarded them a $5 payment. By the fall of 1965, Armbruster was forced to withdraw from the band when his family moved to Ohio. The remaining members proceeded as a quartet, covering songs from bands of the British Invasion in their live performances. No known recordings were conducted in this period, but under the next name change they began garnering enough interest for a recording contract.

=== The Bells of Rhymny ===
In mid-1966, the band agreed to another moniker change. That year, the group had been inspired by The Byrds, whose cover versions of "Mr. Tambourine Man", and later "Turn! Turn! Turn!" were reaching the top of the national charts. The new name, The Bells of Rhymny, derived from the Pete Seeger composition of the same name. With the new identity, the band added another guitarist, Gene Bruce, who impressed the band in his audition, and enabled the band to closely replicate the sound of The Byrds. His first appearance for the band was at a school dance in Zilwaukee, Michigan. The band was able to travel to other gigs thanks to Bruce's mother Vivian Bruce, who would act as the band's manager. In March 1966, the band earned a big break when Frank Patrick, owner of the regionally popular Daniel's Den, called Vivian Bruce to set up a concert at the venue. For their first performance at the Den, they opened for fellow Michigan band, Terry Knight and the Pack. It was a success, and the Bells of Rhymny played several more times at the Den, gaining notoriety in the area as a result of the appearances. On August 13, 1966, a popular Michigan column called Deb and Jo. wrote about the band. They wrote, "They're (the band) not just there – they're really good and grab ya! They do a lot of Byrds songs along with the Beatles...These guys are real talents and can arrange songs to their own liking".

By the end of 1966, the band choose to record their first demos at Schiell Recording Studios in Bay City, the same studio that recorded Question Mark and the Mysterians' hit song "96 Tears". They paid Art Schiell, the owner, $15 an hour to use the studios. In the first session, the Bells of Rhymny recorded two original compositions, "She'll Be Back" and "Don't Walk Away". The group returned in the fall of 1966 to record two more original songs called "Rich Man's Woman" and "Now I'm Free". Hoping to release a single, the band took four acetates to Dick Wagner, then a member of the group, the Bossmen. Wagner was impressed by the recordings, especially "She'll Be Back", and, after suggesting an addition of a fuzz-tone to the guitar, he agreed to record a single at the United Sounds Studio, in Detroit.

In January 1967, the Bells of Rhymny recorded their song "She'll Be Back" and the Wagner-penned song, "Wicked Old Witch", as the B-side. A few weeks later, Wagner had the single released on his own Dicto label. The single received extensive airplay in Michigan and propelled the group to regional fame in the area, which resulted in more gigs and, at the Den, the band opened for prominent musical acts including The Amboy Dukes and The Gentrys. Despite the regional success, the band noticed discontent in their guitarist, Burdick. Burdick became increasingly disinterested with the band; As Coughlin recalls he "was more interested in his girlfriend than the band". Nonetheless, Burdick would continue in band activities long enough for their next release.

The band signed Jim Leach as their co-manager.Leach for the past 37 years has known as The Real JIMMY HOLLYWOOD, now living in Los Angeles. He had relations with Question Mark and the Mysterians and, through his connections, the band was able to record at Audio Recorders in Cleveland, Ohio. For their next single, the band enlisted Wagner in writing what would be their biggest hit, "I Cannot Stop You" for their A-side. Before recording began, the band made a major change. Burdick was placed to play the Hammond B3 Organ and Bruce took over lead guitar. Wagner included a horn section and studio musician Don Sheets was brought in to play it. Regarding the song's future success Wagner wrote, "the horns made the record happen". For the B-side, the band re-recorded their old composition "Don't Walk Away" back at Schiell Studios. This version included lyrical changes and an added guitar bridge, as recommended by Wagner.

=== The Cherry Slush ===
The single was put on hold while the band went through personnel changes, and as Leach searched for a record deal. The issue with Burdick reappeared and became detrimental to the band's chemistry. Disagreement between Burdick and the other band members over the band's musical direction led to Burdick's exit from the band and as far as he was concerned, any communication with his former bandmates was permanently severed. The last time any of the band members saw Burdick again was at their high school graduation. To replace Burdick, the band included Charlie Woodward, previously of The Dignitaries, to join as the rhythm guitarist. By the summer of 1967, the band went through its final name change, deeming themselves The Cherry Slush. The name change was put into effect at their next concert at the Den. Woodward did not last long soon after as he enrolled in college, and was quickly replaced by Brian Bennett of The Sons of Sound.

Leach found a small label company, Prophonics Records, to distribute the band's delayed single. Although it was not the major label the band hoped for, a clause in the contract allowed the band to be released from the deal. Either way, the band earned $5,000 for the leasing of the single. Upon its release in January 1968, "I Cannot Stop You" became a regional hit as it received extensive AM airplay. Record deals were offered and the group was close to signing with Columbia Records, however their previous label sold their rights to the Chicago-based label, USA Records. The single charted at number 119 on the Bubbling Under charts of Billboard, number 93 on the Record World charts, and number 35 on the Cashbox charts. In total, the single sold around 75,000 copies.

The Cherry Slush's popularity reached a national scale. They appeared on several shows such as Upbeat, Swinging Time, Swing Lively, and The Swinging Majority. Their touring schedule also reached a grander scale as the band performed all over the United States. In mid-1968, the band began recording for their next single at Chess Records Studios in Southern Michigan Avenue. The A-side, "Day Don't Come" was extensively complete with instrumentals and overdubs. Unbeknownst to The Cherry Slush, their label was facing bankruptcy and on the verge of shutting down. "Day Don't Come" was met with a positive response in the Michigan area, but USA filed for bankruptcy soon after its release. It stalled any record sales for the new single and for "I Cannot Stop You". The band was demoralized from losing their chance at any continued success on the national scale.

In 1969, the band released their final single on Leach's small Chivalry label. Its A-side was a cover of The Beatles' track "Birthday". Around the same time, Underground Sunshine released a cover of the same song, theirs peaking at number 26, nationally. Leach recalls the band released the single under the name "The Slush", believing their usual name could potentially be confused as bubblegum pop. It ruined any opportunity to use the band's recognition to improve sales, and their single only became a hit in Saginaw. After one last gig at the Den in 1969 and recordings among individual band members, The Cherry Slush disbanded as they saw no chance at signing to a major label.

=== Aftermath ===
Dick Coughlin worked as an ER technician for the Saginaw General Hospital for 32 years until his retirement. Dan Parsons joined the Navy and, after being honorably discharged, became educated in law. He works as an attorney in Chicago, Illinois. Gene Bruce worked in his father's company and became the vice-president. He died in 2009. Brian Bennett became an automobile salesman and is the only former member to have continued a consistent music career. Despite suffering a stroke in 2007, he kept performing in the Michigan area. Art Hauffe moved to Florida and owns a construction company. He is also a broker for two other companies. Charlie Woodward also moved to Florida and created his own insurance company. He is now retired and gives music lessons. Mark Burdick lives in Essexville, Michigan and has a career as an F.I. Manager with the Michigan Department of Human Services.

Keyboardist Brian Bennett (born Brian Daniel Bennett on September 24, 1951, in Saginaw, Michigan) died on December 7, 2016, after a lengthy illness, at the age of 65.

=== Legacy ===
The band released an eight-song compilation album called Looking Back in 2001, composed of all the A-sides and B-sides of their four singles. Later in the year, Bruce and Wagner reformed the band for a final concert in front of 2,200 people in a park in Freeland, Michigan. In 2012, "I Cannot Stop You" and "Day Don't Come" were voted into the Legendary Songs of Michigan. In 2013, the band was voted into the Michigan Rock and Roll Legends Hall of Fame.
