= Viv Prince =

English drummer (1941–2025)

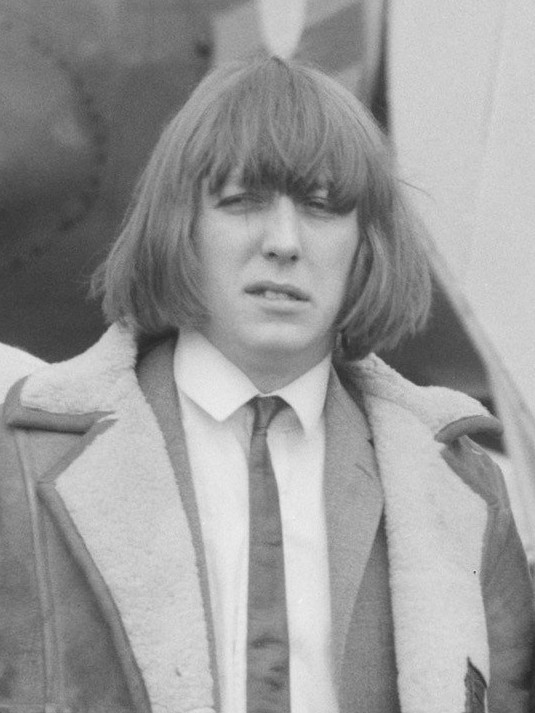
- Prince in 1965

Background information
- Born: 9 August 1941; Loughborough, England
- Died: September 2025 (aged 84) Faro, Portugal
- Genres: Rhythm and blues; rock; jazz
- Occupation: Drummer; percussionist
- Instrument: Drums
- Years active: 1961–2025
- Formerly of: Pretty Things; Carter-Lewis and the Southerners

Vivian Martin Prince (9 August 1941 – September 2025) was an English drummer. He played in a variety of bands during the 1960s, including Pretty Things. He was noted for his wild and eccentric behaviour, which garnered a lot of publicity for the group and influenced Keith Moon.

== Life and career ==
Prince was born in Loughborough, England on 9 August 1941. His father, Harry Prince, played in a local jazz band. Viv's first instrument was a guitar, but then he switched to playing drums. After leaving school, he worked briefly as a tax officer. He also started playing with local jazz bands, including in his father's band as a hobby.

Prince's first professional work as a musician was with the traditional jazz band Lennie Baldwin's Dauphin Street Six in 1961, with whom he toured in Denmark and made his first recordings in 1962. He left them during a tour in Germany to join the Jazz Cardinals. Without a work permit, he soon had to return to London to make a name for himself as a session musician, contributing to many pop records of the era. He joined Carter-Lewis and the Southerners in June 1963, with whom he recorded three singles, including the hit "Your Momma's Out of Town" alongside Jimmy Page. Around this time, he became the first British rock musician against a drug-related charge that was brought up in court. As a skilled professional with an extrovert, unorthodox drumming style and considerable entertainment value, Prince was repeatedly approached by young British rock bands – such as the Kinks – to become their drummer. In 1964, he was persuaded by Pretty Things management to join, thus completing its first iconic lineup, and played the drums on their first two albums The Pretty Things and Get the Picture?, which were both released in 1965.

The Pretty Things often made the headlines for their wild antics, which were due in no small part to Prince. Often inebriated or high on amphetamines, he would leave his drum stool to roam around the stage, and generally cause havoc wherever he went. A young Keith Moon attended several Pretty Things concerts to study Prince's style, according to Jimmy Page. Prince was also the one to coin the nickname "Moon the Loon" for Keith, whom with Brian Jones, Dave Davies, John Entwistle, P. J. Proby, and the Beatles, were on friendly terms with. The mayhem culminated in a tour of New Zealand in August 1965, during which he paraded around in a leopard-skin pillbox hat, carrying around a dead crayfish on a string and started plotting pranks and setting fires onstage, which resulted in a large amount of bad publicity. Following an altercation with the crew, he was thrown off the plane that was taking the band home after the tour, and had to make his own way back to England. He missed recording sessions more and more often, and the band had to call upon other drummers to replace him, including Bobby Graham, Mitch Mitchell and Twink. His tenure with the Pretty Things ended in mid-November 1965, when the band sacked him due to his growing unreliability. He was replaced by Skip Alan.

After leaving the Pretty Things, Prince played with the Bunch of Fives and the Denny Laine String Band. He also deputised on drums during concerts for the Honeycombs, the Who, and Hawkwind and was considered to become a drummer for the Jeff Beck Group. For some time, he ran the Knuckles club in Soho, London that as he claimed, served as the first rehearsal base for Jimi Hendrix in England. Prince also claimed that he suggested musicians to complete the lineup of the Jimi Hendrix Experience. During the second half of the 1960s, he contributed to LPs by Chris Barber (at the session led by Paul McCartney), Twink and McGough & McGear (also joined by Jimi Hendrix), as well as released a few singles as a member of the bands, such as VAMP (with Pete Sears and members of Hutchinson Clark), Kate and a solo single "Light of the Charge Brigade".

Prince was also reported to be involved in the election campaign activity for Screaming Lord Sutch's Monster Raving Loony Party and he was reported to be expelled from the members of Hell's Angels for bad behaviour. He also underwent a few trial cases, and survived a fire in his house.

During the 1980s, Prince returned to Loughborough for a while, playing with local soul band Sugar Shack. In 2005, he was living near Faro, Portugal. The Pretty Things wrote and recorded "Vivian Prince," a song in homage to him, on their album ... Rage Before Beauty, released in 1999.

On 7 September 2025, it was announced that Prince had died earlier that week, at his home in Faro, Portugal, at the age of 84.

== Discography ==
- 1965: Pretty Things – The Pretty Things
- 1965: Pretty Things – Get the Picture?
- 1966: Viv Prince – "Light of the Charge Brigade" / "Minuet for Ringo"
- 1966: Chicago Line – "Shimmy Shimmy Ko Ko Bop" / "Jump Back"
- 1966: The Bunch of Fives – "I Go Home Baby" / "At the Station"
- 1968: Vamp – "Floatin'" / "Thinkin' Too Much"
- 1969: Vamp – "Green Pea" / "Wake Up and Tell Me"
- 1969: Kate – Shout It / Sweet Little Thing

== Sources ==
- Stax, Mike; Neill, Andy; Baker, John (2006). Don't Bring Me Down... Under: The Pretty Things in New Zealand, 1965. San Diego: UT Publishing. ISBN 0-9778166-0-5.
