= Get the Picture? (The Pretty Things album) =

Studio album by Pretty Things
- Released: December 1965
- Recorded: 1965
- Studio: Philips (London)
- Genres: Garage rock, rhythm and blues
- Length: 29:50
- Label: Fontana
- Producers: Bobby Graham; Glyn Johns

Pretty Things chronology
Rainin' in My Heart (1965)	Get the Picture? (1965)	Emotions (1967)

Get the Picture? is the second album by the English rock band Pretty Things, released in 1965.

== Recording ==
Get the Picture? was recorded quickly as a follow-up to the group's debut album The Pretty Things. Jimmy Page co-wrote the album's opening song "You Don’t Believe Me".

== Release ==
A CD reissue, which was remastered from the original session tapes, expanded the album to 18 tracks, with the addition of songs recorded in the same sessions for singles or extended plays. In 2023, all 13 of the band's studio albums were included in the box set The Complete Studio Albums 1965-2020.

== Reception ==
Professional ratings
Review scores
Source	Rating
AllMusic	4.5/5 stars

AllMusic wrote that Get the Picture? was "a record that's just a few notches short of Rolling Stones level in the charisma department" and that "Pretty Things approach Rolling Stones' territory, and even in their off moments, they're flying at the same level as the Kinks' album tracks." Uncut, in a review of the band's studio albums box set, said that the album "showed they were eager to grow".

== Track listing ==
Side A
No.	Title	Writer(s)	Length
1.	"You Don't Believe Me"	Phil May; Bobby Graham; Jimmy Page; Willie Morrell	2:24
2.	"Buzz the Jerk"	May; Dick Taylor	1:55
3.	"Get the Picture?"	May; Taylor	1:56
4.	"Can't Stand the Pain"	May; Taylor; Graham	2:42
5.	"Rainin' in My Heart"	James Moore; Jerry West	2:33
6.	"We'll Play House"	May; Taylor	2:34
Total length:			13:55

Side B
No.	Title	Writer(s)	Length
7.	"You'll Never Do It, Baby"	Brian Smith; Terry Fox	2:29
8.	"I Had a Dream"	Jimmy Witherspoon	2:59
9.	"I Want Your Love"	Johnnie Dee; Johnny Tarr	2:18
10.	"London Town"	Tim Hardin	2:28
11.	"Cry to Me"	Bert Russell	2:53
12.	"Gonna Find Me a Substitute"	Ike Turner	2:59
Total length:			15:53
