= The Fairies (British band) =

1960s British R&B band

- Origin: Colchester, England
- Genres: Freakbeat; rhythm and blues; beat
- Years active: 1963–1966
- Labels: Decca, His Master's Voice
- Past members: John 'Twink' Alder; Dane Stephens; Mick Weaver; John Acutt; John Gandy; Nik Wymer

The Fairies were a British rhythm and blues and freakbeat band led by drummer John "Twink" Alder. They recorded three singles between 1964 and 1965.

== History ==
The group began in Colchester, Essex in 1963 as Dane Stephens and the Deep Beats. After a year, the band evolved into the Fairies. The band consisted of Dane Stephens (born Douglas Robert Ord) on vocals and blues harp, John "Akky" Acutt (formerly of the Strangers) on lead guitar, Mick "Wimps" Weaver (Note: Not the same-named organ player also known as Wynder K Frog.) on rhythm guitar and fiddle, John Frederick "Freddy' Gandy on bass and John "Twink" Alder on drums (also formerly of the Strangers).

In late 1964, the Fairies recorded the single "Don't Think Twice It's Alright" for the Decca label. Around the same time, the band made newspaper headlines when members were arrested for climbing up a statue. Twink later recalled:

"With Dane Stephens, our shows were not only blues but soul numbers, touches of jazz as well. He was an amazing singer, very very special. Had a great voice, played amazing blues harp, the Fairies were just about to break big." "Dane Stephens was involved in a fatal accident while he was driving the group van - without any license or insurance. He served time in jail, so we lost him for a year and got Nik Wymer from Nix Nomads instead. We had been actually about to break at that point, there was no doubt about it. We had Mickie Most producing us in the studio, we had a single out and another one on the way, an agent who was getting us booked back again everywhere - we were good, a really good R&B band."

In 1965, after Wymer replaced Stephens as singer, they recorded two more singles, "Get Yourself Home" and "Don't Mind", for His Master's Voice. "Get Yourself Home" was written by Johnnie Dee, road manager for the Fairies, but rejected by the Pretty Things and recorded by the Fairies instead; previously, Dee's song "Don't Bring Me Down" had been rejected by the Fairies but became a hit for the Pretty Things in 1964. Twink: "We became like the Pretty Things when Nik Wymer came along - mostly because Nik looked and sounded so much like Phil May... and then after [Dane Stephens] came out Nik left and we got Dane back but we were really trying to recreate something which we'd already lost." Nik Wymer briefly joined an embryonic group formed by ex-members of Them in late 1965. Brian 'Smudger' Smith from Watford R&B band 'Cops 'n' Robbers' may have sung with the band at some point, as Dane Stephens reportedly swapped to become Cops 'n' Robbers singer around late 1965 and possibly sang on their final single "It's All Over Now, Baby Blue".

The Fairies split at some date before 1967, Twink having already departed and joined London band the In-Crowd in August 1966. This band evolved into Tomorrow, and from there Twink joined the Pretty Things and the Pink Fairies before launching a solo career. Dane Stephens recorded under the pseudonym 'Zion De Gallier' for Tomorrow producer Mark Wirtz. Freddie Gandy joined Bluesology alongside Long John Baldry, Elton Dean and Reggie Dwight (Elton John), followed by a late line-up of Sam Gopal in 1969 and Hookfoot in the early 1970s. Twink reunited with Stephens and Weaver on his 1991 album Odds & Beginnings, which included the tracks "Anytime at All", "Don't Bring Me Down", "Get Yourself Home" and "Boot Black". The Ipswich-based Nik Wymer Band (NWB) released the album Time Will Tell in 2009.

== Discography ==
Singles

- "Don't Think Twice It's Alright" / "Anytime at All" - 7" single (1964), Decca
- "Get Yourself Home" / "I'll Dance" - 7" single (1965), His Master's Voice
- "Don't Mind" / "Baby Don't" - 7" single (1965), His Master's Voice

Zion De Gallier (Dane Stephens) singles

- "Me" / "Winter Will Be Cold" - 7" single (1968), Parlophone
- "Dream Dream Dream" / "Geraldine" - 7" single (1968), Parlophone
