= Bobby Graham (musician) =

English drummer (1940–2009)

- Born: Robert Francis Neate; 11 March 1940; Edmonton, North London, England
- Died: 14 September 2009 (aged 69) Welwyn Garden City, Hertfordshire, England
- Occupations: Session musician, drummer
- Instrument: Drums
- Years active: 1960s–2009
- Website: www.bobbygraham.co.uk

Bobby Graham (born Robert Francis Neate, 11 March 1940 – 14 September 2009) was an English session drummer, composer, arranger and record producer. Shel Talmy, who produced the Kinks, David Bowie and the Who, described Graham as "the greatest drummer the UK has ever produced."

== Biography ==
Born at North Middlesex Hospital, Edmonton, north London, England, Graham became a member of the Outlaws and worked with Joe Meek. He left to join work with Joe Brown in 1961. Graham was a part of the British elite session team (comparable to the American "Wrecking Crew") made up of artists such as Big Jim Sullivan, Vic Flick and Jimmy Page.

In 1962, while touring with Joe Brown in Liverpool, Graham was asked to replace Pete Best in the Beatles. However, Graham was not interested in working with a Liverpudlian band with no chart success.

Graham played on 13 number one singles, including those by the Dave Clark Five, Engelbert Humperdinck, Peter and Gordon, Jackie Trent, the Kinks, Tom Jones and Dusty Springfield, and appeared on a total of 40 UK top five hits (10 number two hits; 4 number 3 hits; 6 number 4 hits; 7 number five hits; 107 top 50 hits – 1155 days in the charts). In a discography that counts approximately 15,000 titles, he played on hits by John Barry, Shirley Bassey, Joe Cocker, Billy Fury, Herman's Hermits, Benny Hill, Rod Stewart, Dave Berry, Joe Brown and the Bruvvers, Chubby Checker, the Kinks, Petula Clark, Brenda Lee, Lulu, Brian Poole & the Tremeloes, the Pretty Things, PJ Proby, Van Morrison, Them, the Walker Brothers, and Marianne Faithfull.

Graham also toured the UK as drummer in his own jazz band.

== Death ==
On 14 September 2009, Bobby Graham died at the Isabel Hospice in Welwyn Garden City, Hertfordshire, England after battling stomach cancer for five months. He was 69.

== Recording credits ==
Graham played on over 15,000 titles, including:

- "You Really Got Me", "All Day And All Of The Night" and "Tired of Waiting For You" by the Kinks
- "Good Morning Little Schoolgirl" by Rod Stewart
- "Downtown" and "I Know A Place" by Petula Clark
- "Green Green Grass of Home" by Tom Jones
- "Gloria" and "Baby, Please Don't Go" by Them (ft. Van Morrison)
- "I Only Want to Be with You" by Dusty Springfield
- "I Believe" by the Bachelors
- "Is It True" by Brenda Lee. Produced by Mickie Most in 1964.
- "Glad All Over" and "Bits and Pieces" by the Dave Clark Five

== Recordings as a leader ==
- The Bobby Graham Band: The Session Man liner notes by Patrick Harrington, (Broom House Publishing Ltd., 12 Nov 2004) - ISBN 0-9549142-0-1
