= Limelight (club night) =

Coordinates: 51°30′58″N 0°8′7.3″W

Limelight is a classical club night that is held at the 100 Club, in Soho, London. The event aims to broaden the appeal of classical music by presenting artists in an intimate, "rock & roll" environment, undermining conventional notions that classical music needs to be heard in a formal concert hall to be enjoyed.

Unlike traditional concerts, artists are encouraged to speak to the audience about their music choices and stay for a drink and chat at the bar afterwards. The 100 Club was chosen for the event because of its rich history. Since its opening in 1942, it has seen numerous performances from some of the biggest names in jazz and rock, including Louis Armstrong, Billie Holiday, the Sex Pistols and the Rolling Stones. However, the club has never before hosted classical music.

== History ==
Limelight was founded in July 2009 by two young women in the classical music industry: Emily Freeman and Milly Olykan. Speaking to Muso magazine in October 2009, Olykan said: "I don't go to many classical concerts, and when I do I think of it as a difficult environment. People are stuck rigidly in rows miles from the performers, and you need so much prior knowledge even to understand the programme. The artists never chat to the audience, and the whole thing is very intimidating and impersonal. When I talked to Emily, who has worked with many classical acts, she said several artists had already shown an interest in working in smaller venues, so I thought there was an opportunity there. It was like merging two worlds in one."

Several Brit and Emmy award winners have appeared at Limelight so far, with some returning for repeat appearances. Artists have included Leif Ove Andsnes, Natasha Paremski, Joanna MacGregor, Nicola Benedetti, Jack Liebeck, Daniel Hope, Charlie Siem, Natalie Clein and Matthew Barley.

In December 2010, Times columnist Giles Coren attended a night and said afterwards: "Limelight avoids the tedium of a restaurant, the horror of a ‘gig’ and the pole-up-your-arse stiffness of most classical venues, and provides something genuinely original, fun and really rather classy."

Limelight has been featured in several magazines and newspapers, including The Guardian Guide, Financial Times, Evening Standard, Metro, Muso magazine, Classical Music magazine, Classic FM Magazine, Time Out and Music Teacher magazine. The night has been supported by Classic FM, with presenter Nick Bailey as one of its most dedicated attendees. BBC Radio 3's In Tune programme has also run a feature on the night, along with Robert Elms' BBC London show.

In March 2010, the Jacaranda Ensemble – five young principals of the Brandenburger Symphoniker – drove over 1,000 miles from Germany, with a didgeridoo, percussion kit and two 10ft alpenhorns, to perform at the night.

In July 2010, Limelight changed its regular format to host "Limelight Presents New Artists", a competition to find the next wave of classical talent. Dozens of youngsters from music schools across the country applied, and the four winners performed at the 100 Club to over 100 peers, music industry professionals and members of the public.
