= Cracking the Code =

- Cover shot by Pattie Boyd

Studio album by Stephen Dale Petit
- Released: 2013
- Recorded: Blackbird Studios, Sputnik Sound, Barbershop Studios, Music Shed Studios, Smokehouse London, 2kHz Studios, Headquarters London
- Genre: Blues; new blues; blues rock; rock
- Label: 333 Records Ltd
- Producer: Stephen Dale Petit

Stephen Dale Petit chronology
| Stephen Dale Petit At High Voltage (2012) | Cracking the Code (2013) | 2020 Visions (2020) |

Cracking the Code is the third studio album (and fifth album) by Stephen Dale Petit, released on 15 September 2013 and recorded primarily at Blackbird Studios in Nashville. It was recorded by Grammy award-winning producer Vance Powell and consists of eleven original songs. The album features appearances from several notable guests including Howlin’ Wolf guitarist Hubert Sumlin, Dr. John, former Rolling Stones guitarist Mick Taylor and Patrick Carney of The Black Keys. Hubert Sumlin's contribution proved to be the last music he made prior to his death on 4 December 2011.

Recorded in analogue to tape, Petit described the album as "vinyl-centric", with the track running order chosen specifically to fit the Side A and Side B vinyl format.

== Pre-production and recording sessions at Blackbird Studios ==
Petit began writing material for Cracking the Code in the first half of 2011. In an interview with Blues Matters magazine, Petit spoke of his initial plans for the album:

"After The Crave I'd got a good idea of what I wanted the next album to sound like - which was to have the crackle of a live album in a studio setting with some boundary-pushing sonic experiences based around guitar-driven, blues-based music. I didn't want a set of well-recorded songs, I wanted something with a noise of its own, some sort of character."

In order to realise his vision, Petit approached producer Vance Powell to work on the album. Petit was drawn to Powell due to his work with Jack White and was particularly impressed by Vance's production ethos with The Dead Weather:

"He was already doing some of those things [I wanted]… He’s got what Eddie Kramer or Sam Phillips had back in the day… he encourages you to try new sounds and ideas… Before we began ["Muzzle"] I said to Vance "I want this song to sound like a monster" and he just said "OK". He knew exactly what to do."

Pre-production rehearsals for the album were undertaken throughout Spring 2011 and in August 2011 Petit and his band flew out to Blackbird Studios in Nashville to track the album. The recording sessions for tracking lasted for five days, with Petit staying behind for another three to begin overdubs.

Capturing the live sound of the band was a central priority for Petit. Talking with Blues Matters, he explained "I wanted to get that thing that you can get with people who know each other just playing in a room." The band tracked the album live, performing in the same room and using microphone placement to help capture the ambience and natural reverbs of the room. In an interview with Musicosis, Petit revealed he wanted the record to sound as "organic" as possible.

Petit's production ethos for Cracking The Code was in keeping with his mission to present the blues in a modern way, push boundaries and deliver something new to the audience, he revealed to Guitar & Bass Magazine: "When The Stones’ Satisfaction was first heard it was completely extraordinary. There was never anything like it before. I am striving to get there and in some instances I think we achieved it - with "Muzzle" and "Slideway" certainly... Somebody listening to "Slideway" said about halfway through "Are my speakers damaged? Is it supposed to sound like that?" I was so happy because I did want it to sound like that - shards of sound and untidiness in the distortion. I didn’t want it to be polished." Petit also wanted to try a new "less is more" tact when it came to tracking guitar on the album - while previous album The Crave had featured multiple layers of guitar tracks, Petit's aim with Cracking The Code was different, he explained: "I wanted to reach a place where there is one guitar that is massive and huge… I didn’t want the distortion to be tidy; I wanted it to be ragged".

Upon returning to London, Petit experienced a "mental blockage" which left him temporarily unable to finish some of the songs for Cracking The Code: "Some of the songs were finished, some of the songs had the hook without the verse, and some had no lyrics at all. I wanted to make sure that the lyrics matched the calibre of the music."

After watching a documentary about Paul Simon's Graceland, in which Simon discusses his struggle to finish the album, Petit found the inspiration needed to complete the lyrics for Cracking the Code: "What unpicked it for me was watching one of those Classic Album documentaries on TV about Graceland with Paul Simon going through the same thing: coming back from South Africa with some tracks that were half completed and not many lyrics. He even contemplated putting Graceland out as an instrumental album because he thought he might ruin it. And I thought "if someone of that calibre can go through that and come out the other side then I certainly can."

Petit turned the delay to his advantage and arranged recording sessions with Hubert Sumlin and Dr. John.

== Album guest appearances ==
=== Recording session with Hubert Sumlin ===
The recording sessions with Hubert Sumlin saw Petit travel to Barbershop Studios, New Jersey in November 2011. Taking material recorded at Blackbird with him, Petit had originally planned for Sumlin to guest on "Get You Off" and for the pair of them to then record a second song from scratch.

Unfortunately, Sumlin's deteriorating health led to the session ending earlier than planned. Sumlin overdubbed guitar parts on "Get You Off" but the pair did not have the opportunity to record a finished version of the second collaborative song. This song later became "Hubert’s Blues". Despite Sumlin's evident fragility, his impressive musicianship remained intact even during his final weeks: "I had to help him up the stairs but when I put a guitar in his hands he was like a different man."

Petit further elaborated to Guitar & Bass Magazine: "I placed my [Gibson SG] in his hands and he instantly changed. He became really animated… half an hour later he said, "it’s mine, it's going home with me!" It was the last guitar he ever played."

After Sumlin had left the studio, Petit used the remainder of the session to record guitar parts for the collaborative piece himself, channeling Sumlin’s riffs from earlier run throughs and using Sumlin’s amplifier. Following Sumlin’s death, Petit set about turning the recording into an homage and suitable tribute to Sumlin, bringing in revered bluesmen Dr. John, Chris Barber and Mick Taylor to play on the song, now titled "Hubert’s Blues".

"I bumped into Dr. John, who was supposed to play at [Hubert’s] memorial, but hadn’t, and I had this stuff, which was the last music Hubert ever made… so I felt a duty of care. I asked [Dr. John] to help me finish it and he agreed."

Hubert Sumlin died 13 days after the recording session for Cracking The Code and the album captures his last ever recorded performance. Sumlin also posthumously provided inspiration for lead-off single "Holla". Petit recalled: "I’m thinking… it’s a shame we’ve got all these people celebrating [Hubert] and he’s not on [Hubert’s Blues]. So I went back to the tape of Hubert and I arranging the song and picked out the bits that might work. And then there was this riff that came blaring out that I had scarcely noticed. And that became the basis of Holla. That’s Hubert coming out of the right speaker and me on the left."

During the session, Sumlin made a point of waiting for the two of them to be alone before saying to Petit "I’ll tell you something Steve…you can play! You can not only play, but, if a lot of people could play like you, shit, I’d sit back and smile."

Petit commented that the recording session with Sumlin was "life-changing".

In tribute to Sumlin, "HCS 4eva" (Hubert Charles Sumlin) is etched into the run out groove of all vinyl copies of the album.

=== Recording session with Dr. John ===
Introduced to Dr. John by mutual friends, Petit mentioned his idea to create a musical tribute for Hubert Sumlin and asked Dr. John to play organ on the track. In Autumn 2012, Petit flew to New Orleans for the session. Dr. John appears on both "Hubert’s Blues" and "Get You Off".

=== Other guests ===
The album also features Patrick Carney on drums in lead-off track "Holla", whom Petit met after a show by Carney’s band The Black Keys. Carney resides in Nashville, where the album was recorded.

Guitarist Mick Taylor and jazz trombonist Chris Barber also appear on the album and have been long-term collaborators with Petit since their involvement in his successful campaign to "Save The 100 Club" in December 2010. Their contributions were recorded at Petit’s home studio in late 2012.

Mick Taylor spoke of Cracking The Code to Guitar & Bass Magazine: "I went to see Bill Wyman’s Rhythm Kings and when I went to meet Bill backstage there were a few guitar fanatics there. A few of them said "we really enjoyed your playing on the Stephen Dale Petit album" it was nice to be paid compliments for something other than what I did with the Rolling Stones but something just as important."

The lyrics on the album were written by Petit except "Shotgun Venus", which saw another collaboration between Petit and performance poet Pete Brown, famed for his songwriting with British blues rock pioneers Cream in the 1960s (they previously co-wrote the title track on Petit's album The Crave).

Commenting on the album's guest appearances, UK music journalist Henry Yates wrote that Petit keeps "hallowed company, but [he] is their equal."

== Post-production, limited edition vinyl and album artwork ==
Cracking the Code was recorded, mixed, mastered and cut from analogue tape in Nashville. The album was mastered by Richard Dodd and cut by George Ingram at Nashville Record Productions.

It was released on CD, digital download and black vinyl with a special limited edition, heavyweight pressing of 333 signed and numbered red vinyl copies. All vinyl albums were issued with a gatefold sleeve and oversized lyric booklet handwritten by Petit himself.

Petit discussed his choice of title for the album with Guitar & Bass magazine:

"I once heard an acclaimed songwriter say creating a song comes in any number of ways; it’s just finding a way in, spending time with it and allowing it to come to fruition… she called it "cracking the code". Once I decided on the title, it became clear that it meant a lot of things. And so I let that happen." The conclusive factor in deciding the title was Vance Powell arriving in London for the vocal sessions with a book in his luggage about Bletchley Park - the former site of the United Kingdom’s Government Code and Cypher School, which was responsible for cracking the secret codes of the Axis powers during WWII including the German Enigma Code. Petit has stated that this was "a coincidence that confirmed the choice."

=== Album artwork ===
The album artwork, shot in Hill Garden, Hampstead Heath, draws inspiration from seminal rock album design company Hipgnosis. Upon inadvertently discovering the location for the cover, Petit presented his ideas for the cover to Hipgnosis principle Storm Thorgerson, aiming to collaborate with the legendary album cover artist for the shoot. This did not materialise due to Thorgerson's deteriorating health. Discussing the new album with iconic rock photographer and guitarists’ muse Pattie Boyd, it was decided that she would photograph the cover image. After Petit presented his initial mock-up shots to Boyd, work began on location in Spring 2013. The shot features Petit seemingly walking on water, surrounded by white balloons suspended in mid-air. Petit has since revealed that it was Boyd who suggested he stand in the middle of the pond featured in the image to create the illusion. "There’s nothing faked. I’m actually standing on a table with about a millimetre of water beneath my shoe. Those balloons are suspended by bricks and tied with fishing line." The white balloons featured on the album artwork were specifically arranged into three groups of three balloons to represent the number sequence 333.

In keeping with the album's title, the gatefold sleeve of Cracking The Code includes numerous secret codes in various forms. At the top of the gatefold, written in braille, is the phrase "blues is truth". The bottom of the sleeve features "blues is truth" written in numeric code. Similarly, the album credits also contains a red letter code that spells out "blues is truth" in anagram format.

== Critical reception and press coverage ==
Critical praise for Cracking the Code was consistent, with most leading press outlets agreeing that Petit's third studio album was a showcase for his "formidable"ongwriting skills and his "fiendish guitar chops" s. Blues Matters magazine commented that the album transported Petit "to the next level". Legendary UK music journalist Charles Shaar Murray agreed, deeming the album Petit's "graduation piece". Writing for The Blues, Shaar Murray notes: "[Petit] rises to the challenge that most New Blues players are guitarists first, singers second and songwriters a distant, trailing third. Previous records established his credentials as guitar hero and ace blues geek, but now he’s found his voice."

Cracking the Code received an 8/10 star review in Classic Rock as well as being listed as one of the magazine's best albums of 2013. Hi-Fi News magazine awarded the Vinyl release of Cracking The Code a score of 88/100, describing the album as "an excellent modern blues LP… a fiery, kick-ass session". MOJO magazine's 4/5 star review described the album as "thrusting blues hooligan anthems… an inspired and unapologetically loud affair." In its review, The Daily Express commented "the whole history of blues, certainly electric blues, is on this album" and added that "Petit’s electrifying guitar and gutsy vocals are the drive behind this musical tour de force… he’s a master craftsman at the top of his game." Pre-eminent UK guitar magazine Guitar & Bass ran a five-page feature on Petit following the album's release and described Petit as "another Jack White at work".

== Singles ==
Lead single "Holla" circulated on BBC Radio 2, including plays on The Paul Jones show, The Bob Harris show and Gideon Coe. "Holla" also appeared on the compilation disc The Black Keys and Friends for the June 2014 issue of MOJO magazine. MOJO Editor in Chief Phil Alexander played Cracking The Code on his own syndicated MOJO Rocks Radio Show, naming it album of the week and playing most of the album over a two-month period.

Follow up single "My Friend Bob" also featured on BBC Radio nationwide. The Times described the song as "ultra-catchy" and included it in their "hottest tracks" playlist. "My Friend Bob" received a 5/5 star rating from The Express, writing that the single was "a standout track, one hundred per cent toe-tapping… once heard it never fails to bring a smile." Rough Trade West record store in London participated in a viral promotional campaign for "My Friend Bob" offering 33 free copies of the single in store.

== Track listing ==
1. "Holla" (Petit)
2. "Wonder" (Petit)
3. "Get You Off" (Petit, Odiwe)
4. "Hard To Love You" (Petit)
5. "Approximately Perfect Heartbreak" (Petit)
6. "Muzzle" (Petit, Knight, Weinriech, Odiwe)
7. "Riot City" (Petit, Williams, Moody, Odiwe)
8. "Shotgun Venus" (Petit, Brown)
9. "Slideway" (Petit)
10. "My Friend Bob" (Petit)
11. "Hubert’s Blues" (Petit)

== Personnel and credits ==
- Stephen Dale Petit - guitar, vocals
- Hubert Sumlin - lead guitar "Get You Off", second guitar on "Holla"
- Mick Taylor - third guitar on "Holla", second guitar on "Hubert’s Blues"
- Dr. John - keyboards on "Get You Off", organ on "Hubert’s Blues"
- Chris Barber - trombone on "Hubert’s Blues"
- Angela Brooks - backing vocals on "Holla", "Get You Off" and "Hubert’s Blues"
- Andy Caine - backing vocals on "Holla"
- Patrick Carney - drums on "Holla"
- Jack Greenwood - drums on "Hubert’s Blues" and "Holla"
- Sam Odiwe - bass
- Jon Moody - keyboards
- Chris Williams - drums

Technical

- Recorded, engineered and mixed by Vance Powell
- Recorded at Blackbird Studios, Nashville
- Additional Engineering by Jonathan McMillan, Chris Finney, Ian Grimble, Jim Spencer, Jason Corsar, Nuno Fernandes
- Additional recording at Sputnik Sound Nashville, Barbershop Studios New Jersey, Music Shed Studios New Orleans, Smokehouse London, 2 kHz London and

Headquarters London

- Mixed at Sputnik Sound Nashville
- Produced by Stephen Dale Petit
