= Roberto Manzin =

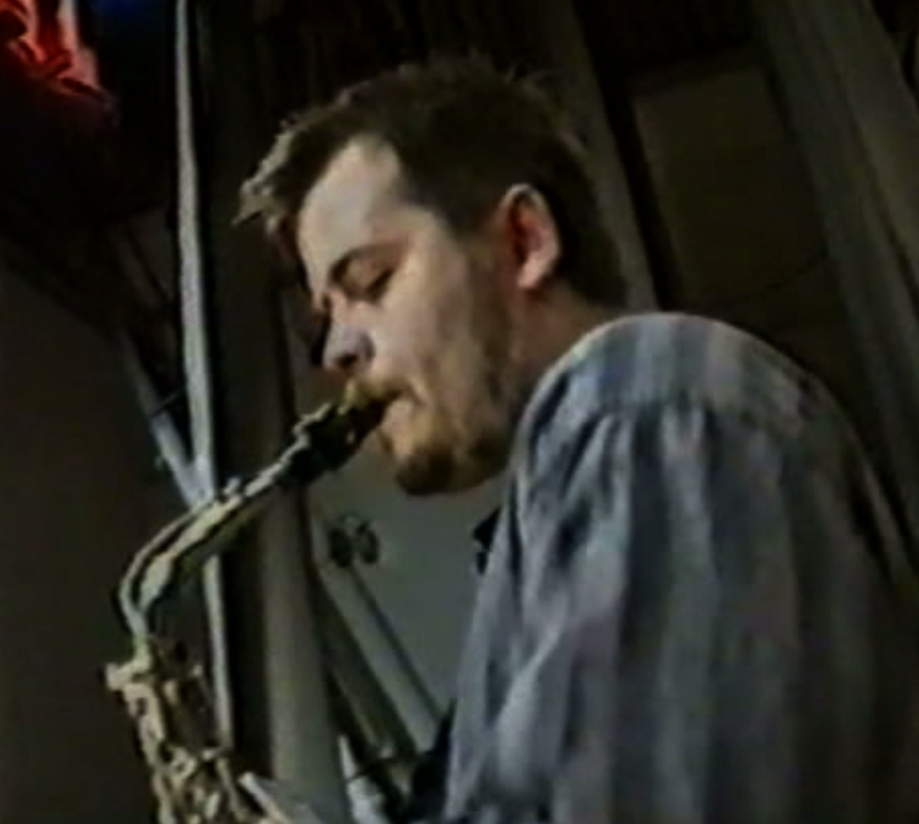
- Roberto Manzin

Background information
- Born: Roberto Luciano Adriano Manzin; 8 July 1966 (age 60)
- Origin: Rome, Italy
- Genres: Pop, Latin, funk, jazz
- Instruments: Alto saxophone, soprano saxophone, tenor saxophone, clarinet, EWI, piano
- Website: http://www.robertomanzin.com

Roberto Manzin (born 8 July 1966) is an alto, tenor and soprano saxophones, clarinet, EWI, piano player and composer.

== Biography ==
Roberto Manzin was born on 8 July 1966 in Rome, Italy, of Eastern European refugees who were also musicians. His musical life began in Milan where he moved with his family when he was five, he studied music privately and then at the school Civica Scuola di Musica Villa Simonetta.

During the 1980s Manzin begun playing in several music clubs in Milan, and during the 1990s was part of the Tony Scott Jazz Quintet (Scott being an American bebop clarinet player who performed with Charlie Parker and Billie Holiday). Manzin became a successful session player, contributing to eight albums in 1992 alone, with leading Italian artists as well as featuring in several TV commercials (Invicta, BMW, TV Sorrisi e Canzoni, etc.). Manzin performed regularly in Milan jazz clubs such as Il Capolinea, Le Scimmie, Tangram, with Italian jazz musicians such as Renato Sellani, Bruno De Filippi, Gianni Cazzola, Tullio De Piscopo, Giorgio Buratti and Marco Ratti. In the same period he toured with the Italian singer Enzo Jannacci and the American artist Gene Anthony Ray (who played the role of Leroy Johnson in Fame). Manzin also worked extensively in TV where he played with, among others, James Brown, Zucchero Fornaciari and Manu Katché. In the late 1990s Manzin migrated to London, where he continued his musical activity. Over the years Manzin has performed and/or recorded with Martha Reeves and the Vandelas, Donna Summer, Dave Weckl, Jim Mullen, Harvie S, Pino Palladino, Trilok Gurtu, Kai Eckhardt, Dennis Rollins, Roberto Pla, Roland Perrin, Richard Bailey, Ernesto Simpson, Nicolas Meier, Jason Rebello, Ska Cubano, Manolín "El Médico de la salsa", Jesus Cutiño, Omar Puente, Alejandro Sanz, Rumer, Ismael Rivera Jr, Max Carletti, Carmel, Mario Biondi, Space UK, Dave Land, Adrian Reid; Maysa Leak, Francesco Lo Castro, Sid Gauld and Francesco Mendolia (from Incognito) and many others. Manzin continues to be a popular session player (he recorded on eight albums in 2010, ranging in style from Pop to Latin, Rock/Blues, Ska and Jazz) and appears in music festivals throughout Europe, as well as performing regularly at many venues around Europe.

== Discography ==
=== As leader and co-leader ===
- Roberto Manzin, Redbeetroots 'Blue Feather' 2021
- Roberto Manzin, Davide Incorvaia 'Freedom Chant' EP 2021
- Roberto Manzin 'LifeFlight' 2016
- Roberto Manzin - Francesco Lo Castro 'Improfives' Manzin - Lo Castro HMP 2010
- Giorgio Serci - Roberto Manzin 'Silver Lining' Seadas Records 2009
- Roberto Manzin 'Sax Project' Duck Record 1989

=== As sideman ===
- Joel Holmes - Into The Abyss 2023
- Unidentified Flying Project by Simon Wood Harris "95 OF 1" 2023
- Terence Collie '384,400' 2023
- Llareggub 'Llareggub' MoPaChi Records 2017
- Dan Banks 'Two In a Box' 2017
- Jordan & The Gigolos 'Covered Up' 2017
- Malafede Trio 'Touche' 2016
- Eliane Correa 'En El Aire' 2016
- Wild Card 'Organic Riot' Top End Records 2015
- Calvin Gudu 'Above All' PraiseWorth Records 2013
- Mario Biondi (musician) 'Mario Christmas' Sony 2013
- Laura Mvula 'Sing To The Moon' RCA Victor 2013
- Wymondham College Jazz Orchestra 'Birdland' 2012
- Wild Card 'Everything Changes' Top End Records 2012
- Filipe Monteiro 'In Bad Company' 2012
- David Sharp 'Now And Then - Songs & Instrumental - Part 1 & 2' Sonoton 2012
- Romina De Luca 'DeCantare' Edel 2011
- Rom D Collective 'Energy in Motion' 2011
- Stephen Dale Petit 'The BBC Sessions' 333 Records, BBC 2011
- David Lawrence Atkins 'Spitting On A Fish' 2011
- Petty Cash & the trash 'The Dogs Need Valium' 2011
- Rumer (musician) 'Seasons of My Soul' Atlantic Records 2010
- Jon Scott 'Flow like a river' Brown Babes Music 2010
- Stephen Dale Petit 'The Crave' 333 Records Ltd 2010
- The Red Reverend 'Spacejazz Hymnbook Vol. 1' RedReverend 2010
- Contigo en la distancia 'Contigo en la distancia' RTZ 2010
- Ska Cubano 'Mambo Ska' Casino Sounds 2010
- Federico Malaman 'Enjoy with me!' 2010
- Jon Scott 'Give Me A Call' Brown Babes Music 2009
- Mario Biondi (musician) 'If' Tattica 2009
- Gino Marcelli 'Suoni Confusi' Do It Yourself Music Group S.r.l. 2009
- Stephen Dale Petit 'Guitararama' 333 Records Ltd. 2007
- Luciano Gattinoni 'La mela rossa' Rugginenti Editore 2007
- 'ZoogaJazz Three' Zoog a Music 2007
- Mauro Gazzola 'On The Road. Fusion Music Voyage' NAR International 2006
- Franco Morgia 'La musica o l'amore' Idea 2006
- Gaetano Borgo 'Se uno vuol essere il primo...' ELLEDICI 2006
- Yano 'Alegria' Self 2005
- 'Zoog a Jazz' Zoog a Music 2005
- Victor Hugo la banda 'Topicalisimo' Las records 2002
- Antonio Forcione 'Ghetto Paradise' NAIM Label 1999
- Shashi & friends 'Longing' Happy Times Unlimited 1999
- Arno Stubel 'Passage to Argentina' Tring 1997
- Alejandro Sanz 'Más (album)' Wea/Latina (Warner Music Group) 1997
- Graecia 'Keep The Faith' Mercury Records (Germany) 1996
- Petty Cash and the Trash 'It still fits' Patricia A. Tesman & Bruno Finzi 1996
- Ferraro Live Plan 'Sax 'Oh' Dream Beat 1996
- Gigliola Cinquetti 'Giovane Vecchio Cuore' Mercury 1995
- Patricia Manterola 'Hambre de Amor' Fonovisa Records Inc. 1995
- Vanni Stefanini 'Sun Shower' Rugginenti Editore 1994
- Historia 'Voglia di cantare' Bebas Record 1994
- Historia 'Il meglio degli Historia - Vol. 2' Bebas Record 1994
- B.o.b. boys 'B.o.b boys' 1994
- 883 (band) Nord sud ovest est FRI 1993
- Alejandra Guzmán 'Libre (Alejandra Guzmán album)' RCA Records International 1993
- Quelli di Vicolo Corto 'Cover' Duck Record 1993
- Ricchi e poveri 'Allegro italiano' EMI Records 1992
- Enrico Musiani 'Cuore cerca cuore' Duck record 1992
- Night flight 'That's it' DDD (BMG Ariola) Ariola Records 1992
- Mediterranée 2 'Background music' HI-LITE productions 1992
- Historia 'Il meglio degli Historia' Duck Record 1992
- Franco Morgia 'I grandi successi di Franco Morgia' Duck Record 1992
- Franky Rogers 'Amore e Rabbia' Duck Gold 1992
- Marina Barone 'Le stagioni del cuore' Duck Record 1992
- Dario Baldan Bembo 'Un pò per vivere, un pò per sognare' Five Record 1991
- White Christmas Orchestra 'Merry Christmas' Duck Records 1991
- Ran 'Nonfirmato' HI-LITE productions 1991
- Christian 'L'amore è una cosa meravigliosa' Duck Record 1991
- TV Movie Soundtrack Il sassofono with Amanda Sandrelli RAI TV Italy 1991
- Tukano 'Carnaval 90' Dub Record 1990
- Tony Ciasky 'Un altro dentro te' America Records 1988
