= Brandenburger Symphoniker =

German symphonic orchestra

The Brandenburger Symphoniker is a German orchestra based in Brandenburg an der Havel. Its home venue is the CulturCongressCentrum there. It is affiliated to the Brandenburger Theater.

== History ==
The orchestra was founded in 1810 by high-ranking Prussian military musicians from the fusiliers and grenadiers regiments. From 1866, the successful music ensemble called itself the Orchestra of the Brandenburg Theatre. After the German reunification the orchestra got the name "Brandenburger Symphoniker".

The orchestra is not only active as a symphony orchestra, but also in opera performances and for several years has been playing in productions for the Kammeroper Schloss Rheinsberg festival. The Brandenburg Symphony Orchestra regularly performs in Berlin (Konzerthaus Berlin, Berliner Philharmonie), Potsdam (Nikolaisaal), Frankfurt (Oder) (concert hall) and other cities in the Land of Brandenburg, but also gives guest performances throughout Germany and abroad. Guest performances have taken the orchestra through Europe, to the US, Japan, South Africa and China. The Brandenburg Symphony Orchestra is a regular guest at the Festival MúsicaMallorca in Palma.

In 2020, Olivier Tardy had been appointed as chief conductor of the orchestra, with an initially intended starting date of the 2021–2022 season. In February 2021, the orchestra announced revised plans for Tardy to work with the orchestra as principal guest conductor in the 2021–2022 season, and to become chief conductor in the 2022–2023 season. Subsequently in 2021, Hardy declined a later contract offer from the Brandenburger Theater, and never took up the post with the Brandenburger Symphoniker or the Brandenburger Theater.

In October 2022, the orchestra announced the appointment of Andreas Spering as its next chief conductor, effective 1 August 2023, with an initial contract of 5 years.

The Jacaranda Ensemble, founded in 1997, is a German instrumental ensemble made up of musicians and soloists from the Brandenburg Symphony Orchestra.

== Conductors ==
- 1945 – 1946 Martin Velins
- 1946 – 1950 Paul Schwob
- 1950 – 1955 Paul Diener
- 1955 – 1956 Willi Bantelmann
- 1957 – 1958 Hermann Josef Nellessen
- 1958 – 1959 Hans-Werner Nicolovius
- 1959 – 1964 Gerhard Wappler
- 1964 – 1967 Jochen Wehner
- 1967 – 1978 Rolf Rohde
- 1978 – 1985 Andreas Wilhelm
- 1985 – 1989 Christian Morgenstern
- 1990 – 1999 Heiko Mathias Förster
- 2000 – 2015 Michael Helmrath
- 2015 – 2020 Peter Gülke
