= 2020 Visions (album) =

- Album Cover by Klaus Voormann

Studio album by Stephen Dale Petit
- Released: 2020
- Recorded: Sputnik Sound, Eve Studios.
- Genre: Blues; new blues; blues rock; rock
- Label: 333 Records Ltd
- Producer: Vance Powell

Stephen Dale Petit chronology
Cracking the Code (2013)	2020 Visions (2020)

2020 Visions is the sixth album by Stephen Dale Petit, released digitally on 12 June 2020 and on vinyl and CD on 25 September 2020.

It was recorded over a 12 month period beginning in March 2017 at Sputnik Sound, Nashville with Vance Powell producing. The album has been described as “prophetic”, its lyrical themes predicting many 2020 world events despite having been finished in “mid-2018”.

2020 Visions was named Best Blues Album of the Year by Classic Rock magazine.

The album features Petit's core band of Jack Greenwood on drums and Sophie Lord on bass, with guest appearances from Paul Jones (Manfred Mann, The Blues Band) and Shemekia Copeland. The album cover and insert were designed by Klaus Voormann.

The album's release was originally scheduled for late 2018, but Petit received a cancer diagnosis in September 2018, causing the album's release to be postponed for more than a year whilst he completed intensive chemotherapy and radiation treatments. The release was further delayed by UK lockdown restrictions for Covid-19 resulting in the lengthy shuttering of all bricks and mortar music retail stores throughout the country.

== Pre-production and band recording sessions ==
Petit began writing the earliest songs for “2020 Visions” during rehearsals for his UK tour with Walter Trout in November 2015. Album tracks “The Ending Of The End” and “On Top” were debuted during the 2015 tour dates.

Speaking of his modus operandi when approaching the album, Petit stated:

“[2020 Visions] is not supposed to be just a traditional Blues record, (though its) born of the Blues [...] once you’re there you can let the songs have their own head not dictated by or based on some guardrail or boundary. I let them be what they wanted to be [...] For Blues to continue into the future, it has to return to what it always was, a live organic music made in response to the musician’s life.”

With the writing continuing around live shows and festival performances throughout 2016, intensive pre-production rehearsals took place in early 2017 after which Petit and his band (comprising Jack Greenwood on drums and Sophie Lord on bass) flew to Nashville on the 26 March 2017. Recording commenced the next day, 27 March 2017, at Sputnik Sound, Nashville with co-owner Vance Powell producing. Powell had also recorded Petit’s previous studio album “Cracking The Code”. The initial full band recordings were completed over the course of 6 days, recorded live with all the musicians in the room together. Petit remarked of the sessions:

“It’s one of the reasons I’m so proud of the album, the ensemble playing. They’re bringing performances to the music, capturing lightning in a bottle; everybody rose to the occasion and played their asses off.” When Petit mentioned that a few songs ‘wanted keyboards’, Powell suggested Daniel Ellsworth, who joined Petit, Lord and Greenwood live in the studio to play Hammond organ and piano on two songs, “The Ending of The End” and “Zombie Train”.

== Additional recording sessions and special guests ==
Following the live band recordings, Petit returned to Nashville throughout 2017 and 2018 to overdub guitar parts, vocals and oversee the mixing sessions. Most of Petit's vocal performances were recorded at Eve Studios, Stockport, England.

The recording session for Shemekia Copeland was carried out remotely. "When we did the session, she was in Chicago, I was in London and we did it by Skype! There are a lot of harmonies there and there’s a lot of Shemekia... it sounds glorious. I was kind of concerned because I wanted to double them or triple them, and I thought she was going to go, 'No man, I’m outta here, I'm done!' But she was fabulous, she had a great attitude."

Speaking of Jones' contribution to the album, Petit commented: "He's just phenomenal; he's got great energy and I think he played some astonishing harp. But the genius of it is that it's all in aid of the song, even though it's proper virtuoso harp playing. I don't use the word genius haphazardly or casually, but if you took what he's playing and put it on a standard blues progression, you'd be blown away. And yet it fits perfectly into the song, so that is just true genius."

Petit had planned to feature additional special guests, including Dr. John on the track "Zombie Train". Petit states: "The original idea was to have Iggy Pop and Dr. John do it, and I had actually been in touch with Dr. John. But he became so ill, and he was not well for a good 18 months to 2 years before he died. So I ended up cutting that vocal." The composition of "Sputnik Days" saw Petit collaborate with guitarist Mick Taylor.

Ringo Starr makes a cameo appearance during the intro section of "The Ending of the End".

== Album themes and running sequence ==
Petit has described the album as “a slightly dystopian vision, or post-apocalyptic dystopian or pre-apocalyptic dystopian. The three main threads are the title track “2020 Visions”, “The Fall of America” and “Zombie Train”. They are the main pillars I suppose, so everything else is built in around that.”

Of the new approach to his writing process on 2020 Visions, Petit states:

“I really was kind of channelling... a Shaman, or John the Revelator, trying to use spider-sense and any other sense... I was just trying to put my finger up to the wind to catch the zeitgeist I suppose. It felt kind of odd; I’ve never really gone for anything like that, so this was all fresh territory in terms of my writing. But it all just started to work and I went with it... ”

Music News writer Andy Snipper commented of the album's synchronicity of current events: “[2020 Visions] mirrors what is happening now and the blistering anger at the state of leadership in the modern world is visceral.”

== Album design and vinyl packaging ==
Both the album cover and the pull-out circular collage insert featured on the vinyl release of the album were designed by Klaus Voormann. They also comprise the artwork for the CD release, though adapted to the format. Petit had to “audition” for Voormann prior to his agreeing to work together. Describing his initial conversations with Voormann, Petit remarked: “He wouldn’t become involved without hearing the music, and he really made me jump through hoops. I was thrilled when he agreed.”

The circular collage insert for 2020 Visions contains a hidden Easter Egg by Voormann, who included the same signature and photograph of himself that he’d hidden in The Beatles Revolver album cover.

The vinyl packaging has been heralded by critics, with Charles Shaar Murray commenting that "the intricate lyrical tapestry and kaleidoscopic soundscape are exquisitely reflected and enhanced by the album’s spectacular artwork”.

Blues Matters Steve Banks compared the album design to that of the iconic design of Led Zeppelin 3 and described the vinyl release as “incredible - [2020 Visions] is worth it for the artwork alone.” Classic Rock praised the artwork and design of the album as “Stunning”.

== Critical reception ==
2020 Visions was named Number One in the Best Blues Albums of the Year category by UK's Classic Rock magazine.

“Petit has been nudging greatness for years, and this is his masterpiece” it stated, adding his “revolutionary approach to the blues is validated with 2020 Visions” with music that “roars from the speakers, thunderous blues music [...] and powerful lyrics” concluding “you don’t make a record like this by sticking to the straight and narrow” - Henry Yates, Classic Rock Magazine.

Former NME writer Charles Shaar Murray commented that “Petit decisively furthers his revolutionary approach to the blues... [2020 Visions] is a high water mark for Petit as a songwriter" and, of Petit’s guitar playing on the album stated that “Petit bestows otherworldly heights of higher six-string powers upon us... [Petit and his band] turn in performances which astonish, disturb, seduce and convince.”

Music-News awarded 2020 Visions 5/5 stars and described the album as “prophetic... Petit’s hardest hitting album to date” as well as praising Petit as “one of the most skilled axe men of his generation”.

Blues Matters gave the album an 8 star review, stating "[2020 Visions] is 3-piece Blues at its best".

The US based Blues Rock Review described 2020 Visions as being "like an epic drive where you're constantly changing the radio station and never finding a bad song. Petit and his band are fluent in many styles and toggle through them, often within a single tune, resulting in complex tracks that still manage to make your heart race and your head bang."

Guitarist Magazine said the album was an "absolute banger" giving the album a 9 out of 10 review citing Petit’s "blues guitar mastery” and the “rock-solid rhythm section comprising bassist Sophie Lord and drummer Jack Greenwood”.

Velvet Thunder Magazine praised 2020 Visions as "an astonishing virtuoso performance" and commented: "[2020 Visions] started playing and, before I knew it, I'd gone from 'let's check out a couple of minutes' to being 20 minutes deep and having my jaw on the floor. If all blues sounded like this I'd say Robert Johnson got a hell of a deal at that crossroads."

== Track listing ==
1. "2020 Visions" (Petit) - 3:33
2. "The Fall of America" (Petit) - 9:11
3. "Roxie's Song" (Petit) - 4:00
4. "Soul of a Man" (Traditional; arranged by Petit) - 2:49
5. "On Top" (Petit, Lord) - 1:25
6. "Long Tall Shorty" (Abrahamson, Covay) - 4:04
7. "Raw" (Petit) - 3:42
8. "Tinderbox" (Petit) - 3:56
9. "The Ending of the End" (Petit) - 7:13
10. "Steppin’ Out" - 2:37
11. "Makin' It" (Petit) - 4:19
12. "Sputnik Days" (Petit) - 3:54
13. "Zombie Train" (Petit, Lord, Yiannadiji) - 9:15

== Personnel ==
- Stephen Dale Petit – guitar, vocals, backing vocals
- Sophie Lord – bass
- Jack Greenwood – drums
- Paul Jones – harmonica on "Soul of a Man"
- Shemekia Copeland – backing vocals on "Soul of a Man"
- Cara Fox – cello on "The Fall of America"
- Daniel Ellsworth – piano, keyboards
- Jason Eskridge – backing vocals on "Zombie Train" and "Makin' It"
- Martin Ditcham – percussion
- Chris Elliot – string arrangement on "The Fall of America"

== Production ==
- Recorded, mixed and engineered by Vance Powell
- Assistant engineer – Mike Fahey
- Additional engineering by Jim Spencer, Dennis Weinreich, Nuno Fernandes, Graham Dominy, Shane Hendrickson, Mike Sportiello
- Mastered by Pete Lyman
- Recorded at Sputnik Sound, Nashville
- Additional recording at Eve Studios
- Vinyl lacquer cut by George Ingram
- Cover and insert artwork – Klaus Voormann
