= Stephen Dale Petit =

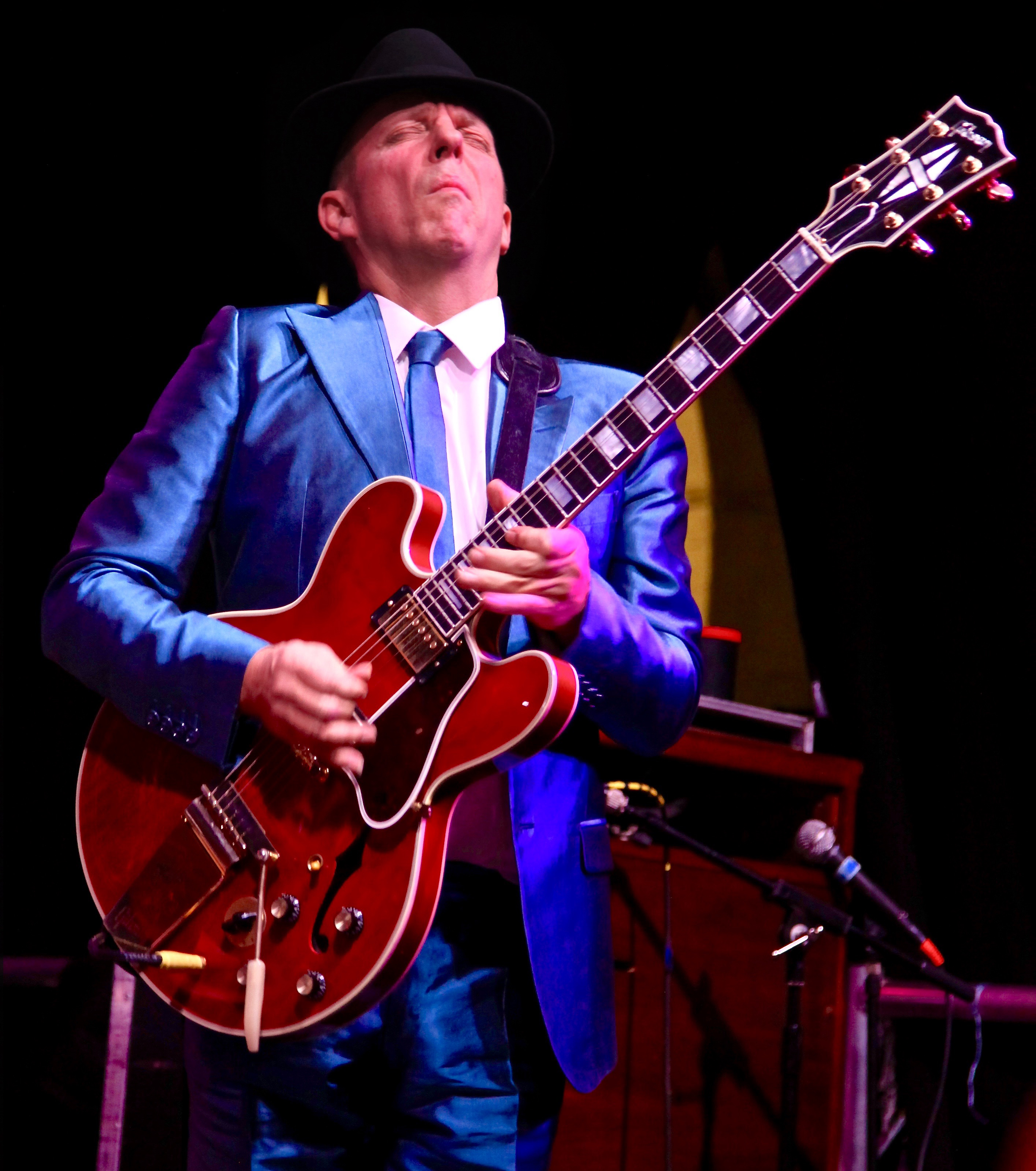

Background information
- Also known as: SDP
- Born: Stephen Dale Petit; 19 April 1969 (age 57)
- Genres: Blues, blues-rock
- Occupations: Musician, singer-songwriter, artist
- Instruments: Guitar, vocals, bass guitar, piano, keyboards
- Label: 333 Records
- Website: Official website

Stephen Dale Petit (born 19 April 1969) is an American-born guitarist, singer, songwriter and new blues musician.

Petit's blues guitar experience started at a young age in California and continued through addiction, alcoholism, homelessness, and subsequent recovery. He went from being a performer in the London Underground to giving masterclass University lectures on blues music whilst becoming a well-known stage act.

Petit has released six albums, toured extensively around the United Kingdom and Europe, gaining critical recognition, sizeable sales and widespread radio airplay. His musical collaborators include Rolling Stones Ronnie Wood and Mick Taylor, Dr. John, Hubert Sumlin, Albert Lee, Chris Barber, The Pretty Things’ Phil May and Dick Taylor, The Black Keys’ Patrick Carney, Max Middleton, Paul Jones and Shemekia Copeland.

Petit's playing style, described by Classic Rock Magazine as containing "The fire of Freddie King, the instinct of Jimmy Page and the soul of Eric Clapton" moved former Rolling Stone Mick Taylor to comment: "He’s got his own unique take on contemporary blues… I’ve heard him do a great live version of Freddie King’s "Have You Ever Loved a Woman?" It was wonderful. All his albums are very interesting, he deserves the recognition."

== Beginnings ==
Stephen Dale Petit was born in the California desert, near Joshua Tree National Park and grew up in Huntington Beach, California which was then a small surf town south of Los Angeles. At the age of seven he received his first guitar, an acoustic. Petit could often be seen at the Huntington Beach landmark venue, The Golden Bear, which hosted such acts as Jimi Hendrix and Bob Dylan, as well as Blues legends Albert King, B.B. King and John Mayall. Petit's exposure, from a young age, to some of these artists and guitar talents would have a major impact on his personal creative development and future musical career.

=== Meeting with Albert King and early California performances ===
Petit began his musical career at a young age. By his mid-teens he was performing in bars and clubs across California, including The Golden Bear, five nights a week with bands ten years his senior, alongside such musicians as Randy Rhoads. During this time, Petit met and was influenced by musician Albert King. He also met and briefly jammed with blues musician B.B. King.

Major early influences on Petit's musical style included early Twentieth Century Blues pioneers B.B. King, Freddie King, Albert King, blues front man Elmore James, Robert Johnson, Charley Patton, Tampa Red, Lead Belly and Son House. Petit also cites British blues pioneers Alexis Korner and Cyril Davies as having influenced his teenage musical sensibilities.

=== Early career in the UK ===
In the mid-1980s, inspired by the British blues boom of the 1960s and 1970s, Petit moved from California to London. Petit believes that British blues had as much impact on the genre as that of its African American pioneers: "The British contribution to the blues is equal, in my eyes, to what Robert Johnson did, Blind Lemon Jefferson ... all of those guys all the way through to Muddy Waters. I think it is a certainty that without the British blues boom the music (blues) would not have anything remotely like the profile it does."

During his initial years in the UK, Petit toured London's Leicester Square and Little Venice over a 9-month period in Phil May of The Pretty Things "Friends Band" alongside May, himself, David Gilmour of Pink Floyd and Ian Stewart of The Rolling Stones. During this time Petit became acquainted with, and performed with, Eric Clapton. Petit believes Clapton's influence on guitar and blues is immense, saying that Clapton builds "solos like a well written speech".

=== Busking on the London Underground ===
In late 2003, Petit began busking intensively on the London Underground as part of the Transport for London Licensed Busking Scheme, with Clapton describing this as "really admirable". Speaking to Blues Matters magazine on his time spent busking Petit commented: "Knowing that Robert Johnson, B.B. King, Howlin' Wolf, Lonnie Johnson, Blind Lemon Jefferson etc all did it, made what is essentially doing it the hard way feel like it was the only right way to start" "I know from playing below The Astoria that even death metal heads, goths, punks ... and skateboard kids like the Blues. Sometimes the metal kids upstairs would come down and say 'you're better than the band we just paid £15 to see,' that sort of stuff makes an impression on you." he further stated. Petit soon attracted media attention from BBC radio and press and television.

== More recently ==
Funded by his busking on the London Underground, Petit released his debut album Guitararama in 2006 to critical acclaim. The album was heralded as Guitar & Bass Magazine's "Album Of The Year" while front-runner music publication Classic Rock Magazine described Petit in its 8/10 star review as "occupying a stunning middle ground between the fire of Freddie King, the instinct of Jimmy Page and the soul of Eric Clapton." The album was re-released in 2008 due to demand.

In 2008, Petit embarked on his BLUnivErSity tour, travelling across the UK to colleges and universities to raise awareness of the genre, and to make the blues more accessible to young people. Petit gave extensive lectures on the blues, its history and its legacy as well as performing himself.

In 2009, Petit toured with former Bluesbreakers and Rollings Stones guitarist Mick Taylor throughout the UK. In 2010 he released his second studio album The Crave which featured guest appearances from Mick Taylor, Dick Taylor and Max Middleton. His second album The Crave received critical acclaim and sold well, with Classic Rock Magazine placing The Crave alongside Eric Clapton and Ronnie Wood in its "Top 50 Albums Of The Year". In its review, BRFM.com likened the album's mastery of styles to The Clash’s iconic London Calling album.

On 1 December 2010, Petit organised Save The 100 Club Benefit Concert to raise funds for the historic venue to prevent its imminent closure. Petit was joined onstage by former Rolling Stone Mick Taylor, Pretty Things guitarist and former Rolling Stones bassist Dick Taylor, Rolling Stone guitarist Ronnie Wood and British Blues forefather jazz trombonist Chris Barber for the concert. The 100 Club benefit served as the first time three generations of the Rolling Stones’ historic line up had performed onstage together. Proceeds from his single "Need Your Love So Bad" went towards the effort to save the venue from closure. In its review of the show, leading live review site allgigs.com praised Petit's performance: "Petit’s solos, variously expansive, chunky or crying, are a living, of-this-electrifying-moment history of the guitar, from old school Delta beginnings to listen-to-this, in-your-face nu-school and beyond". Petit has played at The 100 Club on Oxford Street more than twenty times, and considers it to be his spiritual home.

In August 2011, he began recording his next studio album, Cracking The Code, at Blackbird Studio in Nashville, Tennessee with Grammy Award-winning producer Vance Powell. The sessions for the album continued over an 18-month period and included guest appearances from legendary Howlin’ Wolf guitarist Hubert Sumlin, Dr. John, British blues forefather Chris Barber, Mick Taylor and Patrick Carney of The Black Keys.

A compilation album of Petit's live appearances on BBC Radio 2, The BBC Sessions, was released on 5 December 2011.

In June 2012, a vinyl only live album Stephen Dale Petit At High Voltage was released in a limited edition pressing. The album was described as "just about the greatest live record you’ll ever hear" by Classic Rocks The Blues magazine.

On 15 September 2013, Petit released his third studio album Cracking The Code. The Express praised the album: "Petit’s electrifying guitar and gutsy vocals are the drive behind this musical tour de force… he’s a master craftsman at the top of his game." "Thrusting blues hooligan anthems" was the verdict of premier UK music magazine MOJO.

On 15 March 2015, a digital re-release of live album Stephen Dale Petit At High Voltage was released. It was one of the first albums to be released on Neil Young's PONO format. In October 2015, it was announced that Petit would join Walter Trout as special guest on his "I’m Back" UK Tour.

In 2016, Petit toured across the UK and headlined the Rother Bluestage Festival in Roth, Germany. In March 2017, Petit flew to the US to record at Vance Powell's Sputnik Sounds in Berry Hill, Nashville Tennessee, with Sophie Lord (bass) and Jack Greenwood (drums). The songs from these sessions would later be released as the double album, 2020 Visions. The artwork for the album cover was created by Klaus Voormann.

Although slated for a late 2018 release, Petit received a Stage 4 cancer diagnosis in mid 2018, for which he underwent intensive chemotherapy and radiotherapy treatments. Petit insisted on performing throughout the treatment, though he was subsequently unable to continue work for months. In September 2019, he performed across Spain on a 15 date tour.

In February 2020, Petit and his band headlined Villa Do Condo Blues Festival in Portugal. The album's rescheduled release date of 27 March 2020, with UK album launch tour of 10 dates, was cancelled due to COVID lockdown laws. Eventually 2020 Visions was released digitally on 1 June 2020 and physically on 25 September that year. Petit has resumed live performances, including a return to Spain for 17 shows in November 2021, a headline appearance at The Upton Blues Festival in England, Leeds Blues Festival and The 100 Club in London.

Petit began recording his next album at RAK Studios in London in early September 2022 with Vance Powell producing; further sessions have taken place at Brighton Electric, England and in Portugal with Boz Boorer.

Petit has been featured extensively on national, regional and student radio, including live in-studio sessions and interviews and specially commissioned BBC Radio 2 music sessions.

== Influences and ideology: The New Blues Revolution ==
Petit has explained, "The reason I am on the planet is to play blues guitar. I’m on a mission to spread the word about the blues and about the guitar – especially to young music lovers." Petit is widely considered a spokesperson for the "New Blues Revolution". Explaining his ideology, Petit states that he felt that blues had faded to the background of British music consciousness, and so he promoted the New Blues Revolution, seeking to restore the blues to the popularity it experienced during the British Blues Boom of the mid-1960s: "I want to restore the Blues to the Top 40 in this country, where it belongs… All modern music is in debt to the Blues… there is no reason why it can’t be restored to the popularity it once had."

Speaking further to Classic Rock Magazine, Petit elaborated: "I embrace the concept that the blues has to change. Heavy metal, progressive rock, death metal, shred, emo… it all has its roots in the blues….there’s a lot of stereotypical blues production and strategies and ways of recording that are really cheesy. Some people seem to adhere to those strictures, and I think it sounds really stale. What I’m saying is: how about if instead of going right we go hard left and go up two floors? I’m more interested in finding this new way forward."

As part of Petit's New Blues ethos he gives masterclass lectures and performances at Universities across the UK. In 2008 he set out on a "BlUnivErSity" tour, incorporating historical perspective lectures, musical performance and multimedia presentations. "With these masterclasses I get to share my life's passion in a more interactive setting, explore this fascinating phenomenon that underpins all modern guitar music and therefore most popular music of the last 100 years." Petit embarked on a fresh University masterclass tour called "Blues2Uni" in 2016.

== Discography ==
=== Albums ===
- Guitararama (2008)
- The Crave (2010)
- The BBC Sessions (2011)
- Stephen Dale Petit At High Voltage (2012)
- Cracking The Code (2013)
- 2020 Visions (2020)
