= Steven Bryan =

Italian/English singer-songwriter

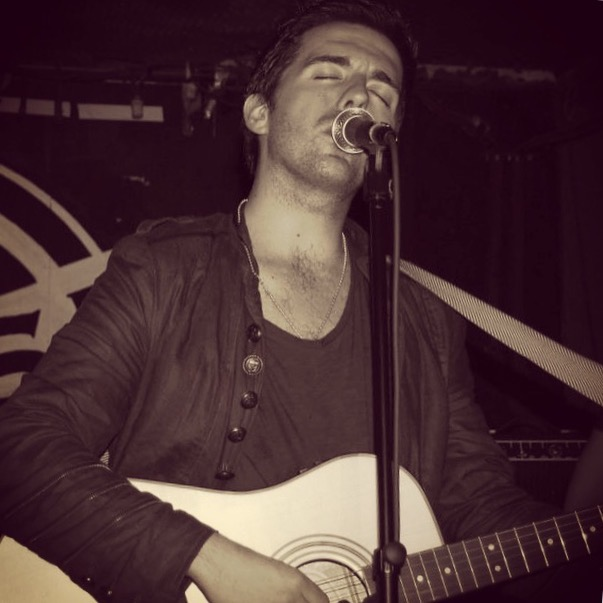
- Steven Bryan performing live in NYC (2010)

Background information
- Birth name: Francesco Dell'Orco
- Born: 4 April 1982 (age 43); Milan, Italy
- Genres: Pop, Folk, rock, singer-songwriter, adult contemporary
- Occupation: Singer-songwriter
- Instrument(s): Vocals, acoustic guitar
- Years active: 2003–present
- Labels: Puppets Music Ltd
- Website: stevenbryanmusic.com

Steven Bryan (born Francesco Dell'Orco; 4 April 1982) is an Italian/English singer-songwriter. He has released two studio albums to date: One Way (2010) and Gravity Always Wins (2017).

== Early career ==
Born in Milan, Italy as Francesco Dell'Orco, Bryan grew up listening to a range of folk, rock and roll, soul, and his father's classical music collection. Moving around the world as a child, he took influence from American and British songwriters such as Bob Dylan, Simon & Garfunkel, The Beatles and Cat Stevens.

Steven started playing regular gigs in his hometown with various cover bands around 1999, however he soon realised that the only way to get a career in the music business was to play original songs.

But to do that, he needed a change. "I felt like Milan had nothing left to offer, I was feeling a little cramped and unmotivated, so I decided to move to London".

== One Way (2010–16) ==
Steven Bryan landed in London in 2007 and played the acoustic circuit intensively for a couple of years while writing over 25 songs for his debut album, "One Way". The album caught the attention of a few record labels, and Bryan signed a worldwide deal with Right Track Records/Universal Music Operations in 2011 for his first single Puppets On TV.

Puppets On TV has been featured on BBC Radio 2, BBC London 94.9 and Cool FM in the UK and IHeartRadio in the US.

Bryan and his band played a series of sold-out UK shows in 2012, but after difficulties with the record label and his manager they eventually decided to part ways in 2013. "It wasn't as peaceful as I would have liked, and it left a deep scar to be honest. At one point I almost thought I was done with music, and frankly didn't mind. I even went all the way to Australia, I just wanted to be far away from that world! But then something happened.. as soon as I said "Screw this!" I found myself writing songs like never before, probably out of anger and frustration. I went back to London in 2015 and started working on my new album almost immediately".

== Gravity Always Wins (2017–19) ==
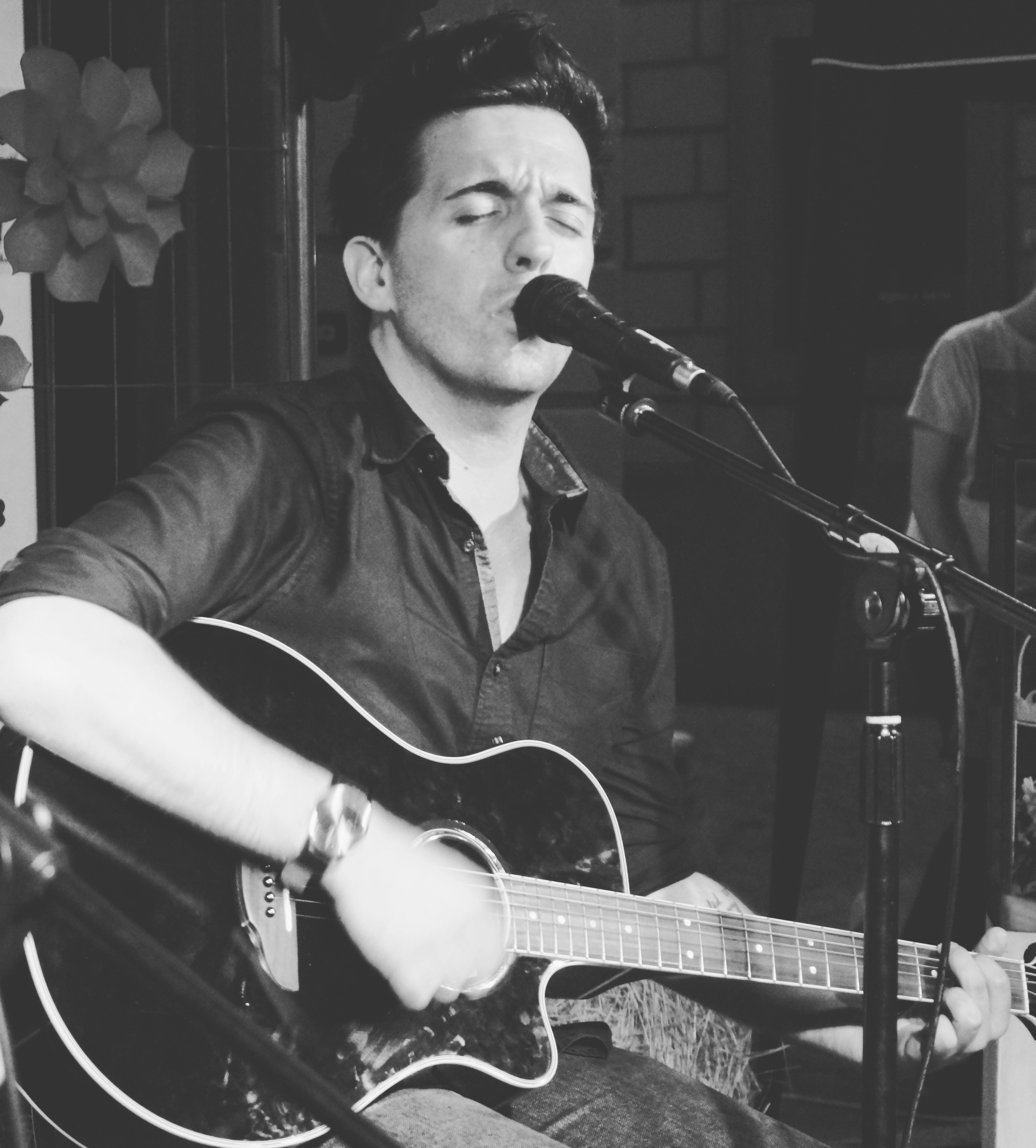
Steven Bryan performing in London, 2017

Gravity Always Wins revitalised Bryan's passion for songwriting, by deciding to go away from the full band formula present on One Way and instead shine the spotlight of just his voice and acoustic guitar.

Produced by Francesco Lo Castro, the album was released on 27 June 2017 and consists of 11 tracks, including a new version of Lights, already on the previous album One Way.

The first two singles off Gravity Always Wins are Sing To Me, released on 3 June 2016, and Dolled Up, released on 16 February 2018.

== Discography ==
- One Way (Album – 2010)
- Puppets On TV (Single – 2011)
- One Way Deluxe Edition (Album – 2013)
- Sing To Me (Single – 2016)
- Gravity Always Wins (Album – 2017)
- Dolled Up (Single – 2018)
