= Guitararama =

Studio album by Stephen Dale Petit
- Released: 2 June 2008
- Recorded: 2007–2008
- Genre: Blues, new blues, blues rock
- Length: 63:27
- Language: English
- Label: 333 Records
- Producer: Stephen Dale Petit/ Richard Niles

Stephen Dale Petit chronology
Guitararama (2008)	The Crave (2010)

Guitararama is the first studio album by Stephen Dale Petit released on 2 June 2008. The album was both inspired and funded by Petit's time spent performing as part of the Licensed Busking scheme on the London Underground in 2003.

Speaking to EarlyBlues.com, Petit commented: "It was hard but ultimately it led to me recording Guitararama. People stopped me down there and said "Can I buy this?" but I had nothing to sell so after a few months I thought I'd better set about recording some music."

Guitararama was recorded over an 18-month period and financed entirely by busking. It was released independently by Petit in late 2006. The album's first pressing was initially available only on the London Underground before being taken on by major UK commercial retailers and online outlets.

Guitararama was re-packaged and re-released on 2 June 2008 under 333 Records, with 3 extra bonus tracks added ("Blues From Mars", "Bad Road Blues" and "A Better Answer"). The album is in a Digipak format with a 16-page colour booklet featuring photography from street photographer John Gladdy.

== Concept and influences ==
Guitararama is predominantly instrumental and appeals to "both the mature, arts-appreciative audience and the younger, guitar-inquisitive end of the market."

Petit states that in creating the album, his "guiding principle was to honour the music that had floored me throughout my life, to do it justice, to try and create the magic, mystery and excitement I’d heard in that music in my own songs and to capture it in the recordings".

== Reception ==
Classic Rock reviewed the album, giving it eight stars and stating: "Petit occupies a stunning middle ground between the fire of Freddie King, the instinct of Jimmy Page and the soul of Clapton… It's difficult these days to put a new spin on such an old genre as the blues but Petit has managed it".

Guitar & Bass Magazine placed Guitararama in its "Top 10 Albums of the Year", writing that "Petit’s vim and vigour are matched by his fine technical skills... proof positive that the blues can move forward in the 21st century."

Properganda Magazine praised the album for Petit's "incendiary playing" and described Petit as a "a phenomenal technician who demonstrates tremendous feel." Commenting on Petit's performance on Guitararama, Rock N Reel Magazine said: "Petit's got that elusive must see quality that makes a minor deities of accomplished musicians".

The first incarnation of Guitararama entered the Top 10 HMV Blues Album Chart in the UK (between two Robert Johnson albums), as well as the iTunes Top 10 Chart in both Norway and Sweden.

== Singles ==
Preceding the album is the three track single with "7 Cent Cotton", "Told You So", and "Alexis Korner Says" with "7 Cent Cotton" video.

== Track listing ==
All songs were written by Stephen Dale Petit, except where noted.

1. "Sacramento" – 4:55
2. "Intro" – 0:14
3. "Alexis Korner Says" – 5:31
4. "Intro" – 0:19
5. "Crack Whore" (SDP, Niles) – 4:49
6. "Aint No Sunshine" – 3:23
7. "Surf City W10" (SDP, Niles – 3:36
8. "10 Year Reflections" – 8:54
9. "Percy's Thumb" – 4:57
10. "69 Duke Street" – 1:43
11. "Told You So" – 5:40
12. "7 Cent Cotton" – 3:38
13. "Pure" – 2:56
14. "10 Year Blues" – 4:58
15. "Blues From Mars" – 3:02
16. "Bad Road Blues" (SDP, Federico Ariano, Franz Piombino) – 6:04
17. "A Better Answer" (SDP, Baxter, Cripps) – 2:48

== Personnel ==
- Stephen Dale Petit – guitar, vocals, bass, keyboards
- Phil Spalding and Franz Piombino – bass
- Gary Wallis, Chuck Sabo, Federico Ariano, Ron Petit and Rick Walsh – drums
- Laurent Mouflier – harp
- Paul Spong and Roberto Manzin – horns
- Anouska Di Giorgio – backing vocals
