= Space UK =

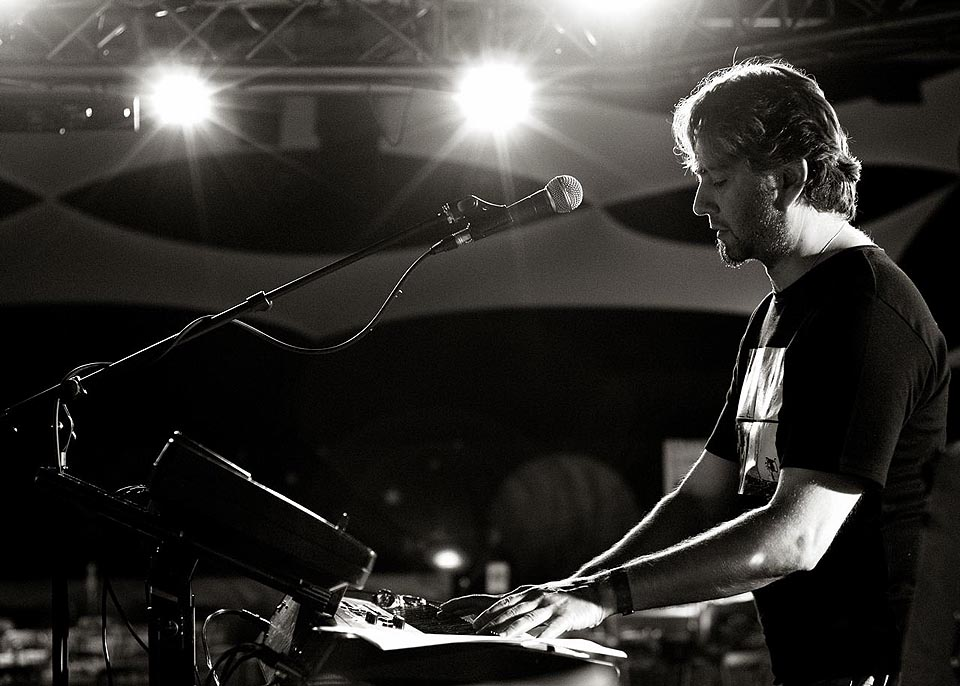
- Space UK live

Background information
- Origin: United Kingdom
- Genres: Pop, electronic, rock, R&B, soul
- Occupation: Session musicians
- Years active: 1990-present
- Website: Spaceuk.biz

Space UK is a British musical group of session musicians led by the singer-songwriter Anita Kelsey, based in London.

Anita Kelsey won a MOBO award in 1997 with Sunship. Kelsey is also the voice behind hundreds of TV adverts and also the voice Jennifer Connelly mimes to in the sci-fi cult classic film Dark City. Other major films featuring Kelsey's voice include Bring Me the Head of Mavis Davis and Merlin.

== Biography ==
Space UK's musical director is Gordon Hulbert whose credits include Chaka Khan, The Temptations, Alexander O'Neal, Heatwave, and Imagination. Hulbert was a member of Domino act Psapp (BMI winners for "Cosy in the Rocket' - theme to ABC's hit series Grey's Anatomy) during their 2006-2007 European and US tour. As a producer/writer published by EMI, his multimedia credits include Willy Russell's Dancin Thru the Dark, the BBC's Moving the Mountain documentary and Channel 4's First Sunday.

Other core members of Space UK have performed or recorded with some in the music industry today including Beyoncé, Kings of Leon, George Michael, Tina Turner and Amy Winehouse; as well as most of the Motown musicians such as Ben E. King, Martha Reeves & the Vandellas, The Four Tops, Edwin Starr, The Temptations, Frankie Valli & the Four Seasons, and The Three Degrees.

== Band ==
- Vocals: Anita Kelsey and Simon Green
- Keyboards and MD: Alexis Countouris
- Bass guitar: Gordon Hulbert
- Drums: Dave Land
- Guitar: Paul Jones
- Trumpet: Dave Ital
- Saxophonist: Roberto Manzin
  - Dave Land features on the soundtrack of the film Hope and Glory. Land also features on the original, as well as the recent 2010 re-recording, of Katrina and the Waves' "Walking on Sunshine"
  - Anita Kelsey appears in the opening scenes of the horror film Long Time Dead, in which she participates in a ouija board séance just before dying a horrific death.
