= Stephen Dale Petit at High Voltage =

Stephen Dale Petit At High Voltage

Live album by Stephen Dale Petit
- Released: 2012
- Recorded: LMS
- Genre: Blues; new blues; blues rock; rock
- Label: 333 Records Ltd
- Producer: Mark St. John and Paul Madden

Stephen Dale Petit chronology
| The BBC Sessions (2011) | Stephen Dale Petit At High Voltage (2012) | Cracking the Code (2013) |

Stephen Dale Petit At High Voltage is a live album by Stephen Dale Petit released on 15 March 2015. The performance was recorded at London's High Voltage Festival in 2010 by the Ronnie Lane Mobile Recording Unit.

Originally released on Vinyl in 2012, the limited run of 1,000 copies quickly sold out, prompting a digital re-release in 2015 to cater for high demand for the album. The album was one of the first in the UK to be released on Neil Young's hi-fidelity digital format, PONO.

== Original performance ==
The original performance took place in Victoria Park, London, on Sunday 25 July 2010 as part of High Voltage Festival. Other acts on the bill included ZZ Top and Joe Bonamassa. Petit and his band played the Ace Cafe Stage.

Petit's band consisted of Dick Taylor of The Pretty Things on bass, Jack Greenwood, also of The Pretty Things, on drums and Laurent Mouflier on harmonica. It was Taylor's first performance on bass guitar since leaving The Rolling Stones in 1962 and his bass playing on At High Voltage was described as "incredible".

The 45 minute set (there are several tracks still unreleased from the concert) was recorded in analogue by The Ronnie Lane Mobile Studio (LMS), formerly owned by Ronnie Lane of The Faces and previously used to record the likes of Eric Clapton, Led Zeppelin and The Who.

Blues Matters described Petit's performance at the festival as "one of two blues acts standing out like spicy scents against the pervading smell of mothballs" of the rest of the festival bill and suggested that the impact of Petit's set rivalled that of main stage blues act Joe Bonamassa.

The performance itself has become part of British Blues folklore due to a failed attempt to shut the show down by Tower Hamlets Council Environmental Health officers for being too loud.

== Critical reception ==
The original 2012 vinyl-only 1,000 copy release sold out quickly, but demand for At High Voltage continued. As a result, the album's re-release in 2015 on digital format was welcomed by press outlets. The Blues magazine described its release as "overdue" and "a major event in the blues scene".

Classic Rock's The Blues magazine deemed it "the greatest live record you’ll ever hear", awarding the album a 10/10 star rating and drew comparisons to landmark live album Live at Leeds by The Who. "[Summertime Blues and Shakin’ All Over] were famously blasted through by The Who over the years... even they didn't quite reach the intensity of Petit and friends." Editor Ed Mitchell described the album as "Live at Leeds, Dr. Feelgood and 66 Bluesbreakers in one shot."

Guitar & Bass magazine labelled the performance "a classic" and "a true tour de force", while Classic Rock magazine praised the album for capturing a "show-stopping set" and "delivering a glorious and lethally primed brand of sonic devastation", awarding it an 8/10 rating, saying the album had attained "semi-legendary status in contemporary blues-lore."

Former Rolling Stones guitarist Mick Taylor said that At High Voltage was "the best live album since Get Yer Ya-Ya’s Out!"

== Track listing ==
1. "3 Gunslingers" (Petit)
2. "It's All Good" (Petit)
3. "Summertime Blues" (Eddie Cochran, Jerry Capehart)
4. "Sidetracked" (King)
5. "Juke" (Jacobs)
6. "Shakin' All Over" (Johnny Kidd, Guy Robertson)

== Personnel and credits ==
- Stephen Dale Petit – vocals, guitar
- Dick Taylor – bass
- Laurent Mouflier – harmonicas
- Jack Greenwood – drums

Technical

- Recorded by Paul Madden on the Ronnie Lane Mobile Unit at High Voltage Festival, London 2010
- Assisted by Bobby Whelam
- Mixed by Dennis Weinreich at The Smokehouse
- Assisted by Jonathon McMillan
- Mastered for LMS by Gwyn Mathias
- Executive Producers: Mark St John and Paul Madden
