= Save The 100 Club Benefit Concert =

Coordinates: 51°30′58″N 0°8′7.3″W

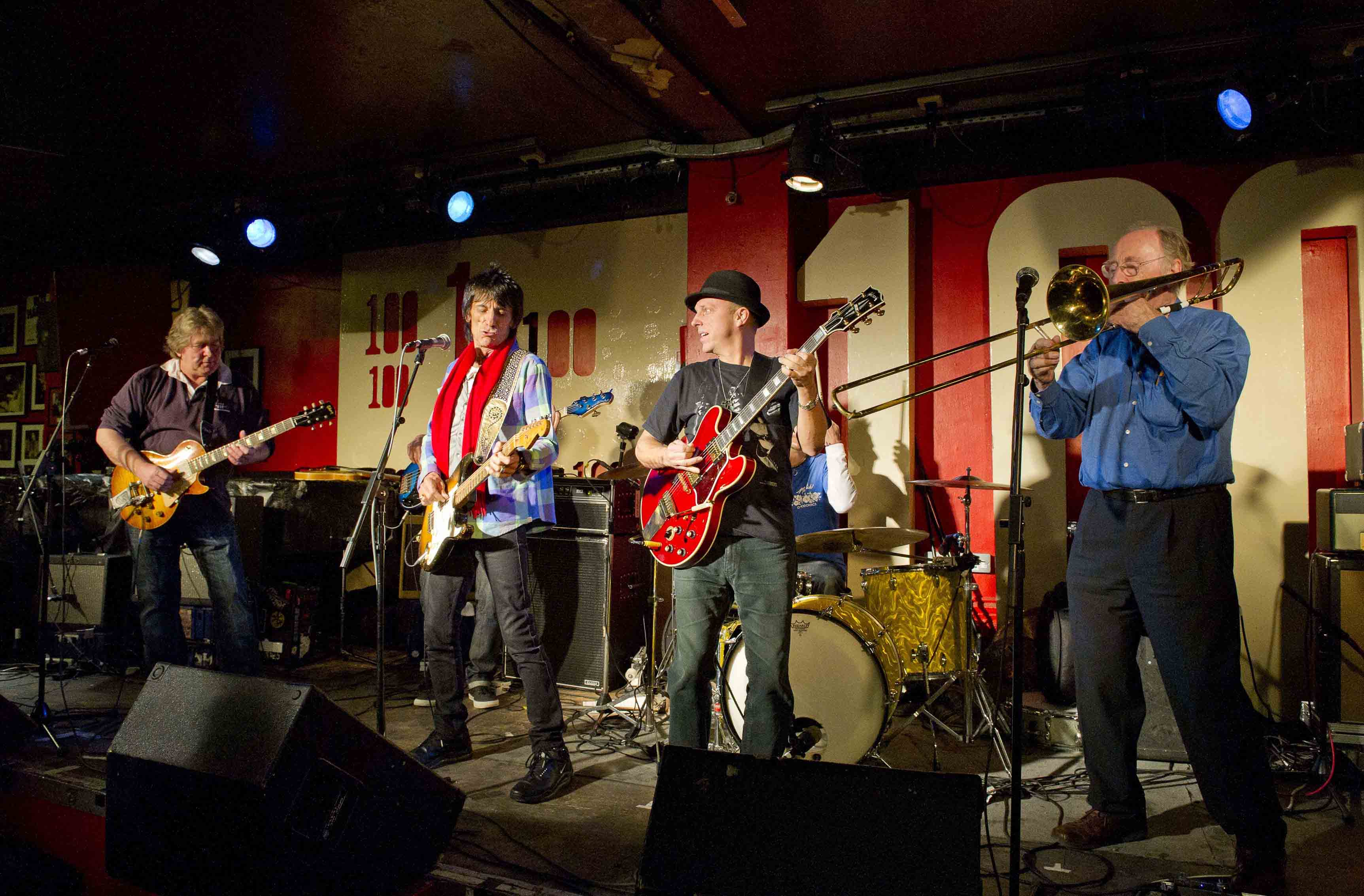
Mick Taylor, Ronnie Wood, Stephen Dale Petit and Chris Barber at the concert

On December 1, 2010, at London's 100 Club, a benefit concert was performed to help the historic live venue to remain at its home at 100 Oxford Street. Guitarist Stephen Dale Petit, who organised the show, performed at the concert alongside his special guests Rolling Stones Ronnie Wood, Mick Taylor and original Stones bassist Dick Taylor, as well as British Blues figure Chris Barber. Tickets sold out immediately and the concert was described by The Express as “one of the most memorable gigs to be performed at a venue where memorable gigs are the norm” and by The Times as “worthy of a place in the 100 Club folklore”

== Background ==
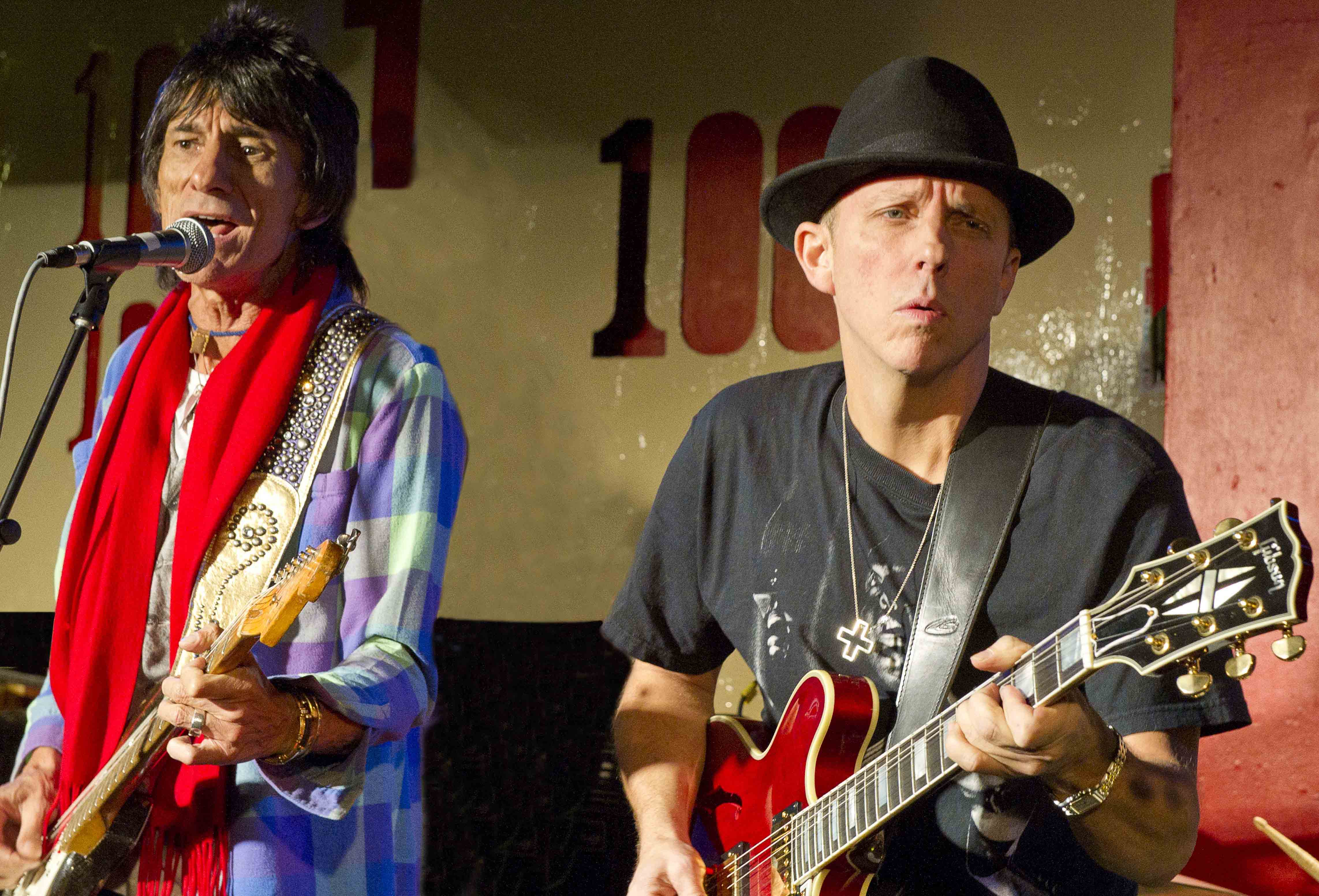
Ronnie Wood and Stephen Dale Petit performing at the concert

On September 22, 2010 The Evening Standard, London's daily newspaper, ran a story detailing the potential closure of the club. The piece included an interview with club owner Jeff Horton, who went public for the first time with the club's struggle to continue to stay open and the massive business pressures that the music venue was experiencing, given that Oxford Street had become one of London's premier retail streets. Horton stated that without help, the club would have to close by Christmas 2010. Upon reading the article, Petit discussed holding a fund raising night with owner Horton, who gave the idea his blessing.

== Souvenir programme ==
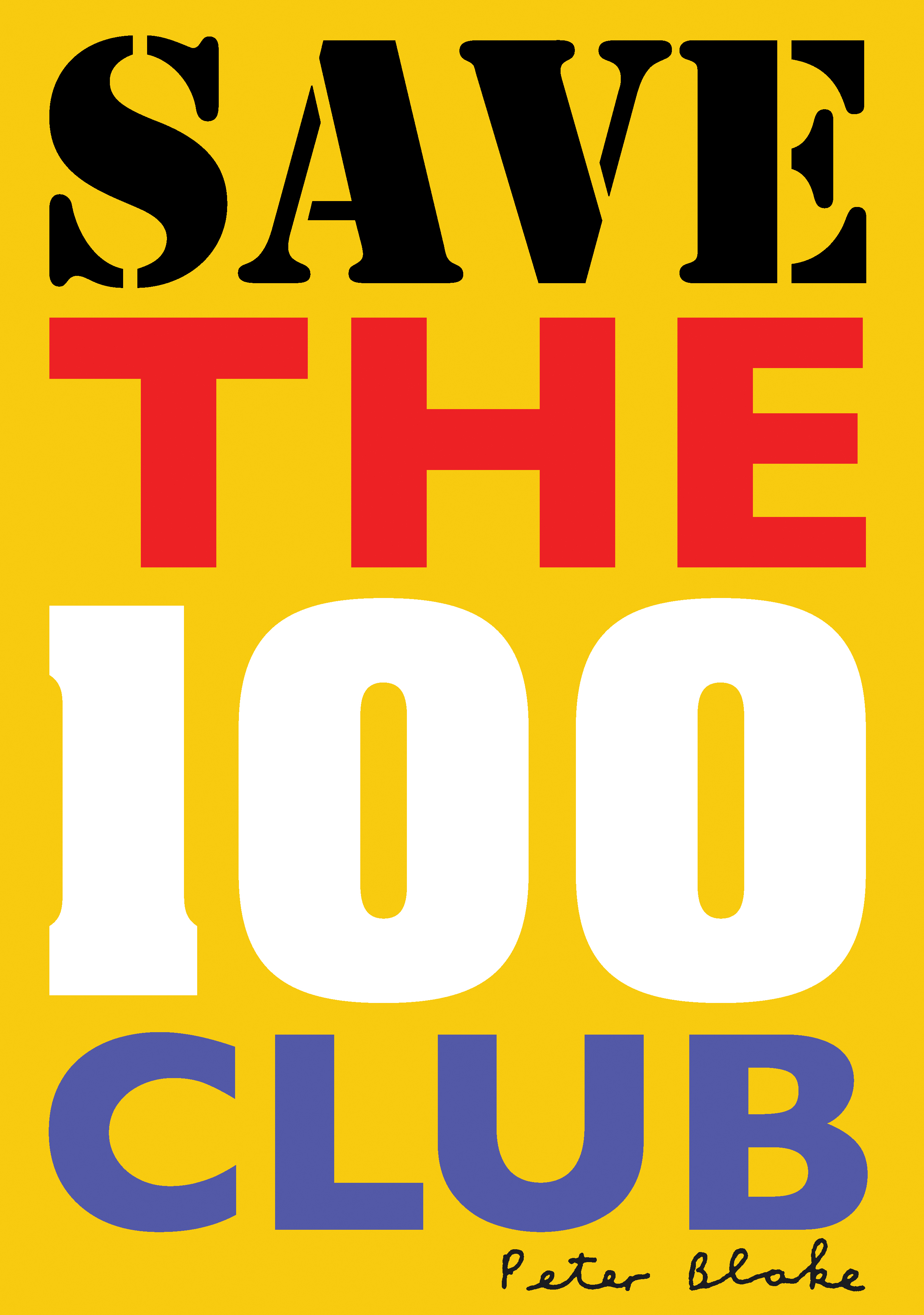
Save The 100 Club Benefit Concert Programme

Artist Sir Peter Blake designed the cover and pull-out poster for a 16 page high-gloss souvenir programme which was sold on the night to raise further monies for the club. The first cover Blake had designed for a club since Sgt. Pepper's was described as "bold and striking". The programme also includes previously unavailable photographs of some of the performances that have taken place at the 100 Club, which were derived from the club's private collection that hangs on the walls of the club. A message from The Rolling Stones was included on the overside of the pull-out poster alongside images of their performance at the club for a memorial concert in honour of their pianist and road manager Ian Stewart. Eric Clapton, Pete Townshend and Jeff Beck joined in and appear in the photographs, the use of which Mick Jagger and Keith Richards personally approved. The programme has become a much sought-after collector's item.

== Effect ==
The money raised from the concert and souvenir programme enabled the club to survive into the New Year, giving owner Horton the time to negotiate a sponsorship deal with trainer manufacturer Converse. This was later superseded by the club's partnership with British fashion brand Fred Perry.
