= Andreas Wilhelm =

German conductor and pianist

Andreas Wilhelm (born 3 February 1947) is a German composer and pianist.

== Life and career ==
Born in Hainsberg, Wilhelm received his first musical education at home. His mother was a concert singer and his father gave him his first piano lessons. He was educated in the Kapellmeister class of Rudolf Neuhaus at the Hochschule für Musik Carl Maria von Weber Dresden from 1965 to 1970. With the topic of his diploma thesis "The early ballets of Igor Stravinsky (The Firebird, Petrushka, Le Sacre du Printemps) he obtained his state examination with distinction. Just one year later, in 1971, he had his first opera conducting engagement at the Semperoper in The School of Women by Rolf Liebermann. This was followed by Bastien und Bastienne, Der Schauspieldirektor, Die lustigen Weiber von Windsor, Die verkaufte Braut, Hänsel und Gretel, Madama Butterfly, Swan Lake and Die Kluge (see opera and concert repertoire).

In 1971, Wilhelm also began teaching accompaniment at the Hochschule für Musik Carl Maria von Weber Dresden, a post he held with few interruptions until 1995. From 1970 to 1972 he also gained professional experience as a pianist and harpsichordist in Kurt Masur's orchestra with the Dresden Philharmonic. From 1974, he was I. Kapellmeister and from 1978 music director at the Brandenburg Theatre.

In 1984, Hans-Joachim Hoffmann, Ministry of Culture (GDR), appointed Andreas Wilhelm as Music Director. In 1986, he became chief conductor of the Philharmonic Orchestra and musical director of the Kleist Theater.

His first guest conductorships, Tales of Hoffmann and Die Kluge, took him to the Staatsoper Unter den Linden in 1990. In the early 1990s, he conducted concerts with the Stuttgart Chamber Orchestra, the Frankfurt Philharmonic Orchestra, the Karlsruhe Chamber Orchestra and others. In addition to his conducting activities, Wilhelm performs as a pianist in chamber music (piano trio, chamber music recitals with various instrumentations, song recitals). Wilhelm's special commitment in the years from 2008 to 2016 was the recording of all works for harpsichord by Johann Sebastian Bach for a CD edition.

== Awards ==
- 1971: Winner of the Weber Prize at the competition for orchestra conductors in Dresden.
- 1973/74: Awarded the Mendelssohn Scholarship of the Ministry of Culture (GDR)
- 1988: Awarded the Carl Philipp Emanuel Bach Medal on the 200th anniversary of the death of C. PH. E. Bach on 14 December 1988 by the Council of the City of Frankfurt (Oder)
- 1989: Scholarship of the International Brahms Society Baden-Baden

== Opera and concert repertoire ==
- Opera repertoire:

Wolfgang Amadeus Mozart: Bastien und Bastienne, Der Schauspieldirektor, Die Hochzeit des Figaro, Cosi fan tutte, Die Zauberflöte. Carl Maria von Weber: Der Freischütz. Albert Lortzing: Der Wildschütz, Zar und Zimmermann, Der Waffenschmied. Gaetano Donizetti: Don Pasquale. Pyotr Ilyich Tchaikovsky: Eugen Onegin, Schwanensee. Giuseppe Verdi: La Traviata, Der Troubadour, Rigoletto, Don Carlos. Giacomo Puccini: La Boheme, Madame Butterfly, Der Mantel. Ferruccio Busoni: Arlecchino oder Die Fenster. Otto Nicolai: Die lustigen Weiber von Windsor. Bedřich Smetana: Die verkaufte Braut. Antonín Dvořák: Rusalka. Engelbert Humperdinck: Hänsel und Gretel. Carl Orff: Die Kluge. Rolf Liebermann: Die Schule der Frauen. Kurt Schwaen: Das Spiel vom Dr. Faust (premiere). Georges Bizet: Carmen. Eugen d’Albert: Tiefland. Christoph Willibald Gluck: Orpheus und Eurydike. Jacques Offenbach: The Tales of Hoffann.

- Concert repertoire:

Joseph Haydn: Sinfonie Nr. 82, 88, 92, 93-104. Wolfgang Amadeus Mozart: Haffner, Linzer, Es-Dur KV 543. g-Moll KV 550, Jupiter. Ludwig van Beethoven: Sinfonie Nr. 1-9. Franz Schubert: Sinfonie Nr. 2-8. Robert Schumann: Sinfonie Nr. 1-4. Johannes Brahms: Sinfonie Nr. 1-4. Felix Mendelssohn Bartholdy: Sinfonie Nr. 3, Schottische, Sinfonie Nr. 4. Italienische. Antonín Dvořák: Sinfonie Nr. 5-8, Sinfonie Nr. 9 Aus der Neuen Welt. Pjotr Tschaikowski: Sinfonie Nr. 3-6. Max Reger: Mozart-Variationen. Anton Bruckner: Sinfonie Nr. 1–4, 6. Gustav Mahler: Sinfonie Nr. 1,4. Jean Sibelius: Sinfonie Nr. 1-4, 7. Sergei Prokofiev: Sinfonie Nr. 1, 5, 7. Dmitri Shostakovich: Sinfonie Nr. 1, 5, 6, 9, 12. Paul Hindemith: Sinfonie Mathis der Maler, Sinfonische Metamorphosen. Arthur Honegger: Sinfonie Nr. 2, 3. Igor Strawinsky: Feuervogel, Petruschka, Jeu de cartes, Sinfonie in 3 Sätzen. Hanns Eisler: Kleine Sinfonie, Fünf Orchesterstücke. Ernst Hermann Meyer: Serenata pensierosa. Kurt Schwaen: Variationen für Streichorchester. Gerhard Rosenfeld: Offenbach-Eskapaden (premiere). Jan Hanuš: Notturni di Praga. Siegfried Matthus: Oboenkonzert, Die Windsbraut.
