= The BBC Sessions (Stephen Dale Petit album) =

- Cover shot by Pattie Boyd

Live album by Stephen Dale Petit
- Released: 2011
- Studio: BBC Studio 3 Maida Vale, London, BBC Radio 2 Studio Western House, London
- Genre: Blues, New blues, Blues rock, Rock.
- Label: 333 Records Ltd
- Producer: Stephen Dale Petit

Stephen Dale Petit chronology
The Crave (2010)	The BBC Sessions (2011)	Stephen Dale Petit At High Voltage (2012)

The BBC Sessions is the third album by Stephen Dale Petit, released on 5 December 2011, and is a compilation of specially commissioned BBC live recordings broadcast on BBC Radio 2’s Bob Harris and Paul Jones shows. Released in response to growing demand from Radio 2 listeners, the album features live versions of Petit’s own material as well as homages to staple songs within the blues genre. Covers include versions of John Mayall & The Bluesbreakers’ "Steppin’ Out", Albert King’s "When The Years Go Passing By" and Robert Johnson’s "Love In Vain". The album features guest appearances from former Rolling Stones guitarist Mick Taylor. The recordings took place at the BBC’s Studio 3 in Maida Vale, London and Bob Harris’ studio in the BBC's Radio 2 headquarters at Western House, London.

Speaking about the album, Mick Taylor stated: "I had a blast doing the Paul Jones Show with Stephen. I’ve worked with some great players over the years and I can tell you that the future of the blues is in good hands with SDP".

Following the initial sessions, BBC Radio's Bob Harris and Paul Jones both expressed support for Petit's cause, commenting: "Stephen Dale Petit is a magnificent musician, his playing uninhibited and passionate… he’s a carrier of the torch and a powerful advocate of the blues revolution. Long may he run." (Bob Harris) "Stephen joins the gap between the Alexis Corner era of blues in Britain and where it’s headed tomorrow. Enjoy these sessions - we did!" (Paul Jones)

== Release and artwork ==
The album was released on digipak CD with an 8-page colour booklet as well being made available for digital download. Petit also released a 1,000 copy limited edition pressing of the album for collectors.

The Cover Art for Stephen Dale Petit The BBC Sessions was taken by former model and iconic rock photographer Pattie Boyd. Amongst the 1,000 copies of the limited edition release there were 3 hidden golden tickets which winning fans could redeem to claim an 18 x 22 inch framed gallery print of the cover photograph, signed by both Petit and Boyd.

== Critical reception ==
Classic Rock Magazine scored the album 8/10 stars. Reviewer Henry Yates wrote of The BBC Sessions:

"[Petit] earns the plaudits on this compilation of three BBC sessions, locking in brilliantly with Taylor for an aching Love In Vain, playing stingingly assured lead on his own Sacramento [and] tears Jones a new arsehole with 7 Cent Cotton in 2007."

Petit and Taylor's version of "Love In Vain" featured in Classic Rock Magazine's "Heavy Rotation" list.

== Track listing ==
1. "Steppin’ Out" (Bracken)
2. "Sacramento" (Petit)
3. "As The Years Go Passing By" (Malone)
4. "7 Cent Cotton" (Petit)
5. "Goin’ Away Baby" (Lane)
6. "Love In Vain" (Johnson)
7. "Slide" (Petit, O’Toole)
8. "A Better Answer" (Petit)
9. "My Friend Bob" (Petit)
10. "It’s All Good" (Petit)
11. "A Better Answer" (Acoustic Version) (Petit)
12. "Bob Harris Interview"

== Personnel ==
=== Session 1 - Paul Jones Rhythm & Blues Show ===
Recorded at BBC Studio 3 Maida Vale, London on 17/01/2007

Broadcast: 01/03/2007

Produced and Engineered by Paul Long

1. Steppin’ Out
2. Sacramento
3. As The Years Go Passing By
4. 7 Cent Cotton
- Stephen Dale Petit - Vocals, guitar
- Franz Piombino - Bass guitar
- Rick Walsh - Drums
- Hannah Vasanth - Keyboards
- Snake Davis - Saxophone
- Roberto Manzin - Saxophone
- Martin Shaw - Trumpet

=== Session 2 - Paul Jones Rhythm & Blues Show ===
Recorded at BBC Studio 3 Maida Vale, London on 03/03/2009

Broadcast: 27/04/2009

Produced by Paul Long, Engineered by Mike Walter

1. Goin’ Away Baby
2. Love In Vain
3. Slide
4. A Better Answer
- Stephen Dale Petit - Vocals, guitar
- Mick Taylor - Guitar, slide guitar
- Chris Borud - Bass
- Gary O’Toole - Drums
- Laurent Mouflier - Harmonica
- David Moore - Keyboards

=== Session 3 - Bob Harris Show ===
Recorded at BBC Radio 2 Studio Western House, London on 29/09/2009

Broadcast: 03/10/2009

Produced by Mark Simpson

1. My Friend Bob
2. It's All Good
3. A Better Answer
4. Interview
- Stephen Dale Petit - Vocals, guitar
- Chris Borud - Bass
- Gary O’Toole - Drums
- Laurent Mouflier - Harmonica
