= Michael Helmrath =

German oboist and conductor (born 1954)

Michael Helmrath (born 15 April 1954) is a German oboist and conductor and since the 2016/2017 season, active as general music director of the Theater Nordhausen/Loh-Orchester Sondershausen.

== Life ==
Born in Wuppertal, after studying oboe and conducting at the Hochschule für Musik und Tanz Köln, Helmrath first embarked on a career as an oboist, which led him as principal oboist to the Münchner Philharmoniker and Sergiu Celibidache, who recognised and promoted him as a conductor.

In 1989, he founded the Munich Philharmonic Chamber Orchestra, consisting of the first desks of the Munich Philharmonic Orchestra with its own concert series at the Philharmonie. From 2000 to 2015, he was general music director of the Brandenburger Symphoniker, which was nominated as "Orchestra of the Year" by the magazine Opernwelt under his direction.

In addition to the classical opera and concert repertoire, he also deals with Neue Musik, and numerous works were premiered under his direction. In addition, there exists numerous radio and television recordings, as well as CD recordings.

Since the 2016/2017 season, Helmrath has been the general music director of the Theater Nordhausen/Loh-Orchester Sondershausen tätig.

== Professional positions ==
=== Positions ===
- Solo oboist at the Münchner Philharmoniker
- Generalmusikdirektor of the Brandenburger Symphoniker
- Generalmusikdirektor of the Theater Nordhausen/Loh-Orchester Sondershausen

=== Guest conductor ===
==== Germany ====
among others:

- Orchesterakademie Schleswig-Holstein Musik Festival
- Sächsische Staatskapelle Dresden
- Dresdner Sinfoniker
- Rundfunk-Sinfonieorchester Berlin
- Gürzenich Orchestra Cologne
- NDR Radiophilharmonie
- Kammerorchester Berlin
- Philharmonisches Staatsorchester Halle
- Stuttgarter Philharmoniker
- Hessisches Staatstheater Wiesbaden
- Nürnberger Symphoniker
- Thüringische Philharmonie
- Cologne Opera
- Hessisches Staatstheater Wiesbaden

==== Abroad ====
among others:

- Jerusalem Symphony Orchestra
- China National Symphony Orchestra
- Daejeon Philharmonic Orchestra
- Gwangju Symphonic Orchestra
- Orchestra Sinfonica Sanremo
- Croatian National Theatre in Zagreb
- Rijeka Nationaltheater
- Ljubljana Summer Festival
- Miskolc Opera Festival

== Recordings ==
Composer	Title	Orchestra	Label
Johann Baptist Vanhal	Vier Sinfonien	Philharmonisches Kammerorchester Munich	Orfeo C 320 941 A
Leoš Janáček	Suite, Idyla und Adagio	Philharmonisches Kammerorchester Munich	Orfeo C 281 921 A
Werke von Yusupov, Kantscheli, Amirov und Tertarjan	Musik aus Tadschikistan, Georgien, Aserbaidschan und Armenien	Dresdner Sinfoniker	ArteNova / BMG (2 CD) 74321 82556
Ludwig van Beethoven	Klavierkonzerte Nr. 1 und Nr. 3	Carmen Piazzini Bayerische Kammerphilharmonie	Gutingi 212
Ludwig van Beethoven	Klavierkonzerte Nr. 2 und Nr. 4	Carmen Piazzini Bayerische Kammerphilharmonie	Gutingi 206
Ludwig van Beethoven	Klavierkonzert Nr. 5 2 Romanzen (arr.: Hummel)	Carmen Piazzini, Klavier Radio-Philharmonie Hannover	Gutingi 213
L. Subramaniam	Shanti Priya Double Concerto	L. Subramaniam, ind. Violine Michael Marin Kofler, Flöte Brandenburger Symphoniker	duo-phon-records Best.-Nr. 11 02 3
Rodrigo, Clerch, Walton, Strawinsky, de Falla	Werke für Gitarre und Orchester	Joaquin Clerch, guitar Brandenburger Symphoniker	duo-phon-records Best.-Nr. 11 01 3
Daniel Schnyder	among others SubZero	Stefan Schulz, Bassposaune Rundfunk-SInfonieorchester Berlin	BIS-CD-1774 EAN 7318590017746
Antonín Dvořák	Cellokonzert h-moll, Rondo, Waldesruh	Peter Bruns, Violoncello Staatskapelle Dresden	hänssler classic 98.478
Werke von Hiller, Prokofjew, Ramirez und Bat Chaim	Concert for the Klezmer	Giora Feidman, Klarinette Philharmonisches Kammerorchester München	BMG 883 388
Wilfried Hiller	Der Geigenseppel (after Wilhelm Busch)	Peter Striebeck, Erzähler Bayerische Kammerphilharmonie	DGG 463 907-2
Jörg Widmoser / Duke Ellington	Orchestral work	Jörg Widmoser (violin) and Band Brandenburger Symphoniker	Pool 65993
Rainer Rubbert	Kleist Oper (Live Mitschnitt)	Brandenburger Symphoniker	duo-phon-records Best.-Nr. 11 03 3
Ibert, Michat	Werke für Saxophon und Orchester	Asya Fateyeva, Saxophon Brandenburger Symphoniker	Genuin Best.-Nr. GEN 16401
