= Francesco Lo Castro =

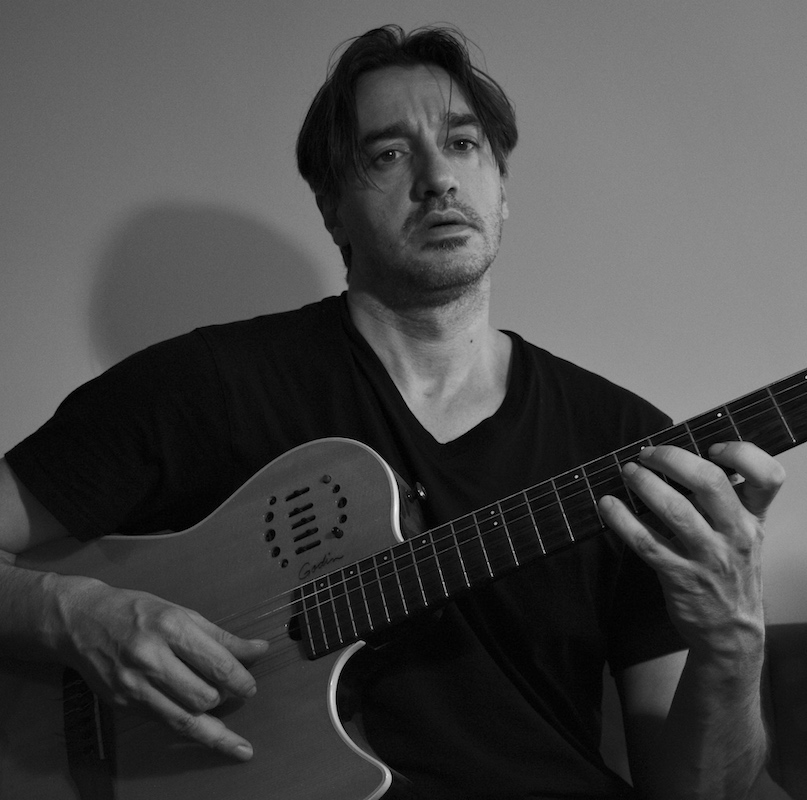

Background information
- Born: January 1974 (age 52); Salerno, Italy
- Genres: Jazz
- Occupation: Musician
- Instrument: Guitar
- Website: www.flocastro.com

Francesco Lo Castro (born in January 1974) is a London-based guitarist, composer, multi-instrumentalist and lecturer. As of 2019, Francesco has released six albums under his own name and one with the DLC Project.

== Biography ==
Born in Salerno, Italy in 1974, guitarist and composer Francesco Lo Castro started studying guitar at 25. He developed his guitar style and technique under the tutoring of Gianni Cataleta. He graduated with honors in music performance from a BMus at Thames Valley University (London). In the same year, he won the Best Guitarist Award at the Guitar Institute in London, where he attended tutoring classes by Shaun Baxter and Iain Scott. He then earned a scholarship for MMus, completed in 2008, by winning the Vice Chancellor's Award at TVU.

In the same period he performed in clubs, pubs, and theaters around the world, playing with jazz, funk, pop and rock musicians. In 2009, he was offered to teach Guitar Technique on the Degree Course held by Academy of Music and Sound (Wolverhampton University).

Francesco has produced seven albums, six under his own name and one with the DLC Project.

== Performing with others ==
Lo Castro has collaborated with Jim Mullen (Morrisey-Mullen), Geoff Wilkinson (Us3) and performed with contemporary musicians such Francesco Mendolia (Incognito), [[Richard Sadler]] (Neil Cowley Trio), Damien Nolan (VV Brown), Roberto Manzin (James Brown), Italian trumpeter Fulvio Sigurta, two-time Grammy Award Winner Eric DeFade, Matteo Becucci (XFactor Italy winner 2009), jazz singer Michela Lombardi, Maurizio Minardi, and Bruno D'Ambra. He has toured with Patrizio Buanne in the U.S., Australia, Asia, Europe and Sounth Africa, and also produced and performed on Steven Bryan's latest two albums One Way and Gravity Always Wins.

Lo Castro has performed in venues and festivals, including the Montreal Jazz Festival, Hamer Hall (Melbourne), the State Theater (Sydney), the Concert Hall (New York), the Expo Center (Singapore), the Berklee Performance Center (Boston), the Benedum (Pittsburgh), Barbican Center (London), O2 Arena (London), the Pisa Jazz Festival, and Palatrussardi Arena (Milan).

"Dresden" from the album Chasing Beauty is in the Top 200 "Most Downloaded of All Time" chart compiled by All About Jazz.

== Discography ==
- From Distant Shores (2015)
- DLC PROJECT Into the Unknown (2014)
- Chasing Beauty (2013)
- While We Hope and Dream (2013)
- Songs for Duke (2012)
- Electric Affairs (2011)
- Improfives (2010)
