= Kleist Theater =

Coordinates: 52.3450°N 14.5155°E

The Kleist Theater was a theatre and opera house in Frankfurt (Oder), Germany. It opened in 1945 and was named after Heinrich von Kleist (born in the city) in 1952. It closed in 2000.
