= Jacaranda Ensemble =

German instrumental ensemble

Jacaranda is an instrumental ensemble founded in 1997 and composed of five musicians and soloists of the Brandenburger Symphoniker. With its music, the ensemble wants to build a bridge between the cultures of the world.

Jacaranda play on alphorns, didgeridoos, saxophones, marimba, congas and other percussion instruments a mixture of composed and improvised music in which elements from classical, blues, folk and jazz are combined with each other.

Concert tours have taken the Jacaranda Ensemble through Germany, the US, Austria, Estonia, Great Britain, Liechtenstein, Egypt, Lebanon and several times to China, Oman, Spain and Luxembourg.

In 2006, the ensemble won the German world music competition Creole in Berlin. In recognition of its artistic work to date, the Jacaranda Ensemble was awarded the first Art Promotion Prize of the State of Brandenburg in January 2013.
