= Hermann Josef Nellessen =

German composer and conductor

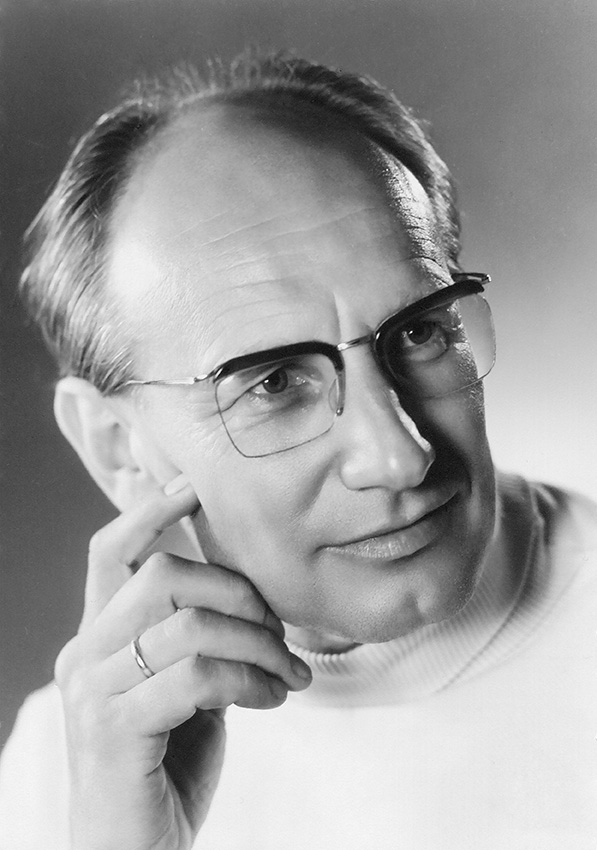
- Born: 29 April 1923; Aachen, Occupied Ruhr
- Died: 4 August 2004 (aged 81); Berlin, Germany
- Education: Hochschule für Musik und Tanz Köln
- Era: 20th century
- Employer: Hochschule für Musik Hanns Eisler Berlin
- Political party: LDPD
- Movement: Liberal socialism

Hermann Josef Nellessen (29 April 1923 – 2004) was a German composer and conductor.

== Life ==
Born in Aachen, Nellessen studied piano and conducting with Hermann Abendroth at the Hochschule für Musik und Tanz Köln. In 1954, he moved to East Germany, where he worked as musical director at the theatres in Brandenburg and Cottbus and as director of the Neubrandenburg State Symphony Orchestra.

Nellessen was a member of the Liberal Democratic Party of Germany (LPDP). In March 1977, he was elected as a member of the Central Executive Committee of the LDPD at the 12th Party Congress of the LDPD in Weimar.

From 1979, Nellessen worked as a lecturer at the Hochschule für Musik "Hanns Eisler" in Berlin. His compositional work concentrated on symphonic and concertante works. From the 1980s, he increasingly turned to choral music.

== Work ==
His œuvre includes numerous choral works, folk song arrangements and settings of texts and poems.

=== Collaboration ===
- Der Mond ist aufgegangen
- Still, weil's Kindlein schlafen will
- O Tannenbaum, du trägst ein grünes Kleid
- Süßer die Glocken nie klingen after "Süßer die Glocken nie klingen"
- Sah ein Knab ein Röslein steh'n
- Wenn ich ein Vöglein wär

=== Choral pieces ===
- Ein gutes Tier ist das Klavier (text by Wilhelm Busch)
- Es wollt ein Jägerlein Jagen
- Die Nachtigall
- Ich wollte in der Stille sein

== Honours ==
Nellessen was awarded the Carl Blechen and the Fritz Reuter prizes.
