= The Crave =

Studio album by Stephen Dale Petit
- Released: 26 July 2010
- Recorded: 2009–2010
- Genre: Blues; new blues; blues rock
- Length: 67:49
- Language: English
- Label: 333 Records
- Producer: Stephen Dale Petit/ Ian Grimble

Stephen Dale Petit chronology
Guitararama (2008)	The Crave (2010)	The BBC Sessions (2011)

The Crave is the second studio album by Stephen Dale Petit, released on the 26 July 2010. It features guest appearances from former Rolling Stones guitarist Mick Taylor, original Rolling Stones bassist and Pretty Things guitarist Dick Taylor and keyboardist Max Middleton.

The album contains original material and covers of staple songs within the blues genre. Covers include versions of Albert King's "As The Years Go Passing By," "Need Your Love So Bad" (most famously covered by Fleetwood Mac) and a re-interpretation of Robert Johnson's "Cross Road Blues." Speaking to Blues Matters! magazine, Petit addressed the potential controversy involved with re-working seminal, "sacred" blues recordings:

"These songs were dead. My so-called desecration [of the original versions] was an act of love. I feel a wonderment and enchantment about these songs, which is why I recorded them. If the blues is to grow and thrive it has to evolve."

== Recording and production ==
Recording sessions for The Crave took place at Chapel Studios, Lincoln and 2 kHz Studios, London. The Crave was produced by Stephen Dale Petit and mixed by Jim Spencer (New Order, Johnny Marr, The Vaccines) and Ian Grimble (The Clash, Red Hot Chili Peppers, Manic Street Preachers).

Additional recording took place at British Grove Studios, Metropolis Studios, and The Smokehouse and at Petit's home studio.

=== Guest appearances ===
Mick Taylor features on slide guitar on "Slide." Dick Taylor plays bass on "Need Your Love So Bad." Max Middleton features on final track "Hole in My Soul."

String arrangements for The Crave were orchestrated by Chris Elliot.

Rolling Stone Ronnie Wood appears on album opener "3 Gunslingers" in the form of a pre-recorded answer phone message that features at the intro of the song, which was inspired by an evening in late 2009 which Petit spent with Wood and Eric Clapton driving around North London in Petit's car. The song's lyrics chronicle that evening.

== Concept and influences ==
In keeping with his long-standing and well-publicised mission to incite a "New Blues Revolution", Petit has stated that his primary goal with the album was to "explore different ways of approaching and presenting the blues", and avoid re-creating stereotypes within the genre: "There are a lot of contemporary blues albums that adhere to predictable conventions: certain production values, arrangements, sonic cliches, stereotypical lyrical things and so on. I had zero interest in making an album like that… I wanted the music coming out of the speakers to sound like it was, say, 1935 or 1954 or whenever and 2010 simultaneously."

The Crave was celebrated by critics for its musical diversity. Classic Rock magazine described the album as moving "from Gospel to Punk via several shades of Boogie". Petit stated that he intended The Crave to serve as a wide-lens view of the Blues as a genre, demonstrating its presence in a wide variety of genres and demonstrating the widespread influence of the Blues on other genres. Speaking to Classic Rock magazine about the album's interpretation of Tupac Shakur's hip-hop classic "California Love", Petit said: "The hypnotic riff in California [Love] was sampled from a Joe Cocker song called 'Woman to Woman'. That riff is Deep Blues. Blues is at the core of Tupac's song. If people can't hear that… Well, you know, there were people in the 50s and 60s who said that electric blues, city blues, was not blues, thereby discounting the entire Chess Records catalogue."

== Artwork ==
The album sleeve features a vibrant, contemporary design. Petit wanted to present the album in a way that was visually exciting, avoiding the usual presentation cliches associated with the blues genre: "I wanted to push boundaries and get up [blues] purist's noses because if purists have it their way, the music goes nowhere. It just dies."

The cover was designed by award-winning multi-media artist Oli Max. The remainder of the album's artwork and packaging were designed by Monosapien and Olimax.

== Critical reception ==
The album marked an expansion of critical recognition from blues-centric publications into the mainstream press for Petit and his music. Upon the album's release, Petit was featured in The Times, MOJO, The Independent, The Sunday Times, Classic Rock and The Express, with the general consensus being that The Crave signalled his evolution and maturation as an artist. Blues Matters! magazine said: "[Petit] has expanded his playing, developed his songwriting and really delivered some fine numbers. His playing is dynamite, his vocals are exultant… This is absolutely the most personal album that has been released this year and possibly the most important – simply brilliant."

The album was listed in Classic Rock magazine's "50 Best Albums Of The Year". "Cali Guitar Hero starts Blues Renaissance" said MOJO magazine, continuing that "The Crave puts the blues in a contemporary context." The Times praised the album's "raw, fresh energy" and The Sunday Times Culture Magazine ran a lengthy feature on Petit and The Crave. The Sunday Mirror called Petit "a guitar sensation" and Time Out London labelled him a "new blues revolutionary".

The Crave also received widespread positive reviews online. Loudhorizon.com wrote: "The Crave is a seventeen track masterpiece. This album should see Petit vie for King of the Blues title." BRFM.com likened The Crave to seminal album London Calling by The Clash: "[The Crave is] Fabulous. The mastery of styles had me thinking of London Calling by The Clash. By the time the last song finishes all you can do is hit repeat."

== Track listing ==
All songs were written by Stephen Dale Petit, except where noted.

1. "3 Gunslingers" – 3:49
2. "California" (Tupac Shakur, Dr. Dre, Roger Troutman, Woodrow Cunningham Norman Durham) – 4:10
3. "Let There Be More Light" (SDP, Chris Elliott) – 6:11
4. "Gun Song" – 5:09
5. "Soul Survivor" (SDP, Chris Borud, Gary O' Toole) – 4:23
6. "Need Your Love So Bad" (Mertis John Jr) – 5:08
7. "Judgement Day" – 1:42
8. "Cross Road Blues" (Robert Johnson) – 4:19
9. "Open" – 3:02
10. "The Crave" (SDP, Laurent Mouflier, Chris Belshaw, Federico Ariano) – 5:17
11. "Lookin' For Trouble" – 2:33
12. "Slide" (SDP, Gary O' Toole) – 3:50
13. "As The Years Go Passing By" (Deadric Malone) – 3:47
14. "Sunnyland Stomp" – 1:11
15. "It's All Good" – 2:59
16. "Voodoo Lover" – 5:01
17. "Hole In My Soul" – 7:58

== Personnel ==
- Stephen Dale Petit – guitar, vocals, backing vocals, bass, melotron, Hammond organ, piano, maracas and shakers
- Chris Borud – bass
- Gary O' Toole – drums, backing vocals
- Laurent Mouflier – harp
- Martin Ditcham – percussion

Additional musicians

- Mick Taylor – guitar on "Slide"
- Dick Taylor – bass on "Need Your Love So Bad"
- Max Middleton – Fender Rhodes on "Hole in My Soul"
- Chris Elliot – string and horn arrangement, piano and drums on "California", "Let There Be More Light", "Need Your Love So Bad", "Judgement Day", "As The Years Go Passing By" and "Hole in My Soul"
- London Studio Orchestra – strings on "California"
- Samuel Dixon – bass on "Let There Be More Light"
- Mark St. John – drums on "Need Your Love So Bad"
- Damon Wilson – drums on "Let There Be More Light"
- Bob Knight – drums on "Hole in My Soul"
- Pete Davis – keyboards on "California" and "The Crave"
- Dave Moore – Hammond organ and piano on "Soul Survivor", "It's All Good' and "Voodoo Lover"
- Thomas Ross Johansen – Hammond organ on "Let There Be More Light"
- Frank Ricotti – vibes on "Cross Road Blues"
- Angela Brooks – backing vocals on "California", "Let There Be More Light", "Judgement Day", "The Crave", "Slide", "As The Years Go Passing By" and "It's All Good"
- TJ Davis – backing vocals on "California", "Let There Be More Light", "Judgement Day", "The Crave", "Slide" and "It's All Good"
- Gino Williams, Mark Harrison and Anna Ross – backing vocals on "California" and "Judgement Day"
- Richard Edwards, Dave Bishop, Dave Stewart Horns, Mike Smith and Jamie Talbot – horns on "California", "Cross Road Blues" and "As The Years Go Passing By"
- Roberto Manzin and Paul Spong – horns on "Let There Be More Light" and "It's All Good"
- Martin Loveday, Dave Daniels, Antony Pleeth, Peter Lale, Bruce White, Vicci Wardman, Perry Montague-Mason, Chris Tombling, Emlyn Singleton, Boguslaw Kostecki, Patrick Kiernan and Warren Zielinski – strings on "Cross Road Blues" and "As The Years Go Passing By"
- Wired Strings – strings on "Hole in My Soul"
- Produced by Stephen Dale Petit
- "California" and "Let There Be More Light" produced by Ian Grimble/Stephen Dale Petit
- Mixed by Jim Spencer and Stephen Dale Petit at Chapel Studios
- "California", "Open" and "As the Years Go Passing By" mixed by Ian Grimble at 2 kHz Studios
- Mastered by Andy Jackson
