= 100 Club =

Music venue in London, England

Coordinates: 51°30′58″N 0°8′7.3″W

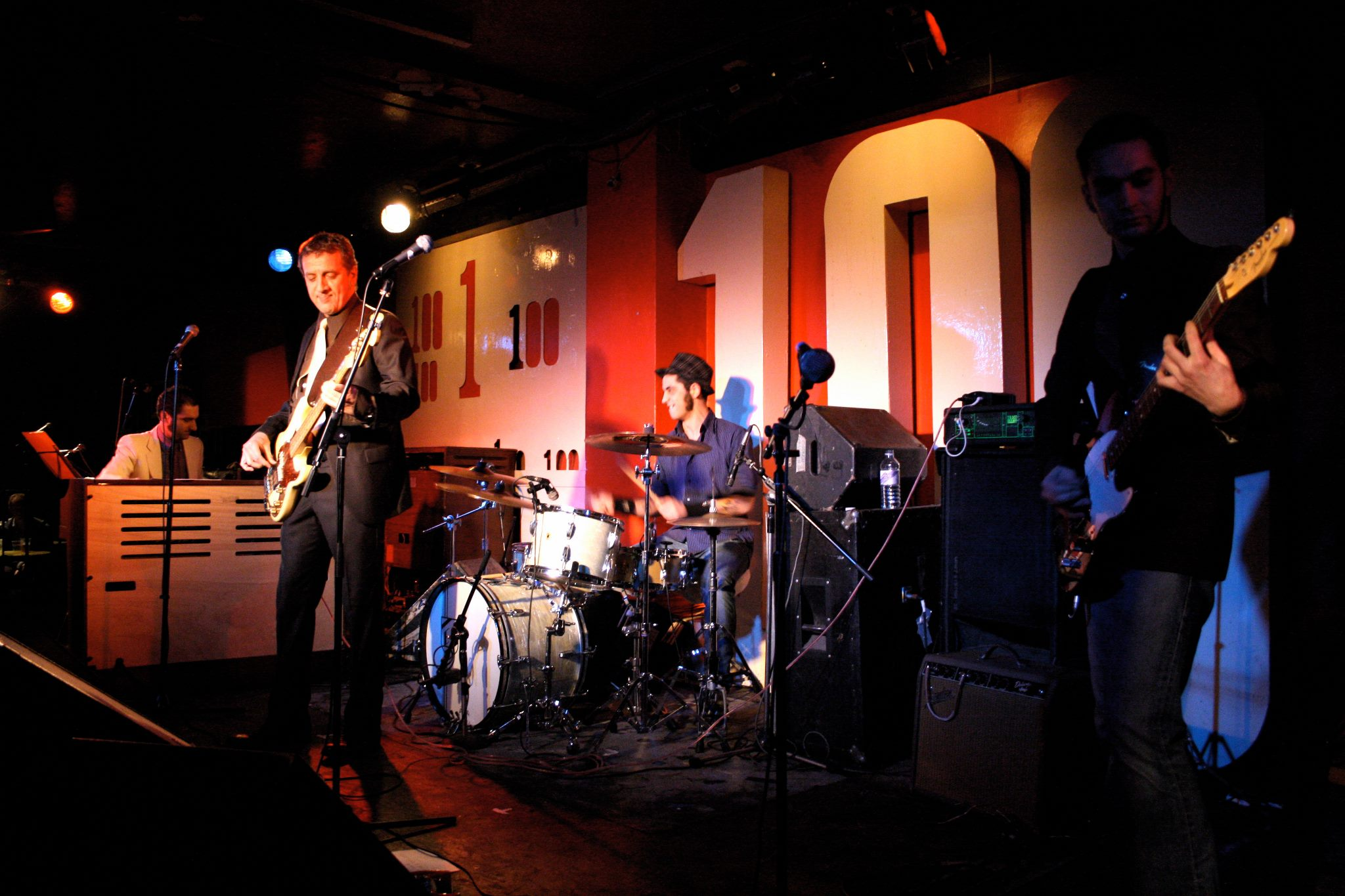
- Link Quartet on stage at the 100 Club in 2011
- Interactive map of 100 Club
- Location: Oxford Street; London, W1
- Capacity: 350
- Public transit: Tottenham Court Road

Construction
- Opened: 1942; 84 years ago

Website
- the100club.co.uk

The 100 Club is a music venue located at 100 Oxford Street, Westminster, England, where it has been hosting live music since 24 October 1942. It was originally called the Feldman Swing Club, but changed its name when the father of the current owner took over in 1964.

== Feldman Swing Club ==
In 1942, the venue was a restaurant called Macks, which was rented to Robert Feldman every Sunday evening at £4 per night to host a jazz club featuring swing music. The initial line-up of the Feldman Swing Club advertised in Melody Maker included Frank Weir, Kenny Baker and Jimmy Skidmore, with guest artists the Feldman Trio, composed of Feldman's children, including then eight-year-old jazz drummer Victor Feldman.

The club's clientele included American GIs, who introduced jitterbug to the club, banned at most other music venues. Patrons included Glenn Miller, who auditioned young Victor Feldman, and the club hosted many top American jazz acts, including Mel Powell, Ray McKinley, Art Pepper, and Benny Goodman. Bebop as well as swing was featured. British musicians such as Ronnie Scott and Johnny Dankworth performed there. The club became a mecca for black musicians from the British Empire, such as Frank Holder, Coleridge Goode and Ray Ellington.

The club was eventually taken over by Lyn Dutton, Humphrey Lyttelton's manager, and during that period, Louis Armstrong appeared at the venue. The lease was sold on to Ted Morton, who promoted it as the Jazz Shows Jazz Club. During this period, jazz fan Roger Horton began working at the club and was promoted to manager in 1964.

== 1970s onward ==
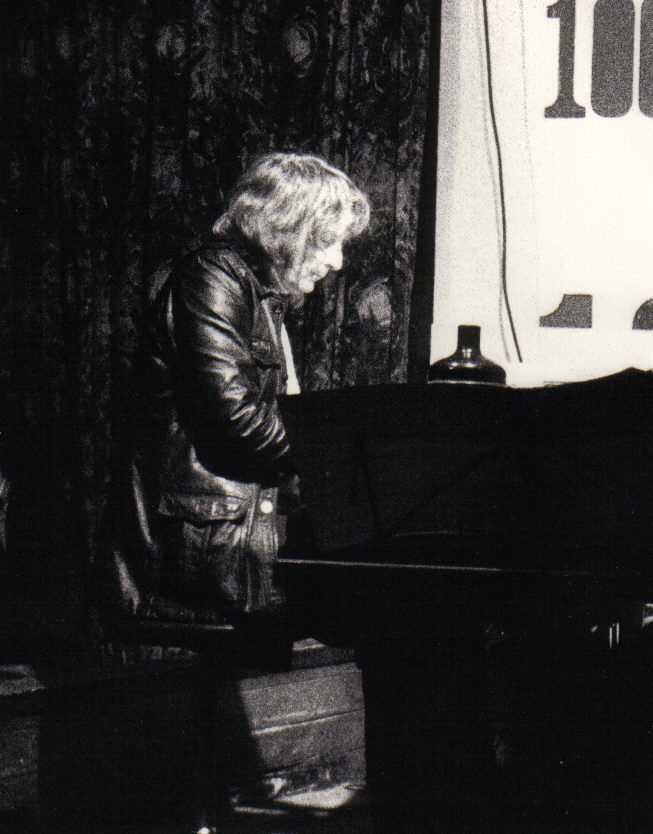
Stan Tracey performing in the 1980s

Following the Trad boom and UK beat scene the club became associated with Punk rock. In September 1976, the 100 Club played host to the first international punk festival, an event which helped to push the then new punk rock movement from the underground into the mainstream. Bands which played at this event included the Sex Pistols, Siouxsie and the Banshees, The Clash, Buzzcocks, Subway Sect, The Stranglers and The Damned.

Under the promotion of Ron Watts, the venue then booked punk bands like Angelic Upstarts, U.K. Subs and The Adicts, as well as, from 1981 onwards, hardcore punk bands such as The Varukers, Black Flag, Discharge, Charged GBH, Crass, Picture Frame Seduction, Skrewdriver, English Dogs, etc. Several live albums were recorded at the club, including one by the Sex Pistols.

On 31 May 1982, The Rolling Stones played an unannounced show there as a warm-up for their European tour, and returned again on 23 February 1986 to play a tribute show for their recently deceased pianist Ian Stewart, a concert that was their only live performance between 1982 and 1989.

Other nights would see a range of jazz, rhythm-and-blues and soul groups on the stage, including a "duel" between tenor saxophonists Teddy Edwards and Dick Morrissey in the 1980s. Other notable jazz musicians, including Sonny Stitt, Lee Konitz and Archie Shepp, have also appeared at the club.

Manager Roger Horton eventually became a director, and in 1992 took over the ownership, handing it on to his son Jeffrey Horton when he retired in 2001.

== Northern soul ==
The 100 Club has been the home to the world longest running Northern soul all-nighters, the 6t's Rhythm 'n' Soul Club, started by Randy Cozens and Ady Croasdell of Kent Records UK. The 6t's had their 31st anniversary event on 18 September 2010.

== Modern era ==
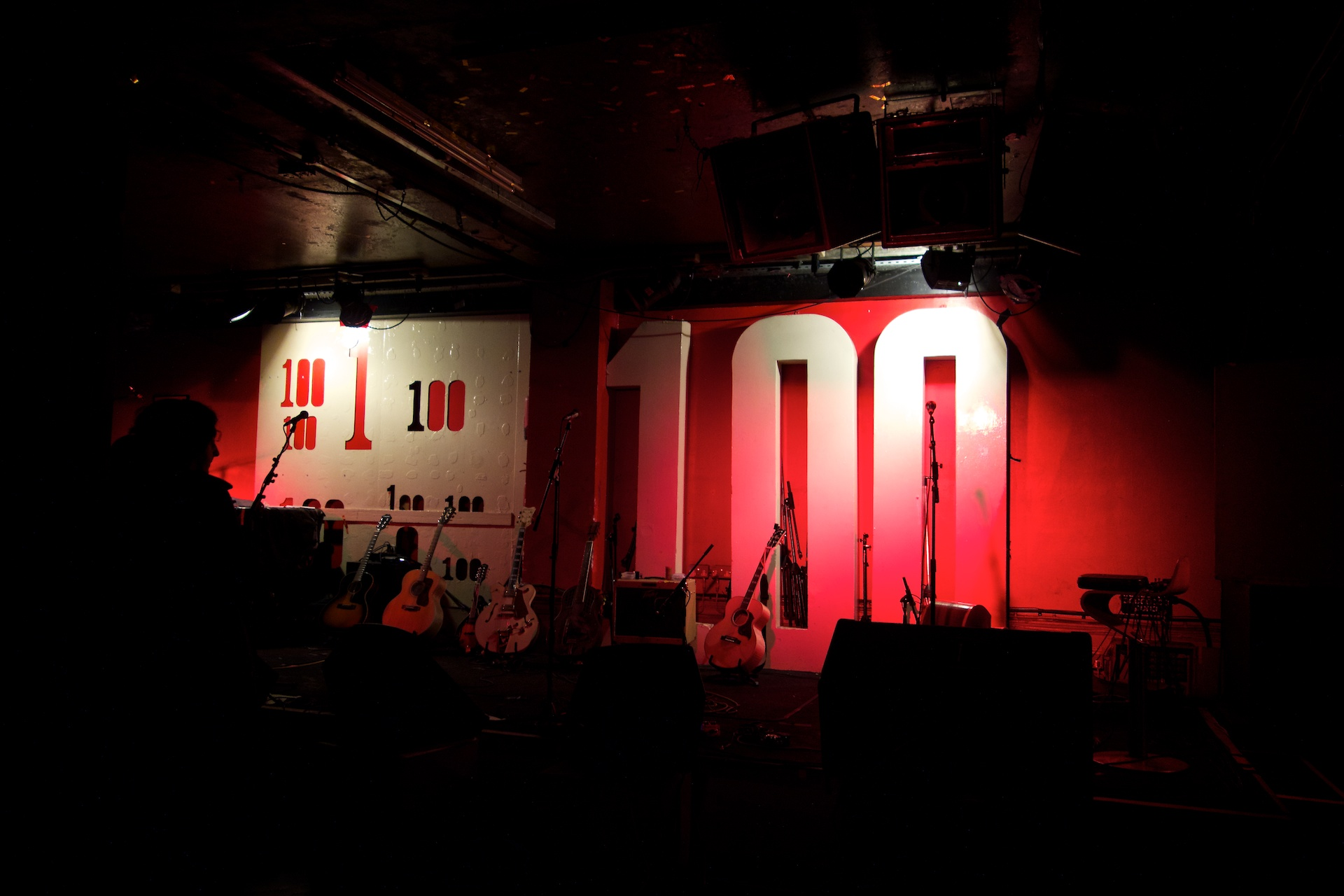
The 100 Club stage

The decor remains unchanged since the 1970s, although punk bands no longer appear there regularly. Instead there is a busy programme often booked up many months in advance. Occasionally, big-name touring bands will play "secret" or low-key unadvertised gigs there, relying on word of mouth to fill the 350-capacity space. The "Coda Club", a monthly social gathering of jazz musicians from the Feldman Swing Club era, continues to be held. Limelight changed the venue's musical genre once again, providing "classical music in a rock'n'roll setting", hosting new or well-established classical artists once a month, Since 1988, the London Swing Dance Society have held "Stompin" on Monday nights, a swing dancing evening with classes and regular live bands.

In 2009 Feldman's Swing Club was named by the Brecon Jazz Festival as one of 12 venues which had made the most important contributions to jazz music in the United Kingdom, for its contributions in the 1942–1954 period.

In September 2010, it was announced that the 100 Club would close at the end of 2010 owing to continuing losses. A campaign was launched, the Save The 100 Club, to keep the venue open, supported by musicians including Paul McCartney, and in February 2011 a partnership with Nike subsidiary Converse was arranged, enabling the 100 Club to remain open. DEF Digby were the first band to play at the venue in 2012.

Recent acts to headline The 100 Club include Shame, Alice Cooper, Fat White Family, Black Midi, The Specials, Sisteray, Babyshambles, Idles, Dr. Feelgood and Sleaford Mods.

In June 2023, the Buzzcocks headlined at the 100 Club, a warm up gig to their upcoming tour without their guitarist/singer Pete Shelley who had died nearly five years earlier. In autumn 2023, veteran punk band the U.K. Subs played a five-night sold out residency at the 100 Club in a culmination of their final British tour. The residency was attended by Stuart Pearce, a lifelong fan of punk rock.

== See also ==
- 100 Club Punk Special
