= Rarestonebowie =

Compilation album by David Bowie
- Released: May 1995
- Recorded: 1972–1978
- Length: 36:39
- Labels: Golden Years (UK); Griffin Music (US); Mecca (Japan)

David Bowie chronology
Santa Monica '72 (1994)	Rarestonebowie (1995)	Outside (1995)

David Bowie compilation chronology
The Singles Collection (1993)	Rarestonebowie (1995)	BBC Sessions 1969–1972 (Sampler) (1996)

Professional ratings
Review scores
Source	Rating
AllMusic	2/5 stars

Rarestonebowie is a compilation album by English musician David Bowie. This release was one in the series of mid-nineties releases by MainMan, Bowie's former management company during the seventies (other ones being Santa Monica '72 and the Ava Cherry & The Astronettes album People from Bad Homes). All these albums were released without Bowie's approval and are currently out of print.

== Track listing ==
In 1995 Trident Music International released the Rarestonebowie compilation CD in the United Kingdom on the Golden Years label (Catalog # GY 014).

The pregap before track one, "All the Young Dudes", contains an RCA Records 1973 radio advertisement for the David Bowie album Pin Ups.

Rarestonebowie
No.	Title	Writer(s)	Length
1.	"All the Young Dudes" ((mislabeled) liner notes: "original studio version 1973"; alternative mono recording 1972 December; same as 1997 remastered The Best of David Bowie 1969/1974, and 2003 bonus tracks of Aladdin Sane)	Bowie	4:10
2.	"Queen Bitch" (performed 1976 March 23rd; Nassau Coliseum, Uniondale, New York)	Bowie	3:15
3.	"Sound and Vision" (performed 1978 July 1st; Earls Court, London)	Bowie	3:24
4.	"Time" (performed 1973 October 20th; for the 1980 Floor show Marquee Club, London)	Bowie	5:12
5.	"Be My Wife" (performed 1978 July 1st; Earls Court, London)	Bowie	2:44
6.	"Footstompin' / I Wish I Could Shimmy Like My Sister Kate" (1974 December 4th; the Dick Cavett show)	Aaron Collins, Ande Rand / Armand Piron, Clarence Williams	3:24
7.	"Ziggy Stardust" (performed 1972 October 20th; Santa Monica Civic Auditorium, Santa Monica, California; same as 1994 bootleg release Santa Monica '72, and 2008 official release Live Santa Monica '72)	Bowie	3:21
8.	"My Death" (performed 1972 September 28th; Carnegie Hall, New York)	Eric Blau, Jacques Brel, Mort Shuman	5:49
9.	"I Feel Free" (performed 1972 May 6th; Kingston Polytechnic, London)	Pete Brown, Jack Bruce	5:23
Total length:			36:39

Rarestonebowie was reissued in Japan with Bonus tracks; by Dolphin Entertainment (Catalog # BLCK-86008) on 1998 August 19, and by Mecca Records (Catalog # BLCY-1019) on 2002 March 26.

Bonus tracks
No.	Title	Writer(s)	Length
10.	"Hang on to Yourself" (performed 1972 October 20th; Santa Monica Civic Auditorium, Santa Monica, California; same as 1994 bootleg release Santa Monica '72, and 2008 official release Live Santa Monica '72)	Bowie	2:52
11.	"Changes" (performed 1972 October 20th; Santa Monica Civic Auditorium, Santa Monica, California)	Bowie	3:32
12.	"I'm Waiting for the Man" (performed 1972 October 20th; Santa Monica Civic Auditorium, Santa Monica, California)	Lou Reed	5:50
13.	"The Jean Genie" (performed 1972 October 20th; Santa Monica Civic Auditorium, Santa Monica, California)	Bowie	4:22
14.	"Suffragette City" (performed 1972 October 20th; Santa Monica Civic Auditorium, Santa Monica, California)	Bowie	4:25
15.	"Rock 'n' Roll Suicide" (performed 1972 October 20th; Santa Monica Civic Auditorium, Santa Monica, California)	Bowie	3:19
Total length:			61:00
