= Ziggy Stardust =

Ziggy Stardust was a glam alter ego of musician David Bowie in the early 1970s. It may refer specifically to:

- Ziggy Stardust (character)
- The Rise and Fall of Ziggy Stardust and the Spiders from Mars, often shortened to Ziggy Stardust, a 1972 concept album by David Bowie
  - "Ziggy Stardust" (song), a song from the album
- Ziggy Stardust Tour, a 1972–73 concert tour by David Bowie to promote that album and its follow-up Aladdin Sane
- Ziggy Stardust and the Spiders from Mars (film), a 1979 documentary and concert film about the tour
  - Ziggy Stardust: The Motion Picture, a 1983 released live album the soundtrack of that film

== Other uses ==
- The Ziggy Stardust, a haircut
