= Ziggy Stardust (song) =

1972 song by David Bowie

- Cover of the 1994 live single version

Song by David Bowie

from the album The Rise and Fall of Ziggy Stardust and the Spiders from Mars
- Released: 16 June 1972
- Recorded: 11 November 1971
- Studio: Trident, London
- Genre: Glam rock
- Length: 3:13
- Label: RCA
- Songwriter: David Bowie
- Producers: David Bowie; Ken Scott

Music video
- "Ziggy Stardust" on YouTube

"Ziggy Stardust" is a song by the English singer-songwriter David Bowie from his fifth studio album The Rise and Fall of Ziggy Stardust and the Spiders from Mars (1972). The song was recorded at Trident Studios in London in November 1971 with his backing band the Spiders from Mars, comprising Mick Ronson, Trevor Bolder and Mick Woodmansey. It was co-produced by Bowie and Ken Scott. Lyrically, the song is about Ziggy Stardust, a bisexual alien rock star who acts as a messenger for extraterrestrial beings. The character was influenced by English singer Vince Taylor, as well as the Legendary Stardust Cowboy and Kansai Yamamoto. Although Ziggy is introduced earlier on the album, this song is its centrepiece, presenting the rise and fall of the star in a very human-like manner. Musically, it is a glam rock song, like its parent album, and is based around a Ronson guitar riff.

Since its release, "Ziggy Stardust" has received widespread acclaim from music critics, with the majority praising its story, guitar riff and the band's performance. The song has since been included on lists of Bowie's greatest songs, and by some as one of the greatest songs of all time. Rolling Stone ranked it number 282 on their list of The 500 Greatest Songs of All Time in 2010. The track is also one of four of Bowie's songs included in The Rock and Roll Hall of Fame's 500 Songs that Shaped Rock and Roll. Bowie performed the song frequently on the Ziggy Stardust and 1978 Stage tours, and again during his tours in the 2000s.

The song was covered by the English gothic rock band Bauhaus in 1982; their version peaked at number 15 on the UK Singles Chart. While Bowie's original recording was never released as a single, a live version from 1972 was released as a single in France in 1994 to promote the bootleg album Santa Monica '72. The song has since appeared on multiple compilation albums and has been remastered several times, including in 2012 for its 40th anniversary; this remaster was included in the box set Five Years (1969–1973) in 2015.

== Composition ==
Bowie wrote "Ziggy Stardust" and fellow album track "Lady Stardust" "within days" of each other in early 1971. According to biographer Nicholas Pegg, it was registered with Bowie's publisher Chrysalis as early as April 1971, before the recording sessions for Hunky Dory (1971). Bowie recorded an acoustic demo of the track between February and March 1971 at Radio Luxembourg's studios in London, around the same time he recorded "Moonage Daydream" and "Hang On to Yourself" with his band Arnold Corns. This demo was released as a bonus track on the Rykodisc CD release of Ziggy Stardust in 1990. The demo also appeared on the Ziggy Stardust – 30th Anniversary Reissue bonus disc in 2002.

The album version was recorded at Trident Studios in London on 11 November 1971. Co-produced by Ken Scott, Bowie recorded it with his backing band known as the Spiders from Mars—comprising Mick Ronson, Trevor Bolder and Mick Woodmansey. Musically, it is a glam rock song, like its parent album, that is based around a riff containing both tonic and dominant chords (the latter with a "hammered 4th"), followed by a "shifting-bass run" from C to A minor, thereby going back to the root. Biographer Marc Spitz describes the riff as "instantly recognisable and primal but complex." While Ronson plays the main riff on an electric guitar, Bowie plays an acoustic twelve-string guitar, which is mixed beneath the electric. A second electric guitar riff, inspired by the American rock band the Byrds, what Doggett calls a "jingle-jangle", is also present but almost buried in the mix. Richard Cromelin of Rolling Stone notes the "faint ring" of 1970's The Man Who Sold the World on the track—"stately, measured, fuzzily electric." Bowie begins his vocals, which Doggett describes "like a meteor from a distant galaxy", with "the phrase that defines his hero: 'Ziggy played guitar'." The song ends with a reprise of the same line, but Bowie holds the note "defiantly"; once his voice slides away, and Ronson enters on guitar, sliding away in the same vein. Doggett describes the final seconds: "Then, after one of the most perfectly judged pauses ever captured on vinyl, there was 'Suffragette City'."

== Lyrics ==
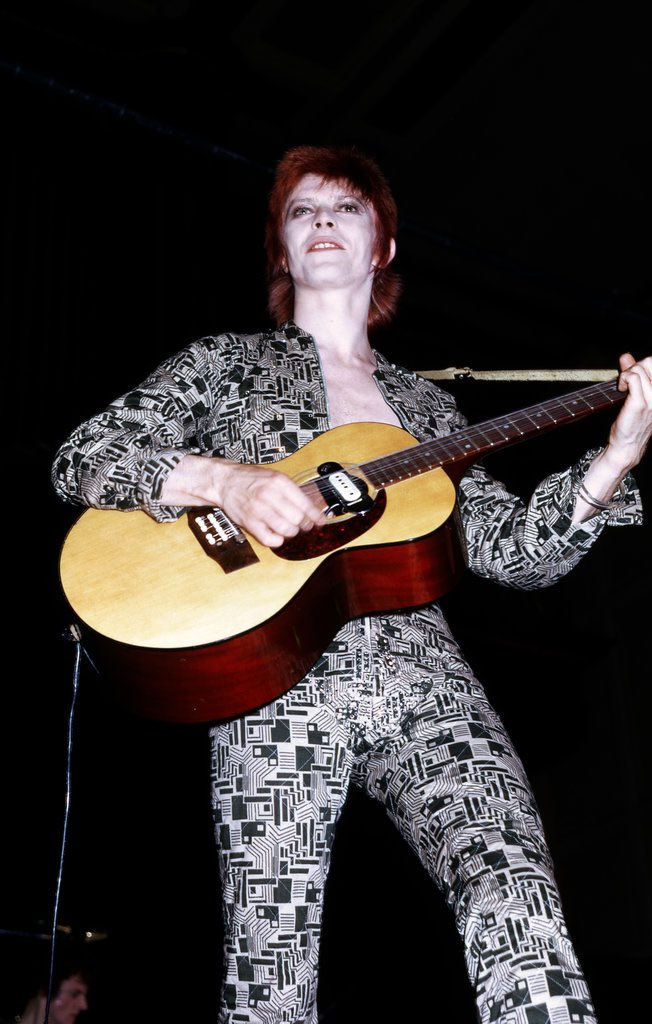
Bowie in character as Ziggy Stardust performing during the Ziggy Stardust Tour.

The song describes Bowie's alter ego Ziggy Stardust, a rock star who acts as a messenger for extraterrestrial beings. The character was inspired by English rock 'n' roll singer Vince Taylor, whom Bowie met after Taylor had a breakdown and believed himself to be a cross between a god and an alien, though Taylor was only part of the character's blueprint. Bowie's allusions to Taylor include identifying himself as a "leper messiah". Other influences included the Legendary Stardust Cowboy and Kansai Yamamoto, who designed the costumes Bowie wore during the tour. Bowie told Rolling Stone that the name "Ziggy" was "one of the few Christian names I could find beginning with the letter 'Z'". He later explained in a 1990 interview for Q magazine that the Ziggy part came from a tailor's shop called Ziggy's that he passed on a train, and he liked it because it had "that Iggy [Pop] connotation but it was a tailor's shop, and I thought, Well, this whole thing is gonna be about clothes, so it was my own little joke calling him Ziggy. So Ziggy Stardust was a real compilation of things."

On the album, the Ziggy Stardust character is introduced directly on the third track, "Moonage Daydream". However, "Ziggy Stardust" is the central piece of the narrative of the album, presenting a complete "birth-to-death chronology". Both "Ziggy Stardust" and fellow album track "Lady Stardust" offer vastly different portraits of Ziggy. According to the author Peter Doggett, "Lady Stardust" presents an unfinished tale with "no hint at a denouement beyond a vague air of melancholy", while "Ziggy Stardust" shows Ziggy's rise and fall in a very human manner. O'Leary notes that the song's narrator is not definitive: it could be an audience member retrospectively discussing Ziggy, it could be one of the Spiders or even the "dissociated memories" of Ziggy himself. Ziggy has several rock star characteristics: drug use, an enormous cock, and the "too-wasted-to-leave-the-room pallor." He plays guitar "left hand", which Doggett and Pegg believe is inspired by American guitarist Jimi Hendrix, along with the lines "jiving us that we were voodoo" and "killed" by "the kids". Ziggy is "well-hung" and has a "snow-white tan", which Pegg believes suggests the "coked-up sexuality of Iggy Pop's stage persona." Pegg also notes the presence of Lou Reed of the Velvet Underground in the line "came on so loaded man". He also describes himself as "the Nazz", which was the American comedian Lord Buckley's nickname for Christ (as in "Nazarene"), as well as the name of several former backing bands for Todd Rundgren and Alice Cooper; Cooper had also fronted a group known as the Spiders in 1965. Doggett notes the similarity between the story of Jesus and Ziggy: the story of Jesus ended in death, and is followed by "a mysterious afterlife, acolytes, skeptics, and all the other paraphernalia associated with the premature demise of modern-day icons", mentioning the likes of Marilyn Monroe, James Dean, Hendrix, Elvis Presley, John Lennon and Kurt Cobain. According to Pegg, the line "making love with his ego" most likely refers to Jim Morrison and Mick Jagger, but believes "the list of applicants is still growing." The line "Ziggy sucked up into his mind" reprises the line "your laughter is sucked in their brains" from the Hunky Dory track "Queen Bitch".

== Release and reception ==
It was quite easy to become obsessed night and day with the character. I became Ziggy Stardust. David Bowie went totally out the window.

— David Bowie, in an interview with Rolling Stone, 1976

"Ziggy Stardust" is the ninth track on the Bowie's fifth studio album The Rise and Fall of Ziggy Stardust and the Spiders from Mars, released on 16 June 1972 by RCA Records. The original recording was never released as a single, but a live version recorded at Santa Monica Civic Auditorium during the Ziggy Stardust Tour was released as a single in France and the United States in 1994 to promote the bootleg album Santa Monica '72 (1994). This version was accompanied by a video compiled from live footage shot at Dunstable Civic Hall on 21 June 1972 which, according to Pegg, offers "fascinating glimpses of an early Ziggy show in action." In the wake of Bowie's death in 2016, the song peaked at number 86 on the Portuguese AFP chart, number 75 on the Billboard Japan Hot 100 and at number 17 on the US Billboard Hot Rock Songs chart.

Since its release, "Ziggy Stardust" has received widespread acclaim from music critics, with the majority praising its story, guitar riff and the band's performance. In a review for Ziggy Stardust on release, Richard Cromelin of Rolling Stone praised Bowie's imagery and storytelling, calling it some of his most "adventuresome" up to that point. Ned Raggett of AllMusic noted the song's restraint compared to other songs on the album: "Rather than being one of the album's quick, stone-cold rockers, it's measured, takes its time, is as acoustic as it is electric." Raggett described the band's performance as "crisp and explosive" praising Ronson's guitar work, believing his riffs and their distortion could "signal ... where rock could go as any of Hendrix's big hits." He also complimented Bowie's vocal performance and called the song a "total classic." Ultimate Classic Rock ranked "Ziggy Stardust" second on their list of the ten best glam rock songs of the 1970s, behind "20th Century Boy" by T. Rex, which was written by Marc Bolan, one of the influencers of Ziggy Stardust. The same publication, on their list of Bowie's ten best songs, listed "Ziggy Stardust" at number six, praising Ronson's guitar hook, writing, "[it] gives the song as much of its personality as Bowie's lyrics do." Ian Fortnam of Classic Rock ranked every track on the album from worst to best placing the song at number four, praising its storytelling, Ronson's guitar work and Bowie's vocal performance. In 2018, NME, on their list of Bowie's 40 greatest songs, ranked "Ziggy Stardust" at number 20, calling Ronson's guitar riff one of rock's greatest. Rolling Stone described the song as "one of rock's earliest, and best, power ballads." In 2010, the song ranked at number 282 on their list of The 500 Greatest Songs of All Time. Ultimate Classic Rock placed the song on their list of the top 200 songs of the 1970s, writing that as the centrepiece of Bowie's "greatest album", "in a way, it's also Bowie's story turbocharged through the cosmos, ready for whatever the decade offered him." The song is one of four of Bowie's songs included on the Rock and Roll Hall of Fame's list of The Songs That Shaped Rock and Roll.

== Live versions and subsequent releases ==
Bowie recorded the song for the BBC radio programmes Sounds of the 70s: John Peel and Bob Harris on 11 and 18 January 1972, respectively. On 16 May 1972, he played the song again on Sounds of the 70s: John Peel, which was broadcast a week later on 23 May 1972. The 18 January and 16 May recordings were released on the Bowie at the Beeb album in 2000, while the 11 January recording is included on the album BBC Sessions 1969–1972 (Sampler).

Bowie performed the song throughout the Ziggy Stardust Tour (1972–1973), and it can be heard on Ziggy Stardust: The Motion Picture (1983) and Live Santa Monica '72 (2008). Performances from the Isolar II Tour have been released on Stage (1978) and Welcome to the Blackout (2018). Despite having vowed in 1990 never to perform the track again, it was often the closing number on Bowie's 2002 Heathen Tour. Buckley calls his renditions during this tour "heart-stopping". A previously unreleased performance from the tour, recorded at the Montreux Jazz Festival on 18 July 2002, was released on the box set I Can't Give Everything Away (2002–2016) in 2025. Bowie also performed the song at the 2000 Glastonbury Festival, released in 2018 on the album Glastonbury 2000, and on his 2003 Reality Tour. A performance from that tour is included on the 2010 A Reality Tour DVD and the album of the same title.

Since its release, "Ziggy Stardust" has appeared on numerous compilation albums, including Changesonebowie (1976), Changesbowie (1990), The Best of David Bowie 1969/1974 (1997), Best of Bowie (2002), Nothing Has Changed (2014) and Legacy (2016). The song, along with the entire Ziggy Stardust album, has been remastered multiple times, including in 1990 by Rykodisc, and in 2012 for its 40th anniversary. The 2012 remaster and a 2003 remix by producer Ken Scott were included in the box set Five Years (1969–1973) in 2015.

== Personnel ==
Personnel per Kevin Cann and Chris O'Leary.

- David Bowie – vocals, twelve-string acoustic guitar, producer
- Mick Ronson – electric guitar, rhythm guitar
- Trevor Bolder – bass guitar
- Mick Woodmansey – drums
- Ken Scott – producer, engineer, mixing

== Charts ==
Chart (1973)	Peak position
Belgium (Ultratop 50 Wallonia) Charted with "The Jean Genie"	7

Chart (2016)	Peak position
France (SNEP)	79
Ireland (IRMA)	79
Japan Hot 100 (Billboard)	75
Portugal (AFP)	86
Sweden (Sverigetopplistan)	86
UK Singles (OCC)	76
US Hot Rock & Alternative Songs (Billboard)	17

== Certifications ==
Region	Certification	Certified units/sales
New Zealand (RMNZ)	Platinum	30,000^{‡}
United Kingdom (BPI)	Gold	400,000^{‡}
^{‡} Sales+streaming figures based on certification alone.

== Bauhaus version ==
"Ziggy Stardust"

Single by Bauhaus
- B-side: "Third Uncle" (Eno)
- Released: 1 October 1982
- Recorded: 1982 at a BBC radio session
- Genre: Gothic rock; post-punk
- Length: 3:08
- Label: Beggars Banquet
- Songwriter: David Bowie

Bauhaus singles chronology
"Spirit" (1982)	"Ziggy Stardust" (1982)	"Lagartija Nick" (1983)

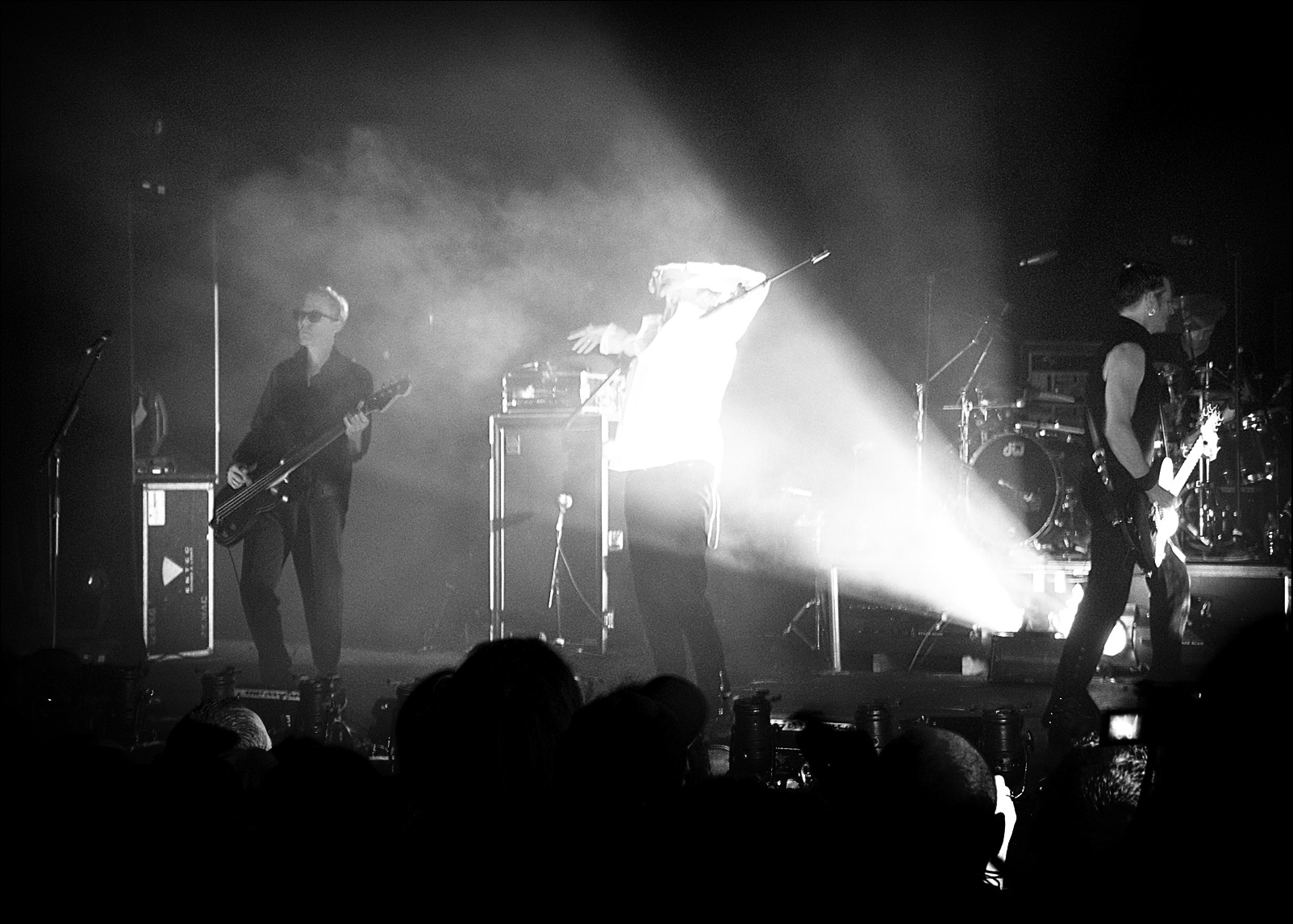
Bauhaus performing in London in 2006.

The English gothic rock band Bauhaus recorded a version of "Ziggy Stardust" as their eighth single. The song was chosen by the band in response to critics who had accused them of copying Bowie's sound. Daniel Ash explained: "[W]e thought we'd do the opposite of what they'd expect and promptly release 'Ziggy'."

According to AllMusic's Dave Thompson, the band were "killing some downtime" at Trident Studios in London when members Haskins and Ash began an impromptu jam of "Ziggy Stardust" as a "joking tribute" to "the artist with whom virtually every critic in the land had now compared Bauhaus." Tapes were running and once they heard the track, they were "absolutely enthralled" and decided to include it during their upcoming BBC session for John Peel. Bauhaus subsequently recorded their version of "Ziggy Stardust" at a session in 1982. Their version has been categorised as gothic rock and post-punk. The group filmed a music video for their cover in August 1982 at the Roundhouse under Camden Market in London. Directed by Mick Calvert, it features the band performing a full "mock-gig" with complete backline and "riotous" fans. Ned Raggett of AllMusic praised Bauhaus' rendition of "Ziggy Stardust", calling it a "nuclear-strength take" on the original.

Bauhaus' version was released as a single in October 1982 by Beggars Banquet Records in 7" and 12" format (as BEG 83 and BEG 83T, respectively). The B-side was a cover of English musician Brian Eno's "Third Uncle", from his 1974 album Taking Tiger Mountain (By Strategy), which was recorded at the same radio session as "Ziggy Stardust". The 12" single featured an original, "Party of the First Part", and a live cover of the 1967 Velvet Underground song "I'm Waiting for the Man". The single peaked at number 15 on the UK Singles Chart, earning the band an appearance on the television programme Top of the Pops. The single's success propelled their 1982 album The Sky's Gone Out to number four on the UK Albums Chart, becoming the band's biggest hit. This recording later appeared on the group's 1989 album Swing the Heartache: The BBC Sessions. Another studio take, featuring elements of Bowie's 1973 song "Cracked Actor", was released on the 2009 reissue of their 1981 album Mask.

=== Track listings ===
7" single

1. "Ziggy Stardust" (Bowie) – 3:08
2. "Third Uncle" (Eno) – 5:11

12" single

1. "Ziggy Stardust" (Bowie) – 3:08
2. "Party of the First Part" (Bauhaus) – 5:22
3. "Third Uncle" (Eno) – 5:11
4. "Waiting for the Man" (live) (Lou Reed) – 5:31

=== Charts ===
Chart (1982)	Peak position
UK Singles (Official Charts Company)	15
