= BBC Sessions 1969–1972 (Sampler) =

Compilation album by David Bowie
- Released: 1996
- Recorded: 1969–1972
- Studio: BBC Radio
- Genre: Rock
- Length: 22:16
- Label: NMC Music
- Producer: Various

David Bowie chronology
| Outside (1995) | BBC Sessions 1969–1972 (Sampler) (1996) | Earthling (1997) |

BBC Sessions 1969–1972 (Sampler) is a compilation album by David Bowie, released in 1996. This release is notable for the inclusion of "I'm Waiting for the Man" in a different BBC session take to the version released on Bowie at the Beeb. (Note: Bowie at the Beeb tracks listing notes confirm this version was recorded on a different date.)

== Track listing ==
All songs written by David Bowie except "Waiting For the Man" by Lou Reed.

1. "Hang on to Yourself" – 2:50
2. "Ziggy Stardust" – 3:19
3. "Space Oddity" – 4:15
4. "Andy Warhol" – 2:53
5. "Waiting For the Man" – 4:50
6. "Interview With Brian Matthew" – 1:27
7. "Let Me Sleep Beside You" – 2:42
