= John, I'm Only Dancing =

Song by David Bowie

Single by David Bowie
- B-side: "Hang On to Yourself"
- Released: 1 September 1972 (original version); April 1973 (sax version)
- Recorded: 26 June 1972 (original); 20 January 1973 (sax version)
- Studio: Olympic, London (original); Trident, London (sax version)
- Genre: Glam rock; R&B
- Length: 2:49 (original); 2:43 (sax version)
- Label: RCA
- Songwriter: David Bowie
- Producers: David Bowie; Ken Scott

David Bowie singles chronology
"Starman" (1972)	"John, I'm Only Dancing" (1972)	"The Jean Genie" (1972)

Music video
- "John, I'm Only Dancing" (Official Video) on YouTube

"John, I'm Only Dancing" is a song by the English musician David Bowie, originally released as a non-album single on 1 September 1972. It is a glam rock and R&B song with lyrics that describe a situation in which the narrator informs his lover not to worry about the girl he is with because he is "only dancing" with her. Although ambiguous, many commentators interpreted it as concerning a gay relationship. Recorded in London in June 1972, it was promoted with a low-budget promotional video directed by Mick Rock. It reached number 12 in the UK; RCA refused to release it in America due to its suggestive lyrical content.

Bowie rerecorded the song, featuring a new arrangement with saxophone, in January 1973 for possible inclusion on Aladdin Sane. RCA issued this recording as a single in April 1973 with the same song title, catalogue number, and B-side as the original. During the 1974 sessions for Young Americans, Bowie re-worked the song into a funk and disco-influenced track, updating the lyrics and instrumentation. Titled "John, I'm Only Dancing (Again)", the new version was a mainstay during the late 1974 Soul tour. Passed over for inclusion on Young Americans, the reworking remained unreleased until RCA issued it as a single in 1979 at the height of disco's popularity. Like the original, it charted at number 12 in the UK.

== Composition ==
=== Music ===
Similar to David Bowie's other compositions of the time, "John, I'm Only Dancing" is a glam rock song performed in an R&B style. It features a simple verse—refrain—verse—extended refrain song structure with a key of G major. The song utilises several elements from other tracks: the opening guitar chords were based on a 1963 recording of "Pontiac Blues" by Sonny Boy Williamson and the Yardbirds; the guitar riff was taken from the saxophone intro of Alvin Cash's "Keep On Dancing" (1968); and the final G chord stemmed from the Yardbirds' "Shapes of Things" (1966).

Comparing the recording to Bowie's recently released The Rise and Fall of Ziggy Stardust and the Spiders from Mars album, the biographer Chris O'Leary notes that the backing band, the Spiders from Mars, are "more dynamic" on "John, I'm Only Dancing" than Ziggy Stardust, arguing its sound foreshadowed the hard rock style of "The Jean Genie" (1972). The writer Ian Rankin of Black and Blue said Mick Ronson's guitar sounded "like sawing through metal". Ronson ended the refrains with "siren wails" and utilised short "feedback bursts" to close his solo. The drummer Woody Woodmansey used mallets instead of drum sticks to get the "hollow"-sounding beats Bowie desired and also overdubbed a few tom-tom fills. For his bassline, Trevor Bolder employed a progression up the E minor scale in the refrains followed by, in O'Leary's words, "an aneurysm of octave root notes".

=== Lyrics ===
Allegedly inspired by a 1970 incident between Bowie, his then-wife Angie and his former drummer John Cambridge, "John, I'm Only Dancing" describes a situation in which the narrator informs his lover not to worry about the girl he is with because he is "only dancing" with her. Although ambiguous and open to individual interpretations, commentators have viewed the song as concerning a gay relationship. Having 'outed' himself as bisexual in an interview with Melody Maker in January 1972, Bowie was adamant about joining the gay culture and claimed in 1993 that "John, I'm Only Dancing" was his "attempt to do a bisexual anthem". He later said:

Gay clubs really became my lifestyle and all my friends were gay. I really opted to drown in the euphoria of this new experience which was a real taboo with society. And I must admit I loved that aspect of it.

Despite being among Bowie's "most gay-indentified [sic] songs", O'Leary argues that "there's not much in it to justify the claim", comparing it to his other songs "Queen Bitch" (1971) and "Suffragette City" (1972), tracks that involve another man in a "vaguely-defined" relationship with another person. The biographer Nicholas Pegg asserts that while the hook ("John, I'm only dancing / She turns me on / But I'm only dancing") has long been considered a gay tease, the song's narrator "could just as easily be a straight man reassuring the girl's lover".

== Recording and release history ==
=== Original version ===
Bowie and the Spiders initially attempted "John, I'm Only Dancing" at London's Trident Studios on 24 June 1972, along with a version of the Who's "I Can't Explain" (1964). (Note: Bowie later covered "I Can't Explain" properly in mid-1973 for his covers album Pin Ups.) The session was produced by Bowie, with assistance from Trident recording engineer Ted Sharp. The recording remained unreleased until 2024, when one take of each song, as mixed in 2021, was included in the box set Rock 'n' Roll Star!

Returning to the song two days later on 26 June at London's Olympic Studios, the session was again produced by Bowie himself, this time with assistance from engineer Keith Harwood. Recording nine takes, the Spiders were joined by the violinist Lindsay Scott, a member of the JSD Band and regular supporting act during the Ziggy Stardust Tour, who copied Ronson's guitar solo note-for-note; (Note: O'Leary states the violin in not audible in the single mix.) Scott went uncredited until the 2002 reissue of Ziggy Stardust. Handclaps were contributed by members of the Faces who had just arrived to the studio; these were recorded in the studio's entrance hall to capture an echo effect Bowie desired.

"John, I'm Only Dancing" was Bowie's first promotional video, directed by the photographer Mick Rock. Shot in two and a half hours at London's Rainbow Theatre on 25 August 1972 on a budget of £200, the video featured side-lit shots of Bowie and the Spiders interspersed with footage of androgynous dancers from Lindsay Kemp's mime troupe, filmed a week earlier. O'Leary comments that the band looks "as if they've stepped out of Kenneth Anger's Scorpio Rising". The anchor motif on Bowie's cheekbone was inspired by the television series Bewitched. Of the video, his manager Tony Defries said: "It's a bit ethereal, not a straightforward band doing their numbers. It's as if it were a work of art." The video was not screened on the BBC's Top of the Pops, possibly because the programme viewed it as too risqué, declined Defries' asking fee of £250, or felt the video itself was subpar. The biographer David Buckley notes that Bowie's miming is poorly synched, due to the faulty record player used for filming. The BBC aired a film of tough-looking motorcycle riders in its place, which Pegg states "inadvertently ended up looking ten times more camp". (Note: This biker clip was later included in a 1992 BBC compilation titled Gay Rock'n'Roll Years, which was intended to establish the evolution of broadcasting attitudes over the decades.)

The follow-up single to "Starman", "John, I'm Only Dancing" was released as a single in the UK and Europe on 1 September 1972, backed by the Ziggy Stardust track "Hang On to Yourself". RCA Records refused to release the single in America due to its suggestive lyrical content, so the song did not appear in the country officially until it was issued on the Changesonebowie compilation in 1976; Bowie wrote "The Jean Genie" as a replacement single. A commercial success, "John, I'm Only Dancing" reached number 12 on the UK Singles Chart by mid-October, and also charted at number 19 on the Irish Singles Chart and number 49 on the Belgian Ultratop 50 in Wallonia.

=== Sax version ===
Bowie was unsatisfied with the original recording and rerecorded it several times. While on tour in America, a not-intended-for-release version was recorded on 7 October 1972 at RCA Studios in Chicago, Illinois. This version, recorded in tandem with Lou Reed's "Vicious", possibly featured Reed on rhythm guitar. A third take was recorded back at Trident on 20 January 1973 during the sessions for the upcoming Aladdin Sane album. Originally intended as the album closer, it was replaced at the last minute by "Lady Grinning Soul". For this version, Bowie added a saxophone section comprising Brian Wilshaw and Ken Fordham. The pianist Matthew Fisher, a studio visitor at the time, recalled in 1992 that "instead of describing the type of sound he wanted from [the saxophonists] in a musical way, David talked about it in terms of colours." He also informed them to think "renaissance" and "impressionist". He made further changes to the arrangement. According to O'Leary, Bowie "reduced the gawkiness" of his original vocal, such as the "touch me!'s" in the coda and spoken-word "ever cared", but "kept the phrasing in which he sang a tone above the bassline". AllMusic's Dave Thompson described this take as "punchier" than the original.

Following its replacement on Aladdin Sane, this often-called "sax version" was released as a single in April 1973 with little fanfare, packaged with the same catalogue number and B-side as the original single and no indication it was a different recording.

== Legacy ==
"John, I'm Only Dancing" was added to Bowie's Ziggy Stardust Tour live set in July 1972 and dropped by the 1973 Japanese leg. A previously unreleased live version from Boston Music Hall, recorded on 1 October 1972, was released in 1989 on the original Sound + Vision box set, but was not included in subsequent versions of the compilation. The same track, however, was issued on the bonus disc of the 2003 Aladdin Sane reissue. Another live version, recorded at Santa Monica Civic Auditorium on 20 October 1972, has been released on the bootleg Santa Monica '72 (1994) and that album's official release Live Santa Monica '72 (2008). The song later made appearances on Bowie's Sound+Vision Tour in 1990, before he retired it for good.

The 1973 sax reworking appeared on the first 1,000 copies of Changesonebowie in 1976 before it was replaced with the original version, as Bowie wanted the original included on the compilation. In 1979, a remix of the original 1972 track, which condensed the echo on Bowie's vocal and pushed it higher in the mix, was placed as the B-side of "John, I'm Only Dancing (Again)". (Note: According to O'Leary, the original single's mix can be identified by the opening acoustic guitar chord, which is solely in the left channel and across both channels in the remix.)

In subsequent decades, the 1972 and 1973 recordings have both appeared on Bowie compilations. The original version appeared on compilations including Changesbowie (1990) and The Singles 1969–1993 (1993), while its 1979 remix was a bonus track on the 1990 Rykodisc CD release of Ziggy Stardust. The sax version appeared on compilations including Sound + Vision (1989) and The Best of David Bowie 1969/1974 (1997) and on the bonus disc of the 2003 reissue of Aladdin Sane. Additionally, both versions were included on Re:Call 1, part of the Five Years (1969–1973) boxed set, in 2015.

Several commentators have viewed the sax reworking as superior to the original cut. The author Peter Doggett states that although the sax version sacrifices two "thrilling aspects" of the original, including the "percussive arrival" and "marching brass", he argues it is "more satisfying", writing: "If the guitar crescendo of the first recording hinted at orgasm, the second took it all the way." The original track has appeared on lists of Bowie's greatest songs by Uncut (14), The Guardian (30), NME (30) and Mojo (52). Rolling Stone named the original one of the 30 most essential songs of Bowie's catalogue following his death in January 2016. The same month, Ultimate Classic Rock placed the single at number 24 in a list ranking every Bowie single from worst to best in 2016. Two years later, NME readers voted it Bowie's 15th best track.

In 1981, the UK rockabilly revival band the Polecats had a minor hit with a cover of "John, I'm Only Dancing", charting at number 35 on the UK Singles Chart. Another version by the UK post-punk band the Chameleons appeared as a bonus track on the CD release of their 1986 album Strange Times. AllMusic's Ned Raggett described this version as "a quick fun goof".

== Personnel ==
According to Chris O'Leary:

Original version

- David Bowie – lead vocal, 12-string acoustic guitar
- Mick Ronson – lead guitar
- Trevor Bolder – bass guitar
- Mick Woodmansey – drums
- Lindsay Scott – violin
- Ian McLagan, Ron Wood, Ronnie Lane, or Kenney Jones – handclaps

Technical

- David Bowie – producer
- Keith Harwood – engineer

Sax version

- David Bowie – lead vocal, 12-string acoustic guitar, saxophone
- Mick Ronson – lead guitar
- Mike Garson – piano
- Trevor Bolder – bass guitar
- Mick Woodmansey – drums, tambourine
- Brian Wilshaw – tenor and baritone saxophone
- Ken Fordham – tenor and baritone saxophone

Technical

- Ken Scott – producer, engineer
- David Bowie – producer

== John, I'm Only Dancing (Again) ==
"John, I'm Only Dancing (Again)"
- US 12" single

Single by David Bowie
- B-side: "John, I'm Only Dancing (remix)"
- Released: 7 December 1979
- Recorded: August and November 1974
- Studio: Sigma Sound, Philadelphia
- Genre: Funk; disco
- Length: 6:57 (12" version); 3:26 (single version)
- Label: RCA
- Songwriter: David Bowie
- Producer: Tony Visconti

David Bowie singles chronology
"Look Back in Anger" (1979)	"John, I'm Only Dancing (Again)" (1979)	"Alabama Song" (1980)

In 1974, Bowie abandoned glam rock for soul music. Wanting a soul and disco hit for the American market, he decided to revise "John, I'm Only Dancing" in the fashion. For the reworking, he retained the original song's key and refrain but wrote entirely new verses and backing instrumentation. Bearing little resemblance to the original, the revision, tentatively titled "Dancin'", employed a funk-based James Brown groove, was more risqué than the original ("It's got you reelin' and rockin', won't you let me slam my thang in?"), and had five verses with Bowie, in O'Leary's words, "as wedding party MC", making occasional jokes and giving hints as to his deteriorating mental state ("got a line on my hand and Charlie on my back") and America's current position ("president has got the blues"). Ronson's original guitar riff was also split between Mike Garson on Fender Rhodes and Carlos Alomar's phasing lead, with synthesiser overdubs later. Bowie later used the chord structure as the basis for the Station to Station track "Stay", recorded in late 1975.

Recorded at Sigma Sound Studios in Philadelphia, Pennsylvania, the almost seven-minute track evolved from a two-hour Young Americans jam session in August 1974. With Tony Visconti producing and Carl Paruolo engineering, the lineup consisted of Bowie, Alomar on guitar, Willie Weeks on bass, Garson on piano and clavinet, Andy Newmark on drums, David Sanborn on alto saxophone, Larry Washington on conga and Pablo Rosario on chimes and cowbell. Singer Ava Cherry, Alomar's wife Robin Clark, then-unknown singer Luther Vandross, Diane Sumler and Anthony Hinton contributed backing vocals.

Now titled "John, I'm Only Dancing (Again)", the revamp was added to Bowie's live set during the opening night of the Soul tour in Los Angeles; Bowie introduced it as "something to dance to, anyway. It's an old song". A snippet of this first performance was captured in Alan Yentob's Cracked Actor documentary. It remained in Soul tour setlists until Bowie returned to Sigma Sound in November 1974, when further work was carried out. A performance from September 1974 was later released on Cracked Actor (Live Los Angeles '74) in 2017, while another from October saw release on I'm Only Dancing (The Soul Tour 74) in 2020.

Initially set for release on Young Americans, "John, I'm Only Dancing (Again)" was replaced by "Fame" at the last minute, so Bowie shelved it indefinitely. On 7 December 1979, at the height of disco's popularity, RCA belatedly issued the track as a stand-alone single (as RCA BOW 4), backed by the 1979 remix of the original 1972 track. It appeared in both 12" and edited 7" formats; both versions were on one single in Britain, but were spread across two in America. It reached number 12 in the UK, the same position as the 1972 original, and number 29 in Ireland.

The 12" version has appeared on the compilations Changestwobowie (1981) and The Best of David Bowie 1974/1979 (1998), and also as a bonus track on the 1991 and 2007 reissues of Young Americans. The 7" single version was released on Rare in 1982, but was not released on CD until the box set Who Can I Be Now? (1974–1976) in 2016. Although Pegg compliments Bowie's vocal as one of his "most accomplished soul vocals", O'Leary disregards "John, I'm Only Dancing (Again)" as "a desperate white British burlesque of American black music". In Ultimate Classic Rock's 2016 list ranking every Bowie single from worst to best, the publication placed the track at number 86.

=== Personnel ===
According to O'Leary:

- David Bowie – lead vocal
- Carlos Alomar – guitar
- Willie Weeks – bass
- Mike Garson – Fender Rhodes, clavinet
- Andy Newmark – drums
- David Sanborn – alto saxophone
- Larry Washington – conga
- Pablo Rosario – chimes, cowbell
- Ava Cherry – backing vocals
- Robin Clark – backing vocals
- Luther Vandross – backing vocals
- Diane Sumler – backing vocals
- Anthony Hinton – backing vocals

Technical

- Tony Visconti – producer
- Carl Paruolo – engineer

== Charts ==
Chart performance for "John, I'm Only Dancing"
Chart (1972)	Peak position
Belgium Wallonia (Ultratop 50)	49
Ireland (IRMA)	19
UK Singles Chart	12

Chart performance for "John, I'm Only Dancing (Again)"
Chart (1979)	Peak position
Ireland (IRMA)	29
UK Singles Chart	12

== Cover versions ==
British rockabilly band The Polecats had their first, and joint-biggest, UK hit single with their version, reaching number 35 in the UK singles charts in early 1981.
