= John Henshall =

John Henshall may refer to:

- John Henshall (footballer), footballer for Burslem Port Vale
- John Henshall (photographer) (born 1942), British photographer, cinematographer, and writer
- John Henry Henshall (1856–1928), British watercolourist and etcher
