= Santa Monica '72 =

1994 live album by David Bowie

Live album by David Bowie
- Released: 25 April 1994 (UK); 28 March 1995 (US)
- Recorded: 20 October 1972
- Genre: Glam rock
- Length: 76:29
- Labels: Golden Years (UK); Griffin Music (US)

David Bowie chronology
The Singles Collection (1993)	Santa Monica '72 (1994)	Rarestonebowie (1995)

David Bowie live albums chronology
Ziggy Stardust: The Motion Picture (1983)	Santa Monica '72 (1994)	LiveAndWell.com (1999)

Alternative cover
- Griffin Limited Edition box set

Alternative cover
- Griffin Wooden box release

Professional ratings
Review scores
Source	Rating
AllMusic	4.5/5 stars
Select	5/5 medals

Santa Monica '72 is a live album by David Bowie, recorded at Santa Monica Civic Auditorium on 20 October 1972 during the Ziggy Stardust Tour. Taken from KMET FM's radio broadcast, it was available only as a bootleg for more than 20 years; according to author David Buckley, possessing a copy was the test of a "proper Bowie fan". The recording was issued semi-legally/officially and without Bowie's approval by the Golden Years label in 1994, with Griffin Music handling the American release in 1995.

== Songs ==
This live album features a quite different setlist to the one found on Ziggy Stardust – The Motion Picture (1983) (namely that, with the exception of "The Jean Genie", the setlist contains no songs from Aladdin Sane, which were very present by the end of the tour), which was recorded nine months afterwards and similarly bootlegged prior to its belated official release. The Santa Monica recording is generally considered a superior representation of the Ziggy Stardust concerts in terms of both sound quality and standard of playing. In 1981, NME critics Roy Carr and Charles Shaar Murray called it not simply "the performer's best ever bootleg", but "far superior to either of Bowie's official location recordings" to that date, David Live (1974) and Stage (1978).

A gold disc edition with the DJ's closing remarks at the end was made available in the Netherlands, while in the US a special limited box set was released that included a T-shirt, a key chain and a short video. The video was not actually from the Santa Monica show, but was previously unseen footage from a silent colour film made at a concert in Dunstable, England on 21 June 1972. The video was combined with the live audio recording from the Santa Monica concert. This box was limited to only 1000 copies. In addition, an even more limited edition was released as a small wooden box with Bowie's image carved into the lid, and a brass plate indicating the series number. Only 250 copies were made.

This semi-legal release was one in the series of mid-nineties releases by MainMan, Bowie's former management company during the seventies (other ones being Rarestonebowie and the Ava Cherry & The Astronettes album People from Bad Homes). All these albums were released without Bowie's approval and are currently out of print.

An official version – Live Santa Monica '72 – was issued by EMI/Virgin in 2008.

== Track listing ==
All songs written by David Bowie except as noted.

1. "Intro" – 0:15
2. "Hang on to Yourself" – 2:47
3. "Ziggy Stardust" – 3:24
4. "Changes" – 3:32
5. "The Supermen" – 2:57
6. "Life on Mars?" – 3:28
7. "Five Years" – 5:21
8. "Space Oddity" – 5:22
9. "Andy Warhol" – 3:58
10. "My Death" (Eric Blau, Jacques Brel, Mort Shuman) – 5:56
11. "The Width of a Circle" – 10:39
12. "Queen Bitch" – 3:01
13. "Moonage Daydream" – 4:38
14. "John, I'm Only Dancing" – 3:36
15. "I'm Waiting for the Man" (Lou Reed) – 6:01
16. "The Jean Genie" – 4:02
17. "Suffragette City" – 4:25
18. "Rock 'n' Roll Suicide" – 3:17

== Personnel ==
- David Bowie – guitar, vocals
- Mick Ronson – guitar, vocals
- Trevor Bolder – bass
- Mick "Woody" Woodmansey – drums
- Mike Garson – piano

== Other releases ==
- In Belgium the album was released with the DJ's closing remarks as Ziggy Stardust and the Spiders from Mars "Live" in 1995.
- In Japan the album was released without the intro or the outro as Live 1972 in 1997.
- This performance of The Velvet Underground's "Waiting for the Man" was featured in the film Almost Famous (2000), as well as included on the soundtrack album.

== Chart performance ==
In the United Kingdom, Santa Monica '72 peaked at #74 on the UK Albums Chart during 1994.
