= Ziggy Stardust Tour =

1972–1973 concert tour by David Bowie

- Tour by David Bowie
- Poster with the June 1972 tour dates
- Location: United Kingdom; North America; Asia
- Associated albums: Hunky Dory; The Rise and Fall of Ziggy Stardust and the Spiders from Mars; Aladdin Sane
- Start date: 29 January 1972
- End date: 3 July 1973
- Legs: 6
- No. of shows: 191 (196 scheduled)

David Bowie concert chronology
- —; Ziggy Stardust Tour (1972–1973); Diamond Dogs Tour (1974)

The Ziggy Stardust Tour was a 1972–1973 concert tour by the English singer-songwriter David Bowie, to promote the studio albums Hunky Dory, The Rise and Fall of Ziggy Stardust and the Spiders from Mars and Aladdin Sane. Bowie was accompanied by his backing group, the Spiders from Mars, and integrated choreography, costumes and make-up into the live shows to make them a wider entertainment package. The tour generated significant press coverage, drawing positive reviews and launching Bowie to stardom.

The tour covered the UK, the US and Japan. It moved from small pub and club gigs at the beginning, to highly publicised sold-out shows at the end. At the tour's last gig at the Hammersmith Odeon, London, on 3 July 1973, Bowie shocked fans by announcing that it was the last show he would do with the Spiders from Mars.

== Itinerary ==
The tour lasted a year and a half and included three legs in the UK, two in the US and one in Japan.

=== 1972 ===
The first show was on 29 January 1972 at the Borough Assembly Hall, Aylesbury, England, and featured Bowie with his backing group the Spiders from Mars: guitarist Mick Ronson, bassist Trevor Bolder and drummer Mick Woodmansey. Audio engineer Robin Mayhew had started working on the PA and sound equipment since the end of the previous year, and was the principal sound engineer for the entire tour.

Unlike typical rock concerts at the time, the shows featured a theatrical element with a rough storyline, and several make-up and costume changes. Bowie wanted the shows to be entertainment and to be outrageous, which the Beatles and the Rolling Stones had been at one time, and collaborated with mime artist Lindsay Kemp with the on-stage choreography. Looking for a change of image, Bowie asked local hairdresser Suzi Fussey to cut his long blond hair, later dyeing it red. Some group members were unsure about the stage clothes Bowie asked them to wear, but quickly changed their minds after they realised the attention it gave them with female fans.

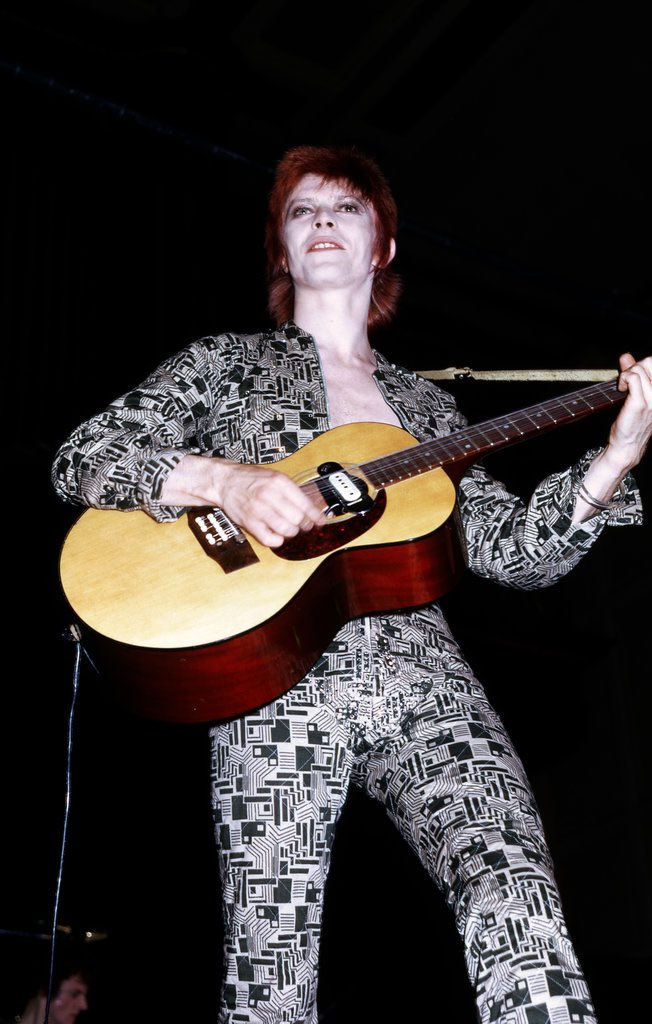
David Bowie as Ziggy Stardust performing in Newcastle

The second show was at the Toby Jug pub in Tolworth on 10 February, where Bowie unveiled his "Ziggy Stardust" persona for the first time in front of an audience of around 60. Early shows had a similar attendance, but this increased as the tour progressed. The 21 April show at the Manchester Free Trade Hall was only attended by a few hundred people, but at the end of the show, Bowie was carried out into the audience by fans. At the 17 June show at Oxford Town Hall, Bowie simulated fellatio on Ronson's guitar. The scene was photographed by Mick Rock and was published on the front cover of Melody Maker, greatly raising Bowie's profile in the UK. On 25 June at the Greyhound, Croydon, Bowie was supported by Roxy Music and Trapeze.

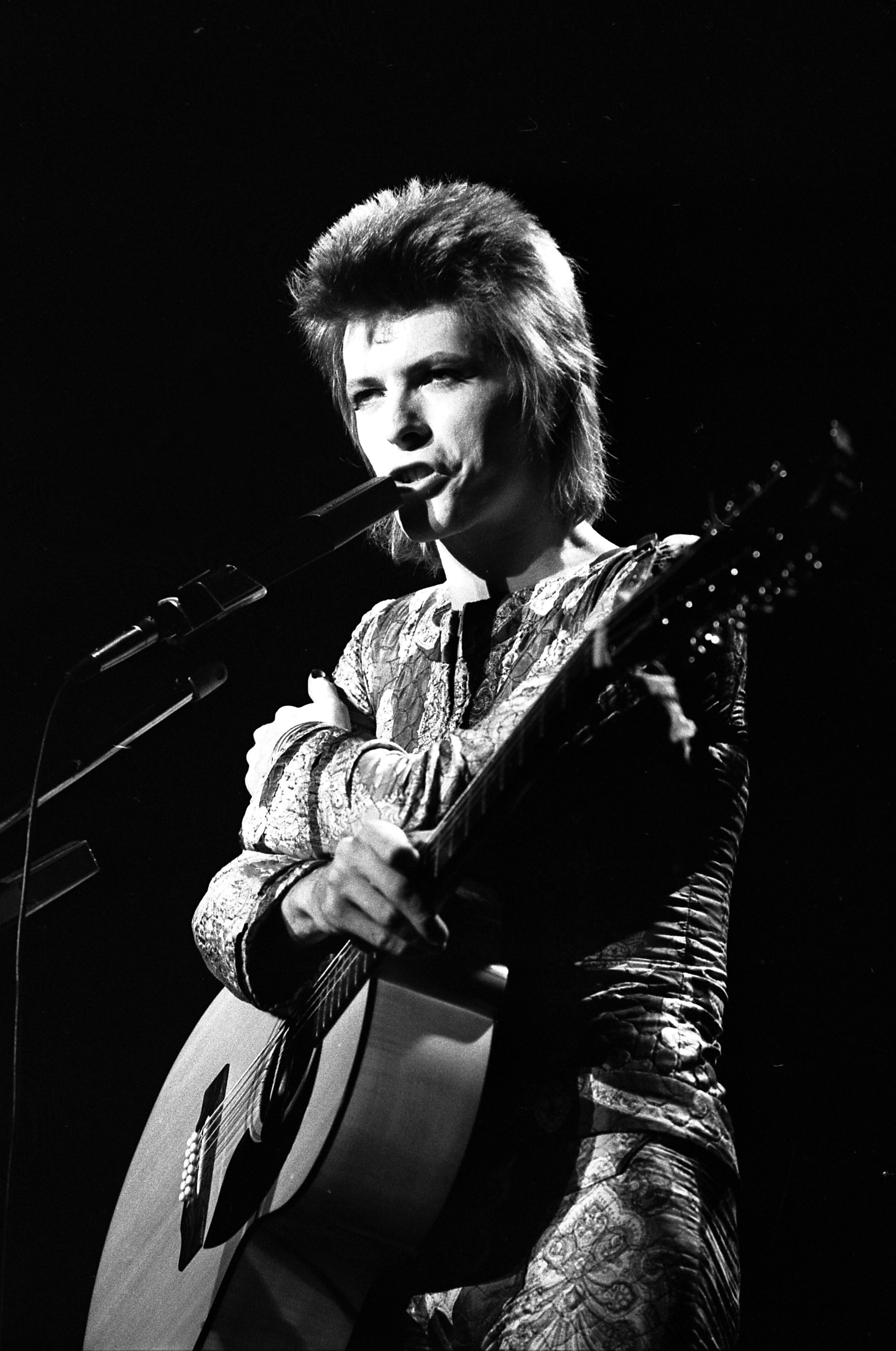
David Bowie, as Ziggy Stardust, performing at the Santa Monica Civic Auditorium on 20 October 1972

The 15 July show at the Friars Aylesbury included several US music journalists in the audience, including Dave Marsh and Lillian Roxon. Bowie's management spent $25,000 (about $192,000 in today's dollars) to fly them, along with US representatives of their record label RCA Records, to preview his live work before starting a major US tour that autumn.

After several months on the road, Bowie took a break to revisit and re-rehearse the live show, to include greater theatrics and costume changes. Rehearsals took place at the Stratford Royal Theatre. The first concert after this was at the Rainbow Theatre, London, on 19 August, where Bowie was simply billed as "Ziggy Stardust". A second show was added for the following day after the first one sold out. Pianist Nicky Graham was added to the band line-up for these shows.

The first leg in the US began in September 1972. Bowie travelled there by boat as he did not like flying. Bowie and the Spiders from Mars played their first US show in the Cleveland Music Hall on 22 September. It was also pianist Mike Garson's debut. Six days later, Bowie played a sold-out show at Carnegie Hall. The concerts drew rave reviews from the press and led to the tour being extended for a further two months. A concert on 20 October at the Santa Monica Civic Auditorium was broadcast on radio, and heavily bootlegged before finally being released semi-officially in 1994 as Santa Monica '72 and officially in 2008 as Live Santa Monica '72. The press coverage of the tour turned Bowie into a star in the US and he was featured on the front cover of Rolling Stone.

The year ended with a short UK leg, which carried over into the start of 1973. Bowie played two shows at the Rainbow just before Christmas, and asked the audience to bring toys along to the concert that could be redistributed to children. The mid-show acoustic set that had been part of all the gigs until then was discarded, and Bowie with the Spiders played just an electric set.

=== 1973 ===
At the start of 1973, Bowie called his friend Geoffrey MacCormack, saying he wanted to expand the musical line-up on stage, and asked if he would be a backing vocalist and travel with him. Another friend, John Hutchinson was recruited as an additional rhythm guitarist; the pair had previously collaborated on the demo of "Space Oddity".

The second US leg began in early 1973 with a sell-out show at the Radio City Music Hall, New York, on 14 February, which saw fans queuing at 2:30 pm for an evening show. Bowie's costumes were designed by Kansai Yamamoto. During the end of set, he collapsed and had to be assisted. The tour subsequently moved to Japan. Bowie then travelled by ferry across the Sea of Japan to Vladivostok, and travelled on the Trans-Siberian Railway to Moscow in order to get back to Britain. During this time, the Spiders from Mars complained they were still on the same wages as when they had started playing with Bowie despite multiple sold-out shows. They re-negotiated their fees with Bowie's manager Tony Defries, but this caused a rift in the band.

The final leg of the tour covered the UK and began on 12 May 1973 with a concert at Earls Court Exhibition Centre in front of an audience of 18,000. Police forced the show to stop for 15 minutes while they battled with fans trying to storm the stage. Mick and Bianca Jagger attended the show. The concert was fraught with technical difficulties and an inadequate PA system, leading to disgruntled fans.

The last performance at the Hammersmith Odeon on 3 July was filmed by D. A. Pennebaker. Woodmansey recalled the show was one of the best the band had played, because it was close to their London base and almost the end of an exhausting tour. Towards the end of the show, Bowie announced "not only is it the last show of the tour, but it's the last show that we'll ever do". Ronson had been told in advance by Bowie that the Spiders from Mars would split, but the announcement took Bolder and Woodmansey by surprise.

== Aftermath ==
By the end of the final leg, Bowie had grown weary of playing Ziggy Stardust, saying "I had an awful lot of fun doing [Ziggy] ... but my performance on stage reached a peak. I felt I couldn't go on stage in the same context again ... if I'm tired with what I'm doing wouldn't it be long before the audience realised." Bowie went to France to record his covers album Pin Ups in the second half of 1973, and then his album Diamond Dogs in early 1974. Bowie's next tour, a solo tour without the Spiders, was his Diamond Dogs Tour of 1974.

== Personnel ==
According to biographer Nicholas Pegg:

- David Bowie (Ziggy Stardust) – vocals, guitar, harmonica

The Spiders from Mars

- Mick Ronson – guitar, vocals
- Trevor Bolder – bass
- Mick "Woody" Woodmansey – drums

Other musicians

- Robin Lumley – piano (June – July 1972)
- Nicky Graham – piano (19 August – 7 September 1972)
- Mike Garson – piano, keyboards (September 1972 – end of tour)

Other musicians on the 1973 legs

- John Hutchinson – rhythm guitar, 12-string acoustic guitar
- Warren Peace – backing vocals, percussion
- Ken Fordham – saxophone
- Brian Wilshaw – saxophone, flute

== Tour dates ==
According to Kevin Cann:

=== 1972 ===
List of tour dates with date, city, country and venue
Date	City	Country	Venue
Europe
29 January	Aylesbury	England	Borough Assembly Hall
10 February	London	England	Tolworth, Toby Jug
11 February	Wycombe	England	Wycombe Town Hall
12 February	London	England	Imperial College London
14 February	Brighton	England	Brighton Dome
18 February	Sheffield	England	University Rag
23 February	Chichester	England	Chichester College
24 February	London	England	Wallington, Public Hall
25 February	London	England	Eltham, Avery Hill College
26 February	Sutton Coldfield	England	Belfry Hotel
~~28 February~~ (cancelled)	Glasgow	Scotland	Glasgow City Halls
29 February	Sunderland	England	Locarno Ballroom
1 March	Bristol	England	Bristol University
4 March	Portsmouth	England	South Parade Pier, Southsea
7 March	Yeovil	England	Yeovil College
11 March	Southampton	England	Southampton Guildhall
14 March	Bournemouth	England	Chelsea Village
18 March	Birmingham	England	Birmingham Town Hall
24 March	Newcastle upon Tyne	England	Mayfair Ballroom
~~17 April~~ (cancelled)	Gravesend	England	New Lord's Club
20 April	Harlow	England	The Playhouse
21 April	Manchester	England	Free Trade Hall
29 April	High Wycombe	England	Wycombe Town Hall
30 April	Plymouth	England	Plymouth Guildhall
3 May	Aberystwyth	Wales	Aberystwyth University
6 May	London	England	Kingston Polytechnic
7 May	Hemel Hempstead	England	Pavilion
11 May	Worthing	England	Assembly Hall
12 May	London	England	Polytechnic of Central London
13 May	Slough	England	Slough Technical College
16 May	London	England	Unknown venue
19 May	Oxford	England	Oxford Polytechnic
20 May	Oxford	England	Oxford Polytechnic
25 May	Bournemouth	England	Chelsea Village
27 May	Epsom	England	Ebbisham
2 June	Newcastle upon Tyne	England	Newcastle City Hall
3 June	Liverpool	England	Liverpool Stadium
4 June	Preston	England	Preston Public Hall
6 June	Bradford	England	St George's Hall
7 June	Sheffield	England	Sheffield City Hall
8 June	Middlesbrough	England	Middlesbrough Town Hall
~~10 June~~ (cancelled)	Leicester	England	Leicester Polytechnic
13 June	Bristol	England	Colston Hall
16 June	Torquay	England	Torquay Town Hall
17 June	Oxford	England	Oxford Town Hall
19 June	Southampton	England	Southampton Guildhall
21 June	Dunstable	England	Dunstable Civic Hall
24 June	Guildford	England	Guildford Civic Hall
25 June	Croydon	England	Greyhound
~~30 June~~ (cancelled)	High Wycombe	England	Royal Grammar School
1 July	Weston-super-Mare	England	Winter Gardens Pavilion
2 July	Torquay	England	Rainbow Pavilion
8 July	London	England	Royal Festival Hall
14 July	London	England	King's Cross Cinema
15 July	Aylesbury	England	Friar's Club
19 August	London	England	Rainbow Theatre
20 August	London	England	Rainbow Theatre
27 August	Bristol	England	Locarno Electric Village
30 August	London	England	Rainbow Theatre
31 August	Boscombe	England	Royal Ballroom
1 September	Doncaster	England	Top Rank Suite
2 September	Manchester	England	Hard Rock
3 September	Manchester	England	Hard Rock
4 September	Liverpool	England	Top Rank Suite
5 September	Sunderland	England	Top Rank Suite
6 September	Sheffield	England	Top Rank Suite
7 September	Hanley	England	Top Rank Suite
North America
22 September	Cleveland	United States	Cleveland Music Hall
24 September	Memphis	United States	Ellis Auditorium
28 September	New York City	United States	Carnegie Hall
1 October	Boston	United States	Boston Music Hall (Note: Recordings released on the 2003 Aladdin Sane bonus disc.)
7 October	Chicago	United States	Auditorium Theatre
8 October	Detroit	United States	Fisher Theater
10 October	St. Louis	United States	Kiel Auditorium
11 October	St. Louis	United States	Kiel Auditorium
15 October	Kansas City	United States	Memorial Hall
20 October	Santa Monica	United States	Santa Monica Civic Auditorium (Note: Show released on Santa Monica '72 (1994) and Live Santa Monica '72 (2008).)
21 October	Santa Monica	United States	Santa Monica Civic Auditorium
27 October	San Francisco	United States	Winterland Ballroom
28 October	San Francisco	United States	Winterland Ballroom
31 October	Seattle	United States	Paramount Theatre
1 November	Seattle	United States	Paramount Theatre
4 November	Phoenix	United States	Celebrity Theatre
5 November	Phoenix	United States	Celebrity Theatre
11 November	Dallas	United States	Majestic Theater
12 November	Houston	United States	Houston Music Hall
14 November	New Orleans	United States	Loyola University
17 November	Dania	United States	Pirates World
20 November	Nashville	United States	Nashville Municipal Auditorium
22 November	New Orleans	United States	The Warehouse
25 November	Cleveland	United States	Public Auditorium
26 November	Cleveland	United States	Public Auditorium
28 November	Pittsburgh	United States	Stanley Theatre
30 November	Upper Darby Township	United States	Tower Theater
1 December	Upper Darby Township	United States	Tower Theater
2 December	Upper Darby Township	United States	Tower Theater
Europe
23 December	London	England	Rainbow Theatre
24 December	London	England	Rainbow Theatre
28 December	Manchester	England	Hard Rock
29 December	Manchester	England	Hard Rock

=== 1973 ===
List of tour dates with date, city, country and venue
Date	City	Country	Venue
5 January	Glasgow	Scotland	Green's Playhouse
6 January	Edinburgh	Scotland	Empire Theatre
7 January	Newcastle upon Tyne	England	Newcastle City Hall
9 January	Preston	England	Guild Hall
North America
14 February	New York City	United States	Radio City Music Hall
15 February	New York City	United States	Radio City Music Hall
16 February	Upper Darby	United States	Tower Theater
17 February (2 shows)	Upper Darby	United States	Tower Theater
18 February (2 shows)	Upper Darby	United States	Tower Theater
19 February (2 shows)	Upper Darby	United States	Tower Theater
23 February	Nashville	United States	War Memorial Auditorium
26 February (2 shows)	Memphis	United States	Ellis Auditorium
1 March	Detroit	United States	Detroit Masonic Temple
2 March	Detroit	United States	Detroit Masonic Temple
4 March	Chicago	United States	Aragon Ballroom
10 March	Long Beach	United States	Long Beach Arena
12 March	West Hollywood	United States	Hollywood Palladium
Asia
8 April	Tokyo	Japan	Shinjuku Welfare Pension Hall
10 April	Tokyo	Japan	Shinjuku Welfare Pension Hall
11 April	Tokyo	Japan	Shinjuku Welfare Pension Hall
12 April	Nagoya	Japan	Nagoya City Public Hall
14 April	Hiroshima	Japan	Hiroshima Postal Savings Hall
16 April	Kobe	Japan	Kobe International House
17 April	Osaka	Japan	Osaka Welfare Pension Hall
18 April	Tokyo	Japan	Shibuya Public Hall
20 April	Tokyo	Japan	Shibuya Public Hall
Europe
12 May	London	England	Earl's Court
16 May	Aberdeen	Scotland	Music Hall
17 May	Dundee	Scotland	Caird Hall
18 May (2 shows)	Glasgow	Scotland	Green's Playhouse
19 May	Edinburgh	Scotland	Empire Theatre
21 May (2 shows)	Norwich	England	Theatre Royal
22 May	Romford	England	Odeon Theatre
23 May	Brighton	England	Brighton Dome
24 May	Lewisham	England	Lewisham Odeon
25 May	Bournemouth	England	Bournemouth Winter Gardens
27 May (2 shows)	Guildford	England	Guildford Civic Hall
28 May	Wolverhampton	England	Wolverhampton Civic Hall
29 May	Hanley	England	Victoria Hall
31 May	Blackburn	England	King George's Hall
1 June	Bradford	England	St George's Hall
~~2 June~~ (cancelled)	Leeds	England	University of Leeds (rescheduled to Rolarena 29 June)
3 June	Coventry	England	New Theatre Coventry
4 June	Worcester	England	Gaumont Theatre
6 June (2 shows)	Sheffield	England	Sheffield City Hall
7 June (2 shows)	Manchester	England	Free Trade Hall
8 June (2 shows)	Newcastle upon Tyne	England	Newcastle City Hall
9 June	Preston	England	Preston Guild Hall
10 June (2 shows)	Liverpool	England	Liverpool Empire Theatre
11 June	Leicester	England	De Montfort Hall
12 June (2 shows)	Chatham	England	Central Hall
13 June	Kilburn	England	Gaumont Theatre
14 June	Salisbury	England	Salisbury City Hall
15 June (2 shows)	Taunton	England	Taunton Odeon
16 June (2 shows)	Torquay	England	Torquay Town Hall
18 June (2 shows)	Bristol	England	Colston Hall
19 June	Southampton	England	Southampton Guildhall
21 June (2 shows)	Birmingham	England	Birmingham Town Hall
22 June (2 shows)	Birmingham	England	Birmingham Town Hall
~~23 June~~ (cancelled)	Boston	England	Gliderdrome
24 June (2 shows)	Croydon	England	Fairfield Halls
25 June (2 shows)	Oxford	England	New Theatre Oxford
26 June	Oxford	England	New Theatre Oxford
27 June	Doncaster	England	Top Rank Suite
28 June	Bridlington	England	Spa Ballroom
29 June	Leeds	England	Rolarena
2 July	London	England	Hammersmith Odeon (Note: Show released on Ziggy Stardust and the Spiders from Mars and Ziggy Stardust: The Motion Picture.)
3 July	London	England	Hammersmith Odeon

== Songs ==
Bowie varied his setlist throughout the tour. A setlist from the tour would include any of the following songs:

From David Bowie

- "Space Oddity"
- "Wild Eyed Boy from Freecloud"
- "Memory of a Free Festival" (performed as medley with "Life on Mars")

From The Man Who Sold the World

- "The Width of a Circle"
- "She Shook Me Cold" (usually a snippet played as bassline and guitar solo throughout soloing of "I Feel Free")
- "The Supermen"

From Hunky Dory

- "Changes"
- "Oh! You Pretty Things"
- "Life on Mars?"
- "Quicksand" (performed as medley with "Life on Mars")
- "Andy Warhol"
- "Song for Bob Dylan"
- "Queen Bitch"

From The Rise and Fall of Ziggy Stardust and the Spiders from Mars

- "Five Years"
- "Soul Love" (Performed only twice in Feb 1973)
- "Moonage Daydream"
- "Starman"
- "Lady Stardust" (on rare occasions in 1972)
- "Star" (Performed only once during 1972 radio show)
- "Hang On to Yourself"
- "Ziggy Stardust"
- "Suffragette City"
- "Rock 'n' Roll Suicide"

From Aladdin Sane

- "Watch That Man"
- "Aladdin Sane (1913-1938-197?)"
- "Drive-In Saturday"
- "Panic in Detroit"
- "Cracked Actor"
- "Time"
- "The Prettiest Star"
- "Let's Spend the Night Together"
- "The Jean Genie"

Other

- "I Feel Free" (from Fresh Cream (1966) by Cream; written by Pete Brown & Jack Bruce)
- "Ode to Joy" (from Symphony No. 9 (1824) by Ludwig van Beethoven; as the pre-show music)
- "All the Young Dudes" (from All the Young Dudes (1972) by Mott the Hoople; written by Bowie. Performed as medley with "Wild Eyed Boy from Freecloud")
- "Amsterdam" (the B-side of the "Sorrow" single (1973); originally from Olympia 1964 (1967) by Jacques Brel, written by Brel & Mort Shuman)
- "John, I'm Only Dancing" (non-album single released in 1972; the sax version was released the following year; written by Bowie)
- "Love Me Do" (included as a part of "The Jean Genie") (from Please Please Me (1963) by The Beatles; written by John Lennon & Paul McCartney)
- "My Death" (from La Valse à mille temps (1959) by Jacques Brel, written by Brel & Shuman)
- "Around and Around" (B-side of "Johnny B. Goode" single (1958) by Chuck Berry)
- "Sweet Jane" (Velvet Underground Song)
- "Got to Get A Job" (James Brown Song)
- "I Can't Explain" (The Who Song; Recorded later for Pin Ups(1973))
- "I'm Waiting for the Man" (from The Velvet Underground & Nico (1967) by The Velvet Underground and Nico, written by Lou Reed)
- "White Light/White Heat" (from White Light/White Heat (1968) by The Velvet Underground, written by Lou Reed)
