= The Power of the Heart: A Tribute to Lou Reed =

2024 compilation album

Compilation album
- Released: April 20, 2024
- Label: Light in the Attic

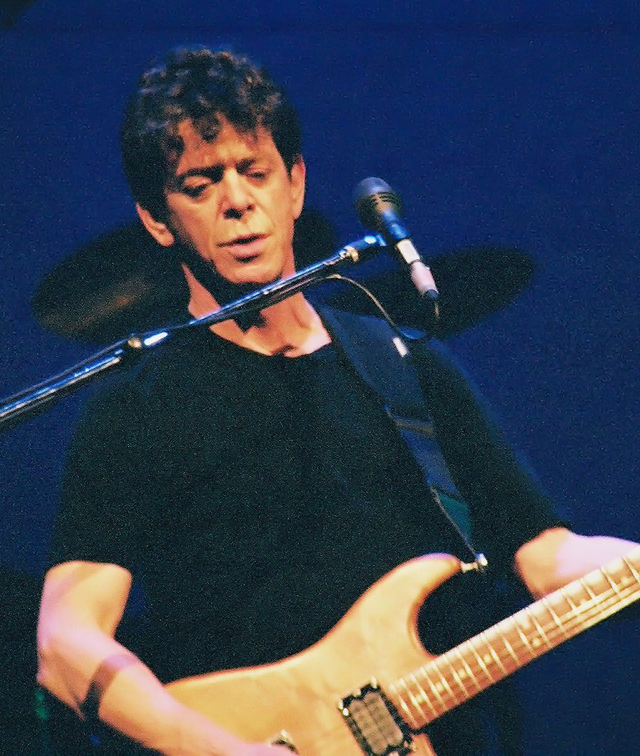
The compilation album commemorates Lou Reed (pictured in 2004)

The Power of the Heart: A Tribute to Lou Reed is a compilation album commemorating Lou Reed. The album was released on April 20, 2024, the 2024 "Record Store Day".

== Critical reception ==
Professional ratings
Review scores
Source	Rating
Mojo	3/5 stars

Jim Wirth of Mojo rated the album 3/5, calling it "the kind of tribute the professional Reed of his tai chi years would have appreciated."

== Track listing ==
1. Keith Richards: “I’m Waiting for the Man”
2. Maxim Ludwig / Angel Olsen: “I Can’t Stand It”
3. Rufus Wainwright: “Perfect Day”
4. Joan Jett and the Blackhearts: “I’m So Free”
5. Bobby Rush: “Sally Can’t Dance”
6. Rickie Lee Jones: “Walk on the Wild Side”
7. The Afghan Whigs: “I Love You, Suzanne”
8. Mary Gauthier: “Coney Island Baby”
9. Lucinda Williams: “Legendary Hearts”
10. Automatic: “New Sensations”
11. Rosanne Cash: “Magician”
12. Brogan Bentley: “The Power of the Heart”
