= Queen Bitch =

1971 song by David Bowie

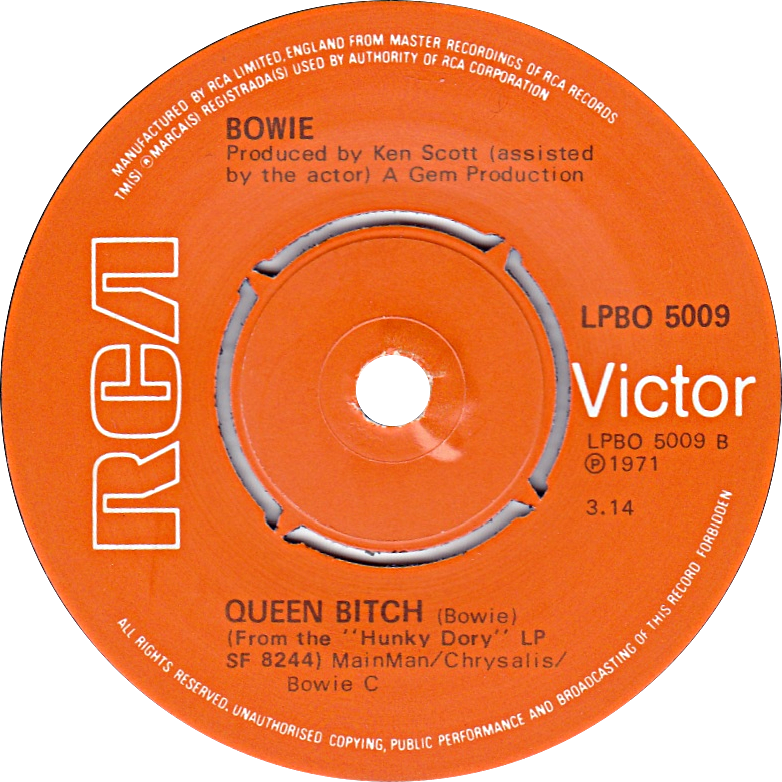
- B-side label of the UK vinyl pressing of the "Rebel Rebel" single release

Song by David Bowie

from the album Hunky Dory
- Released: 17 December 1971
- Recorded: June–July 1971
- Studio: Trident, London
- Genre: Glam rock; proto-punk
- Length: 3:18
- Label: RCA
- Songwriter: David Bowie
- Producers: Ken Scott; David Bowie

Official audio
- "Queen Bitch" (2015 Remaster) on YouTube

"Queen Bitch" is a song by the English singer-songwriter David Bowie. It was originally released on his 1971 album Hunky Dory before appearing as the B-side of the single "Rebel Rebel" in the United Kingdom in early 1974. Co-produced by Bowie and Ken Scott, the lineup consisted of the musicians who would later become known as the Spiders from Mars: Mick Ronson, Trevor Bolder and Mick Woodmansey.

A glam rock and proto-punk track, the song is a tribute to the Velvet Underground. It concerns a male character whose lover searches for drag queens and hookups after the narrator refuses his advances. Unlike the majority of Hunky Dory's tracks, "Queen Bitch" is primarily driven by guitar rather than piano.

"Queen Bitch" has been called one of the best tracks on the album, while some reviewers have considered it one of the best glam rock songs. Bowie performed it live on various BBC radio programmes and concert tours. He also performed it with Lou Reed at Bowie's 50th birthday bash in 1997. Artists who have covered the song include Green River, Seu Jorge and the Hotrats, while it has also appeared in various films and video games.

== Writing and recording ==
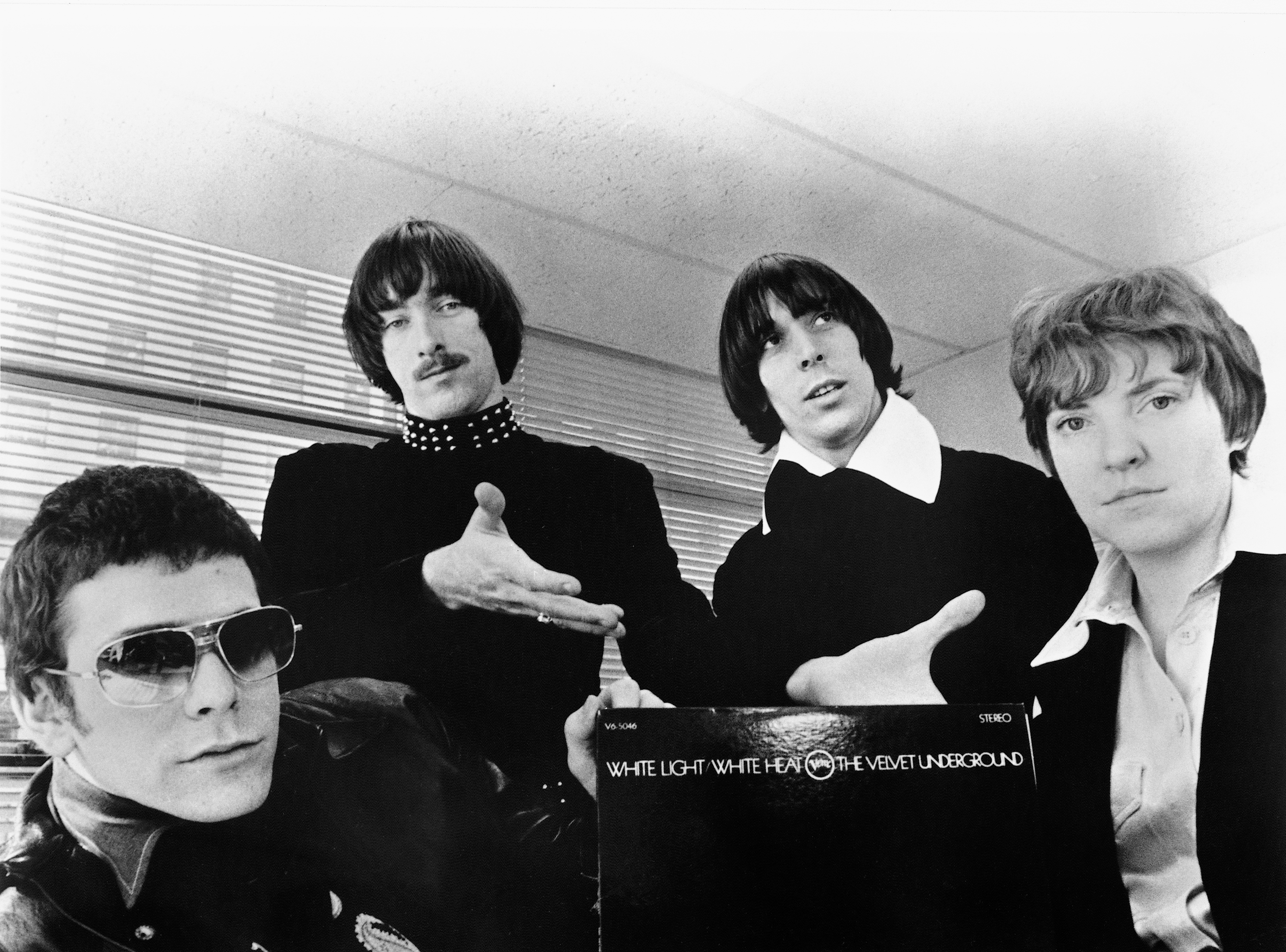
"Queen Bitch" was written as a tribute to the American rock band the Velvet Underground (pictured in 1968)

Following the critical success of his 1970 album The Man Who Sold the World, Mercury Records sent David Bowie on a promotional radio tour of America in February 1971. The trip inspired him to write tribute songs for three American icons: artist Andy Warhol ("Andy Warhol"), singer-songwriter Bob Dylan ("Song for Bob Dylan"), and the rock band the Velvet Underground, more specifically their singer Lou Reed ("Queen Bitch"). Bowie was a great fan of the Velvet Underground—he was one of the first artists to cover "I'm Waiting for the Man"—and wrote "Queen Bitch" as a tribute. "Queen Bitch" was debuted ahead of Hunky Dory on 3 June 1971 for BBC DJ John Peel's radio programme In Concert. Here, the song's arrangement is different than the final studio version. Bowie does a full-on impersonation of Reed, while the riff primarily stays acoustic.

Work on Hunky Dory officially began at Trident Studios in London on 8 June 1971 and concluded on 6 August. "Queen Bitch" was recorded sometime between 20 June and mid-July, according to biographer Chris O'Leary. Kevin Cann writes that the song was recorded by 26 July, as the finished track appeared on a promotional album compiled for Gem Productions. Co-produced by Bowie and Ken Scott, it was recorded with the musicians who would later become known as the Spiders from Mars: guitarist Mick Ronson, bassist Trevor Bolder and drummer Mick Woodmansey. Although the rest of the album featured piano playing from keyboardist Rick Wakeman, then-member of the Strawbs, he does not appear on "Queen Bitch".

== Composition ==
Part of the genius of 'Queen Bitch' is that it filters the archness of [Marc] Bolan and [Lindsay] Kemp through the streetwise attitude of [Lou] Reed: this is a song that succeeds in making the phrase 'bipperty-bopperty hat' sound raunchy and cool."

— Nicholas Pegg, 2016

As a tribute to the Velvet Underground, the song contains numerous references to the band, both musically and lyrically. The handwritten sleeve notes on the back cover of Hunky Dory read: "some V.U. White Light returned with thanks", acknowledging the influence of "I'm Waiting for the Man" and "White Light/White Heat". Meanwhile, the line "trying hard to pull sister Flo" is a reference to "Sister Ray".

The song starts with a countdown from Bowie leading into an eight-bar introduction, starting with his 12-string acoustic guitar before Ronson's thrashy electric guitar enters. While author Peter Doggett considers the main riff to be similar to the Velvet Underground's "Sweet Jane", O'Leary and biographer Nicholas Pegg state that it was borrowed from Eddie Cochran's "Three Steps to Heaven". After the bass and drums enter, a second guitar arrives, mixed into the left channel. O'Leary notes that Ronson's guitars clash throughout the track: the left-mixed guitar is raw, playing random tones rather than chords, while the right-mixed guitar "imposes itself on the acoustic" and doubles the bass part in the bars before the refrains. Bolder's bassline jumps octaves and goes up and down the G scale in the verses.

The lyrics of "Queen Bitch" are provocative. They concern a character whose male lover looks for drag queens and hookups on the street after the main character refuses his advances. As he watches his lover from the eleventh floor of his apartment building, he describes the drag queen wearing stereotypical attire, such as "satin and tat" and a "bipperty-bopperty hat". The phrase "satin and tat" was a saying made by dancer Lindsay Kemp, who used it to describe, in Pegg's words, "his taste in theatricality". Author James Perone notes that the sexual orientation of the narrator is unclear, meaning they could be homosexual or bisexual. He also addresses the "campiness" in Bowie's vocal performance and makes comparisons to Elton John's song "Daniel".

While the majority of Hunky Dory is categorised as art pop and melodic pop rock, "Queen Bitch" features a style akin to glam rock and proto-punk. Concurrently, the song is primarily guitar-led rather than piano-led, leading Pegg to call it Hunky Dory's "least representative track". Biographers and BBC Music's Daryl Easlea would note that the song's glam rock sound foreshadowed the direction Bowie was going to take on his next album The Rise and Fall of Ziggy Stardust and the Spiders from Mars (1972).

== Release and reception ==
RCA Records released Hunky Dory on 17 December 1971, with "Queen Bitch" sequenced as the fourth track on side two of the original LP, between "Song for Bob Dylan" and "The Bewlay Brothers". Over two years later, RCA selected it as the B-side of the "Rebel Rebel" single, releasing it in the UK on 15 February 1974 ahead of Bowie's forthcoming Diamond Dogs LP. The B-side, according to Spitz, was selected to provide the label with some "much needed fiscal plasma".

Michael Gallucci of Ultimate Classic Rock called it one of the best songs on Hunky Dory, citing it as an example of showcasing Bowie's growth as a songwriter and proof that he would become an unpredictable artist. Furthermore, Perone describes it as a "highly effective piece of pop music theater" that stands out as one of Hunky Dory's track that has aged the best, due to its catchiness and theatricality in the band's performance. Commentators, including Perone and AllMusic's Ned Raggett, call "Queen Bitch" a "glam rock classic". Jon Savage of The Guardian ranked "Queen Bitch" the second greatest glam rock song of all time in 2013, behind T. Rex's "Hot Love". Mojo magazine listed it as Bowie's 55th best track in 2015.

== Live versions ==
"Queen Bitch" was played frequently during Bowie's BBC radio sessions. A performance on the Sounds of the 70s programme on 18 January 1972 was released on the album Bowie at the Beeb in 2000. Another performance made during The Old Grey Whistle Test on 7 February 1972 was included on the DVD version of Best of Bowie (2002). On the Ziggy Stardust Tour, the song was performed at the Santa Monica Civic Auditorium in Santa Monica, California on 20 October 1972, which later appeared on Santa Monica '72 (1994) and Live Santa Monica '72 (2008). A later performance recorded at the Nassau Coliseum in Uniondale, New York on 23 March 1976, during the Isolar Tour, was included on Rarestonebowie (1995) and Live Nassau Coliseum '76 (2017). He continued to perform it on his Sound+Vision, Earthling and A Reality tours in 1990, 1997 and 2003–2004, respectively. In January 1997, Bowie and Lou Reed performed the song together at the latter's 50th birthday bash in New York City.

== Cover versions and appearances in media ==
The Seattle grunge band Green River recorded a cover of "Queen Bitch" in the late 1980s; it appeared on the Dry as a Bone/Rehab Doll compilation in 1990. Their cover received mixed reviews. The Brazilian singer Seu Jorge recorded a Portuguese version of "Queen Bitch" for the 2004 film The Life Aquatic with Steve Zissou, appearing in a climactic scene in the film. In 2010, the band the Hotrats recorded a cover version for their covers album Turn Ons. Bowie's original version also appeared in the soundtrack of the 2008 PlayStation 3 racing game MotorStorm: Pacific Rift, as well as the films Run Fatboy Run (2007) and Milk (2008).

In 2007, a cover version of "Queen Bitch" was made available as downloadable content for the Rock Band music video game series, as part of the "David Bowie Track Pack 01". The pack also includes "Moonage Daydream", and a cover version of "'Heroes'".

== Personnel ==
According to biographer Chris O'Leary:

- David Bowie – lead and backing vocals, 12-string acoustic guitar
- Mick Ronson – lead and rhythm electric guitar
- Trevor Bolder – bass
- Mick Woodmansey – drums

Production

- David Bowie – producer
- Ken Scott – producer, engineer
