= Live Santa Monica '72 =

Live album by David Bowie
- Released: 30 June 2008
- Recorded: 20 October 1972
- Venue: Santa Monica Civic Auditorium, Santa Monica, CA
- Genre: Glam rock
- Length: 74:21
- Label: EMI

David Bowie chronology
David Bowie (2007)	Live Santa Monica '72 (2008)	iSelect (2008)

David Bowie live albums chronology
LiveAndWell.com (1999)	Live Santa Monica '72 (2008)	VH1 Storytellers (2009)

Professional ratings
Review scores
Source	Rating
AllMusic	4.5/5 stars
NME	8/10
Pitchfork Media	7.7/10
Rolling Stone	5/5 stars

Live Santa Monica '72 is a live album by the English singer-songwriter David Bowie. It was released on 30 June 2008 in the United Kingdom and 22 July 2008 in the United States. It is the official release of KMET FM's radio broadcast, then bootleg album and – later – semi-legal release Santa Monica '72, recorded at the Santa Monica Civic Auditorium during the Ziggy Stardust Tour.

By November 2008 the album had sold 10,000 copies in US.

== Track listing ==
All songs written by David Bowie except where noted.

No.	Title	Writer(s)	Length
1.	"Introduction"		0:13
2.	"Hang On to Yourself"		2:46
3.	"Ziggy Stardust"		3:23
4.	"Changes"		3:27
5.	"The Supermen"		2:55
6.	"Life on Mars?"		3:28
7.	"Five Years"		4:32
8.	"Space Oddity"		5:05
9.	"Andy Warhol"		3:50
10.	"My Death"	Jacques Brel, Eric Blau, Mort Shuman	5:51
11.	"The Width of a Circle"		10:44
12.	"Queen Bitch"		3:00
13.	"Moonage Daydream"		4:53
14.	"John, I'm Only Dancing"		3:16
15.	"Waiting for the Man"	Lou Reed	5:45
16.	"The Jean Genie"		4:00
17.	"Suffragette City"		4:12
18.	"Rock 'n' Roll Suicide"		3:01

== Personnel ==
=== Musicians ===
- David Bowie – vocals, acoustic guitar, electric rhythm guitar on 'The Jean Genie'
- Mick Ronson – lead guitar, backing vocals
- Trevor Bolder – bass guitar
- Mick "Woody" Woodmansey – drums
- Mike Garson – keyboards

=== Technical personnel ===
- Mike Moran – recording engineer
- Grover Hesley – mixing engineer
- B. Mitchel Reed – KMET announcer
- Bob Griffin – KMET engineer
- Bill Fure – KMET engineer
- Bill Calucci – KMET studio tape editor
- Richard Kimball – KMET producer
- Ted Jensen – mastering engineer

== Chart performance ==
Chart (2008)	Peak position
Dutch Albums (Album Top 100)	81
French Albums (SNEP)	118
Hungarian Albums (MAHASZ)	37
Italian Albums (FIMI)	98
Scottish Albums (OCC)	66
Swedish Albums (Sverigetopplistan)	40
UK Albums (OCC)	61
