= Friars Aylesbury =

Music club in Aylesbury, England

- Type: Members club
- Founded: Aylesbury, Buckinghamshire, England in 1969
- Headquarters: Aylesbury, Buckinghamshire
- Website: http://www.aylesburyfriars.co.uk

Friars Aylesbury is a music club that runs in Aylesbury, Buckinghamshire, England. It opened in 1969 but closed down twice, once in 1970 for a period of nine months and again in 1984 for a period of twenty-five years. Friars Aylesbury reopened in June 2009 to tie in with its fortieth anniversary.

Friars Aylesbury ran as a music club in the market town of Aylesbury in Buckinghamshire between 1969 and 1984 in three distinct phases denoted by the venue in the town. Over these fifteen years, there were various trials and tribulations which saw Friars close to bankruptcy more than once but it survived and presented the best artists of its day and is acknowledged as being heavily responsible for the subsequent success of such artists as David Bowie, Genesis, Wishbone Ash, Mott the Hoople, Cockney Rebel, Sailor, Stackridge, Stiff Little Fingers, Marillion and more.

== History ==
=== New Friarage Hall (June 1969 - August 1970) ===
The club was started 2 June 1969 by David Stopps, a budding music manager. Stopps, when managing local band Smokey Rice, met teacher Robin Pike who organised local school dances. Pike suggested that Aylesbury needed a music club such as Mothers in Birmingham. Stopps was initially reluctant feeling it may work better in nearby High Wycombe which had a bigger population. Persuaded otherwise, Pike had sounded out premises in Aylesbury, namely the ex-Servicemen's club, New Friarage Hall, in Walton Street which had a capacity of approximately 400. A committee was formed which aside from Pike and Stopps, featured also John Fowler (initially as he had made a financial investment) and local youngsters Adrian Roach, Jerry Slater and Terry Harms. Roach and Slater were pupils of Pike and ran their own enterprise running the Bog Hog Folk Club at the now defunct Derby Arms pub in Aylesbury. Collectively they promoted the early gigs and sold underground magazines that at that time could only be purchased in London. The first gig on Monday 2 June 1969 with blues guitarist Mike Cooper and progressive rock group Mandrake Paddle Steamer drew a crowd large enough to suggest that this might be a viable proposition. The next week, The Pretty Things played and then such bands as Free, King Crimson, Edgar Broughton, Genesis and Hawkwind played there.

During this time, Stopps was standing out as the promoter and public face at Friars and the only one able to do the job full-time. Gigs were starting to be put on at other venues in Dunstable (including a very successful Pink Floyd gig in 1969), Bedford, and Watford. This phase ended when the committee overseeing the ex-Servicemen's club refused to allow Friars to continue running there after August 1970 due to complaints about the noise from local residents.

=== Borough Assembly Hall (April 1971 - August 1975) ===
Having already used the 800 capacity Borough Assembly Hall for a couple of bigger gigs in 1969 (Fat Mattress and The Third Ear Band were the gigs concerned and the Friars team cheekily referred to the Borough Assembly Hall at that time as the 'Friars Auditorium'), the decision was taken to restart Friars at this venue in Aylesbury's Market Square despite misgivings of the venue's acoustics and its poor reputation from when it had been previously called The Grosvenor (although as The Grosvenor, acts such as Jimi Hendrix played). Stopps subsequently said that if the first gig hadn't have been a success, he would have closed Friars and taken up a career in advertising. As it was, that first gig on 17 April 1971 was a complete sellout featuring The Groundhogs and local act John Otway. Having successfully presented David Bowie twice in 1971 and early 1972, the third appearance on 15 July 1972 is seen by many as the greatest ever Friars Aylesbury concert when Bowie unveiled his Ziggy Stardust persona on the Aylesbury audience and many members of the press, including US journalists, who had been flown in especially for the occasion. 1972 saw performances too by Genesis, Lou Reed and Roxy Music as their reputations were taking off. Friars in this time presented two open air festivals in Rabans Lane in Aylesbury in 1973 and 1974. The years up to the end of Phase Two saw memorable performances from Mott the Hoople, the breakthrough of Cockney Rebel (who played four times in 1974 including a hastily arranged gig after scenes of pandemonium at one sold-out gig), Sailor and Dr Feelgood and many more. Phase Two came to an end in August 1975 when the hall closed in favour of the new purpose-built Civic Centre and Friars relocated there.

=== Vale/Maxwell Hall (September 1975 - December 1984) ===
Vale/Maxwell Hall, Civic Centre, Aylesbury – 13 September 1975 – 22 December 1984 and 1 June 2009 – 4 June 2010 (capacity approx 1,250, decreased to 1,100 by 2009).

The new Civic hall was originally called the Vale Hall in keeping with local historical name themed rooms in the building. It was officially renamed the Maxwell Hall in 1977 in honour of late Councillor Reg Maxwell. The move to a new 1,250 capacity venue offered Friars opportunities it had only dreamed of in terms of artist stature and physical presentations and this helped cement Friars reputation in the music industry.

Within a few weeks of moving to the Vale Hall, Tangerine Dream and their production played Friars, other bands like Sailor, Stackridge and Dr Feelgood made the step up, increasing popularity. Camel's stage show which they could not fit in before now fitted.

A major coup for Friars and a lot of press attention was the first live appearance anywhere in five years of Iggy Pop in 1977. His band featured David Bowie on keyboards returning to Friars. Peter Gabriel made his long-awaited return to Friars in 1979 featuring Phil Collins as special guest.

Another free festival followed in 1978, this time with local act, now a celebrity and hitmaker, John Otway headlining in the Market Square to 20,000 people and this was subsequently filmed for ATV's Stardust Man documentary (this documentary was originally going to be about Friars but the producers decided to pick up Otway's story). In 1978 the biggest production ever seen at Friars arrived in the shape of Steve Hackett's first solo tour. This was superseded in 1979 by Gary Numan's huge production and trumped in 1980 by Genesis coming back to one of their favourite early venues.

The Police having played on the up in 1979 came back as world superstars in 1982. Like the Genesis gig in 1980, the stage had to be specially extended in terms of width and depth to cater for the lighting rig. The Clash played four times, the final time in 1982 at Stoke Mandeville Stadium sports hall. This venue was never used again despite its size due to the logistical problems of presenting a gig in a venue not designed for that purpose.

Genesis and The Police, world superstars by the time they came to Friars in 1980 and 1982, ensured demand for tickets for far outstripped supply. On both occasions, Aylesbury Cattle Market had hundreds of people queuing overnight and press and television attention.

Friars championed local music and bands and aside from John Otway and Wild Willy Barrett, bands like Marillion, Orthi, Disco Students, Warren Harry, Kajagoogoo and Howard Jones were strongly supported and encouraged.

Although the quality of gigs in 1983 and 1984 was generally high, it was proving difficult in the advent of the video age to attract decent working bands as fewer were touring. This resulted in some big gaps in the Friars schedules. In 1984 there were some weaker concerts culminating in Friars 15th Birthday Party with the Scottish band Fiction Factory being attended by not much more than 100 people.

David Stopps, due to the phenomenal rise of Howard Jones who he was managing, was devoting less of his time to Friars, but the reasons it shut were not down to Jones' success, but more to the harsh financial reality that Friars had started to lose a lot of money. Whilst no-one knew it then, the last gig turned out to be Marillion's sold-out homecoming in December 1984.

Stopps issued a press statement in spring 1985 stating that Friars was going to be closed down because of increasing running costs, and because bands were trading on favours and coming back to Friars at lower fees because they loved the place. The last straw was a 'well known band' pulling out of a gig at Friars to earn more elsewhere. The band was never officially named but strongly thought to be King, who were about to go very big.

=== Rebirth of Friars (June 2009 – June 2010) ===
A 40th anniversary concert was organised for 1 June 2009 almost exactly 40 years to the day since the first Friars concert, and nearly 25 years after the last. The concert featured bands from the early era, The Pretty Things, Edgar Broughton Band and The Groundhogs. This was considered successful, so another concert was held on 23 October 2009, with Friars legends Stiff Little Fingers, Penetration and The Disco Students selling out well in advance for SLF's return after 27 years. The final anniversary concert, billed as the probably last Christmas party, took place on 27 November with Kid Creole and the Coconuts and China Crisis.

The last concert at the Civic Centre before it shut in June 2010, was Paul Weller supported by John Otway. A permanent art installation created by Year 10 pupils at Cottesloe School, celebrating the artists who had played Friars, was unveiled in September 2010.

=== Waterside Theatre (October 2010 onwards) ===
In October 2010 Friars moved to its biggest venue - the Waterside Theatre - with an approx capacity of 1,750. The first concert was headlined by Buzzcocks, with Eddie and the Hot Rods.

== Friars Heroes Awards / Friars Hall of Fame ==
Inspired by the Friars Aylesbury Cup awarded for many years by David Stopps to artists who had made sensational breakthroughs in different ways. Recipients of this award included Sailor, Cockney Rebel, John Otway, Genesis and Toyah.

The Friars Aylesbury website, to commemorate the 40th anniversary of Friars and with the agreement of Stopps, has been awarding special engraved Friars Heroes Awards through 2009 and again in 2010 to those artists whose performances are etched in the Friars fabric.

Awards have been made thus far to Sailor, The Jam, Stiff Little Fingers, Marillion/Fish, John Otway, Wild Willy Barrett, Howard Jones, The Pretty Things, The Groundhogs, David Stopps, Edgar Broughton Band, Mott The Hoople, Ian Hunter, Mike Cooper, Mandrake Paddle Steamer, Jonathan Kelly, Eddie and the Hot Rods, Stackridge, Steve Hackett, Penetration, Simon Cheetham/Disco Students, Kid Creole and the Coconuts, China Crisis, Paul Weller, Robin Pike and Kris Needs.
