= The Best of David Bowie 1969/1974 =

Compilation album by David Bowie
- Released: 7 October 1997
- Recorded: 1969–1974
- Genres: Rock; glam rock
- Length: 77:34
- Label: EMI
- Producer: Various

David Bowie chronology
The Deram Anthology 1966–1968 (1997)	The Best of David Bowie 1969/1974 (1997)	Earthling in the City (1997)

David Bowie compilation chronology
The Deram Anthology 1966–1968 (1997)	The Best of David Bowie 1969/1974 (1997)	The Best of David Bowie 1974/1979 (1998)

Professional ratings
Review scores
Source	Rating
AllMusic	4/5 stars
Pitchfork	8.9/10
Robert Christgau	(choice cut)
The Encyclopedia of Popular Music	3/5 stars
The Rolling Stone Album Guide	4/5 stars
Uncut	4/5 stars

The Best of David Bowie 1969/1974 is a compilation album by English singer-songwriter David Bowie, released by EMI in 1997. The US release of the album was pulled from the stores because of multiple inaccuracies in the credits and liner notes. It was re-released by EMI-CAPITOL Entertainment Properties the following year (1998) in the US as part of the essential collection, with a new cover and corrected information as a limited edition. This album was also included as the first disc of the compilation The Platinum Collection (2005/2006).

There are three uncredited rarities included on the album. They are: "John, I'm Only Dancing" (Sax version) – recorded during the sessions for the Aladdin Sane album; "The Prettiest Star" (Marc Bolan stereo version) – the original 1970 single release that features Marc Bolan on lead guitar; and "All the Young Dudes (Studio version)" – the original Bowie studio version from 1973.

== Track listing ==
All songs written by David Bowie, except where noted.

No.	Title	Writer(s)	Place of Origin	Length
1.	"The Jean Genie"		Aladdin Sane, 1973	4:08
2.	"Space Oddity"		David Bowie, 1969	5:15
3.	"Starman"		The Rise and Fall of Ziggy Stardust and the Spiders from Mars, 1972	4:18
4.	"Ziggy Stardust"		The Rise and Fall of Ziggy Stardust and the Spiders from Mars, 1972	3:16
5.	"John, I'm Only Dancing" (Sax version)		Non-album single, released in 1973; the original version released the previous year	2:42
6.	"Rebel Rebel"		Diamond Dogs, 1974	4:30
7.	"Let's Spend the Night Together"	Mick Jagger, Keith Richards	Aladdin Sane; originally by The Rolling Stones released as a non-album double A-side single in the UK and Between the Buttons in the U.S. in 1967	3:07
8.	"Suffragette City"		The Rise and Fall of Ziggy Stardust and the Spiders from Mars, 1972	3:27
9.	"Oh! You Pretty Things"		Hunky Dory, 1971	3:14
10.	"Velvet Goldmine"		B-side of the 1975 single reissue of "Space Oddity"; recorded in 1971 for Ziggy Stardust	3:11
11.	"Drive-In Saturday"		Aladdin Sane, 1973	4:29
12.	"Diamond Dogs"		Diamond Dogs, 1974	6:05
13.	"Changes"		Hunky Dory, 1971	3:34
14.	"Sorrow"	Bob Feldman, Jerry Goldstein, Richard Gottehrer	Pin Ups, 1973; originally by The McCoys in 1965 and made famous by The Merseys the following year	2:55
15.	"The Prettiest Star" (Marc Bolan stereo version)		Recorded in 1970 as a follow-up to "Space Oddity"; re-recorded for Aladdin Sane in 1972	3:14
16.	"Life on Mars?"		Hunky Dory, 1971	3:52
17.	"Aladdin Sane (1913-1938-197?)"		Aladdin Sane, 1973	5:10
18.	"The Man Who Sold the World"		The Man Who Sold the World, 1970	3:56
19.	"Rock 'n' Roll Suicide"		The Rise and Fall of Ziggy Stardust and the Spiders from Mars, 1972	3:00
20.	"All the Young Dudes" (Studio version)		Originally by Mott the Hoople from All the Young Dudes, 1972; was recorded in that same year for Aladdin Sane and was released in mono sound for this compilation	4:11

Japanese bonus track
No.	Title	Place of Origin	Length
20.	"Lady Stardust" (Put in as "Suffragette City"'s replacement)	Ziggy Stardust	3:21

== Charts ==
Chart (1997–2016)	Peak position
Australian Albums (ARIA)	14
Canadian Albums (Billboard)	54
Danish Albums (Hitlisten)	36
Dutch Albums (Album Top 100)	81
French Albums (SNEP)	87
Irish Albums (IRMA)	27
Italian Albums (FIMI)	40
New Zealand Albums (RMNZ)	14
Scottish Albums (Official Charts)	22
Swiss Albums (Schweizer Hitparade)	58
UK Albums (OCC)	11

== Certifications ==
Region	Certification	Certified units/sales
New Zealand (RMNZ)	Gold	7,500^{^}
United Kingdom (BPI)	Platinum	300,000^{^}
^{^} Shipments figures based on certification alone.
