= Hang On to Yourself =

1972 song by David Bowie

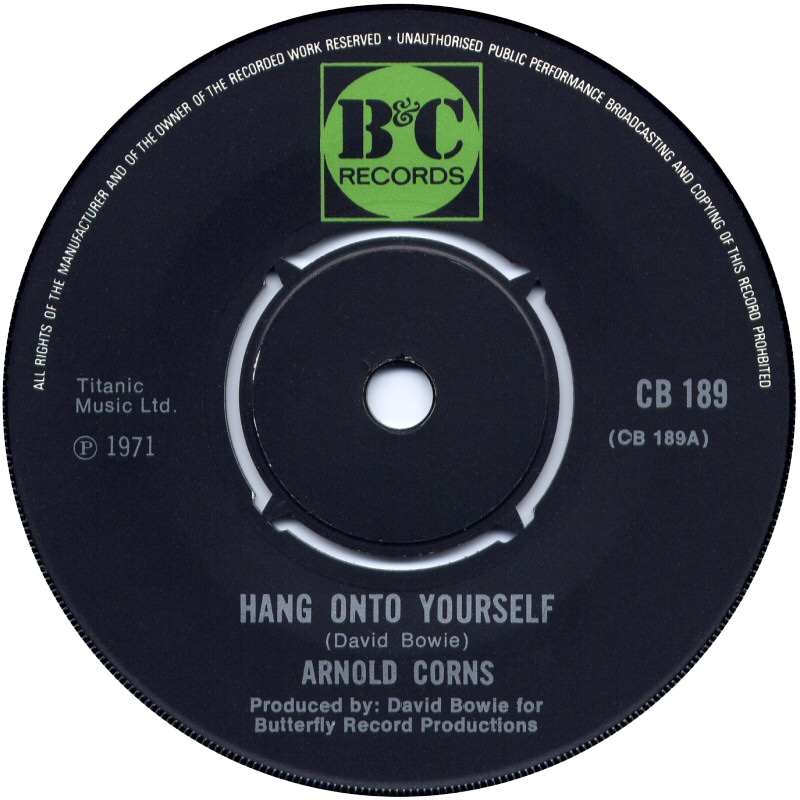
- A-side label of the 1972 UK single

Single by Arnold Corns
- B-side: "Man in the Middle"
- Released: 7 May 1971 (as B-side of "Moonage Daydream"); 11 August 1972 (A-side single)
- Recorded: 25 February 1971
- Studio: Radio Luxembourg, London
- Genre: Glam rock; proto-punk
- Length: 2:51
- Label: B&C
- Songwriter: David Bowie
- Producer: David Bowie

Arnold Corns singles chronology
"Moonage Daydream" (1971)	"Hang On to Yourself" (1972)

"Hang On to Yourself"

Song by David Bowie

from the album The Rise and Fall of Ziggy Stardust and the Spiders from Mars
- Released: 16 June 1972
- Recorded: November 1971
- Studio: Trident, London
- Genre: Glam rock; proto-punk
- Length: 2:38
- Label: RCA
- Songwriter: David Bowie
- Producers: David Bowie; Ken Scott

"Hang On to Yourself" is a song written by the English singer-songwriter David Bowie in 1971 and released as a single with his band Arnold Corns. A re-recorded version, recorded in November 1971 at Trident Studios in London, was released on the album The Rise and Fall of Ziggy Stardust and the Spiders from Mars. The main riff is representative of glam rock's influence as a bridge between 1950s rock and roll, specifically rockabilly, and the punk to come; it draws on rockabilly influences such as Eddie Cochran, in a way that would influence punk records such as "Teenage Lobotomy" by Ramones.

== Arnold Corns version ==
The Arnold Corns version of "Hang On to Yourself"—recorded at the Radio Luxembourg studios in London on 25 February 1971—was first released by B&C as the B-side to the single "Moonage Daydream" in the UK on 7 May 1971. On 11 August 1972, it was released again, this time as an A-side, by B&C.

1. "Hang On to Yourself" – 2:55
2. "The Man in the Middle" – 4:20

The Arnold Corns version was a bonus track on the 1990 Rykodisc/EMI remastering of Bowie's album The Man Who Sold the World. In 2002, this version appeared on the bonus disc of the Ziggy Stardust album's 30th Anniversary 2-CD reissue, and in 2015 it was included on Re:Call 1, part of the Five Years (1969–1973) boxed set.

The official band line-up, fronted by dress designer Freddi Buretti, was a total fabrication; Buretti was at the session but his contributions were simply lost alongside Bowie's.

== Personnel ==
Arnold Corns version

Personnel per Kevin Cann.

- David Bowie – vocals, piano
- Mark Carr-Pritchard – guitar
- Peter DeSomogyi – bass
- Tim Broadbent – drums, tambourine

Ziggy Stardust version

Personnel per Kevin Cann.

- David Bowie – vocals, acoustic guitar
- Mick Ronson – lead guitar
- Trevor Bolder – bass guitar
- Mick "Woody" Woodmansey – drums

== Other releases ==
- The Ziggy Stardust version appeared on the B-side of the single "John, I'm Only Dancing" in September 1972.
- It was also released as the B-side to the single "Looking for a Friend" in May 1985.
- The Portuguese version of the single "Starman" from September 1972 also had "Hang On to Yourself" as the B-side.
- In November 1972 the Ziggy Stardust version was also released as the B-side of the US release of the single "The Jean Genie".
- It was released as a picture disc in the RCA Life Time picture disc set.
- It also appeared on the Japanese compilation The Best of David Bowie (1974).

== Live versions ==
- Bowie recorded the song for the BBC radio programme Sounds of the 70s Bob Harris on 18 January 1972. This was broadcast on 7 February 1972. On 16 May 1972, Bowie again played the song on Sounds of the 70s: John Peel, and this was broadcast on 23 May 1972. Both of these versions were released on the Bowie at the Beeb album in 2000.
- A live version, recorded for radio broadcast at the Santa Monica Civic Auditorium on 20 October 1972, part of the Ziggy Stardust Tour, was released on Santa Monica '72. This version also appeared on the Japanese release of Rarestonebowie and on the official 2008 release of that concert as Live Santa Monica '72.
- The version played at the famous "last concert" at the Hammersmith Odeon, London, 3 July 1973, was released on Ziggy Stardust: The Motion Picture.
- Performances from the Isolar II Tour were released on Stage (1978) and Welcome to the Blackout (2018).
- A November 2003 live performance from the A Reality Tour was released on the A Reality Tour DVD in 2004, and is included on the A Reality Tour album, released in 2010.

== Cultural influences ==
The opening bars of Hang On To Yourself have been cited as the influence for Okuda Hiroko's "Rock" rhythm and bass preset backing track included in the Casio MT-40 and subsequently used as the basis of nearly 500 compositions, by artists as diverse as Wayne Smith, 2 Live Crew, Sublime, and Moby.
