= Kansai Yamamoto =

Japanese fashion designer (1944–2020)

- 山本寛斎
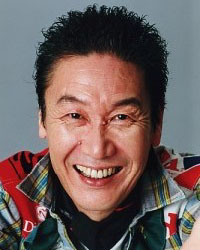
- Born: 8 February 1944; Yokohama, Kanagawa, Japan
- Died: 21 July 2020 (aged 76); Tokyo, Japan
- Occupations: Designer, Event producer
- Relatives: Mirai Yamamoto (daughter); Yusuke Iseya (half brother)
- Website: kansai-inc.co.jp

Kansai Yamamoto (山本 寛斎, Yamamoto Kansai; 8 February 1944 – 21 July 2020) was a Japanese fashion designer, most influential during the 1970s and 1980s.

== Early life and career ==
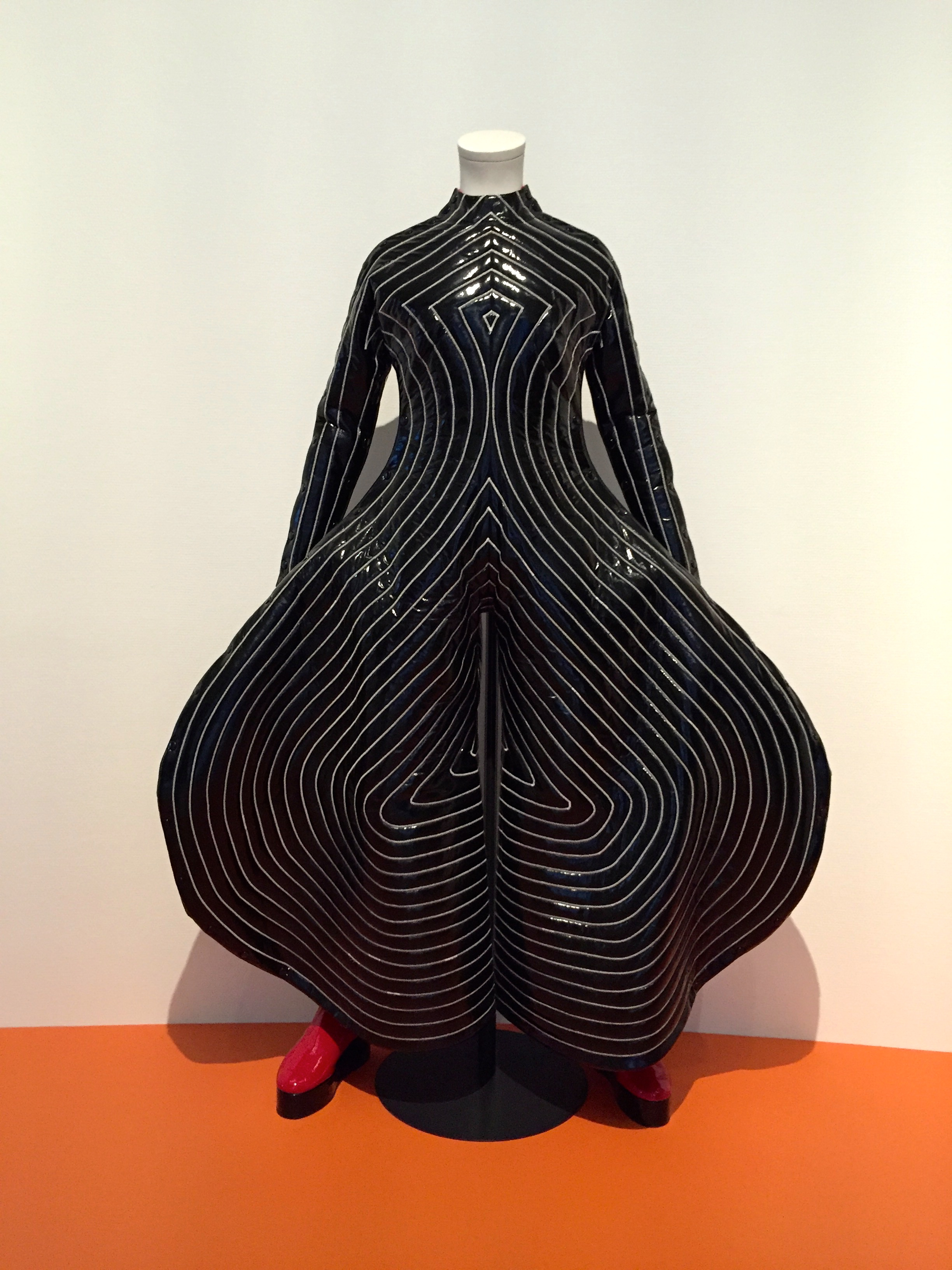
"Tokyo Pop" bodysuit that Yamamoto designed for Bowie

Kansai was born in 1944 in Yokohama, Japan and he raised in Gifu City, Japan. He focused on civil engineering in high school, and majored in English at the Nippon University until he dropped out in 1965 to focus on fashion. He apprenticed at ateliers of designers Junko Koshino and Hisashi Hosono while studying fashion on his own. He was awarded the Soen prize by the Bunka Fashion College in 1967.

Yamamoto's work displayed an aesthetic of "wild maximalism". It has been described as "transgressive excess" and the "opposite" of the concept of wabi-sabi.

In 1971, he opened his own company, Yamamoto Kansai Company, Ltd., Tokyo. His first collection debuted the same year in London and the United States at Hess's Department Store in Allentown, Pennsylvania, which was renowned for many avant-garde collections. He was the first Japanese designer to have a show in London. Kansai became famed for creating androgynous and futuristic stage costumes for David Bowie – most notably for his Ziggy Stardust Tour. His 1975 debut in Paris was followed by the opening of his Kansai Boutique in 1977. He received the Tokyo Fashion Editors award in 1977. He presented his final collection for fall/winter of 1992, although he kept lending his name to licensed products ranging from eyeglasses to tableware. After that he began a career as an event producer, notably for events he titled "Super Shows". As Kelly Wetherille writing for WWD puts it:

In the early Nineties, after two decades of showing and selling his avant-garde collections in London, Paris and New York, Yamamoto took a hiatus from the fashion world to focus on live entertainment events. His Super Shows, as he called them, combined elements of music, dance, acrobatics, traditional Japanese festivals and other spectacles, and were performed around the world, from Vietnam and India to Russia and Japan. The first such event, in Moscow’s Red Square in 1993, drew a crowd of 120,000.

== Later career ==
In 1999, he and Junko Koshino created a modern version of the kimono, reviving interest in this classical fashion. He is also known for his avant-garde kimono designs, including ones worn by Bowie. In 1999 he organized a fashion program under the aegis of the India-Japan Mixed Cultural Cooperation Committee.

In 2008, an exhibit named "Netsuki Shinten: Kansai Genki Shugi" (or "Passionate Exhibit: The Energy Principle of Kansai") was held at the Edo-Tokyo Museum. In 2009, a major retrospective of Yamamoto's work was exhibited at the Philadelphia Museum of Art. Yamamoto designed the Skyliner train, unveiled in 2010, that connects Japan's Narita Airport with central Tokyo. In July 2013, he made a comeback to the fashion industry with a showing in the 19th New Britain Mask Festival in Kokopo, Papua New Guinea. The same year he held a smaller scale fashion show at Tokyo, and a series of live fashion shows at the Victoria & Albert Museum. In 2018 Yamamoto and Louis Vuitton worked together to create classic Japanese art and Kabuki-inspired patterns and prints for LV's Resort 2018 collection.

Yamamoto died on 21 July 2020, after suffering acute myeloid leukemia since March 2020, at the age of 76, which was reported by his daughter, the actress Mirai Yamamoto, through her Instagram account, then through Kansai's own official account later.
