= Ziggy Stardust: The Motion Picture =

1983 live album by David Bowie

Live album by David Bowie
- Released: October 1983
- Recorded: 3 July 1973
- Venues: Hammersmith Odeon, London
- Genres: Glam rock; hard rock; art rock; proto punk
- Length: 69:31
- Label: RCA
- Producers: David Bowie; Mike Moran; Tony Visconti (2003 re-release only)

David Bowie chronology
Golden Years (1983)	Ziggy Stardust: The Motion Picture (1983)	Fame and Fashion (1984)

Singles from Ziggy Stardust: The Motion Picture
- 1. "White Light/White Heat" Released: October 1983

Professional ratings
Review scores
Source	Rating
AllMusic	2/5 stars
The Encyclopedia of Popular Music	3/5 stars
MusicHound	3/5
Pitchfork	7.6/10

Ziggy Stardust: The Motion Picture is a live album by the English musician David Bowie, released in October 1983 in conjunction with the film of the same name. The music was recorded during the Ziggy Stardust Tour at the Hammersmith Odeon in London on 3 July 1973, although the album was not issued by RCA Records until 1983. Before the 1983 release, these sessions had circulated as bootlegs, titled: His Masters Voice – Bowie and the Spiders From Mars' Last Stand.

The album documents the final show of the Ziggy Stardust tour and the last live-in-concert performance by Bowie as his Ziggy Stardust/Aladdin Sane persona/alter-ego (although it was not the final performance as Ziggy Stardust, which was three months later for the recording of the 1980 Floor Show). Before the final song, Bowie announced, "Of all the shows on this tour, this particular show will remain with us the longest, because not only is it the last show of the tour, but it's the last show that we'll ever do. Thank you." Many in the audience believed that Bowie himself was retiring.

== Production and release ==
D. A. Pennebaker filmed the concert and RCA recorded it with the intention of releasing a live album. However, the project was shelved for several reasons, rumoured to include Bowie's desire to leave Ziggy behind, and the poor quality of the recordings. Reasoning that RCA would most likely issue the material sooner or later regardless, Bowie and producer Tony Visconti mixed the recordings in 1981. This mix has been heavily criticised, although Visconti describes it as "more of a salvage job than an artistic endeavor" considering the state of the source material.

The album was eventually released in October 1983 as a double LP soundtrack to Pennebaker's documentary. Partly due to the limitations of the LP record format, the release omitted, shortened or reordered several items from the original tapes. "White Light/White Heat" was issued as a single in November.

== Rereleases ==
Ziggy Stardust: The Motion Picture has been released on CD three times; the first time on 7 August 1992 by Rykodisc. In April 2003, the '30th Anniversary 2-CD Set' was released by EMI/Virgin with copy control. Remixed by Visconti, it was considered a significant improvement on the original. It contains additional material, including introductions, spoken passages and the complete version of "The Width of a Circle"; "Changes" was also slotted into its correct position in the original concert's running order, following "Moonage Daydream". "The Jean Genie/Love Me Do" and "Round and Round" encore with Jeff Beck are still omitted. The continued absence of Beck's sequence has been variously attributed to an issue over royalties or to the guitarist feeling, in Tony Visconti's words, that "he didn't fit in the film". The two omissions are included as part of the 50th-anniversary edition, released in August 2023.

== Track listing ==
All songs written by David Bowie, except where noted.

=== Original release (1983) ===
Side one
No.	Title	Length
1.	"Hang On to Yourself"	2:56
2.	"Ziggy Stardust"	3:09
3.	"Watch That Man"	4:10
4.	"Medley: Wild Eyed Boy From Freecloud / All The Young Dudes/ Oh! You Pretty Things"	6:37

Side two
No.	Title	Writer(s)	Length
5.	"Moonage Daydream"		6:17
6.	"Space Oddity"		4:51
7.	"My Death"	Jacques Brel, Mort Shuman, Eric Blau	6:01

Side three
No.	Title	Length
1.	"Cracked Actor"	2:52
2.	"Time"	5:20
3.	"The Width of a Circle"	9:39

Side four
No.	Title	Writer(s)	Length
4.	"Changes"		3:35
5.	"Let's Spend the Night Together"	Mick Jagger, Keith Richards	3:08
6.	"Suffragette City"		3:06
7.	"White Light / White Heat"	Lou Reed	3:55
8.	"Rock 'n' Roll Suicide"		4:30

=== 30th Anniversary Edition (2003) ===
Disc one
No.	Title	Writer(s)	Length
1.	"Intro" (Incorporating: Beethoven's Ninth Symphony, arranged and performed by Wendy Carlos)	Ludwig van Beethoven	1:05
2.	"Hang on to Yourself"		2:55
3.	"Ziggy Stardust"		3:19
4.	"Watch That Man"		4:14
5.	"Wild Eyed Boy from Freecloud"		3:15
6.	"All the Young Dudes"		1:38
7.	"Oh! You Pretty Things"		1:46
8.	"Moonage Daydream"		6:25
9.	"Changes"		3:36
10.	"Space Oddity"		5:05
11.	"My Death"	Jacques Brel, Mort Shuman, Eric Blau	7:20

Disc two
No.	Title	Writer(s)	Length
1.	"Intro" (Incorporating: Rossini's William Tell Overture [Abridged], arranged and performed by Wendy Carlos)	Gioacchino Rossini
2.	"Cracked Actor"		3:03
3.	"Time"		5:31
4.	"The Width of a Circle"		15:45
5.	"Let's Spend the Night Together"	Mick Jagger, Keith Richards	3:02
6.	"Suffragette City"		4:32
7.	"White Light / White Heat"	Lou Reed	4:01
8.	"Farewell Speech" (spoken word)		0:39
9.	"Rock 'n' Roll Suicide" (Finale: "Pomp and Circumstance")	Bowie (Edward Elgar)	5:17

=== 50th Anniversary Edition (2023) ===
Disc two bonus tracks
No.	Title	Writer(s)	Length
8.	"Medley: The Jean Genie / Love Me Do / The Jean Genie" (Featuring Jeff Beck)	Bowie / John Lennon, Paul McCartney / Bowie	8:18
9.	"Round And Round" (Featuring Jeff Beck)	Chuck Berry	4:11

Inserted in between "White Light / White Heat" and "Farewell Speech" from 30th Anniversary Edition tracklist.

== Personnel ==
- David Bowie – guitar, vocals, saxophone, harmonica
- Mick Ronson – lead guitar, vocals
- Trevor Bolder – bass
- Mick Woodmansey – drums
- Mike Garson – piano, Mellotron, organ
- Ken Fordham – alto, tenor, baritone saxophone
- John Hutchinson – rhythm guitar, backing vocals
- Brian Wilshaw – tenor saxophone, flute
- Geoffrey MacCormack – backing vocals, percussion

Production

- David Bowie, Mike Moran – live recording production and mixing
- Ken Scott – recording engineer
- David Bowie, Tony Visconti, Bruce Tergeson – 2003 remixing

== Charts ==
1983–1984 weekly chart performance for Ziggy Stardust: The Motion Picture
Chart (1983–1984)	Peak position
Australian Albums (Kent Music Report)	67
Canada Top Albums/CDs (RPM)	46
New Zealand Albums (RMNZ)	39
Swedish Albums (Sverigetopplistan)	42
UK Albums Chart	17
US Billboard Pop Albums	89

2022–2023 weekly chart performance for Ziggy Stardust: The Motion Picture
Chart (2022–2023)	Peak position
Austrian Albums (Ö3 Austria)	21
Belgian Albums (Ultratop Flanders)	42
Belgian Albums (Ultratop Wallonia)	8
Dutch Albums (Album Top 100)	14
Hungarian Physical Albums (MAHASZ)	8
Italian Albums (FIMI)	71
Japanese Albums (Oricon)	25
Japanese Hot Albums (Billboard Japan)	25
Portuguese Albums (AFP)	14
Scottish Albums (Official Charts)	3
Swiss Albums (Schweizer Hitparade)	34
UK Albums (Official Charts)	10
