= The Jean Genie =

1972 single by David Bowie

Single by David Bowie

from the album Aladdin Sane
- B-side: "Ziggy Stardust"
- Released: 24 November 1972
- Recorded: 6 October 1972
- Studio: RCA, New York City
- Genre: Glam rock; blues rock; hard rock; pop rock
- Length: 4:07
- Label: RCA
- Songwriter: David Bowie
- Producers: Ken Scott; David Bowie

David Bowie singles chronology
"John, I'm Only Dancing" (1972)	"The Jean Genie" (1972)	"Drive-In Saturday" (1973)

Music video
- "The Jean Genie" on YouTube

"The Jean Genie" is a song by the English singer-songwriter David Bowie, originally released in November 1972 as the lead single to his 1973 album Aladdin Sane. Co-produced by Ken Scott, Bowie recorded it with his backing band the Spiders from Mars − comprising Mick Ronson, Trevor Bolder and Mick Woodmansey. According to Bowie, it was "a smorgasbord of imagined Americana", with a protagonist inspired by Iggy Pop, and the title being an allusion to author Jean Genet. One of Bowie's most famous tracks, it was promoted with a film clip featuring Andy Warhol associate Cyrinda Foxe and peaked at No. 2 on the UK Singles Chart.

== Background and recording ==
"The Jean Genie" originated on the Ziggy Stardust Tour as an impromptu jam, titled "Bussin'", on the tour bus between the first two concerts in Cleveland and Memphis, when Mick Ronson began playing the Bo Diddley-inspired guitar riff on his new Les Paul. It subsequently became the first song Bowie composed for Aladdin Sane, in autumn 1972 during his 1972 US tour, completing the song in New York City, where he spent time with the Warhol set's Cyrinda Foxe. Bowie later asserted, "I wrote it for her amusement in her apartment. Sexy girl." Bowie later in the 1990s described the song as "a smorgasbord of imagined America" and "my first New York song."

The recording took place at New York's RCA Studios on 6 October 1972. "I had a really great conversation with [bassist] Trevor Bolder," recalled Def Leppard's Joe Elliott. "I said, 'You remember when you were doing The Jean Genie?' He said, 'No. We did it in an hour and a half.'"

Mixing occurred the following week at RCA Studio B in Nashville, Tennessee; the original single mix is in narrow stereo, while the stereo soundscape is wider in the album mix.

== Music and lyrics ==
The song's chugging R&B riff is often compared to the Yardbirds, especially their cover of Bo Diddley's "I'm a Man", but was most probably inspired by French singer Jacques Dutronc's La Fille du Père Noël (1966), while the lyrics have been likened to the "stylised sleaze" of the Velvet Underground. The subject matter was inspired in part by Bowie's friend Iggy Pop or, in Bowie's own words, "an Iggy-type character ... it wasn't actually Iggy." The line "He's so simple minded, he can't drive his module" later gave the band Simple Minds their name.

The title has long been taken as an allusion to the author Jean Genet. Bowie was once quoted as saying that this was "subconscious ... but it's probably there, yes". In his 2005 book Moonage Daydream, he stated this less equivocally: "Starting out as a lightweight riff thing I had written one evening in NY for Cyrinda's enjoyment, I developed the lyric to the otherwise wordless pumper and it ultimately turned into a bit of a smorgasbord of imagined Americana ... based on an Iggy-type persona ... The title, of course, was a clumsy pun upon Jean Genet".

== Music video ==
Bowie at the Mars Hotel, 192 Fourth Street, San Francisco, California, 1972

Mick Rock directed a film clip to promote the song, in October 1972 in San Francisco, mixing concert and studio footage of Bowie performing with the Spiders from Mars, along with location shots of the singer posing at the Mars Hotel with Cyrinda Foxe. Bowie wanted the video to depict "Ziggy as a kind of Hollywood street-rat" with a "consort of the Marilyn brand". This led to Foxe's casting, and she flew from New York to San Francisco especially for the shoot.

Bowie also recorded "The Jean Genie" for BBC's Top of the Pops, the performance being broadcast on 4 January 1973. Unusual for the era, the four-piece band performed live, and included an extended guitar solo by Ronson. Tapes of this edition of Top of the Pops were subsequently wiped, but a copy was made by BBC cameraman John Henshall, who had utilised the then new fisheye lens camera techniques for the performance. Henshall was contacted to share his historic material, and was surprised to find he was the only one with a surviving copy. The film has since been preserved and was shown at the British Film Institute in December 2011. The BBC re-broadcast the clip in its Top of the Pops 2 Christmas Special on 21 December 2011, for the first time since the original broadcast in January 1973.

== Release and reception ==
"The Jean Genie" was released on 24 November 1972 by RCA Records (as RCA 2302) as the lead single to Bowie's 1973 album Aladdin Sane, with the 1972 song "Ziggy Stardust" as the B-side. On the album, it appears as the ninth and penultimate track. It spent 13 weeks on the UK Singles Chart, peaking at No. 2, making it Bowie's biggest hit until that time; it was kept off the top spot by Little Jimmy Osmond's "Long Haired Lover from Liverpool". In the US, it reached No. 71 on the Billboard Hot 100. While biographer David Buckley has described it as "derivative, plodding, if undeniably catchy", it remains one of Bowie's signature tunes and was often played at his concerts.

Upon release of the single in the U.S., Record World found the song "disappointing", saying that "Bowie, usually a master of melody and dynamics, has used an ancient riff on this more rhythmic number."

Some controversy arose in the UK when fellow RCA act the Sweet issued the song "Block Buster!", utilising a riff very similar to "The Jean Genie". The Sweet's single, written by Mike Chapman and Nicky Chinn, and recorded and released slightly later than Bowie's song, made No. 1 in the UK charts and No. 73 on the US charts while "The Jean Genie" was still in the UK Top 10. All parties maintained that the similarity was, in Nicky Chinn's words, "absolute coincidence". Chinn described a meeting with Bowie at which the latter "looked at me completely deadpan and said 'Cunt!' And then he got up and gave me a hug and said, 'Congratulations...'"

"The Jean Genie" has appeared on lists ranking Bowie's best songs by Uncut (11), The Guardian (19), NME (33), Mojo (64) and Consequence of Sound (67).

== Live versions and subsequent releases ==
With 1974's "Rebel Rebel", "The Jean Genie" was one of Bowie's most performed songs, featuring during all of his solo tours except for the 1999 Hours Tour and 2002 Heathen Tour. A live version recorded at the Santa Monica Civic Auditorium on 20 October 1972 appeared on the bootleg album Santa Monica '72 (1994), which received an official release as Live Santa Monica '72 in 2008. This live take was also included on the bonus disc of Aladdin Sane in 2003. The song was often used for experimentation by the musicians, incorporating other rock songs into the guitar breaks. One such version, recorded at the Hammersmith Odeon, London, on 3 July 1973, featured Jeff Beck on guitar and incorporated "Love Me Do" by the Beatles and "Over Under Sideways Down" by the Yardbirds. During the Diamond Dogs Tour, "The Jean Genie" was rearranged as a slow cabaret number, sometimes incorporating "Love Me Do" during the later shows; performances from this tour have featured on David Live (1974), Cracked Actor (Live Los Angeles '74) (2017) and I'm Only Dancing (The Soul Tour 74) (2020).

During the 1976 Isolar Tour, the song was used as the final encore, extending into lengthy guitar jams, false endings and ad-libbed vocals. A live take recorded on 23 March 1976 was included on Live Nassau Coliseum '76, released as part of the 2010 reissues of Station to Station, in the 2016 box set Who Can I Be Now? (1974–1976), and as a stand–alone album in 2017. Further performances from the 1978 Isolar II tour were included on the 2017 edition of Stage (1978) and Welcome to the Blackout in 2018. The song again appeared during the 1983 Serious Moonlight Tour into the same cabaret style as the 1974 tour. For the 1987 Glass Spider Tour, guitarists Peter Frampton and Carlos Alomar used the song for duets, incorporating the Rolling Stones' "(I Can't Get No) Satisfaction"; one performance appeared in the concert video Glass Spider (1988/2007). A variety of standards were incorporated into performances of "The Jean Genie" during the 1990 Sound+Vision Tour, most prominently Them's "Gloria". Bowie debuted a slower, acoustic version of the song at the October 1996 Bridge School benefit concert, while Billy Corgan of the Smashing Pumpkins joined him for a more conventional rendition during Bowie's fiftieth birthday concert in 1997. A live version from the Earthling Tour the same year was released on Look at the Moon! (Live Phoenix Festival 97) in 2021.

"The Jean Genie" has appeared on the compilation albums Changesonebowie (1976), The Best of Bowie (1980), ChangesBowie (1990), The Singles Collection (1993), The Best of David Bowie 1969/1974 (1997), Best of Bowie (2002), and The Platinum Collection (2006), The single mix has also appeared on Nothing Has Changed (2014) and Legacy (The Very Best of David Bowie) (2016). This mix was also released on the bonus disc of Aladdin Sane in 2003, and on Re:Call 1, part of the Five Years (1969–1973) boxed set, in 2015.

== Personnel ==
According to Chris O'Leary:

- David Bowie – lead vocals, rhythm guitar, harmonica
- Mick Ronson – lead guitar, backing vocals
- Trevor Bolder – bass
- Mick "Woody" Woodmansey – drums, tambourine

Production

- Ken Scott
- David Bowie

== Charts ==
Chart performance for "The Jean Genie"
Chart (1972–1973)	Peak position
Australia (Kent Music Report)	18
Belgium (Ultratop 50 Flanders)	26
Belgium (Ultratop 50 Wallonia)	7
Canadian RPM Top Singles	75
France (SNEP)	22
Irish Singles Chart	3
Netherlands (Dutch Top 40)	7
Netherlands (Single Top 100)	5
Spanish Singles Chart	8
UK Singles (Official Charts)	2
UK (Melody Maker)	1
UK (NME)	1
US Billboard Hot 100	71
West Germany (GfK)	37

== Certifications ==
Certifications for "The Jean Genie"
Region	Certification	Certified units/sales
New Zealand (RMNZ)	Gold	15,000^{‡}
United Kingdom (BPI)	Silver	200,000^{‡}
^{‡} Sales+streaming figures based on certification alone.

== Appearances in popular culture ==
- The song is featured in the BBC television series Life on Mars (named after a David Bowie song) and is mentioned by DCI Gene "the Gene Genie" Hunt, who periodically refers to himself as 'The Gene Genie'. In the episode "A Conflict of Interests" it is playing as they enter the club; in a later scene, while they escort Stephen Warren from his club, Sweet's "Block Buster!", with its comparable riff, is played. Hunt refers to himself as the Gene Genie more frequently in the sequel series, Ashes to Ashes (also named for a Bowie song) and his individual theme music on the latter programme is an instrumental version of "The Jean Genie" (retitled "Gene Genie"), created by series composer Edmund Butt.
- The song appears in Anton Corbijn's 2007 Ian Curtis biopic Control. In the film a young Curtis sings along to the song as it plays on a record player in his bedroom; the song continues to play as the scene changes to Curtis and Debbie going to a Bowie concert.
