= John Henshall (photographer) =

British photographer and writer (born 1942)

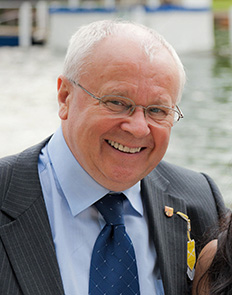
- Born: 6 January 1942 (age 84); Stockport, Cheshire, England
- Occupations: Photographer, cinematographer, writer

John Henshall FRPS FRGS FBIPP (born John Mark Henshall, 6 January 1942) is a British professional photographer, cinematographer, and writer on the art and science of photography and digital imaging.

== Career ==
In 1985, Henshall was elected Fellow of the Royal Photographic Society, later serving on its council and as chairman of its Associateship and Fellowship distinctions panel for Film and Video. He also registered and founded the first RPS website in 1996.

Henshall founded Electronic Photo-Imaging and the EPI-centre in 1991.

=== Current work ===
In December 2015 Henshall was elected honorary president of the Guild of Television Camera Professionals (GTC) formerly the Guild of Television Cameramen, a not-for-profit independent craft organisation of which he was a founder member in 1972.

=== Publications ===
- 1969. Sir H. George Fordham Carto-bibliographer. Map Collectors’ Series No 51. London: Map Collectors’ Circle.
- 1969. Dealers in Coins: The Directory of Dealers in Coins & Medals in the British Isles. Richmond, Surrey, UK: Numismatic Directories. ISBN 0 9500309 0 2
- 1992. Photographic Qualifications for Professionals. 1st ed. Ware, Hertfordshire, UK: British Institute of Professional Photography. ISBN 1 897801 00 9
- 1993–2006 inclusive. John Henshall's Chip Shop. Monthly articles in The Photographer magazine. Ware, Hertfordshire, UK: British Institute of Professional Photography. ISSN 0031-8698
- 1997. Photographic Qualifications for Professionals. 2nd ed. Ware, Hertfordshire, UK: British Institute of Professional Photography. ISBN 1 897801 00 9
- 2003. Going Digital Wedding and Portrait Photography. Rotovision. ISBN 2 88046 6938 Co-author with Joël Lacey.

== Honours and awards ==
- Master of Arts (MA) in honoris causa from the University for the Creative Arts (UCA) 30 June 2009.
- Oration speech at Guildford Cathedral
