= Andy Warhol (song) =

Song by David Bowie

from the album Hunky Dory
- A-side: "Changes"
- Released: 17 December 1971
- Recorded: Summer 1971
- Studio: Trident, London
- Length: 3:56
- Label: RCA
- Songwriter: David Bowie
- Producers: Ken Scott, David Bowie

Official audio
- "Andy Warhol" (2015 Remaster) on YouTube

"Andy Warhol" is a song written by the English singer-songwriter David Bowie in 1971 for the album Hunky Dory. It is an acoustic song about one of Bowie's early artist inspirations, the American pop artist Andy Warhol.

== Background ==
The album track opens with a series of strange electronic tones which fades into studio chatter in which producer Ken Scott mispronounces Warhol's name and Bowie repeatedly corrects him. Scott then solemnly reintroduces the take with the correct pronunciation, and Bowie asks if the tape is rolling. Upon realising he is indeed being recorded, Bowie bursts into laughter and the song proper begins.

The song is memorable for a distinctive repeated riff played by Mick Ronson on acoustic guitar.

Originally the song was written for Dana Gillespie, who recorded it in 1971, but her version of the song was not released until 1973 on her album Weren't Born a Man. Bowie produced Gillespie's version and Ronson also plays guitar. Gillespie performed the song in 1974 on the Dutch television programme TopPop.

David Bowie "Andy Warhol" (1971)
23-second sample from David Bowie's "Andy Warhol"

== Warhol's reaction ==
Bowie, an admirer of Warhol, sent him a copy of Hunky Dory and performed "Andy Warhol" for him in person at Warhol's studio the Factory in New York in September 1971, before the album was released. When Bowie played the song for him, Warhol hated it and left the room; Bowie recalled in 1997 that he found the meeting "fascinating" because Warhol had "nothing to say at all, absolutely nothing". Due to Warhol's typically minimal reaction, however, Bowie was never sure if he liked it.

== Other releases ==
The song was released as the B-side of the single "Changes" in January 1972. It also appeared on the Japanese compilation The Best of David Bowie from 1974. An edited version, with the dialogue in the introduction cut, as it was on the US single version, is included on Re:Call 1, part of the 2015 boxed set Five Years (1969–1973).

== Live versions ==
A performance sung by Dana Gillespie was recorded for BBC Radio's In Concert strand on 3 June 1971, presented by John Peel and first broadcast on 20 June that year. Bowie played this song at BBC's Sounds of the 70s with Bob Harris on 23 May 1972. This was broadcast on 19 June 1972, and in 2000 was released on the Bowie at the Beeb album. A performance recorded at Santa Monica Civic Auditorium on 20 October 1972 has been released on Santa Monica '72 and Live Santa Monica '72. The song was a 1972 regular performance, but it was not played again until the 1995 Outside Tour with Nine Inch Nails. One live performance from 1995 was released in 2020 on the live album Ouvre le Chien (Live Dallas 95). A November 1996 tour rehearsal recording of the song, which originally aired on a BBC radio broadcast in 1997, was released in 2020 on the album ChangesNowBowie.

== Personnel ==
- David Bowie - lead and backing vocals, acoustic guitar
- Mick Ronson - acoustic guitar, percussion
- Ken Scott - ARP synthesiser

== Homages ==
A riff from "Andy Warhol" (at 0:48) is quoted in Metallica's song Master of Puppets (at 6:19). It is an homage made by Cliff Burton and Kirk Hammett to whom Bowie was a huge influence. Rock band Stone Temple Pilots covered the song in their MTV Unplugged performance in 1993. Rachel Stevens' "Funky Dory (song)" was based around the guitar riff from "Andy Warhol" where David Bowie receives a writing credit. Funky Dory charted at number 26 in the UK in 2003.
