= I'm Waiting for the Man =

- 1971 German promo single picture sleeve

Song by the Velvet Underground

from the album The Velvet Underground & Nico
- Released: March 12, 1967
- Recorded: May 1966
- Studio: TTG, Hollywood, California
- Genre: Garage rock; proto-punk; hard rock
- Length: 4:37
- Label: Verve
- Songwriter: Lou Reed
- Producer: Andy Warhol

Official audio
- "I'm Waiting for the Man" on YouTube

"I'm Waiting for the Man" is a song by American rock band the Velvet Underground. Written by Lou Reed, it was first released on their 1967 debut studio album, The Velvet Underground & Nico. The lyrics describe a man's efforts to obtain heroin in Harlem.

In various reviews, it is described as "tough garage rock", "proto-punk classic", and "one of the all-time classic rock songs", with renditions by a number of artists.

== Recording ==
Along with "Venus in Furs" and "Heroin", "I'm Waiting for the Man" was recorded in May 1966 at TTG Studios while the band was staying in Hollywood. It has been musically described as garage rock, proto-punk and hard rock. The lyrics describe a man's efforts to obtain heroin. Despite the song's title, the lyrics refer to "my man" rather than "the man" throughout.

== Reception and legacy ==
In a song review for AllMusic, Dave Thompson called it "one of the all-time classic rock songs ... Over chunky guitar, clunking piano, and jackhammer drums, Reed half-sings, half-intones what he would once describe as a love song about a man and the subway." He notes that it has been recorded by numerous artists, including "David Bowie and the Stooges [who] both cut fascinating takes on the song". Most members of the Velvet Underground have performed the song based on their own interpretations.

In 2004 Rolling Stone magazine ranked the song at number 159 on its list of the 500 Greatest Songs of All Time. It was moved to number 161 in 2010 and finally re-ranked at number 81 in 2021. The magazine noted:

The Velvets mixed R&B rhythm-guitar workout, blues-piano stomp and dreamy art drone, as Reed deadpans a story about scoring $26 worth of heroin in Harlem. "Everything about that song holds true," said Reed, "except the price."

In 2012, Consequence of Sound included it in their list of the 100 greatest top songs of all time, ranking it number 65. In lists ranking the greatest songs from the 1960s, NME ranked it number 6, while Pitchfork placed it at number 27. In 2012, Paste ranked the song number 3 on their list of the 20 greatest Velvet Underground songs, and in 2021 The Guardian placed the song at number 9 on their list of the 30 greatest Velvet Underground songs.

== Personnel ==
- Lou Reed – vocals, lead guitar
- John Cale – piano, bass guitar
- Sterling Morrison – rhythm guitar
- Maureen Tucker – percussion
- Andy Warhol – producer
- Tom Wilson – post-production supervisor

== Other versions ==
=== David Bowie ===
In December 1966, David Bowie's manager, Kenneth Pitt, acquired an acetate of the then-unreleased The Velvet Underground & Nico and presented it to Bowie. Upon hearing "I'm Waiting for the Man", he went to his band at the time, the Buzz, and told them they were going to learn it: "We learned 'Waiting for the Man' right then and there and we were playing it on stage within a week." He later recalled in a 2003 interview with Vanity Fair: "Amusingly, not only was I to cover a Velvets song before anyone else in the world, I actually did it before the album came out. Now that's the essence of Mod." (Note: Jimmy Page has made a similar claim: "I'm pretty certain we [the Yardbirds] were the first people to cover the Velvet Underground." Several sources, including drummer Jim McCarty, indicate that the Yardbirds learned "I'm Waiting for the Man" during November 18–20, 1966, when they and the Velvet Underground were performing in Detroit. However, this is contradicted by a performance of the song with Jeff Beck and Chris Dreja on guitars and Page on bass, which would place it sometime between June 21, 1966, (Page's first gig with the group) and October 30, 1966 (when Beck quit the group). Other performances incorporated part of "I'm Waiting for the Man" in a medley with their version of "I'm a Man". One version from May–June 1968 is included on Last Rave Up in LA.)

Bowie first attempted to record "I'm Waiting for the Man" in the studio during the sessions for his 1967 debut album, and later properly recorded it with another band, the Riot Squad, on April 5, 1967. In his book Rebel Rebel, Chris O'Leary notes the subpar quality of the recording, writing that it "sounded as if they were making do with what they'd found in a school music room." This version later appeared on the Riot Squad compilations The Last Chapter: Mods & Sods (2012) and The Toy Soldier EP. In this version, Bowie misinterpreted the song's subject matter, containing the line "I'm just looking for a good friendly behind" instead of "I'm just looking for a dear, dear friend of mine". Tony Visconti later told biographer Nicholas Pegg: "A very young David Bowie didn't yet know that 'the man' in Harlem parlance meant the drug dealer. So he naturally assumed it was a gay encounter involving money."

Bowie performed "I'm Waiting for the Man", often titled as "Waiting for the Man", for BBC radio shows in 1972 (one recording appearing on 2000's Bowie at the Beeb) and frequently on the Ziggy Stardust Tour (one recording appearing on 1994's Santa Monica '72). He would further perform it on the 1976 Isolar Tour and the 1990 Sound+Vision Tour. While his 1967 recording followed Reed's original chord structure, Bowie made subtle changes to his live performances. He performed the song with Reed at his 50th birthday bash in 1997. David Buckley writes that Bowie's 1977 song "'Heroes'" was influenced by Reed's writing.

=== Orchestral Manoeuvres in the Dark ===
A cover version of the song by English duo Orchestral Manoeuvres in the Dark appears as an extra track on the rerelease of their 1979 self-titled debut album. In 2001 it was included on the band's album Navigation: The OMD B-Sides.

=== Keith Richards ===
In March 2024, the Rolling Stones band member Keith Richards released a cover of "I'm Waiting for the Man" for the 2024 tribute album The Power of the Heart: A Tribute to Lou Reed.
