= David Bowie BBC Sessions =

BBC radio sessions performed by David Bowie

David Bowie recorded twelve radio sessions for the BBC between 1967 and 1972. Many of the tracks – but not all – were released on the Bowie at the Beeb 2-CD Set (2000). Some of the tracks missing from the first few sessions not included on Bowie at the Beeb 2-CD Set appear on later editions of David Bowie (1967) and David Bowie (1969). A few more tracks appear on BBC Sessions 1969–1972 (Sampler) [1996]; Bowie at the Beeb 4-LP Edition [2016]). However, many of the missing tracks from the Bowie at the Beeb 2-CD Set are only available on bootlegs and online. 'Hang Onto Yourself' from 11 Jan 1972 has, to date, not appeared in either master tape or bootleg form. This is because many of the original mastertapes are long gone, with sometimes only the broadcast tapes existing, meaning songs that were recorded but not originally broadcast, or only broadcast in edited form, are lost; or in at least one case, only a partial recording of a broadcast exists, with the broadcast tape no longer available. This article gives an overview of all the sessions, along with where they have received their official release.

Unreleased | Missing

Four session tracks from John Peel (11 Jan 1972) exist in poor quality off-air recordings and 1 (at-the-time) broadcast track from the same session is still missing ('Hang onto Yourself').

BBC 'Radio 1 Club' Show Appearances

David Bowie appeared on this 'live' lunchtime radio one show during the Ken Pitt management period. Referenced briefly in the Ken Pitt book, 'The Pitt Report.' Oddly, these are not mentioned in the excellent, Ken Garner 'In Session Tonight' book. However, Kevin Cann references these in his, equally excellent 'Any Day Now' book. Bands would usually play several songs 'live' on the show, however, sometimes they would pre-record a BBC studio session ahead of the 'live' broadcast to be broadcast on 'R1 Club'.Another variation was to sing 'live' or with additional vocals to a backing track or even latest release.

Radio One Club: 28 August 1969, Leas Cliff Hall, Folkestone, Kent

Interviewed by Dave Cash about 'Space Oddity.'

Radio One Club: 25 September 1969

Interview with Keith Skues

Radio One Club: 14 November 1969, BBC Glasgow, Scotland

Interview with Dave Lee Travis

== Top Gear: 18 December 1967 ==
Bowie's first session for BBC Radio was recorded on the 18 December 1967, soon after the release of his first album, David Bowie (1967). The session was recorded at Piccadilly Studios and arranged and performed by Arthur Greenslade and his 16 piece orchestra with Bowie on vocals and playing guitar. The session was produced by Bernie Andrews.

Track	Title	Written by	Length	Broadcast date(s)	Release
01	"Love You till Tuesday"	Bowie	3:00	24 Dec 1967; 28 Jan 1968	David Bowie: Deluxe Edition (2009)
02	"When I Live My Dream"	Bowie	3:35	24 Dec 1967; 28 Jan 1968	David Bowie: Deluxe Edition (2009)
03	"Little Bombardier"	Bowie	3:28	24 Dec 1967; 28 Jan 1968	David Bowie: Deluxe Edition (2009)
04	"Silly Boy Blue"	Bowie	3:25	24 Dec 1967; 28 Jan 1968	David Bowie: Deluxe Edition (2009)
05	"In The Heat Of The Morning"	Bowie	2:40	24 Dec 1967; 28 Jan 1968	David Bowie: Deluxe Edition (2009)

== Top Gear: 13 May 1968 ==
Track	Title	Written by	Length	Broadcast date(s)	Release
01	"In The Heat Of The Morning"	Bowie	3:03	26 May 1968; 20 Jun 1968	Bowie at the Beeb; Conversation Piece
02	"London Bye Ta-Ta"	Bowie	2:36	26 May 1968; 20 Jun 1968	Bowie at the Beeb; Conversation Piece
03	"Karma Man"	Bowie	3:00	26 May 1968; 20 Jun 1968	Bowie at the Beeb; Conversation Piece
04	"When I'm Five"	Bowie	3:08	26 May 1968; 20 Jun 1968	David Bowie: Deluxe Edition (2009) Conversation Piece
05	"Silly Boy Blue"	Bowie	4:37	20 Jun 1968	Bowie at the Beeb; Conversation Piece

== Dave Lee Travis Show: 20 October 1969 ==
Track	Title	Written by	Length	Broadcast date(s)	Release
01	"Unwashed and Somewhat Slightly Dazed"	Bowie	4:04	26 Oct 1969	David Bowie Special Edition Conversation Piece
02	"Let Me Sleep Beside You"	Bowie	4:49	(not broadcast)	Bowie at the Beeb; David Bowie Special Edition; Conversation Piece
03	"Janine"	Bowie	3:05	(not broadcast)	Bowie at the Beeb; David Bowie Special Edition; Conversation Piece

== The Sunday Show [Live]: 5 February 1970 ==
Track	Title	Written by	Length	Broadcast date(s)	Release
01	"Amsterdam"	Jacques Brel trans. Mort Shuman	3:02	8 Feb 1970	Bowie at the Beeb: 2-CD set (2000)
02	"God Knows I'm Good"	Bowie	3:29	8 Feb 1970	Bowie at the Beeb: 2-CD set (2000)
03	"Buzz The Fuzz"	Biff Rose	2:21	8 Feb 1970	Width Of A Circle 2-CD set (2021)
04	"Karma Man"	Bowie	3:02	8 Feb 1970	Width Of A Circle 2-CD set (2021)
05	"London Bye Ta-Ta"	Bowie	2:36	8 Feb 1970	Width Of A Circle 2-CD set (2021)
06	"An Occasional Dream"	Bowie	2:51	8 Feb 1970	Width Of A Circle 2-CD set (2021)
07	"The Width of a Circle"	Bowie	5:58	8 Feb 1970	Bowie at the Beeb: 2-CD set (2000)
08	"Janine"	Bowie	3:30	8 Feb 1970	Width Of A Circle 2-CD set (2021)
09	"Wild Eyed Boy from Freecloud"	Bowie	4:20	8 Feb 1970	Width Of A Circle 2-CD set (2021)
10	"Unwashed and Somewhat Slightly Dazed"	Bowie	5:07	8 Feb 1970	Bowie at the Beeb: 2-CD set (2000)
11	"Fill Your Heart"	Biff Rose	2:21	8 Feb 1970	Width Of A Circle 2-CD set (2021)
12	"I'm Waiting for the Man"	Lou Reed	(unk)	(not broadcast)	lost
13	"The Prettiest Star"	Bowie	2:40	8 Feb 1970	Width Of A Circle 2-CD set (2021)
14	"Cygnet Committee"	Bowie	8:54	8 Feb 1970	Bowie at the Beeb: 2-CD set (2000)
15	"Memory of a Free Festival"	Bowie	6:40	8 Feb 1970 (3:41 edit)	full version lost / edit on Bowie at the Beeb: 2-CD set (2000); Tracks 2, 3, 6, 8 repeated on "Sounds Of The Seventies": 2 Sep 1970

== Sound Of The Seventies: 25 March 1970 ==
Track	Title	Written by	Length	Broadcast date(s)	Release
01	"I'm Waiting for the Man"	Lou Reed	5:49	6 Apr 1970; 11 May 1970	Width Of A Circle 2-CD set (2021)
02	"The Width Of A Circle"	Bowie	5:38	6 Apr 1970; 11 May 1970	Width Of A Circle 2-CD set (2021)
03	"Wild Eyed Boy From Freecloud"	Bowie	4:44	6 Apr 1970; 11 May 1970	Bowie at the Beeb: 2-CD set (2000)
04	"The Supermen"	Bowie	3:19	(not broadcast)	Width Of A Circle 2-CD set (2021)

== In Concert [Live]: 3 June 1971 ==
"The date of this session has been widely misquoted as 5 June", writes Pegg "but BBC records and Bowie at the Beeb confirm 3 June is correct".

Track	Title	Written by	Length	Broadcast date(s)	Release
01	"Queen Bitch"	Bowie	4:31	20 Jun 1971	A Divine Symmetry : 4-CD Box Set (2022)
02	"Bombers"	Bowie	3:14	20 Jun 1971	Bowie at the Beeb: 2-CD set (2000)
03	"The Supermen"	Bowie	3:08	20 Jun 1971	A Divine Symmetry : 4-CD Box Set (2022)
04	"Oh! You Pretty Things"	Bowie	(unk)	(not broadcast)	lost
05	"Looking For A Friend" vocals Mark Carr-Pritchard	Bowie	3:22	20 Jun 1971	Bowie at the Beeb: 2-CD set (2000)
06	"Almost Grown" backing vocals Geoffrey Alexander	Chuck Berry	2:46	20 Jun 1971	Bowie at the Beeb: 2-CD set (2000)
07	"Kooks"	Bowie	3:46	20 Jun 1971	Bowie at the Beeb: 2-CD set (2000)
08	"Song for Bob Dylan" vocals George Underwood	Bowie	4:46	20 Jun 1971	A Divine Symmetry : 4-CD Box Set (2022)
09	"Andy Warhol" vocals Dana Gillespie	Bowie	4:08	20 Jun 1971	A Divine Symmetry : 4-CD Box Set (2022)
10	"It Ain't Easy" vocals Bowie, Alexander, Underwood	Ron Davies	3:00	20 Jun 1971	Bowie at the Beeb: 2-CD set (2000)

== Sound Of The Seventies: 21 September 1971 ==
Track	Title	Written by	Length	Broadcast date(s)	Release
01	"The Supermen"	Bowie	2:52	4 Oct 1971; 1 Nov 1971	Bowie at the Beeb: 2-CD Set (2000)
02	"Oh! You Pretty Things"	Bowie	3:17	4 Oct 1971; 1 Nov 1971	A Divine Symmetry : 4-CD Box Set (2022)
03	"Eight Line Poem"	Bowie	2:57	4 Oct 1971; 1 Nov 1971	Bowie at the Beeb: 2-CD Set (2000)
04	"Kooks"	Bowie	3:23	4 Oct 1971; 1 Nov 1971	A Divine Symmetry : 4-CD Box Set (2022)
05	"Fill Your Heart"	Biff Rose	2:49	1 Nov 1971	A Divine Symmetry : 4-CD Box Set (2022)
06	"Amsterdam"	Jacques Brel trans. Mort Shuman	3:08	(not broadcast)	A Divine Symmetry : 4-CD Box Set (2022)
07	"Andy Warhol"	Bowie	2:52	(not broadcast)	A Divine Symmetry : 4-CD Box Set (2022)

== Sound Of The Seventies: 11 January 1972 ==
Track	Title	Written by	Length	Broadcast date(s)	Release
01	"Hang On to Yourself"	Bowie	(unk)	28 Jan 1972; 31 Mar 1972	Broadcast but lost
02	"Ziggy Stardust"	Bowie	3:19	28 Jan 1972; 31 Mar 1972	Rock n Roll Star! 5-CD set
03	"Queen Bitch"	Bowie	3:04	28 Jan 1972; 31 Mar 1972	Rock n Roll Star! 5-CD set
04	"I'm Waiting for the Man"	Lou Reed	5:24	28 Jan 1972; 31 Mar 1972	Rock n Roll Star! 5-CD set
05	"Lady Stardust"	Bowie	3:19	31 Mar 1972	Rock n Roll Star! 5-CD set

== Sound Of The Seventies: 18 January 1972 ==
Track	Title	Written by	Length	Broadcast date(s)	Release
01	"Queen Bitch"	Bowie	2:59	7 Feb 1972	Bowie at the Beeb: 2-CD set (2000); Rock n Roll Star! Box Set Jun 24
02	"Five Years"	Bowie	4:24	7 Feb 1972	Bowie at the Beeb: 2-CD set (2000); Rock n Roll Star! Box Set Jun 24
03	"Hang On to Yourself"	Bowie	2:50	7 Feb 1972	Bowie at the Beeb: 2-CD set (2000); Rock n Roll Star! Box Set Jun 24
04	"Ziggy Stardust"	Bowie	3:20	7 Feb 1972	Bowie at the Beeb: 2-CD set (2000); Rock n Roll Star! Box Set Jun 24
05	"I'm Waiting for the Man"	Lou Reed	5:25	(not broadcast)	Bowie at the Beeb: 2-CD set (2000); Rock n Roll Star! Box Set Jun 24

== Sound Of The Seventies: 16 May 1972 ==
Track	Title	Written by	Length	Broadcast date(s)	Release
01	"Hang On To Yourself"	Bowie	2:50	23 May 1972; 25 Jul 1972	Bowie at the Beeb: 2-CD set (2000) Rock n Roll Star! Box Set Jun 24
02	"Ziggy Stardust"	Bowie	3:24	23 May 1972; 25 Jul 1972	Bowie at the Beeb: 2-CD set (2000) Rock n Roll Star! Box Set Jun 24
03	"White Light/White Heat"	Lou Reed	3:48	23 May 1972; 25 Jul 1972	Bowie at the Beeb: 2-CD set (2000) Rock n Roll Star! Box Set Jun 24
04	"Suffragette City"	Bowie	3:29	23 May 1972; 25 Jul 1972	Bowie at the Beeb: 2-CD set (2000) Rock n Roll Star! Box Set Jun 24
05	"Moonage Daydream"	Bowie	4:59	25 Jul 1972	Bowie at the Beeb: 2-CD set (2000) Rock n Roll Star! Box Set Jun 24

== Johnnie Walker Lunchtime Show: 22 May 1972 ==
Track	Title	Written by	Length	Broadcast date(s)	Release
01	"Starman"	Bowie	4:05	6–9 Jun 1972 (4 shows)	Bowie at the Beeb: 2-CD set (2000) Rock n Roll Star! Box Set Jun 24
02	"Space Oddity"	Bowie	4:17	(not broadcast)	Bowie at the Beeb: 2-CD set (2000) Rock n Roll Star! Box Set Jun 24
03	"Changes"	Bowie	3:30	(not broadcast)	Bowie at the Beeb: 2-CD set (2000) Rock n Roll Star! Box Set Jun 24
04	"Oh! You Pretty Things"	Bowie	2:58	5 Jun 1972	Bowie at the Beeb: 2-CD set (2000) Rock n Roll Star! Box Set Jun 24

== Sound Of The Seventies: 23 May 1972 ==
Track	Title	Written by	Length	Broadcast date(s)	Release
01	"Andy Warhol"	Bowie	3:15	19 Jun 1972	Bowie at the Beeb: 2-CD set (2000) Rock n Roll Star! Box Set Jun 24
02	"Lady Stardust"	Bowie	3:21	19 Jun 1972	Bowie at the Beeb: 2-CD set (2000) Rock n Roll Star! Box Set Jun 24
03	"White Light/White Heat"	Lou Reed	3:56	19 Jun 1972	Rock n Roll Star! Box Set Jun 24
04	"Rock 'n' Roll Suicide"	Bowie	3:09	19 Jun 1972	Bowie at the Beeb: 2-CD set (2000) Rock n Roll Star! Box Set Jun 24
