= Five Years (1969–1973) =

2015 box set by David Bowie

Box set by David Bowie
- Released: 25 September 2015
- Recorded: June 1969 – July 1973
- Genres: Folk rock; glam rock; hard rock
- Length: 524:58 (12 CDs / 13 LPs)
- Label: Parlophone
- Producer: Various

David Bowie chronology
Nothing Has Changed (2014)	Five Years (1969–1973) (2015)	Blackstar (2016)

David Bowie box set chronology
David Bowie (2007)	Five Years (1969–1973) (2015)	Who Can I Be Now? (1974–1976) (2016)

Professional ratings
Review scores
Source	Rating
AllMusic	4.5/5 stars
The Guardian	5/5 stars
The Irish Times	5/5 stars
Pitchfork	8.2/10
PopMatters	10/10

Five Years (1969–1973) is a box set by English singer-songwriter David Bowie, released in September 2015. The period of Bowie's career from 1969 to 1973 is summarised over twelve discs and thirteen LPs. Exclusive to the box sets is Re:Call 1, a new compilation of non-album singles, single versions and B-sides. The collection is the first in a series of box sets covering Bowie's entire career, and the only one released prior to his death in January 2016.

== Overview ==
It includes the albums David Bowie (more commonly known as Space Oddity), The Man Who Sold the World, Hunky Dory, The Rise and Fall of Ziggy Stardust and the Spiders from Mars, Aladdin Sane and the last Spiders album with Bowie, Pin Ups. The albums cover the five years of Bowie's rise to stardom, with the box set also including Live Santa Monica '72, the soundtrack album of the last Ziggy Stardust show (in its 2003 Tony Visconti mix) at the Hammersmith Odeon, and a 2003 Ken Scott stereo remix of Ziggy Stardust (previously available on the 2003 SACD edition and 2012 vinyl-and-DVD-Audio edition of the album).

The box set comes with a companion book featuring rarely seen photos, recording essays from producers Tony Visconti and Ken Scott, original press reviews and a short foreword by Ray Davies of the Kinks.

== Track listing ==
All songs included are written by David Bowie, except where noted.

=== David Bowie (a.k.a. Space Oddity, 2015 remaster) ===
Side one
No.	Title	Length
1.	"Space Oddity"	5:16
2.	"Unwashed and Somewhat Slightly Dazed" (includes the hidden track "Don't Sit Down")	6:52
3.	"Letter to Hermione"	2:36
4.	"Cygnet Committee"	9:39
Total length:		24:23

Side two
No.	Title	Length
5.	"Janine"	3:25
6.	"An Occasional Dream"	3:00
7.	"Wild Eyed Boy from Freecloud"	4:53
8.	"God Knows I'm Good"	3:22
9.	"Memory of a Free Festival"	7:10
Total length:		21:50 (46:13)

=== The Man Who Sold the World (2015 remaster) ===
Side one
No.	Title	Length
1.	"The Width of a Circle"	8:10
2.	"All the Madmen"	5:43
3.	"Black Country Rock"	3:36
4.	"After All"	4:00
Total length:		21:29

Side two
No.	Title	Length
5.	"Running Gun Blues"	3:15
6.	"Saviour Machine"	4:30
7.	"She Shook Me Cold"	4:17
8.	"The Man Who Sold the World"	4:01
9.	"The Supermen"	3:41
Total length:		19:44 (41:13)

=== Hunky Dory (2015 remaster) ===
Side one
No.	Title	Length
1.	"Changes"	3:37
2.	"Oh! You Pretty Things"	3:12
3.	"Eight Line Poem"	2:55
4.	"Life on Mars?"	3:55
5.	"Kooks"	2:53
6.	"Quicksand"	5:06
Total length:		21:38

Side two
No.	Title	Length
7.	"Fill Your Heart" (Biff Rose, Paul Williams)	3:10
8.	"Andy Warhol"	3:54
9.	"Song for Bob Dylan"	4:13
10.	"Queen Bitch"	3:20
11.	"The Bewlay Brothers"	5:29
Total length:		20:06 (41:44)

=== The Rise and Fall of Ziggy Stardust and the Spiders from Mars (2012 remaster) ===
Side one
No.	Title	Length
1.	"Five Years"	4:43
2.	"Soul Love"	3:34
3.	"Moonage Daydream"	4:40
4.	"Starman"	4:14
5.	"It Ain't Easy" (Ron Davies)	2:57
Total length:		20:08

Side two
No.	Title	Length
6.	"Lady Stardust"	3:21
7.	"Star"	2:47
8.	"Hang On to Yourself"	2:39
9.	"Ziggy Stardust"	3:13
10.	"Suffragette City"	3:28
11.	"Rock 'n' Roll Suicide"	2:58
Total length:		18:26 (38:34)

=== Aladdin Sane (2013 remaster) ===
Side one
No.	Title	Length
1.	"Watch That Man"	4:30
2.	"Aladdin Sane (1913-1938-197?)"	5:08
3.	"Drive-In Saturday"	4:37
4.	"Panic in Detroit"	4:28
5.	"Cracked Actor"	3:01
Total length:		21:44

Side two
No.	Title	Length
6.	"Time"	5:15
7.	"The Prettiest Star"	3:31
8.	"Let's Spend the Night Together" (Mick Jagger, Keith Richards)	3:10
9.	"The Jean Genie"	4:08
10.	"Lady Grinning Soul"	3:55
Total length:		19:59 (41:43)

=== Pin Ups (2015 remaster) ===
Side one
No.	Title	Writer(s)	Original Artist	Length
1.	"Rosalyn"	Jimmy Duncan, Bill Farley	Pretty Things	2:21
2.	"Here Comes the Night"	Bert Berns	Them	3:09
3.	"I Wish You Would"	Billy Boy Arnold	The Yardbirds	2:48
4.	"See Emily Play"	Syd Barrett	Pink Floyd	4:13
5.	"Everything's Alright"	Nicky Crouch, John Konrad, Simon Stavely, Stuart James, Keith Karlson	The Mojos	2:28
6.	"I Can't Explain"	Pete Townshend	The Who	2:15
Total length:				17:14

Side two
No.	Title	Writer(s)	Original Artist	Length
7.	"Friday on My Mind"	George Young, Harry Vanda	The Easybeats	2:56
8.	"Sorrow"	Bob Feldman, Jerry Goldstein, Richard Gottehrer	The Merseys	2:53
9.	"Don't Bring Me Down"	Johnnie Dee	Pretty Things	2:06
10.	"Shapes of Things"	Paul Samwell-Smith, Jim McCarty, Keith Relf	The Yardbirds	2:53
11.	"Anyway, Anyhow, Anywhere"	Roger Daltrey, Townshend	The Who	3:13
12.	"Where Have All the Good Times Gone"	Ray Davies	The Kinks	2:41
Total length:				16:42 (33:56)

=== Live Santa Monica '72 (2008 remaster) ===
Side one
No.	Title	Length
1.	"Introduction"	0:13
2.	"Hang On to Yourself"	2:46
3.	"Ziggy Stardust"	3:22
4.	"Changes"	3:27
5.	"The Supermen"	2:55
6.	"Life on Mars?"	3:27
Total length:		16:10

Side two
No.	Title	Writer(s)	Length
7.	"Five Years"		4:32
8.	"Space Oddity"		5:04
9.	"Andy Warhol"		3:49
10.	"My Death"	Eric Blau; Mort Shuman; Jacques Brel	5:50
Total length:			19:15

Side three
No.	Title	Length
1.	"The Width of a Circle"	10:43
2.	"Queen Bitch"	3:00
3.	"Moonage Daydream"	4:53
4.	"John, I'm Only Dancing"	3:16
Total length:		21:52

Side four
No.	Title	Writer(s)	Length
5.	"Waiting for the Man"	Lou Reed	5:44
6.	"The Jean Genie"		4:00
7.	"Suffragette City"		4:11
8.	"Rock 'n' Roll Suicide"		3:01
Total length:			16:56 (74:13)

- In the CD version of the album, all the tracks are contained on one disc.

=== Ziggy Stardust: The Motion Picture Soundtrack (2003 mix) ===
Side one
No.	Title	Length
1.	"Introduction" (incorporating Beethoven's Ninth Symphony arranged and performed by Wendy Carlos) (Ludwig van Beethoven)	1:06
2.	"Hang On to Yourself"	2:56
3.	"Ziggy Stardust"	3:19
4.	"Watch That Man"	4:14
5.	"Wild Eyed Boy from Freecloud"	3:15
6.	"All the Young Dudes"	1:38
7.	"Oh! You Pretty Things"	1:46
Total length:		18:14

Side two
No.	Title	Length
8.	"Moonage Daydream"	6:25
9.	"Changes"	3:36
10.	"Space Oddity"	5:05
11.	"My Death" (Blau, Shuman, Brel)	7:21
Total length:		22:27

Side three
No.	Title	Length
1.	"Introduction" (incorporating the William Tell Overture) (Gioacchino Rossini)	1:02
2.	"Cracked Actor"	3:04
3.	"Time"	5:31
4.	"The Width of a Circle"	15:45
Total length:		25:22

Side four
No.	Title	Writer(s)	Length
5.	"Let's Spend the Night Together"	Jagger; Richards	3:02
6.	"Suffragette City"		4:32
7.	"White Light/White Heat"	Reed	4:01
8.	"Farewell Speech"		0:39
9.	"Rock 'n' Roll Suicide"		5:17
Total length:			17:31 (83:34)

=== The Rise and Fall of Ziggy Stardust and the Spiders from Mars (2003 Ken Scott mix) ===
Side one
No.	Title	Length
1.	"Five Years"	4:43
2.	"Soul Love"	3:33
3.	"Moonage Daydream"	4:39
4.	"Starman"	4:10
5.	"It Ain't Easy" (Davies)	2:59
Total length:		20:04

Side two
No.	Title	Length
6.	"Lady Stardust"	3:21
7.	"Star"	2:46
8.	"Hang On to Yourself"	2:38
9.	"Ziggy Stardust"	3:13
10.	"Suffragette City"	3:25
11.	"Rock 'n' Roll Suicide"	2:58
Total length:		18:21 (38:25)

=== Re:Call 1 (remastered tracks) ===
Side one
No.	Title	Writer(s)	Length
1.	"Space Oddity" (original UK mono single edit)		4:42
2.	"Wild Eyed Boy from Freecloud" (original UK mono single version)		4:52
3.	"Ragazzo solo, ragazza sola" (Italian version of "Space Oddity")	Bowie; Mogol	5:06
4.	"The Prettiest Star" (original mono single version (with Marc Bolan on guitar))		3:13
5.	"Conversation Piece" (B-side to "The Prettiest Star")		3:07
Total length:			21:00

Side two
No.	Title	Length
6.	"Memory of a Free Festival (Part 1)"	4:03
7.	"Memory of a Free Festival (Part 2)"	3:34
8.	"All the Madmen" (mono single edit; previously unreleased)	3:15
9.	"Janine" (mono version)	3:23
10.	"Holy Holy" (original mono single version; only ever issued on original '71 Mercury single)	3:13
11.	"Moonage Daydream" (The Arnold Corns single version)	3:53
12.	"Hang On to Yourself" (The Arnold Corns single version)	2:52
Total length:		24:13

Side three
No.	Title	Length
1.	"Changes" (mono single version)	3:39
2.	"Andy Warhol" (mono single version)	3:07
3.	"Starman" (original single mix)	4:17
4.	"John, I'm Only Dancing" (original single version)	2:47
5.	"The Jean Genie" (original single mix)	4:08
6.	"Drive-In Saturday" (German single edit)	4:03
Total length:		22:01

Side four
No.	Title	Writer(s)	Length
7.	"Round and Round"	Chuck Berry	2:42
8.	"Time" (U.S. single edit)		3:43
9.	"John, I'm Only Dancing" (sax version)		2:45
10.	"Amsterdam"	Brel	3:27
11.	"Holy Holy" (Spiders version)		2:18
12.	"Velvet Goldmine" (B-side to the 1975 single reissue of "Space Oddity")		3:10
Total length:			18:05 (85:19)

== Charts ==
Chart (2015–16)	Peak position
Belgian Albums (Ultratop Flanders)	46
Belgian Albums (Ultratop Wallonia)	82
Dutch Albums (Album Top 100)	68
French Albums (SNEP)	156
German Albums (Offizielle Top 100)	63
Hungarian Albums (MAHASZ)	24
Italian Albums (FIMI)	100
UK Albums (Official Charts)	45
US Top Alternative Albums (Billboard)	23
US Top Rock Albums (Billboard)	23
