= The Hype (band) =

English band

Hype was a band formed by David Bowie in 1970. The band were originally titled 'The David Bowie Band' for their first gig on 22 February 1970 at the Roundhouse, London. The second Hype gig on 23 February at the Streatham Arms, London was performed under the name 'Harry the Butcher', for their third gig they were billed as 'David Bowie's New Electric Band' with the subtitle 'So New They Haven't Got A Name Yet'. They were billed to appear at the Fickle Pickle Club in Westcliff-on-Sea on Friday July 17 1970 as "Debut of David Bowie with Harry The Butcher".

Bowie eventually settled on the name 'Hype'. "A phone call sparked a discussion over what to call themselves, with a chance remark – “The whole thing is just one big hype” – providing a name that seemed to suit". The band has been credited with helping to form the glam rock scene in the 1970s. The band was also the debut for Mick Ronson when they played at the Roundhouse supporting Noel Redding's Fat Mattress on 22 February 1970.

Their first performance was badly received, the band was laughed and jeered at as they left the stage.

Members included:

- David Bowie, alias Space Star/Rainbowman - vocals, 12-string guitar
- Mick Ronson, alias Gangsterman - Les Paul guitar
- Tony Visconti, alias Hypeman - bass guitar, vocals
- John Cambridge, alias Cowboyman - drums (until April 1970)
- Mick 'Woody' Woodmansey - drums (from April 1970)
- Benny Marshall - vocals, harmonica (from November 1970)

In February 1970, David Bowie required a more permanent band to back him for the promotion of his latest album, David Bowie. John Cambridge was retained from the "Space Oddity" recording session and Tony Visconti volunteered for bass guitar duty. Cambridge recommended his friend Mick Ronson as guitarist.

On 5 February 1970, on John Peel's The Sunday Show on BBC Radio 1, Hype made their on-air debut radio broadcast, after a short Bowie solo spot, an embryonic "The Width of a Circle," followed by "Janine," "Wild Eyed Boy from Freecloud," "Unwashed and Somewhat Slightly Dazed," "Fill Your Heart," "I'm Waiting for the Man," "The Prettiest Star," "Cygnet Committee," and "Memory of a Free Festival." Later that month, Hype signed to Mercury Records.
