= Changes (David Bowie song) =

1971 song by David Bowie

- Cover of the French single

Single by David Bowie

from the album Hunky Dory
- B-side: "Andy Warhol"
- Released: 7 January 1972
- Recorded: 30 July 1971
- Studio: Trident, London
- Genre: Art pop
- Length: 3:33
- Label: RCA
- Songwriter: David Bowie
- Producers: Ken Scott; David Bowie

David Bowie singles chronology
"Holy Holy" (1971)	"Changes" (1972)	"Starman" (1972)

Lyric video
- "Changes" on YouTube

"Changes" is a song by the English musician David Bowie from his 1971 album Hunky Dory. RCA Records then released it as a single from the album on 7 January 1972. Written following his promotional tour of America in early 1971, "Changes" was recorded at Trident Studios in London in July that year. Co-produced by Bowie and Ken Scott, it featured Rick Wakeman on piano and the musicians who would later become known as the Spiders from Mars: Mick Ronson, Trevor Bolder and Mick Woodmansey.

At this point in his career, Bowie had experimented with numerous musical styles, all of which failed to earn him stardom. The lyrics of "Changes" reflect this, with the first verse focusing on the compulsive nature of artistic reinvention and distancing oneself from the rock mainstream. The second verse concerns clashes between children and their parents, urging them to allow their children to be themselves as teenagers, a topic Bowie had spoken out about before. Musically, "Changes" is an art pop song that features a distinctive piano riff. The song flopped as a single, later garnering success following the release of Ziggy Stardust. RCA later chose it as a B-side for the reissue of "Space Oddity" in 1975, which became Bowie's first UK number-one single.

"Changes" is regarded as one of Bowie's best songs, with many praising Bowie's vocal performance and Wakeman's piano playing. It has also appeared on several best-of lists. His biographers have viewed the track as a manifesto of his entire career, predicting a constant change of musical styles. Bowie performed "Changes" frequently during his concert tours; it was the final song he performed on stage before his death in 2016. The song has appeared on numerous compilation albums and is the namesake of several. Several artists have covered the song, including Australian singer Butterfly Boucher for the soundtrack of the 2004 film Shrek 2, whose version featured new vocals from Bowie.

== Writing and recording ==
After completing a promotional tour of America in early 1971, David Bowie returned to his home at Haddon Hall in Beckenham, London, and began writing songs. In total, Bowie composed over three-dozen songs there, many of which would appear on his next album Hunky Dory and its follow-up The Rise and Fall of Ziggy Stardust and the Spiders from Mars. One of these tracks was "Changes", which he demoed in June 1971. Featuring Bowie on vocals and piano, the multitracked demo contained different lyrics from the final recording and remained unreleased until 2022, when it was included on the multi-disc box set Divine Symmetry: The Journey to Hunky Dory.

Work on Hunky Dory officially began at Trident Studios in London on 8 June 1971 and concluded on 6 August. "Changes" was recorded on 30 July. Co-produced by Bowie and Ken Scott, he recorded it with pianist Rick Wakeman and the musicians who would later become known as the Spiders from Mars—Mick Ronson (guitar), Trevor Bolder (bass) and Mick Woodmansey (drums). Wakeman, a noted session musician and member of the Strawbs, played piano, having previously played Mellotron on Bowie's Space Oddity. He recalled in 1995 that he met with Bowie in late June 1971 at Haddon Hall, where Bowie played him demos of "Changes" and "Life on Mars?" in "their raw brilliance". He recalled: "He [played] the finest selection of songs I have ever heard in one sitting in my entire life...I couldn't wait to get into the studio and record them." Bowie plays a saxophone solo on the final recording – his first feature of the instrument– which he recollected was recorded "when I was still going through ideas of using melodic saxophone." Bowie has said that the track "started out as a parody of a nightclub song, a kind of throwaway".

== Composition ==
=== Music ===
Musically, "Changes" is an art pop song. While primarily in 4/4 common time, the time signature changes to 2/4 twice (on the lines "different man" and "necks in it"), and four simultaneous bars of 3/4 feature different chords on each bar and are accompanied by Woodmansey's drum fills. According to James Perone, it features a "standard British pop song structure", with "clearly defined" verses, choruses and middle-eight sections. The song begins on a tonic chord (C major 7th) piano and strings, thereafter moving up in semitones: D♭add6th, D minor7, E♭7, F7. The critic Wilfrid Mellers described this intro as "near-anarchic", finding that the sequence "violates orthodox musical grammar". From there, the piano follows the same sequence: C–E–G–B (Cmaj7), D–F–A–C (Dm7), F–A–C–E (Fmaj7), and E♭–G–B♭–D♭ (E♭7). Chris O'Leary calls the progression "quintessential Bowie": it was "found by random movement, that sounded 'right' despite being technically 'wrong'."

After an "oh yeah" from Bowie, piano and kick drum eighth notes build anticipation before a distinctive riff begins. According to the author Peter Doggett, Bowie did not know the chord changes on guitar or piano, but "he followed his fingers as they crept, slowly up and down the keyboard, augmenting familiar shapes or simply reproducing them a step or two along the ivories." Played by piano, saxophone, bass and strings, the riff is an eighth note melody that Doggett describes as a rising "diatonic major descent". O'Leary notes that the riff only appears twice in the entire song: once before the first verse and second after the first chorus.

The piano and bass are similar to the album track "Oh! You Pretty Things", going up and down a C to D scale. Doggett writes: "It was as if the piano was scared to rest in one place for more than a couple of beats, in case it would be hemmed in or halted. By restlessly moving, it kept its options open and its spirit alive." Like "Oh! You Pretty Things", "Changes" ends how it begins: on the C major 7th chord, although the chord sequence is in reverse. Saxophone, piano, strings and bass all play their final notes, fading into the distance.

=== Lyrics ===
The chorus of "Changes"
The chorus of "Changes" features Bowie stuttering the 'ch' at the beginning of the word 'changes'. The piano-led track widely differs from the music found in Bowie's previous works.

The lyrics of "Changes" focus on the compulsive nature of artistic reinvention and distancing oneself from the rock mainstream. The author James E. Perone calls them "thought-provoking," and "clearly autobiographical." At this point in his career, Bowie was frequently being told how to musically progress by his managers and labels, leading him to experiment with genres such as folk, hard rock and soul. This is reflected in the first verse, in which the narrator looks at himself through a mirror to help find his true identity. Perone argues that the verse serves as a "public acknowledgment" that these earlier styles, all of which failed to earn him stardom, were not the "true David Bowie style." The biographer Nicholas Pegg identifies the line "I turned myself to face me" as mirroring Bowie's encounter with himself in his 1970 track "The Width of a Circle". O'Leary writes that with "Changes", Bowie commits to a "life of constant revision." By saying "look out you rock 'n' rollers", Bowie is "throwing the gauntlet down to existing rockers" and "putting a distance between himself and the rock fraternity."

Like "Life on Mars?", "Changes" was a response to Frank Sinatra's "My Way"; the biographer David Buckley cites the line "turn and face the strange" as "not a valedictory farewell, but a prophetic hello." According to Buckley, the phrase 'strange fascination' "not only embodies a continued quest for the new and the bizarre but also carries with it the force of compulsion, the notion of having to change to stay afloat artistically." The first verse elucidates the three most important components in Bowie's quest for stardom: the themes of identity, the "mutability" of character" and a "sense of play" in both first and third person, signaling the creation of Ziggy Stardust. Throughout the 1970s, Bowie had a "pathological fear" of repeating himself, both musically and visually. He gave himself the epithet 'faker' and proclaimed himself as "pop's fraud; the arch-dissembler." Pegg states that his identification of himself as the 'faker' gives him anxiety, believing that he is "much too fast" to be affected by how others' opinion of him.

The song's chorus, Bowie stuttering the 'ch' at the beginning of the word 'changes', has been compared to the English rock band the Who, specifically their 1965 song "My Generation". Both songs have stuttering vocals and similar lyrics ("hope I die before I get old" versus "pretty soon now you're gonna get older"). The second verse concerns clashes between children and their parents, urging them to allow their children to be themselves as teenagers. This is reflected in the line "Time may change me, but I can't trace time", which Pegg believes resembles Bob Dylan's "The Times They Are a-Changin'". Bowie had previously spoken about this issue in an interview with The Times in 1968: "We feel our parents' generation has lost control, given up, they're scared of the future. I feel it's basically their fault that things are so bad." In Rolling Stone's contemporary review of Hunky Dory, John Mendelsohn acknowledged this, considering "Changes" to be "construed as a young man's attempt to reckon how he'll react when it's his time to be on the maligned side of the generation schism." The song has also been interpreted by the NME editors Roy Carr and Charles Shaar Murray as touting "Modern Kids as a New Race".

== Release ==
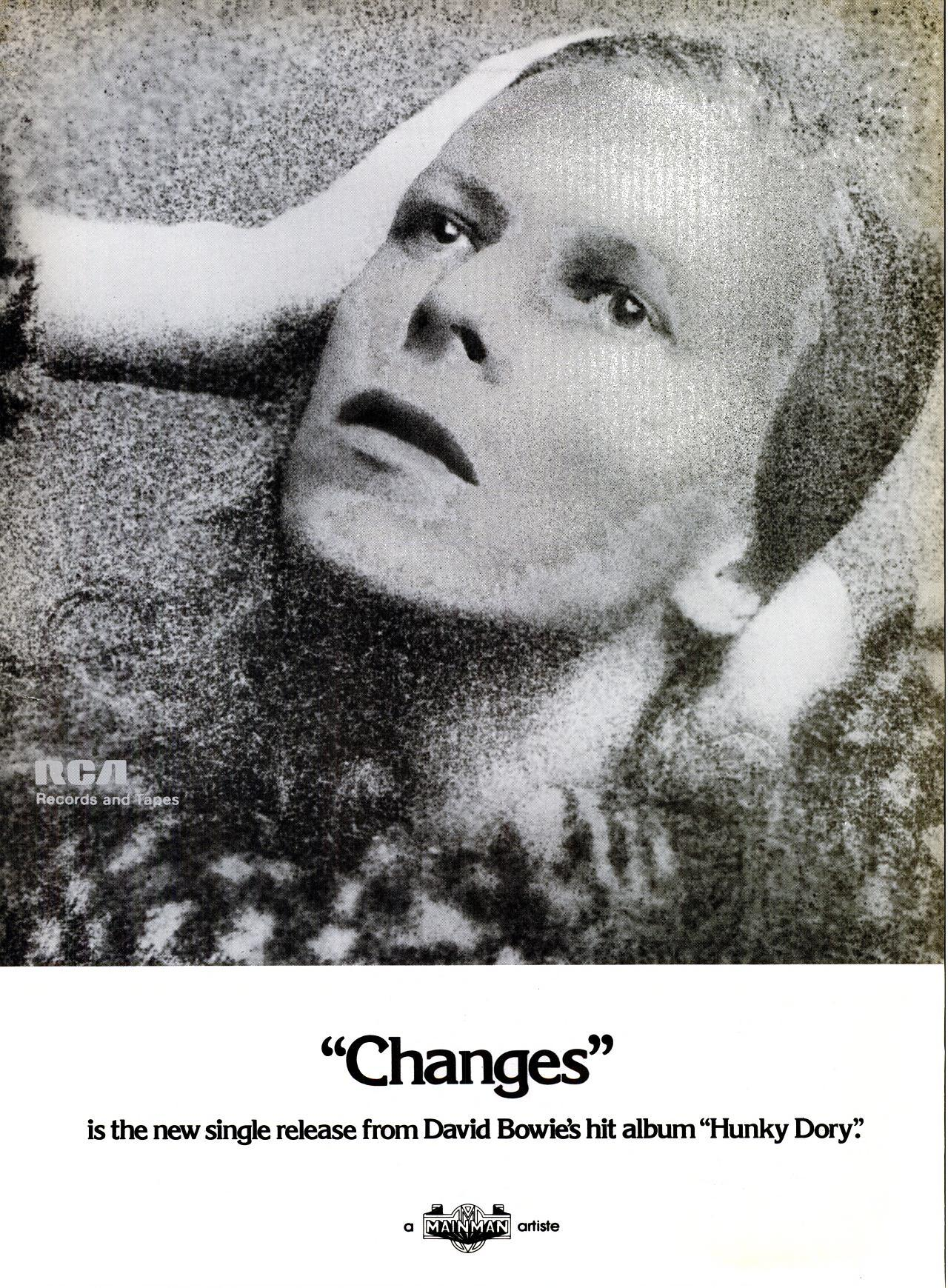
RCA trade ad for the "Changes" single in Billboard magazine

RCA Records released Hunky Dory on 17 December 1971, with "Changes" sequenced as the opening track. It was released as the first single of the album on 7 January 1972, with the catalogue number RCA 2160 and fellow album track "Andy Warhol" as the B-side; it was Bowie's first single released by RCA. In France, the B-side was "Song for Bob Dylan", despite the label stating that it was "Andy Warhol". This single has been cited as Bowie's official US chart debut.

Upon release, like the album, it flopped commercially, failing to chart in the UK, and peaking at number 59 and 66 on the US Cash Box Top 100 and Billboard Hot 100 charts, respectively. Despite this, it became English disc jockey Tony Blackburn's record of the week. It was not until the success of Bowie's following album The Rise and Fall of Ziggy Stardust and the Spiders from Mars (1972) that recognition was brought upon Hunky Dory and "Changes", which according to Pegg quickly became a "turntable favorite" and "embedded" itself into the "pop-culture psyche". Carr and Murray later argued that "Oh! You Pretty Things" was the "obvious single" from the album over "Changes".

In 1975, RCA released "Changes", along with the Ziggy Stardust outtake "Velvet Goldmine", as a B-side of the UK reissue of "Space Oddity", which became Bowie's first UK number one single. The re-release of the original one also charted higher in the US, at number 38 and 41 on the Cash Box Top 100 and Billboard Hot 100, respectively, and also peaked at number 32 on the Canadian RPM Top Singles chart. Following Bowie's death in 2016, it charted again, peaking at number 49 on the UK Singles Chart, and number 10 on the US Billboard Rock Songs chart. It also reached the top-five in Sweden and number 84 in France. In February 2025, the British Phonographic Industry (BPI) awarded the song a platinum certification for sales and streams exceeding 600,000 units.

== Critical reception ==
"Changes" was met with positive reviews from music critics on release, with Billboard magazine naming it one of the strongest songs on the album. Cash Box said that it has "one of the most infectious chorus lines in recent memory." Record World called it "an appealing slice of [Bowie's] unique musical outlook" that is "different, but adaptable both pop and progressive." Reviewing Hunky Dory, Danny Halloway of NME called "Changes" a "fantastic pop song", describing it as Bowie's "life story". In another review in Rolling Stone, John Mendelsohn called the song's chorus "irresistible". Retrospectively, "Changes" has continued to be viewed in a positive light. In his book The Complete David Bowie, Pegg calls Wakeman's piano performance "superb" and the song overall one of Bowie's "pivotal recordings". The author Paul Trynka writes that even though the song was not a commercial success initially, it would "energize a group of believers, who helped their golden boy ascend to fame over the months that followed." Ned Raggett of AllMusic calls the chorus "absolutely wonderful" and compliments Wakeman's piano, Bowie's vocal performance and the performances of the Spiders from Mars. He concludes saying: "The descending chords of the bass hint at that particular glam rock element's incipient dominance, while Ken Scott's production and Mick Ronson's excellent string arrangement – not to mention Bowie's own winning sax part – complete the package."

"Changes" has frequently appeared on lists of Bowie's greatest songs. Mojo magazine listed it as Bowie's fifth best track in 2015. Ultimate Classic Rock, in their list of Bowie's ten best songs the same year, listed it at number two, calling it "a beautiful tune" and praising Bowie's vocal performance as one of his finest, "showcasing one of the most unique voices in rock history." The staff of Rolling Stone listed "Changes" as one of Bowie's 30 essential songs, writing that although Bowie said it started as somewhat of a "parody of a nightclub song", it ended up being a "st-st-st-stuttering rock anthem". In The Guardian, Alexis Petridis voted it number 15 in his list of Bowie's 50 greatest songs in 2020, calling it a "perfectly written, irresistible mission statement that few heeded at the time." In other lists, "Changes" has ranked at number three, eight and nine by NME, Uncut and Smooth Radio in 2018, 2015 and 2020, respectively. In another 2016 list ranking every Bowie single from worst to best, Ultimate Classic Rock placed "Changes" at number two, behind "'Heroes'", calling it "a pre-'Ziggy' burst of pop exuberance that still shines".

=== Accolades ===
"Changes" has appeared on numerous best-of lists. In 2015, Ultimate Classic Rock placed the song on their list of the top 200 songs of the 1970s, writing, "Even before his career took off, Bowie was giving a glimpse of his future, singing about change in a voice that sounded an awful lot like a certain rock 'n' roll troubadour from Mars. After a few stumbling years, Bowie found his voice on 1971's Hunky Dory. "Changes" is his coming-out party." The song was ranked at number 128 on Rolling Stone magazine's list of the 500 Greatest Songs of All Time in 2010; it was re-ranked number 200 in its 2021 revised list. It is one of four of Bowie's songs to be included in the Rock and Roll Hall of Fame's 500 Songs that Shaped Rock and Roll. In late 2016, the American Recording Academy inducted the song into the Grammy Hall of Fame.

== Analysis ==
Retrospectively, "Changes" is described by Bowie's biographers as a manifesto of his entire career. Throughout the 1970s, Bowie changed his musical styles and appearances constantly; Doggett notes that each album he released between 1974 and 1977—Diamond Dogs, Young Americans, Station to Station and Low—could not have predicted the next. He was dubbed the "chameleon of rock" by numerous publications and biographers due to his constant reinvention throughout his career, which matches the overall theme in "Changes". Buckley notes that 1971 was a pivotal year for Bowie; it was the year in which he became "something of a pop-art agent provocateur. In a time when rock musicians looked to traditions and established standards, Bowie looked to be radically different and challenge tradition, reinventing himself again and again, thereby creating new standards and conventions. Doggett also notes that "Changes" is a "statement of purpose": it was the first track on Hunky Dory, the first time his audience had heard of him since The Man Who Sold the World (1970), and his previous hard rock and metallic sound was not present. Furthermore, he states that the song was unlike "Space Oddity" and its parent album, but rather "pure, unashamedly melodic, gleefully commercial, gorgeously mellifluous pop."

== Live versions ==
Bowie played the song for the BBC's Johnny Walker Lunchtime Show on 22 May 1972. This was broadcast in early June 1972 and eventually released on Bowie at the Beeb in 2000. Bowie frequently performed "Changes" throughout his concert tours. According to the artist, "it turned into this monster that nobody would stop asking for at concerts: 'Dye-vid, Dye-vid – do Changes!' I had no idea it would become such a popular thing." Performances from the Ziggy Stardust Tour have been released on Ziggy Stardust: The Motion Picture (1983) and Live Santa Monica '72 (2008). Another previously unreleased performance from Boston Music Hall on 1 October 1972 was released in 1989 on the original Sound + Vision Plus box set and on the 2003 reissue of his 1973 album Aladdin Sane.

Performances from the Diamond Dogs Tour have been released on David Live (1974), Cracked Actor (Live Los Angeles '74) (2017), and I'm Only Dancing (The Soul Tour 74) (2020). Live versions from the 1976 Isolar Tour, the Glastonbury Festival and the Reality tour were released on Live Nassau Coliseum '76, Glastonbury 2000 (2018) and A Reality Tour (2010), respectively. A performance from the Montreux Jazz Festival on 18 July 2002 was released on the box set I Can't Give Everything Away (2002–2016) in 2025. On 9 November 2006, Bowie performed the song with the American singer Alicia Keys at the Black Ball fundraiser in New York. Also performing "Wild Is the Wind" and "Fantastic Voyage", it was Bowie's final live performance before his death in 2016.

== Legacy ==
"Changes" has appeared on multiple compilation albums, including Changesonebowie (1976), Changesbowie (1990) (its namesakes, along with 1981's Changestwobowie), The Best of David Bowie 1969/1974 (1997), Best of Bowie (2002), Nothing Has Changed (2014) and Legacy (2016). In 2015, the song, along with its parent album, was remastered for the Five Years (1969–1973) box set. It was released in CD, vinyl, and digital formats.

A quotation from the song was used as an epigraph for the John Hughes film The Breakfast Club (1985):

...And these children
that you spit on
as they try to change their worlds
are immune to your consultations.
They're quite aware
Of what they're going through...

The song also appears in the 2015 Off-Broadway musical Lazarus, written by Bowie and the playwright Enda Walsh near the end of Bowie's life. The English pop group Bananarama recorded a version of "Changes" in 1993 with the producers Mike Stock and Pete Waterman. Although officially unreleased, their version was leaked to the internet in 2016. That same year, the song was ranked at number 74 by internet radio station WDDF Radio in their first top 76 of the 1970s countdown.

In 2004, a new version of "Changes" by the Australian artist Butterfly Boucher, featuring Bowie on additional vocals, was recorded for the soundtrack of the animated film Shrek 2. Boucher, who was commissioned by the film's studio to provide a song, sent a recording of "Changes" to Bowie in December 2003 during his A Reality Tour, requesting additional backing vocals from the artist. In the Bahamas for the tour, Bowie travelled to Compass Point Studios, where he had previously recorded with the rock band Tin Machine, where he recorded a harmony vocal against Boucher's lead with Tony Visconti producing. Pegg describes this version as having a "lush arrangement" featuring piano, saxophone and strings. He and O'Leary both praise Bowie's vocal performance as one of the finest of his later career. That same year, the Brazilian singer Seu Jorge recorded a Portuguese version for the Wes Anderson film The Life Aquatic with Steve Zissou.

An alternative mix of "Changes" by Ken Scott was released in December 2021 to celebrate the 50th anniversary of Hunky Dory, accompanied by a new lyric video. Scott explained in a statement:

The new version of 'Changes' is a fresh look at David's classic. When listening to the original multi-track I discovered a few things that I had eliminated from the original mix and also a completely different sax solo at the end. It was those things that led me to try a new mix, trying for a slightly harder, more contemporary edge to it.

The 2021 remix was also included on the 2022 box set Divine Symmetry: The Journey to Hunky Dory.

== Personnel ==
According to biographers Kevin Cann and Chris O'Leary:

- David Bowie – lead vocal, alto and tenor saxophone
- Mick Ronson – guitar, string arrangement, backing vocal
- Trevor Bolder – bass guitar
- Mick Woodmansey – drums
- Rick Wakeman – piano
- Unknown musicians – violins, violas, cellos

Production

- David Bowie – producer
- Ken Scott – producer, engineer

== Charts ==
Weekly chart performance for "Changes"
Year	Chart	Peak position
1972	US Billboard Hot 100	66
1972	US Cash Box Top 100	59
1975	Canada RPM Top Singles	32
1975	US Billboard Hot 100	41
1975	US Cash Box Top 100	38
2016	France (SNEP)	84
2016	Ireland (IRMA)	66
2016	Sweden Heatseeker (Sverigetopplistan)	4
2016	UK Singles Chart	49
2016	US Billboard Rock Songs	10

== Certifications ==
Certifications and sales for "Changes"
Region	Certification	Certified units/sales
New Zealand (RMNZ)	Platinum	30,000^{‡}
United Kingdom (BPI)	Platinum	600,000^{‡}
^{‡} Sales+streaming figures based on certification alone.
