= Oh! You Pretty Things =

1971 song by David Bowie

Song by David Bowie

from the album Hunky Dory
- Released: 17 December 1971
- Recorded: 21 June–late July 1971
- Studio: Trident, London
- Genre: Pop
- Length: 3:12
- Label: RCA
- Songwriter: David Bowie
- Producers: Ken Scott; David Bowie

Official audio
- "Oh! You Pretty Things" (2015 Remaster) on YouTube

"Oh! You Pretty Things" is a song by the English singer-songwriter David Bowie from his 1971 album Hunky Dory. Bowie recorded the song as a demo before giving it to the singer Peter Noone of Herman's Hermits, who released it as his debut solo single in April 1971 under the title "Oh You Pretty Thing". Noone's recording featured structural and lyrical differences from Bowie's later version. The single peaked at number 12 in the UK, becoming Bowie's biggest success as a songwriter since his own single "Space Oddity" two years earlier.

Bowie recorded his own version during the sessions for Hunky Dory between June and July 1971. Co-produced by Bowie and Ken Scott, it featured the musicians who would later become known as the Spiders from Mars: Mick Ronson (guitar), Trevor Bolder (bass) and Mick Woodmansey (drums). Similar to other tracks on the album, the themes of "Oh! You Pretty Things" are dark, reflecting ideals of the occultist Aleister Crowley and the philosopher Friedrich Nietzsche, while making literary references to Arthur C. Clarke's 1953 novel Childhood's End and Edward Bulwer-Lytton's 1871 novel The Coming Race.

"Oh! You Pretty Things" is considered by music critics to be one of the best songs on Hunky Dory and by some publications as one of Bowie's best songs. Bowie performed the track multiple times for BBC radio programmes between 1971 and 1972 and once on the Ziggy Stardust Tour in 1973. Bowie's version has appeared on numerous compilation albums, while Noone's was included on a 2006 compilation named after the track. Other covers have been recorded by Seu Jorge, Au Revoir Simone and Lisa Hannigan.

== Writing ==
"Oh! You Pretty Things" was the first song Bowie wrote for Hunky Dory. The song came to him in the early hours of a morning in January 1971. He recalled: "I couldn't sleep ... this song was going 'round in my head. I had to get out of bed and just play it ... so that I could get back to sleep again." (Note: Trynka comments on similarities in the composition of "Yesterday" by Paul McCartney and "Satisfaction" by Keith Richards in that, like "Oh! You Pretty Things", these songs came to their respective writers in dreams.) He requested studio time from his music publisher Chrysalis, whose partner Bob Grace booked time at London's Radio Luxembourg Studios to record a solo demo. Bowie recorded the demo sometime between February and March 1971. According to Paul Trynka, the demo contains only piano and "the jangling of the bracelets he was wearing". Bowie's demos of "Oh! You Pretty Things" and other Hunky Dory tracks "Life on Mars?" and "Andy Warhol" inspired Bowie's new manager, Tony Defries, to look into securing a new record contract for Bowie, eventually signing him with RCA Records.

After recording the demo, Bowie gave the tape to Grace, who showed it to the producer Mickie Most, a well-known independent producer in the UK at the time. He chose Most due to his popularity, having produced numerous hits for bands such as the Animals and Herman's Hermits, telling Record Collector magazine years later: "The most sure-fire way of getting a hit in those days was if you got Mickie Most to produce your song." Most liked the song and contacted Herman's Hermits' singer Peter Noone, who believed the song would be Noone's first solo hit. Noone recalled, "[Most] only played the intro and I said, 'That's it, it's perfect!'"

=== Peter Noone's version ===
"Oh You Pretty Thing"

Single by Peter Noone
- A-side: "Together Forever" (double A-side)
- Released: 30 April 1971 / August 1971 (U.S.)
- Recorded: 26 March 1971
- Studio: Kingsway, London
- Label: RAK
- Songwriter: David Bowie
- Producer: Mickie Most

Peter Noone singles chronology
"Oh You Pretty Thing" / "Together Forever" (1971)	"Walnut Whirl" (1971)

Noone's version of "Oh! You Pretty Things", titled "Oh You Pretty Thing", (Note: It is unknown why Noone's version was titled singularly, as Noone sings in the plural.) was recorded at London's Kingsway Studios on 26 March 1971. With Most producing, the lineup consisted of Noone on lead vocals, Bowie on piano and backing vocals, session player Clem Cattini on drums and Herbie Flowers on bass. (Note: Flowers had previously worked with Bowie on his 1969 self-titled album.) According to Noone, Bowie struggled with the piano part: "David had some trouble playing it through completely, so we recorded it in three sections, something Mickie Most helped arrange." Most also used acoustic guitar on the recording; according to the biographer Chris O'Leary, this was "to help the chord changes fall easier on the ear". He also states that Noone's version is "bookended by refrains". Trynka states that it features a "lumpy, pedestrian arrangement" that "failed to hamper" the song's melody. To avoid being banned from radio stations, the line "the Earth is a bitch" was changed with "the Earth is a beast". The NME editors Roy Carr and Charles Shaar Murray opined the change to be "one of rock and roll's most outstanding examples of a singer failing to achieve any degree of empathy whatsoever with the mood and content of a lyric."

"Oh You Pretty Thing" was released as a double A-side with the Daniel Vangarde/Josh Fishmann song "Together Forever" on 30 April 1971 by Most's RAK Records label. The single was a commercial success, peaking at number 12 on the UK Singles Chart in May and at number 100 in Australia. In addition to being Bowie's biggest success since "Space Oddity" two years earlier, it was the first time most listeners had heard of Bowie since then. Noone told NME at the time: "My view is that David Bowie is the best writer in Britain at the moment ... certainly the best since [John] Lennon and [Paul] McCartney ... David Bowie has more than enough talent to write hit songs ... for just about any kind of singer." Bowie commented: "I don't know if Peter knows what [the song] means. It's all about Homo Superior. Herman goes heavy." He would perform the song with Noone on Britain's Top of the Pops on 9 June 1971.

== Recording ==
Work on Hunky Dory officially began at Trident Studios in London on 8 June 1971 and concluded on 6 August. Bowie's own version of "Oh! You Pretty Things" was recorded sometime between 21 June and late July, according to O'Leary. Kevin Cann writes that the song had been recorded by 26 July, as the finished track appeared on a promotional album compiled for Gem Productions.

Co-produced by Bowie and Ken Scott, it was recorded with the musicians who would later become known as the Spiders from Mars: guitarist Mick Ronson, bassist Trevor Bolder and drummer Mick Woodmansey; according to O'Leary, Ronson's only contributions was a cello arrangement and backing vocals. He also states that Bowie played piano on the track alone without Rick Wakeman, who played piano on the rest of the album. However, Wakeman contended in a 2017 BBC interview that Bowie played piano in the beginning section before he took over for the rest of the track.

== Composition ==
=== Lyrics ===
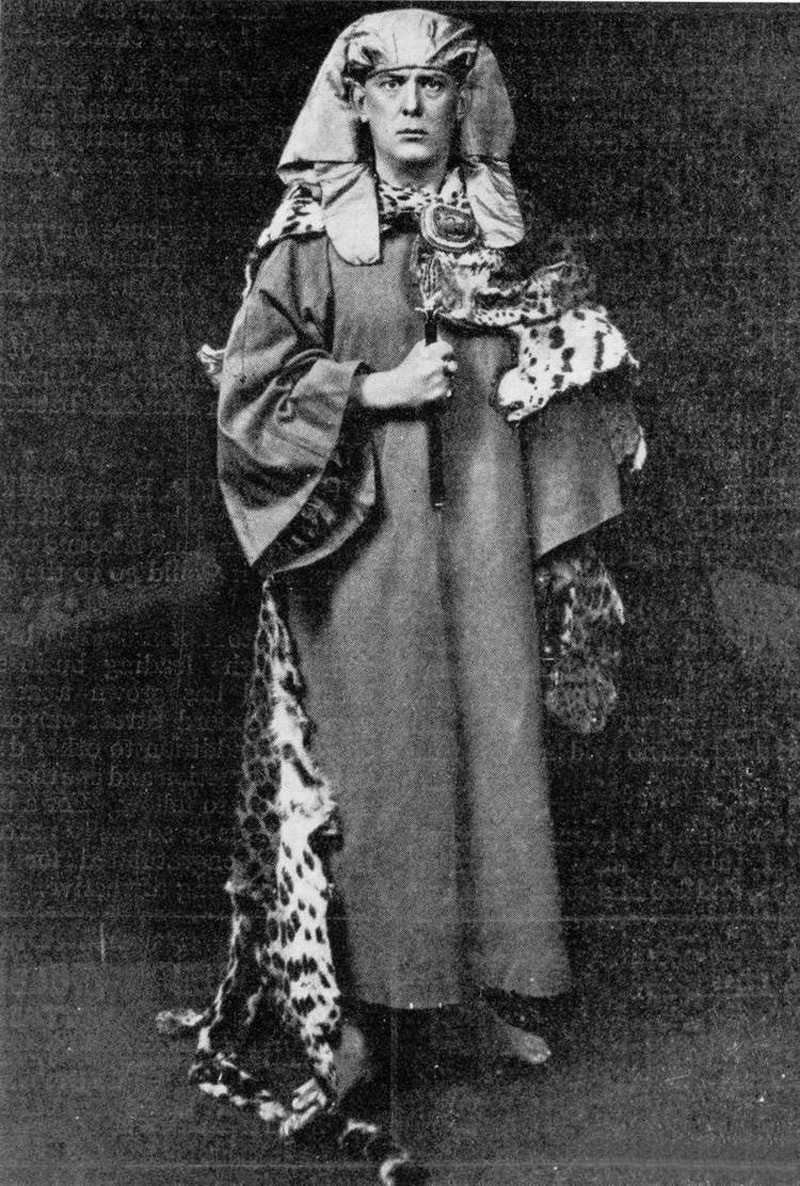
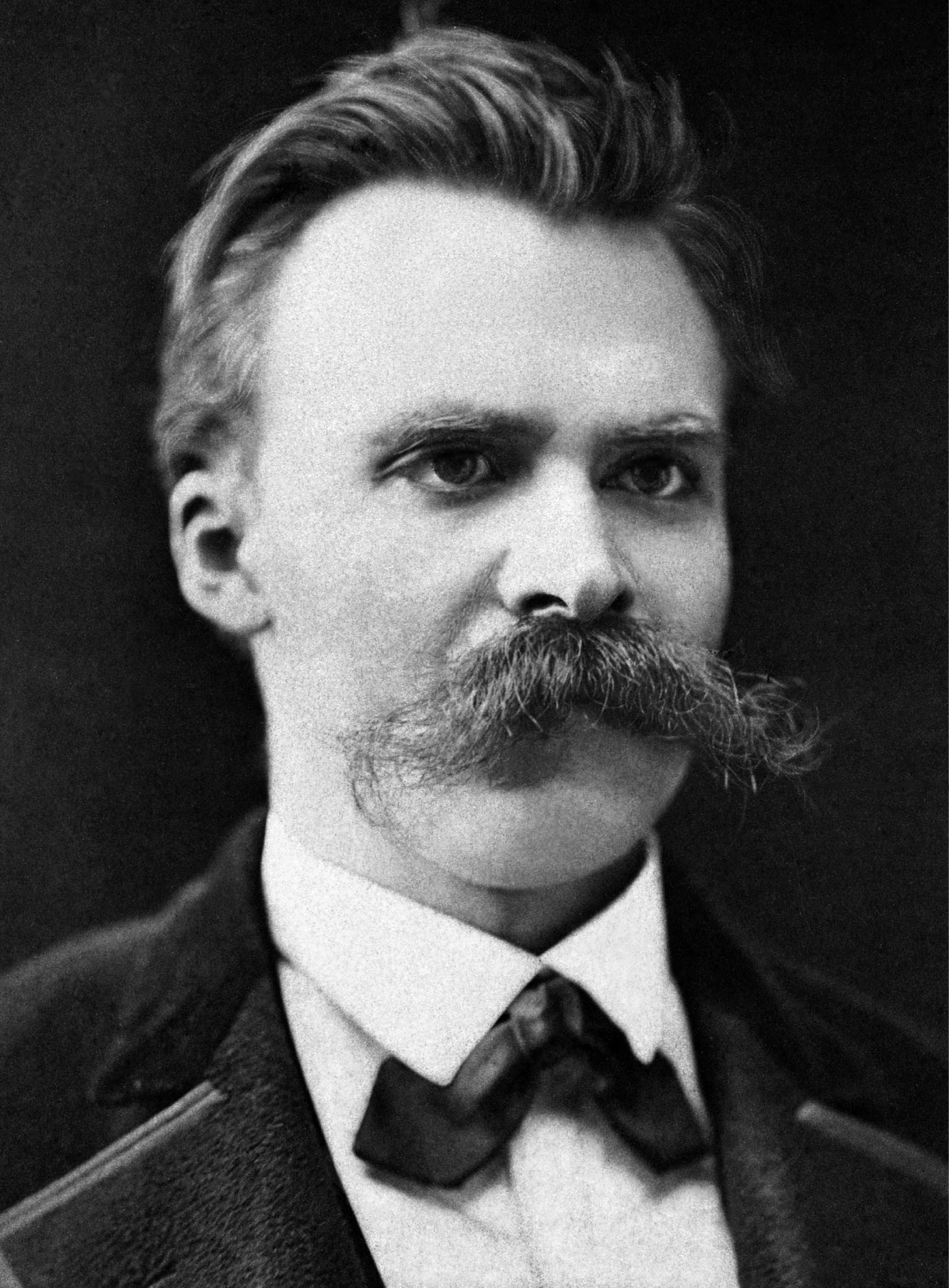
The lyrics of "Oh! You Pretty Things" reflect the teachings of Aleister Crowley (left) and Friedrich Nietzsche (right)

The lyrics of "Oh! You Pretty Things" concern the establishment of a master race that will take over the world. Bowie had explored a similar premise in the 1967 track "We Are Hungry Men". Like other tracks on Hunky Dory, particularly "Quicksand", the themes of "Oh! You Pretty Things" are dark, reflecting ideals of the occultist Aleister Crowley and his Golden Dawn, and philosopher Friedrich Nietzsche and his theory of Übermensch, or "Superman". Other songs Bowie had written during this period, including "The Supermen" from The Man Who Sold the World, reflect Nietzsche's theory of Übermensch. There is a "strong hint" of Arthur C. Clarke's 1953 science fiction novel Childhood's End and a direct reference to Edward Bulwer-Lytton's 1871 novel The Coming Race. Perone writes that the "pretty things" are not gender-specific, leading to possible homosexual interpretations.

In a January 1972 interview with Melody Maker Bowie explains that "we have created a new kind of person in a way. We have created a child who will be so exposed to the media that he will be lost to his parents by age 12". He adds "all the things we can't do they will". In 1976 Bowie said "a lot of the songs do in fact deal with some kind of schizophrenia, or alternating id problems, and 'Pretty Things' is one of them. Remarking on the 'crack in the sky' mentioned in the song Bowie said "According to Jung, to see cracks in the sky is not, is not really quite on. And I did, you know, the sky for me representing something solid that could be cracked and I still had a dome over the world which again I found out was just my own repressions".

Carr and Murray state that the lyrics herald "the impending obsolescence of the human race in favour of an alliance between arriving aliens and the youth of the present society." O'Leary states that the song contains "more acceptance than dread", with a blunt note being "the earth is a bitch". He comments on Bowie's indifferent delivery of the line "all the nightmares came today / And it looks as though they're here to stay", which he compares to Black Sabbath. In his analysis, the song praises the children that will replace us, but because they will suffer the same fate as us, there's no reason to fear the upcoming apocalypse. Pegg cites Biff Rose's 1968 song "Mama's Boy" from his The Thorn in Mrs. Rose's Side as a likely inspiration, stating that the lyric "But the kids are growing up as fine as can be / Members of a new society" "prefigures" the lyric for "Oh! You Pretty Things"; Bowie covered another song from that album, "Fill Your Heart", for Hunky Dory. The darker themes provide a contrast to the music itself.

=== Music ===
Musically, the song has been characterised as pop. The song contains a descending diatonic major progression that Bowie would use for fellow album track "Changes" and later "All the Young Dudes". It opens on piano in the key of F major. Its time signature starts in 2/4, before using a waltz bar (3/4) to transition to 4/4 common time. The simple piano style has been compared with the Beatles' 1968 track "Martha My Dear". The opening lyrics concern a man waking someone up for breakfast in the middle of what O'Leary describes as a "fresh, apocalyptic morning". Here, it transitions out of G major using B7 and D♯ chords. In the first verse, Bowie uses sudden shifts in tonality, from holding one note on the line "wake up you sleepyhead" to ranging across intervals: lowering on "put another log on the fire for me" (which goes from G to B) and rising on "and it looks as though they're here to stay". He hits an operatic high C on "Homo Superior". This line is the inspiration for the name of a group of young telepaths called the Homo Superior in Roger Price's 1973 The Tomorrow People. Price was a fan of Bowie and even interviewed him on one occasion.

Bowie compared the song's bassline in the refrain to the works of Paul McCartney. Doggett describes Bowie's vocal performance as "quite unadorned, presented so starkly ... that it [is] almost unsettling". It ends the same way it began: on piano. The album's following track, "Eight Line Poem", was designed to sound like a "continuation" of "Oh! You Pretty Things".

== Release and reception ==
RCA Records released Hunky Dory in the UK on 17 December 1971, with "Oh! You Pretty Things" sequenced as the second track on side one of the original LP, between "Changes" and "Eight Line Poem". Cann argues that the song's placement on Hunky Dory displayed Bowie's growing evolution as a songwriter. Although "Changes" was released as the first single from the album, some commentators argued that "Oh! You Pretty Things" was the better choice. In a contemporary review, Billboard named it as one of the strongest songs on the album. Retrospectively, Michael Gallucci of Ultimate Classic Rock also called it one of the best songs on the album, citing it as an example of showcasing Bowie's growth as a songwriter and proving he would become an unpredictable artist. Ned Raggett of AllMusic also considers it one of the best songs on the album and one of his best efforts in general. Some reviewers have called it a homosexual anthem.

"Oh! You Pretty Things" has been ranked by some publications as one of Bowie's best songs. In 2008, Uncut magazine ranked it number 19 in a list of Bowie's 30 best songs. In 2015, Mojo magazine considered it Bowie's 17th greatest song. The staff of NME placed it at number ten in a list of Bowie's 40 best songs in 2018. Two years later, Alexis Petridis of The Guardian voted it number eight in his list of Bowie's 50 greatest songs, describing it as one of Bowie's finest uses of an apocalyptic scenario up to that point and concluding: "[It is] a song that sets an incredibly bleak message to a melody so lovely it could be covered by the lead singer of Herman's Hermits."

== Live versions ==
Bowie recorded "Oh! You Pretty Things" three times for BBC radio programmes: on 3 June and 21 September 1971, and 22 May 1972 for In Concert: John Peel, Sounds of the 70s: Bob Harris, and The Johnnie Walker Lunchtime Show, respectively. The 3 June performance was cut from the show before broadcast and is now lost. The September recording, a duo performance between Bowie and Ronson, was released on the Japanese edition of the 2000 release Bowie at the Beeb and on the 2016 vinyl version of that album, while the May 1972 performance was released on the standard edition of Bowie at the Beeb.

A live version recorded at the Hammersmith Odeon in London on 3 July 1973 during the Ziggy Stardust Tour was released on the album Ziggy Stardust: The Motion Picture in 1983. It was performed as a medley with "Wild Eyed Boy from Freecloud" and "All the Young Dudes". It was also recorded on 8 February 1972 for the BBC's The Old Grey Whistle Test, though the performance was not broadcast until over ten years later. This performance is available on the Best of Bowie DVD. An outtake from the same session, in which Bowie stumbles over the lines and gets them wrong on several occasions, is hidden among easter eggs on the same DVD.

== Covers and subsequent releases ==
"Oh! You Pretty Things" has appeared on numerous compilation albums, including Changestwobowie (1981), The Singles Collection (1993), The Best of David Bowie 1969/1974 (1997), Best of Bowie (2002), The Platinum Collection (2006), Nothing Has Changed (2014), and Legacy (The Very Best of David Bowie) (2016). In 2015, the song, along with its parent album, was remastered for the Five Years (1969–1973) box set. It was released in CD, vinyl, and digital formats. Noone's version also appeared on the 2006 compilation Oh! You Pretty Things, named after the track.

Brazilian singer Seu Jorge recorded a Portuguese version of "Oh! You Pretty Things!" for the 2004 film The Life Aquatic with Steve Zissou, while Au Revoir Simone recorded it for the tribute compilation Life Beyond Mars. A 2017 cover by Lisa Hannigan appeared in an episode of the FX television series Legion.

== Personnel ==
According to biographer Chris O'Leary:

- David Bowie – lead vocals, piano, handclaps
- Mick Ronson – backing vocals, string arrangements, handclaps
- Trevor Bolder – bass guitar
- Mick Woodmansey – drums
- Rick Wakeman – piano
- Unknown musician – cello

Production

- David Bowie – producer
- Ken Scott – producer, engineer

== Charts ==
Weekly chart performance for Peter Noone's version
Chart (1971)	Peak position
Australia (Kent Music Report)	100
UK Singles Chart	12

== Certifications ==
Sales certifications for "Oh! You Pretty Things" (Bowie version)
Region	Certification	Certified units/sales
United Kingdom (BPI)	Silver	200,000^{‡}
^{‡} Sales+streaming figures based on certification alone.
