= Bowie at the Beeb =

Compilation album by David Bowie
- Released: 26 September 2000
- Recorded: 13 May 1968 – 23 May 1972, various BBC Radio studios, London; 27 June 2000, London (3 CD version)
- Genre: Rock
- Length: 141:18 (2 CD version); 215:31 (3 CD version)
- Label: EMI/Virgin
- Producers: Bernie Andrews, Paul Williams, Jeff Griffin, Pete Ritzema, John F. Muir, Roger Pusey

David Bowie chronology
Hours (1999)	Bowie at the Beeb (2000)	All Saints (2001)

David Bowie compilation chronology
The Best of David Bowie 1974/1979 (1998)	Bowie at the Beeb (2000)	All Saints (2001)

Professional ratings
Aggregate scores
Source	Rating
Metacritic	86/100
Review scores
Source	Rating
AllMusic	4.5/5 stars
The Encyclopedia of Popular Music	4/5 stars
Pitchfork	8.0/10
Q	4/5 stars
Record Collector	4/5 stars
Rolling Stone	3.5/5 stars
The Rolling Stone Album Guide	4/5 stars
Spin	3/5 stars
Uncut	8/10
Wall of Sound	90/100

Bowie at the Beeb is a compilation album by the English singer-songwriter David Bowie, first released in 2000. Originally, it came in a three-CD set, the third, bonus CD being a live recording made on 27 June 2000 at the Portland BBC Radio Theatre, part of his Mini Tour. Later editions contain only the first two CDs.

== Releases ==
The first pressing mistakenly included the second (disc 2, track 13) version of the song "Ziggy Stardust" twice on disc two, missing the first (disc 2, track 5) version. EMI declined to issue corrected replacement discs to customers, instead mailing out one-song CDs of the first version.

This compilation also features a previously unreleased song, "Looking for a Friend" (disc 1, track 15), which John Peel said would be released as a single by Arnold Corns. The single was later cancelled.

The live tracks recorded in June 2000, included in this set on the bonus disc, were re-mastered and re-released in 2021 in the box set Brilliant Adventure (1992–2001), and was also expanded to include the full live set list on 2 CDs; the original release was a single disc and represented an edited recording of the show.

== Track listing ==
All tracks are written by David Bowie except where noted.

Disc 1 (May 1968 - June 1971)
No.	Title	Writer(s)	Recording and Broadcast Details	Length
1.	"In the Heat of the Morning" (As "David Bowie and the Tony Visconti Orchestra")		Recorded 13/05/1968 for Top Gear; Broadcast 26/05/1968	3:01
2.	"London Bye Ta Ta" (As "David Bowie and the Tony Visconti Orchestra")		Recorded 13/05/1968 for Top Gear; Broadcast 26/05/1968	2:34
3.	"Karma Man" (As "David Bowie and the Tony Visconti Orchestra")		Recorded 13/05/1968 for Top Gear; Broadcast 26/05/1968	2:59
4.	"Silly Boy Blue" (As "David Bowie and the Tony Visconti Orchestra")		Recorded 13/05/1968 for Top Gear; Not broadcast.	4:36
5.	"Let Me Sleep Beside You" (As "David Bowie and Junior's Eyes")		Recorded 20/10/1969 for Dave Lee Travis Show; Cut from 26/10/1969 broadcast	3:16
6.	"Janine" (As "David Bowie and Junior's Eyes")		Recorded 20/10/1969 for Dave Lee Travis Show; Cut from 26/10/1969 broadcast	3:01
7.	"Amsterdam" (As "David Bowie and the Tony Visconti Trio")	Jacques Brel & Mort Shuman	Recorded 05/02/1970 for The Sunday Show; Broadcast 08/02/1970	2:56
8.	"God Knows I'm Good" (As "David Bowie and the Tony Visconti Trio")		Recorded 05/02/1970 for The Sunday Show; Broadcast 08/02/1970	3:10
9.	"The Width of a Circle" (As "David Bowie and the Tony Visconti Trio")		Recorded 05/02/1970 for The Sunday Show; Broadcast 08/02/1970	4:50
10.	"Unwashed and Somewhat Slightly Dazed" (As "David Bowie and the Tony Visconti Trio")		Recorded 05/02/1970 for The Sunday Show; Broadcast 08/02/1970	4:54
11.	"Cygnet Committee" (As "David Bowie and the Tony Visconti Trio")		Recorded 05/02/1970 for The Sunday Show; Broadcast 08/02/1970	8:16
12.	"Memory of a Free Festival" (As "David Bowie and the Tony Visconti Trio")		Recorded 05/02/1970 for The Sunday Show; Broadcast 08/02/1970	3:17
13.	"Wild Eyed Boy from Freecloud" (As "David Bowie and the Tony Visconti Trio")		Recorded 25/03/1970 for Sounds of the 70s Broadcast 06/04/1970	4:42
14.	"Bombers" (As "David Bowie and Friends")		Recorded 03/06/1971 for In Concert: John Peel; Broadcast 20/60/1971	2:53
15.	"Looking for a Friend" (As "David Bowie and Friends")		Recorded 03/06/1971 for In Concert: John Peel; Broadcast 20/60/1971	3:08
16.	"Almost Grown" (As "David Bowie and Friends")	Chuck Berry	Recorded 03/06/1971 for In Concert: John Peel; Broadcast 20/60/1971	2:16
17.	"Kooks" (As "David Bowie and Friends")		Recorded 03/06/1971 for In Concert: John Peel; Broadcast 20/60/1971	3:02
18.	"It Ain't Easy" (As "David Bowie and Friends")	Ron Davies	Recorded 03/06/1971 for In Concert: John Peel; Broadcast 20/60/1971	2:51

Disc Two (September 1971 - May 1972)
No.	Title	Writer(s)	Recording and Broadcast Details	Length
1.	"The Supermen" (With Mick Ronson)		Recorded 21/09/1971 for Sounds of the 70s Broadcast 04/10/1971	2:50
2.	"Eight Line Poem" (With Mick Ronson)		Recorded 21/09/1971 for Sounds of the 70s Broadcast 04/10/1971	2:52
3.	"Hang On to Yourself"		Recorded 18/01/1972 for Sounds of the 70s Broadcast 07/02/1972	2:48
4.	"Ziggy Stardust"		Recorded 18/01/1972 for Sounds of the 70s Broadcast 07/02/1972	3:23
5.	"Queen Bitch"		Recorded 18/01/1972 for Sounds of the 70s Broadcast 07/02/1972	2:57
6.	"I'm Waiting for the Man"	Lou Reed	Recorded 18/01/1972 for Sounds of the 70s Broadcast 07/02/1972	5:22
7.	"Five Years"		Recorded 18/01/1972 for Sounds of the 70s Broadcast 07/02/1972	4:21
8.	"White Light / White Heat"	Reed	Recorded 16/05/1972 for Sounds of the 70s Broadcast 23/05/1972	3:46
9.	"Moonage Daydream"		Recorded 16/05/1972 for Sounds of the 70s Broadcast 23/05/1972	4:58
10.	"Hang On to Yourself"		Recorded 16/05/1972 for Sounds of the 70s Broadcast 23/05/1972	2:48
11.	"Suffragette City"		Recorded 16/05/1972 for Sounds of the 70s Broadcast 23/05/1972	3:25
12.	"Ziggy Stardust"		Recorded 16/05/1972 for Sounds of the 70s Broadcast 23/05/1972	3:22
13.	"Starman"		Recorded 22/05/1972 for Johnnie Walker Lunchtime Show; Broadcast 05-09/06/1972	4:03
14.	"Space Oddity"		Recorded 22/05/1972 for Johnnie Walker Lunchtime Show; Broadcast 05-09/06/1972	4:13
15.	"Changes"		Recorded 22/05/1972 for Johnnie Walker Lunchtime Show; Broadcast 05-09/06/1972	3:28
16.	"Oh! You Pretty Things"		Recorded 22/05/1972 for Johnnie Walker Lunchtime Show; Broadcast 05-09/06/1972	2:55
17.	"Andy Warhol"		Recorded 23/05/1972 for Sounds of the 70s Broadcast 19/06/1972	3:12
18.	"Lady Stardust"		Recorded 23/05/1972 for Sounds of the 70s Broadcast 19/06/1972	3:19
19.	"Rock 'n' Roll Suicide"		Recorded 23/05/1972 for Sounds of the 70s Broadcast 19/06/1972	3:08

Disc 3:BBC Radio Theatre - 27/06/2000
No.	Title	Writer(s)	Length
1.	"Wild Is the Wind"	Dimitri Tiomkin & Ned Washington	6:21
2.	"Ashes to Ashes"		5:03
3.	"Seven"	Bowie & Reeves Gabrels	4:12
4.	"This Is Not America"	Bowie, Pat Metheny & Lyle Mays	3:43
5.	"Absolute Beginners"		6:31
6.	"Always Crashing in the Same Car"		4:06
7.	"Survive"	Bowie/Gabrels	4:54
8.	"Little Wonder"	Bowie, Gabrels & Mark Plati	3:48
9.	"The Man Who Sold the World"		3:57
10.	"Fame"	Bowie, Carlos Alomar & John Lennon	4:11
11.	"Stay"		5:43
12.	"Hallo Spaceboy"	Bowie & Brian Eno	5:21
13.	"Cracked Actor"		4:09
14.	"I'm Afraid of Americans"	Bowie/Eno	5:29
15.	"Let's Dance"		6:20

== Personnel ==
Track numbers below refer to the Japanese CD version of this album, which contains an exclusive track.

- David Bowie – vocals, guitar, keyboard
- The Tony Visconti Orchestra:
  - Herbie Flowers – bass
  - Barry Morgan – drums
  - John McLaughlin – guitar
  - Alan Hawkshaw – keyboards
  - Tony Visconti – backing vocals
  - Steve Peregrin Took – backing vocals
- Junior's Eyes:
  - Mick Wayne – guitar
  - Tim Renwick – rhythm guitar
  - John "Honk" Lodge – bass
  - John Cambridge – drums
- The Tony Visconti Trio aka The Hype:
  - Tony Visconti – bass
  - Mick Ronson – guitar
  - John Cambridge – drums
- David Bowie and friends:
  - David Bowie – vocals, guitar, keyboards
  - Mick Ronson – guitar, vocal
  - Trevor Bolder – bass
  - Mick Woodmansey – drums
  - Mark Carr-Pritchard – guitar
  - George Underwood – vocal
  - Dana Gillespie – vocal
  - Geoffrey Alexander – vocal
- David Bowie and The Spiders from Mars (disc 2, tracks 4–20):
  - David Bowie – vocals, guitar
  - Mick Ronson – guitar, vocal
  - Trevor Bolder – bass
  - Woody Woodmansey – drums
- Disc 3, 27 June 2000:
  - David Bowie – Vocals
  - Earl Slick – guitar
  - Mark Plati - Guitar & Bass
  - Gail Ann Dorsey - Bass, Guitar & Vocals
  - Sterling Campbell - Drums
  - Mike Garson - Piano & Keyboards
  - Holly Palmer - Backing vocals & Percussion
  - Emm Gryner - Backing vocals & Keyboard

=== Additional personnel ===
- Nicky Graham – piano on disc 2, tracks 9–20

=== Production personnel ===
- Bernie Andrews – producer, disc 1 tracks 1–4, 13
- Pete Ritzema – engineer, disc 1 tracks 1–6, producer disc 2 tracks 9–13
- Alan Harris – engineer, disc 1 tracks 1–4
- Paul Williams – recording producer, disc 1 tracks 5–6
- Jeff Griffin – recording producer, disc 1 tracks 7–12, 14–18, disc 2 tracks 4–8, 18–20
- Tony Wilson – sound balance, disc 1 tracks 7–12
- Chris Lycett – assistant, disc 1 tracks 7–12, sound balance disc 1 tracks 14–18, disc 2 tracks 4–8, 18–20
- Nick Gomm – engineer, disc 1 track 13, disc 2 tracks 9–13
- John Etchells – assistant, disc 1 tracks 14–18, disc 2 tracks 4–8, 18–20
- John F. Muir – recording producer, disc 2 tracks 1–3
- John White – engineer, disc 2 tracks 1–3
- Bill Aitken – engineer, disc 2 tracks 1–3
- Roger Pusey – producer disc 2 tracks 14–17

== Charts and certifications ==
=== Weekly charts ===
Chart (2000–2016)	Peak position
Belgian Albums (Ultratop Flanders)	15
Belgian Albums (Ultratop Wallonia)	14
Dutch Albums (Album Top 100)	56
French Albums (SNEP)	27
German Albums (Offizielle Top 100)	69
Hungarian Albums (MAHASZ)	22
Irish Albums (IRMA)	11
Italian Albums (FIMI)	45
Norwegian Albums (VG-lista)	22
Portuguese Albums (AFP)	42
Scottish Albums (Official Charts)	7
Swedish Albums (Sverigetopplistan)	37
Swiss Albums (Schweizer Hitparade)	88
UK Albums (Official Charts)	7
US Billboard 200	181

=== Year-end charts ===
Chart (2000)	Position
UK Albums (OCC)	146

=== Certifications ===
Region	Certification	Certified units/sales
United Kingdom (BPI)	Gold	100,000^{‡}
^{‡} Sales+streaming figures based on certification alone.
