= Wild Eyed Boy from Freecloud =

Song by David Bowie

from the album David Bowie (Space Oddity)
- A-side: "Space Oddity"
- Released: 11 July 1969
- Genre: Art rock; psychedelic folk
- Length: 4:42 (single version); 4:52 (album version)
- Label: Philips
- Songwriter(s): David Bowie
- Producer(s): Gus Dudgeon

David Bowie (Space Oddity) track listing
- 10 tracks Side one: 1. "Space Oddity"; 2. "Unwashed and Somewhat Slightly Dazed"; 3. "Don't Sit Down"; 4. "Letter to Hermione"; 5. "Cygnet Committee"; Side two: 1. "Janine"; 2. "An Occasional Dream"; 3. "Wild Eyed Boy from Freecloud"; 4. "God Knows I'm Good"; 5. "Memory of a Free Festival"

"Wild Eyed Boy from Freecloud" is a song written by David Bowie, first recorded in June 1969 and released as a B-side to his single "Space Oddity". Bowie then rerecorded the song for his second eponymous album (released in the U.S. as Man of Words, Man of Music by Mercury and reissued by RCA in 1972 as Space Oddity).

The single version has sparse instrumentation: guitar (played by Bowie) and arco bass (by Paul Buckmaster). The album version, recorded in July/August 1969, features a full orchestral arrangement by Tony Visconti and is said to be the debut on a Bowie record of Mick Ronson, contributing uncredited lead guitar and handclaps midway through the track.

Bowie himself said of the song: "It was about the disassociated, the ones who feel as though they're left outside, which was how I felt about me. I always felt I was on the edge of events, the fringe of things, and left out. A lot of my characters in those early years seem to revolve around that feeling. It must have come from my own interior puzzlement at where I was".

== Other releases ==
- The single version was released as the B-side to "Space Oddity" and "Ragazzo solo, ragazza sola", prior to the album version. (One release of "Space Oddity" mistakenly rendered the B-side's title as "Wild Eyed Boy from Freedom".) It later appeared on the Sound + Vision box set in 1989, on a 2-CD special edition of Bowie's second self-titled album in 2009, and, in its original UK mono version, on Re:Call 1, part of the Five Years (1969–1973) compilation released in 2015.
- Bowie played this song on Sound of the 70s, a BBC Radio Session with Andy Ferris on 25 March 1970. This recording, broadcast in April 1970, was released in 2000 on Bowie at the Beeb.
- A live version recorded at the Hammersmith Odeon, London, on 3 July 1973 was released on Ziggy Stardust: The Motion Picture (1983). The song was played as a part of a medley with "All the Young Dudes" and "Oh! You Pretty Things".
- The track appeared on the Japanese compilation The Best of David Bowie in 1974.
- A piano, orchestra and choir version of the track appears on the Rick Wakeman album Piano Odyssey, released on Sony Music in 2018.

== Personnel ==
According to Chris O'Leary:

Single version

- David Bowie – lead vocal, 12-string acoustic guitar, handclaps
- Paul Buckmaster – arco bass
- Gus Dudgeon – producer

Album version

- David Bowie – lead vocal, 12-string acoustic guitar, arranger
- Tony Visconti – bass, arranger, producer
- John Cambridge – drums, percussion
- Unknown musicians – orchestra
