= Junior's Eyes =

British band active from 1968 to 1970

- Origin: London, England
- Genres: Progressive rock, psychedelic rock, folk rock
- Years active: 1968–1970
- Labels: Regal Zonophone
- Past members: Mick Wayne; John 'Candy' Carr; John 'Honk' Lodge; Steve Chapman; Graham 'Grom' Kelly; John Redfern; John Cambridge; Tim Renwick

Junior's Eyes was a British group led by guitarist Mick Wayne (born Michael David Wayne, 7 October 1943, Hammersmith, West London – died 26 June 1994, Michigan, USA), which recorded one album and is notable for acting as David Bowie's backing band during 1969.

== Beginnings ==
Mick Wayne's first group was The Outsiders, with Jimmy Page on guitar. After recording one single for Decca Records in 1965, the Outsiders broke up the following year at which point Wayne joined Hull musicians The Hullaballoos, replacing Ricky Knight briefly before they too broke up. He made an attempt to form a new line-up in Hull with drummer John Cambridge but soon returned to London (Cambridge later joined Hull band The Rats, with guitarist Mick Ronson). Wayne next joined the Bunch of Fives (including ex-Pretty Things drummer Viv Prince) during 1966 and this band evolved into The Tickle, with band members Mick Wayne (guitar), Mike Docker (vocals), Dave Williams (keyboards), Richard Dowling (bass) and John Beckerman (drums). The Tickle's only single – "Subway (Smokey Pokey World)" – has appeared on many psychedelic compilation albums, including Acid Drops, Spacedust & Flying Saucers: Psychedelic Confectionery.

== Junior's Eyes ==
After the break-up of the Tickle, Mick Wayne formed Junior's Eyes in early 1968, initially with drummer John 'Candy' Carr and then with John 'Honk' Lodge (ex-Graham Bond Organisation) (bass) and Steve Chapman (drums). They recorded a debut single with the help of pianist Rick Wakeman and producer Tony Visconti. The trio added singer Graham 'Grom' Kelly and (briefly) organist John Redfern in late 1968 and began work on an album. Battersea Power Station was released in June 1969.

That same month, Mick Wayne and Rick Wakeman were among the guest musicians who recorded David Bowie's breakthrough hit "Space Oddity". For the follow-up Space Oddity album recorded between June and September 1969, Bowie and producer Visconti were backed by a new line-up of Junior's Eyes comprising Mick Wayne (guitar), John 'Honk' Lodge (bass), John Cambridge (drums) and Tim Renwick (guitar, flute, recorder). The same band backed Bowie on a BBC Radio Dave Lee Travis Show session in October 1969, and (without Wayne) on single B-side "Conversation Piece", recorded in January 1970. Wayne had also helped record James Taylor's debut album between July and October 1968, and Honk had played on the album Think Pink (track "Rock and Roll the Joint") by Pretty Things drummer Twink in July 1969. These recording session for other artists disrupted the progress of the band, and the new line-up recorded only one single. They played their final gig on 3 February 1970, supporting Bowie at the Marquee Club. At this gig Cambridge introduced Bowie to his former 'Rats' bandmate Mick Ronson, and within days Cambridge, Ronson and Visconti (playing bass) were Bowie's new backing band The Hype, but Cambridge departed at the end of March.

== Later careers ==
Honk and Renwick formed Quiver, but Honk soon left (briefly joining ex-Pink Fairies drummer Twink in the Last Minute Put Together Boogie Band in Cambridge). Renwick continued with the band, which later joined up with the Sutherland Brothers, and he later recorded with Mike + The Mechanics and both Roger Waters and the David Gilmour-led Pink Floyd, as well as releasing a number of solo albums. Mick Wayne left for the US after Junior's Eyes to back Joe Cocker, and spent a few years doing session work there before returning to London and joining a 1972 Steve Peregrin Took recording session along with Pink Fairies rhythm section Duncan Sanderson and Russell Hunter, whose band was temporarily defunct following the departure of guitarist Paul Rudolph. None of the tracks were completed to Took's satisfaction, due to what Wayne later described as "dope-induced thinking" and consequently, Wayne, Sanderson and Hunter formed a new incarnation of the Pink Fairies, releasing the single "Well, Well, Well" / "Hold On", as well as doing a radio session for BBC Radio One. However Sanderson and Hunter became unhappy with the musical direction Wayne was taking the band in, and they convinced Larry Wallis to join the group as a second guitarist and shortly afterwards sacked Wayne. He later formed pub-rock bands Juniors and Ozo in the mid-1970s before retiring from music. He was about to record a comeback solo album when he died in a fire at his producer's house in 1994.

== Discography ==
Singles

- "Keep On Doing It" / "Songs We Sang Last Summer" ('The Outsiders', August 1965)
- "Go Home Baby" / "At The Station" ('Bunch Of Fives', August 1966)
- "Subway (Smokey Pokey World)" / "Good Evening" ('The Tickle', November 1967)
- "Mr Golden Trumpet Player" / "Black Snake" (June 1968)
- "Woman Love" / "Circus Days" (May 1969)
- "Star Child" / "Sink Or Swim" (August 1969)

Albums

- Battersea Power Station (June 1969, re-issued 2000)
- Bowie at the Beeb (David Bowie, June 2000 - band credited on tracks recorded in October 1969)
