= Lady Stardust =

Song by David Bowie

from the album The Rise and Fall of Ziggy Stardust and the Spiders from Mars
- Released: 16 June 1972
- Recorded: 12 November 1971
- Studio: Trident, London
- Genre: Glam rock
- Length: 3:21
- Label: RCA
- Songwriter: David Bowie
- Producers: David Bowie; Ken Scott

"Lady Stardust" is a song written by the English singer-songwriter David Bowie that appeared on the album The Rise and Fall of Ziggy Stardust and the Spiders from Mars (1972). Co-produced by Ken Scott, Bowie recorded it with his backing band the Spiders from Mars – comprising Mick Ronson, Trevor Bolder and Mick Woodmansey. The song is generally interpreted as alluding to fellow glam rock icon Marc Bolan. Indeed, some accounts have suggested that the original demo version had "A Song for Marc" as a working title.

== Composition and recording ==
Bowie recorded "Lady Stardust" on 12 November 1971 at Trident Studios in London for inclusion on The Rise and Fall of Ziggy Stardust and the Spiders from Mars. Co-produced by Ken Scott, the lineup consisted of Bowie's backing band known as the Spiders from Mars—comprising guitarist Mick Ronson, bassist Trevor Bolder and drummer Mick Woodmansey. Also recorded on this day were "Soul Love", "Moonage Daydream" and a re-recording of The Man Who Sold the World track "The Supermen".

== Live versions ==
- Bowie played the song at the BBC show Sounds of the 70s with Bob Harris on 23 May 1972. This was broadcast on 19 June 1972 and in 2000 was released on the album Bowie at the Beeb.

== Personnel ==
Personnel per Kevin Cann.

- David Bowie – lead vocals, acoustic guitar
- Mick Ronson – piano, backing vocals
- Trevor Bolder – bass guitar
- Mick Woodmansey – drums

== Other releases ==
- The original demo version of the song, recorded on 4-track in March 1971, was released in edited, mono form as a bonus track on the Rykodisc CD release of Ziggy Stardust in 1990. This version of the demo also appeared on the Ziggy Stardust – 30th Anniversary Reissue bonus disc in 2002. A stereo mix of the demo was sold as a picture disc single during the "David Bowie Is" exhibition in Japan in 2017 and was included in the 2024 box set Rock 'n' Roll Star!
- The song appeared on the Russian compilation Starman in 1989.
- A November 1996 recording of the song, which originally aired on a BBC radio broadcast in 1997, was released in 2020 on the album ChangesNowBowie.
- An early, alternative take of the song from the November 1971 recording session was released for the first time in 2024 in the box set Rock 'n' Roll Star!
