= Cygnet Committee =

Song by David Bowie

from the album David Bowie
- Released: 14 November 1969
- Recorded: August–September 1969
- Genre: Progressive rock; psychedelic folk
- Length: 9:33
- Label: Philips (UK); Mercury (US)
- Songwriter(s): David Bowie
- Producer(s): Tony Visconti

David Bowie track listing
- 10 tracks Side 1: 1. "Space Oddity"; 2. "Unwashed and Somewhat Slightly Dazed"; 3. "Don't Sit Down"; 4. "Letter to Hermione"; 5. "Cygnet Committee"; Side 2: 1. "Janine"; 2. "An Occasional Dream"; 3. "Wild Eyed Boy from Freecloud"; 4. "God Knows I'm Good"; 5. "Memory of a Free Festival"

"Cygnet Committee" is a song written by the English singer-songwriter David Bowie and recorded in 1969 for his second eponymous album (released in the U.S. as Man of Words, Man of Music and re-released in 1972 as Space Oddity). At over 9 minutes this ambitious progressive folk rock song was Bowie's longest studio recording until the opening/title track of 1976's Station to Station.

== Lyrical background ==
"Cygnet Committee" developed from an earlier composition of Bowie's that had been written in the style of Simon and Garfunkel called "Lover to the Dawn". In early 1969, Bowie recorded an acetate demo of the song as a duet with John Hutchinson. "Lover to the Dawn" was intended as material for Bowie's soon-defunct folk combo, Feathers, which also included Hermione Farthingale, his girlfriend at the time. On Bowie's 1969 album, Farthingale was to become the subject of two other songs ("Letter to Hermione" and "An Occasional Dream") mourning the end of their relationship.

During 1969, Bowie and his new girlfriend, Angela Barnett, lived in Beckenham, where they ran the Arts Lab, trying to encourage young people to be creative. However, Bowie soon quit the Arts Lab, when he realized that most people were coming just to see him perform and not to participate. His disappointing encounter with the hippies during this time is the basis for the song, as he felt he was used and abused by the teens: "I gave them [my] life... They drained my very soul..."

== Plot ==
As with many of Bowie's works, the song is a dystopian narrative. One strand of the story concerns a man who helped revolutionaries establish a new order by, "open[ing] doors that would have blocked their way" and "ravag[ing] at my finance." The revolutionaries, "let him use his powers," so they could "infiltrate business cesspools/Hating through our sleeves." But "now [they] are strong" while the man "sits alone growing older" having been forgotten by those he helped. The other strand of the story describes the post-revolutionary world, revealing that it is not the utopia that had been hoped for. The mottoes of the new state are, "I will kill for the good of the fight for the right to be right," and "We can force you to be free." Near the end of the song, the narrator describes what has become of the revolution:

A love machine lumbers through desolation rows
Ploughing down man, woman, listening to its command
But not hearing anymore.

== Live versions ==
- Bowie played the song at The Sunday Show introduced by John Peel on 5 February 1970. This was broadcast on 8 February 1970 and in 2000 was released on the album Bowie at the Beeb.

== Other releases ==
- It was released as the B-side of the Eastern European single "The Width of a Circle" in June 1973.
- It appeared on the Japanese compilation The Best of David Bowie in 1974.

== Personnel ==
According to Chris O'Leary:

- David Bowie – lead vocal
- Keith Christmas – 12-string acoustic guitar
- Mick Wayne – lead guitar
- Tim Renwick – rhythm guitar
- Rick Wakeman – electric harpsichord
- John Lodge – bass
- John Cambridge – drums
- Tony Visconti – producer
