= Keith Christmas =

English singer and songwriter (1946–2026)

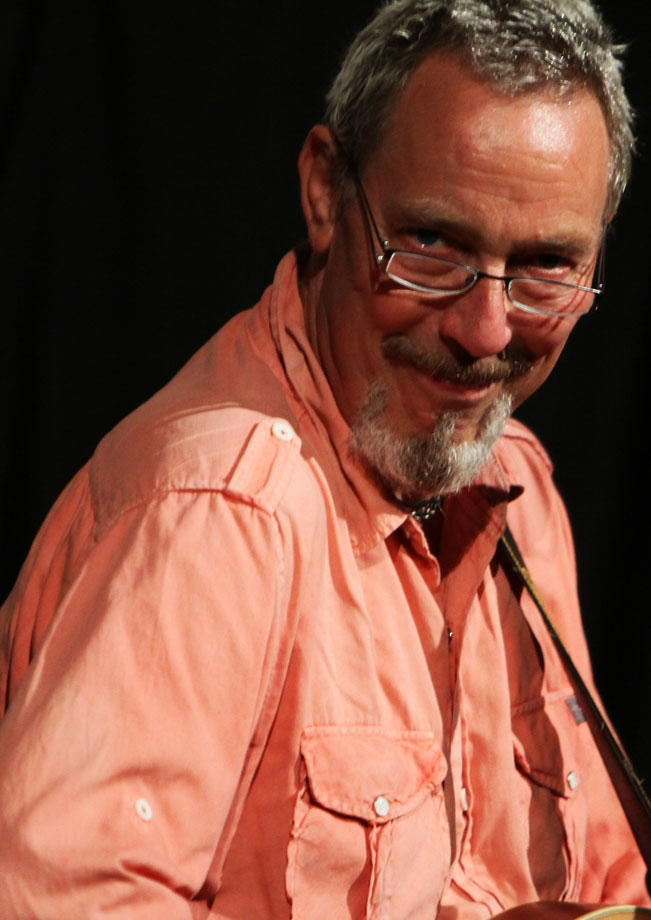
- Christmas in 2012.

Background information
- Born: Keith Peter Christmas; 13 October 1946; Wivenhoe, Essex, England
- Died: 8 October 2026 (aged 79)
- Genre: Folk rock
- Years active: Late 1960s–2026
- Labels: RCA Victor; B & C; Manticore; Apple; Voiceprint; BECN; Woronzow; HTD
- Website: keithchristmas.com

Keith Peter Christmas (13 October 1946 – 8 October 2026) was an English singer and songwriter.

== Life and career ==
Keith Peter Christmas was born in Wivenhoe, near Colchester, Essex, England, on 13 October 1946. He attended Bath University to read architecture but, because the Architecture School was, at that time, based in Kingsweston House, Bristol, he became part of that city's folk set.

In 1969, his first album, Stimulus, was released on RCA Victor via a production deal with Sandy Roberton's September Productions, to whom Christmas was signed. Christmas played acoustic guitar on David Bowie's Space Oddity album and appeared at the first Glastonbury Festival in 1970. Through the 1970s he released albums on B&C and Manticore, while touring with and supporting bands such as The Who, King Crimson, Ten Years After, Frank Zappa, Roxy Music, Hawkwind, Captain Beefheart and The Kinks. Among the musicians who contributed to his recordings were Mighty Baby, Pat Donaldson, Keith Tippett, Gerry Conway, Shelagh McDonald, Rod Argent, Peter Sinfield, Greg Lake, Mel Collins, Cat Stevens, Adrian Shaw (Magic Muscle and, later, Hawkwind), and Michael Boshears.

Although predominantly an acoustic guitarist, he was not averse to playing electric guitar and regularly jammed with Bristol-based, acid rock band, Magic Muscle. He can be heard on the retrospective compilation, The Pipe, the Roar, the Grid. The photograph on the front of his second LP, Fable of the Wings, was taken inside part of Magic Muscle's squat in Cotham, Bristol. In 1971, he released Pigmy, which included one side of acoustic songs, and one side of band pieces, which have a very free, jamming feel to the instrumental sections. The choral and string parts were arranged by Robert Kirby, better known for his arrangements for Nick Drake. The 2004 retrospective album, Timeless and Strange, was named after a track on Pigmy, which featured, then Bristol-based artist, Bob Stewart on psaltery.

In 1972, he was voted one of six favourite international artists by writers of Sounds magazine. The irony was that he was effectively unsigned at this point because his record label, B&C, had recently ceased trading. He was signed by the recently formed Manticore label, which was set up by Emerson, Lake & Palmer and their manager, Stewart Young, for whom he recorded Brighter Day and Stories from the Human Zoo. He also sang on Danse Macabre, by Esperanto, in 1974, the connection being that the LP was produced by Manticore artist/producer, Pete Sinfield. A further Pete Sinfield connection is that Christmas wrote the lyrics for the English language release of Angelo Branduardi's Life Is the Only Teacher in 1979 - Sinfield had written the lyrics for Branduardi's previous English language release, Highdown Fair.

In 1976, after recording Stories from the Human Zoo with Donald 'Duck' Dunn and Steve Cropper from Booker T. & the MGs, at Indigo Ranch Studios, in America, he came back to England and, with Manticore becoming inactive for new releases, after a few years he stopped playing. In 1983, his composition, "Fable of the Wings", was covered by 'folk-rock' supergroup, Brass Monkey, which featured Martin Carthy and John Kirkpatrick.

In the late 1980s, he moved back to Bristol and began playing solo acoustic sets, as well as sets with his blues band, Red House. During this time he released two limited edition cassettes, one solo and one with the band. He formed the blues band, Weatherman, in 1991 with some friends and an album of the same name was released in 1992.

In 1996, he started to write a different kind of acoustic material, which led to the release of an album Love Beyond Deals on HTD Records.

In January 2003, Christmas released an instrumental CD, Acoustica. The opening track was used on the BBC documentary Hidden Gardens. In 2006, he recorded and produced his first ever solo CD called Light of the Dawn. The magazine fRoots reviewed it “…the sound is fantastic and grabs the attention: the confident, gutsy guitar, picked or slide, has immediacy and intimacy in equal measure; and Christmas's urgent, hoarse vocals can't help but involve the listener in the moods and stories of the songs… a fine timeless album”.

In 2011, Christmas released a five-track solo acoustic EP called Fat Cat Big Fish and, in 2012, released his first live CD, Live at the Pump. In December 2016, Christmas released a new CD, Crazy Dancing Days.

He also played at a fundraising festival, Bowie's Beckenham Oddity in Beckenham, to help raise funds for the Bowie Bandstand. The bandstand was the same edifice that Christmas performed on in 1969, as part of the Growth Summer Festival and Free Concert, (which was co-organised by David Bowie). Christmas performed at the 2017 and 2019 festivals. The Bowie Bandstand was given Grade II listed status on 16 August 2019, on the 50th anniversary of the original Growth Summer Festival.

His last album, Life, Life, was released on 1 September 2019.

He was diagnosed with renal cancer in 2022. Keith Christmas died from the disease on 8 October 2026, aged 79.

== Discography ==
- Stimulus 1969
- Fable of the Wings 1970
- Pigmy 1971
- Brighter Day 1974
- Stories from the Human Zoo 1976
- Red House (ltd. ed. cassette sold at gigs only)
- Dead Line Blues (ltd. ed. cassette sold at gigs only)
- Weatherman 1992
- Love Beyond Deals 1996
- Acoustica 2003
- Timeless & Strange (compilation 1969-71) 2004
- Light of the Dawn 2006
- Fat Cat Big Fish 2011
- Live at the Pump 2012
- Crazy Dancing Days 2016
- Life, Life 2019
