= Unwashed and Somewhat Slightly Dazed =

Song by David Bowie

from the album David Bowie (Space Oddity)
- Released: 14 November 1969
- Recorded: Late August – 16 September 1969
- Studio: Trident, London
- Length: 6:13
- Label: Philips
- Songwriter(s): David Bowie
- Producer(s): Tony Visconti

David Bowie (Space Oddity) track listing
- 10 tracks Side 1: 1. "Space Oddity"; 2. "Unwashed and Somewhat Slightly Dazed"; 3. "Don't Sit Down"; 4. "Letter to Hermione"; 5. "Cygnet Committee"; Side 2: 1. "Janine"; 2. "An Occasional Dream"; 3. "Wild Eyed Boy from Freecloud"; 4. "God Knows I'm Good"; 5. "Memory of a Free Festival"

"Unwashed and Somewhat Slightly Dazed" is a song by the English musician David Bowie, released on his 1969 album David Bowie. It was one of the first songs produced by Tony Visconti.

== Inspiration ==
In July 1969, Bowie performed at the Maltese Music Festival while his father became sick and later died. The feel of the song was meant to show Bowie's feelings after his father's death.

The song also seems to be about social structure, as the girl in the song is very wealthy compared to the narrator. Bowie said that the song was written because he got "funny stares" from people.

== Song structure ==
The song opens with acoustic Asus2 and D9 chords. This repeats until the song enters the main structure, a new beat with guitars and harmonica. This part of the song mainly switches between C and F, but occasionally uses other chords as well. After the lyrics finish, the music continues for about two minutes before ending.

== Personnel ==
According to Chris O'Leary:

- David Bowie – lead vocal
- Keith Christmas – 12-string acoustic guitar
- Mick Wayne – lead guitar
- Tim Renwick – rhythm guitar
- John Lodge – bass
- John Cambridge – drums
- Benny Marshall – harmonica
- Unknown musicians – saxophones, trumpets
- Tony Visconti – producer
