= Memory of a Free Festival =

1969 song by David Bowie

Song by David Bowie

from the album David Bowie (Space Oddity)
- Released: 14 November 1969
- Recorded: Late August – 16 September 1969
- Studio: Trident, London
- Length: 7:06
- Label: Philips
- Songwriter: David Bowie
- Producer: Tony Visconti

David Bowie (Space Oddity) track listing
- 10 tracks Side 1: 1. "Space Oddity"; 2. "Unwashed and Somewhat Slightly Dazed"; 3. "Don't Sit Down"; 4. "Letter to Hermione"; 5. "Cygnet Committee"; Side 2: 1. "Janine"; 2. "An Occasional Dream"; 3. "Wild Eyed Boy from Freecloud"; 4. "God Knows I'm Good"; 5. "Memory of a Free Festival"

"Memory of a Free Festival"

Single by David Bowie
- A-side: "Memory of a Free Festival Part 1"
- B-side: "Memory of a Free Festival Part 2"
- Released: 12 June 1970
- Recorded: Trident, London: 8–9 September 1969 (album track); Trident and Advision, London: 21, 23 March, 3, 14–15 April 1970 (single)
- Genre: Folk rock; progressive rock
- Length: 3:59 (Part 1); 3:31 (Part 2)
- Label: Mercury
- Songwriter: David Bowie
- Producer: Tony Visconti

David Bowie singles chronology
"The Prettiest Star" (1970)	"Memory of a Free Festival" (1970)	"Holy Holy" (1971)

Alternative cover

"Memory of a Free Festival" is a song by the English singer-songwriter David Bowie. Originally recorded in September 1969 as a seven-minute opus for Bowie's second self-titled album, it was reworked in March–April 1970 at the behest of Mercury Records, the label believing that the track had a better chance of success as a single than "The Prettiest Star", released earlier in the year. Bowie and Tony Visconti roughly split the track in half, re-recording it so both halves could function as individual songs. A more rock-oriented version than the earlier album cut, this rendition featured guitarist Mick Ronson.

Biographer David Buckley described "Memory of a Free Festival" as "a sort of trippy retake of the Stones' 'Sympathy for the Devil' but with a smiley lyric". The track was written as a homage to the Free Festival, organised by the Beckenham Arts Lab, which was held at Croydon Road Recreation Ground in Beckenham on 16 August 1969.

Released in America in June 1970, the single was commercially unsuccessful; only a few hundred copies sold. It was also issued in the UK, but was similarly unsuccessful there.

The two-part single version was subsequently released on CD on the EMI/Rykodisc reissue of Bowie's 1969 self-titled album (in 1990), on a 2-CD special edition of that album (in 2009), and on Re:Call 1, part of the Five Years (1969–1973) compilation (in 2015).

== Recording ==
David Bowie used a child's Rosedale Electric Chord Organ, obtained from Woolworths, on both LP and single versions of the song to give a "classic Ivor Cutler/harmonium feel". Producer Tony Visconti recalled that Bowie "always had a hard time playing the organ and singing part one of the song".

The late reworking of the song also featured a Moog synthesizer played by classical music producer Ralph Mace and programmed by Chris Thomas. Mace would play the instrument again on the recording of The Man Who Sold the World (1970).

== Track listing ==
1. "Memory of a Free Festival Part 1" (Bowie) – 3:59
2. "Memory of a Free Festival Part 2" (Bowie) – 3:31

== Personnel ==
According to Chris O'Leary:

Album version

- David Bowie – lead vocal, Rosedale electric chord organ
- Mick Wayne – lead guitar
- Tim Renwick – rhythm guitar
- John Lodge – bass
- John Cambridge – drums
- Unknown musicians – baritone saxophones
- Tony Visconti – producer, arranger, backing vocals
- Bob and Sue Harris – backing vocals
- Tony Woollcott – backing vocals
- Marc Bolan – backing vocals
- "Girl" – backing vocals

Single version

- David Bowie – lead vocals, 12-string acoustic guitar, chord organ
- Mick Ronson – guitar, backing vocals
- Tony Visconti – bass, backing vocals, string arrangement, producer
- Ralph Mace – Moog synthesiser
- John Cambridge – drums
- Unknown musicians – strings

== Other versions ==
- Bowie performed the song during a session for radio's The Sunday Show on 5 February 1970; it was broadcast on 8 February. An edited take of this performance was included on the 2000 compilation, Bowie at the Beeb.
- Bowie also performed the song during the 1973 Ziggy Stardust tour, as the third part of a medley which began with "Quicksand" and "Life on Mars?" (one such performance, from the Glasgow Apollo on 15 May 1973, has appeared on several bootleg albums).
- The Mike Garson Band, the name given to Bowie's backing group on his Philly Dogs tour, closed their supporting set with a soul-influenced version of the song on Bowie's 1974 US tour. The performance from the Radio City Music Hall, New York City on 28 October 1974 was included on the bootleg album Infected with Soul Love.

== Cover versions ==
- E-Zee Possee released a dance song in 1990, called "The Sun Machine" which mentions Bowie in their credits. It was a minor house-rave success, released in many formats on Boy George's dance label, More Protein.
- Dario G sampled Bowie in 1998 for their UK No. 17 hit single "Sunmachine".
- Belgian duo Tom Barman and Guy Van Nueten had an acoustic version in their 2002 theatre tour, released in 2003 on their album Live.
- Mercury Rev performed a cover of the song for their 2006 compilation Stillness Breathes.
- The Gene Ween Band has been known to include "Memory of a Free Festival" as part of their live performances.
- Edward Sharpe and the Magnetic Zeros covered it as part of Manimal Vinyl's 2 CD tribute to Bowie in September 2010 titled We Were So Turned On: A Tribute to David Bowie.
- Danish band Kashmir covered it live during their 2006 tour, including concerts in the Netherlands.
- The Polyphonic Spree covered the "Sun Machine" section throughout their career in various live performances.
- Polish band Myslovitz covered the song on their second album Sun Machine.
