= The Supermen =

Song by David Bowie

from the album The Man Who Sold the World
- Released: 4 November 1970 (US); April 1971 (UK)
- Recorded: 18 April – 22 May 1970
- Studio: Trident and Advision, London
- Genre: Hard rock; psychedelic rock
- Length: 3:38
- Label: Mercury
- Songwriter: David Bowie
- Producer: Tony Visconti

"The Supermen" is a song by English singer-songwriter David Bowie, written in 1970 for his third studio album, The Man Who Sold the World, released later that year in the US and in April 1971 in the UK. The song is one of several on the album to take inspiration from the works of literary figures, such as Friedrich Nietzsche and H. P. Lovecraft.

== Music and lyrics ==
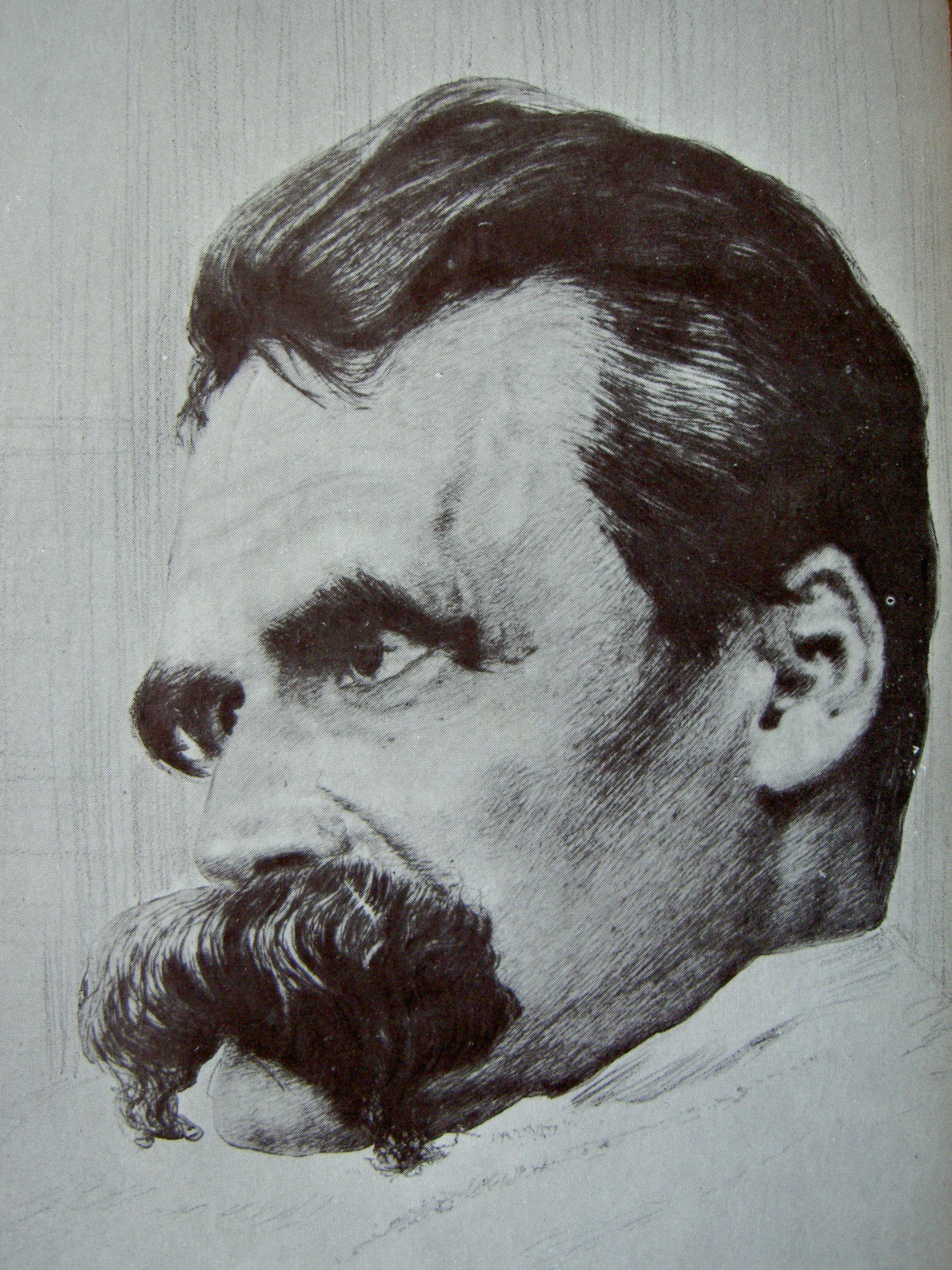
The Supermen was influenced by Friedrich Nietzsche's concept of the Übermensch.

The song has been cited as reflecting the influence of German Romanticism, its theme and lyrics referencing the apocalyptic visions of Friedrich Nietzsche and its prominent timpani part being likened to Richard Strauss' Also Sprach Zarathustra. Bowie later said "I was still going through the thing when I was pretending that I understood Nietzsche... And I had tried to translate it into my own terms to understand it so 'Supermen' came out of that." Critics have also seen the influence of H. P. Lovecraft's stories of "dormant elder gods".

According to Bowie himself the guitar riff was given to him by Jimmy Page when the latter, who was Shel Talmy's session guitarist in the mid-1960s, played on one of Bowie's early releases, "I Pity the Fool". The riff was later used on another Bowie song, "Dead Man Walking", from the Earthling album in 1997.

== Live versions ==
- An early performance of the song, by the Hype, on the BBC show Sounds of the 70s: Andy Ferris, recorded in March 1970, was released for the first time in 2016 on the vinyl edition of the album Bowie at the Beeb.
- Bowie and Ronson played the song on the BBC show Sounds of the 70s: Bob Harris on 21 September 1971. This was broadcast on 4 October 1971 and was released in 2000 on Bowie at the Beeb.
- A live version recorded at the Boston Music Hall on 1 October 1972 was released in 1989 on the original Sound + Vision box set, but was not included in subsequent versions of this compilation. However, the same track appeared on the bonus disc of the Aladdin Sane – 30th Anniversary Edition in 2003.
- Another live version recorded at Santa Monica Civic Auditorium on 20 October 1972 was released on Santa Monica '72 and Live Santa Monica '72.

== Other releases ==
An alternate version of the song was recorded on 12 November 1971 during sessions for The Rise and Fall of Ziggy Stardust and the Spiders from Mars. It first appeared on the album Revelations – A Musical Anthology for Glastonbury Fayre in July 1972, compiled by the organisers of Glastonbury Festival at which Bowie played in 1971. It was later released as a bonus track on the Rykodisc CD and cassette reissue of Hunky Dory in 1990, and again on the Ziggy Stardust – 30th Anniversary Reissue bonus disc in 2002. This version was sampled on "Culture Shock", from Death Grips's 2011 mixtape Exmilitary.

A November 1996 tour rehearsal recording of the song, which originally aired on a BBC radio broadcast in 1997, was released in 2020 on the album ChangesNowBowie. The Ziggy session recordings were released on the Rock 'n' Roll Star! box set in 2024.

== Cover versions ==
- Doctor Mix and the Remix (aka Metal Urbain) – Wall of Noise (1979)
- Aquaserge – Repetition – A Tribute to David Bowie (2010)

== Personnel ==
According to biographer Chris O'Leary:

- David Bowie – lead and backing vocal
- Mick Ronson – lead and rhythm guitar, backing vocal
- Tony Visconti – bass, backing vocal
- Mick Woodmansey – drums, timpani

Technical

- Tony Visconti – producer
- Ken Scott – engineer
- Gerald Chevin – engineer
