= David Bowie (1969 album) =

Studio album by David Bowie

- 1969 UK release

Studio album by David Bowie
- Released: 14 November 1969
- Recorded: 20 June, 16 July – 6 October 1969
- Studio: Trident (London)
- Genres: Folk rock; psychedelic rock
- Length: 45:28
- Label: Philips
- Producers: Gus Dudgeon; Tony Visconti

David Bowie chronology
David Bowie (1967)	David Bowie (1969)	The World of David Bowie (1970)

Singles from David Bowie
- 1. "Space Oddity" Released: 11 July 1969

David Bowie (commonly known as Space Oddity) (Note: In his book The Complete David Bowie, the biographer Nicholas Pegg refers to the album as Space Oddity throughout. He states that following its 1972 reissue, the album was not referred to again as David Bowie until its 2009 reissue, meaning Space Oddity was its official title for almost forty years. Pegg further states that this differentiates it from Bowie's 1967 self-titled debut album.) is the second studio album by the English musician David Bowie, released in the United Kingdom on 14 November 1969 through Mercury affiliate Philips Records. Financed by Mercury on the strength of the success of the single, "Space Oddity", the album was recorded from June to October 1969 at Trident Studios in London. Gus Dudgeon produced "Space Oddity", while Tony Visconti produced the rest of the album. Session musicians included Herbie Flowers, Rick Wakeman, Terry Cox and the band Junior's Eyes.

Departing from the music hall style of Bowie's 1967 self-titled debut, David Bowie contains folk rock and psychedelic rock songs, with lyrical themes influenced by events happening in Bowie's life at the time, including former relationships and festivals he attended. "Space Oddity", a tale about a fictional astronaut, was released as a single in July 1969 and became Bowie's first commercial hit, reaching the UK top five.

The album was a commercial failure due to a lack of promotion, despite receiving some positive reviews from music critics. For its release in the United States, Mercury retitled the album Man of Words/Man of Music and used different artwork. RCA Records reissued the album under the title of Space Oddity following Bowie's commercial breakthrough with Ziggy Stardust in 1972, using a contemporary photo of Bowie as the artwork. The reissue charted in both the UK and the US.

David Bowie has received mixed reviews in later decades, with many finding a lack of cohesiveness. Bowie himself later stated that it lacked musical direction. Debate continues as to whether it should stand as Bowie's first "proper" album. David Bowie has been reissued numerous times, with bonus tracks and variance on the inclusion and listing of the hidden track "Don't Sit Down". Labels have used both David Bowie and Space Oddity as the title, with Space Oddity being used for a 2019 remix by Visconti.

== Background ==
David Bowie released his music hall-influenced self-titled debut studio album through Deram Records in 1967. It was a commercial failure and did little to gain him notice, becoming his last release for two years. After its failure, Bowie's manager Kenneth Pitt authorised a promotional film in an attempt to introduce Bowie to a larger audience. At the request of Pitt, Bowie wrote "Space Oddity", a tale about a fictional astronaut, as a song for the film. The film, Love You till Tuesday, went unreleased until 1984, and marked the end of Pitt's mentorship to Bowie.

Stanley Kubrick's 2001: A Space Odyssey (1968) inspired the title and subject matter of "Space Oddity". Bowie demoed the song in January 1969, recording the final Love You till Tuesday version on 2 February. In April, Bowie recorded demos of tracks with guitarist John Hutchinson, including "Janine", "An Occasional Dream", "I'm Not Quite" ("Letter to Hermione"), "Lover to the Dawn" ("Cygnet Committee") and another demo of "Space Oddity". In May, Bowie secured a record contract with Mercury Records on the strength of "Space Oddity". The contract granted him enough finances to make a new studio album, to be distributed through Mercury in the United States and its affiliate Philips Records in the UK.

== Recording ==
To produce the new album, Pitt hired Tony Visconti, the producer of Bowie's later Deram sessions. Visconti saw "Space Oddity", the chosen lead single, as a "novelty record" and passed the production responsibility for the song to Bowie's former engineer Gus Dudgeon. Dudgeon recalled: "I listened to the demo and thought it was incredible. I couldn't believe that Tony didn't want to do it". Comparing the two producers in a 1969 interview, Bowie stated:

Gus is the technician, the arch 'mixer'. He listens to music and says, 'Yes, I like it – it's a groove.' His attitudes to music are very different from a lot of people in the business. With Tony Visconti, who's producing my LP, it's part of his life. He lives with music all day long, it's going on in his room, he writes it, arranges it, produces it, plays it, thinks it, and believes very much in its spiritual source – his whole life is like this.

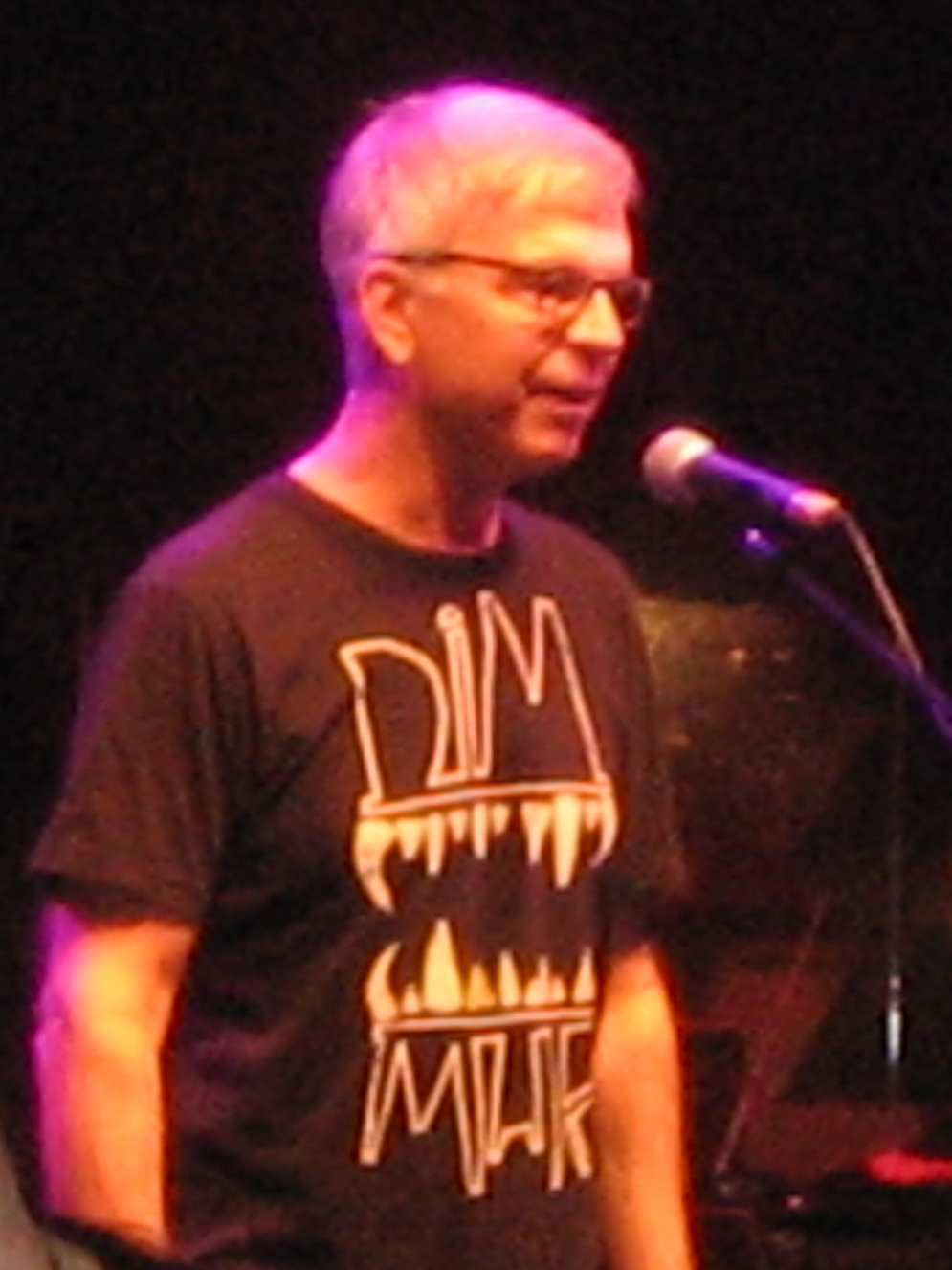
The producer Tony Visconti in 2007

Recording for the new version of "Space Oddity" and its B-side "Wild Eyed Boy from Freecloud" took place on 20 June 1969 at London's Trident Studios; Mercury wanted the single released ahead of the Apollo 11 moon landing. The lineup consisted of Bowie, Herbie Flowers (bass), Rick Wakeman (Mellotron), Terry Cox (drums), Junior's Eyes' guitarist Mick Wayne and an orchestra arranged by Paul Buckmaster. After the single's release on 11 July, recording for the rest of the album continued five days later, with work commencing on "Janine", "An Occasional Dream" and "Letter to Hermione". Visconti recruited the rest of Junior's Eyes minus their vocalist – Wayne and Tim Renwick (guitars), John 'Honk' Lodge (bass) and John Cambridge (drums) – as the main backing band for the sessions; Bowie hired Keith Christmas as an additional guitarist. Beatles' engineer Ken Scott also joined the sessions. According to Renwick, Bowie was "kind of nervous and unsure of himself", and gave little direction during the sessions, which the author Paul Trynka attributed to numerous events in Bowie's personal life at the time. Visconti had little production experience at the time but remained enthusiastic during recording.

Recording continued on and off for the next few months. Bowie wrote "Unwashed and Somewhat Slightly Dazed" following his father's death on 5 August. Eleven days later, he participated in the Beckenham Free Festival, commemorating "Memory of a Free Festival" after the event; recording for the song began on 8 September. According to the biographer Nicholas Pegg, Bowie's "disillusion" with the "slack attitude" of hippie culture caused him to reshape the lyrics of "Cygnet Committee". "God Knows I'm Good" was attempted at Pye Studios in Marble Arch on 11 September, but scrapped due to problems with the recording equipment. The song was re-recorded at Trident five days later. Recording completed on 6 October.

== Music and lyrics ==
The music on David Bowie has been described as folk rock and psychedelic rock, with elements of country and progressive rock. According to the biographer David Buckley, Bowie based the music on the dominant styles of the times "rather than developing a distinct music of his own". Kevin Cann finds the music encompasses "a fusion of acoustic folk leanings with a growing interest in electric rock". Cann continues that David Bowie marked a turning point for the artist, in that lyrically he began "drawing on life" rather than writing "winsome stories". Marc Spitz considers the album one of Bowie's darkest, due to the death of his father. He writes that it reflects the artist's "darkening vision" and depicts "a man coming of age in a world that is increasingly depraved and barren". Susie Goldring of BBC Music calls David Bowie a "kaleidoscopic album [that] is an amalgamation of [Bowie's] obsessions – directors, musicians, poets and spirituality of a distinctly late-60s hue".

=== Songs ===
"Space Oddity" is a largely acoustic song augmented by the eerie tones of the composer's stylophone, a pocket electronic organ. Some commentators have also seen the song as a metaphor for heroin use, citing the opening countdown as analogous to the drug's passage down the needle prior to the euphoric "hit", while noting Bowie's admission of a "silly flirtation with smack" in 1968. "Unwashed and Somewhat Slightly Dazed" reflects a strong Bob Dylan influence, with its harmonica, edgy guitar sound and snarling vocal. Spitz describes the song as an "extensive hard rock jam", while Buckley calls it a "country-meets-prog-rock collision of ideas". A hidden track, subsequently titled "Don't Sit Down", featured at the end of the song on the original UK LP, but was excluded from the US Mercury release and RCA reissue of the album.

"Letter to Hermione" was a farewell ballad to Bowie's former girlfriend Hermione Farthingale, who is also the subject of "An Occasional Dream", a gentle folk tune reminiscent of the singer's 1967 debut album. "God Knows I'm Good", Bowie's observational tale of a shoplifter's plight, also recalls his earlier style. "Cygnet Committee" has been called Bowie's "first true masterpiece" by Pegg. Commonly regarded as the track on David Bowie most indicative of the composer's future direction, its lead character is a messianic figure "who breaks down barriers for his younger followers, but finds that he has only provided them with the means to reject and destroy him". Bowie himself described the song at the time as a put-down of hippies who seemed ready to follow any charismatic leader. "Janine" was written about a girlfriend of Bowie's childhood friend George Underwood. It has been cited as another track that foreshadowed themes to which Bowie returned to in the 1970s, in this case the fracturing of personality, featuring the words "But if you took an axe to me, you'd kill another man not me at all".

The Buddhism-influenced "Wild Eyed Boy from Freecloud" is presented in a heavily expanded form compared to the original guitar-and-cello version on the B-side of the "Space Oddity" single; the album cut features a 50-piece orchestra. "Memory of a Free Festival" is Bowie's reminiscence of an arts festival he had organised in August 1969. Its drawn-out fade/chorus ("The Sun Machine is coming down / And we're gonna have a party") was compared to the Beatles' "Hey Jude"; the song has also been interpreted as a derisive comment on the counterculture it ostensibly celebrates. The background vocals for the crowd finale feature Bob Harris, his wife Sue, Tony Woollcott and Marc Bolan. The outtake "Conversation Piece" has been described as featuring "a lovely melody and an emotive lyric addressing familiar Bowie topics of alienation and social exclusion".

== Title and packaging ==
The album was released in the UK under the same eponymous title as Bowie's 1967 debut, a move Trynka calls "bizarre". The original UK cover artwork featured a facial portrait of Bowie taken by British photographer Vernon Dewhurst, exposed on top of a work by Hungarian artist Victor Vasarely with blue and violet spots on a green background. The artwork, titled CTA 25 Neg, was designed by Bowie and Mercury executive Calvin Mark Lee, who enthusiastically collected Vasarely's works; Lee is credited as CML33. The back cover was an illustration by Underwood and depicted lyrical aspects from the album, stylistically similar to that of the Visconti-produced Tyrannosaurus Rex album My People Were Fair and Had Sky in Their Hair... But Now They're Content to Wear Stars on Their Brows (1968). According to Underwood, the sketches included "a fish in water, two astronauts holding a rose [and] rats in bowler hats representing the Beckenham Arts Lab committee types [Bowie] was so pissed off with". Pegg says these items appear in the final picture, along with a Buddha, a lit joint, an "unmistakable" portrait of Farthingale and "a weeping woman (presumably the shoplifter in 'God Knows I'm Good') being comforted by a Pierrot", which he notes is "remarkably similar in appearance" to the "Ashes to Ashes" character Bowie later adopted. Underwood's illustration is referred to on the sleeve as Depth of a Circle, which according to Bowie was a typo by the record label; he intended it to read Width of a Circle, a title he used for a song on his next album, The Man Who Sold the World (1970). Apart from Bowie, none of the musicians who played on David Bowie were credited on the original pressings, due to the majority being under contract with other labels in the UK; song lyrics were presented on the inner gatefold sleeve.

1970 US release by Mercury (left) and 1972 release by RCA (right). The latter shot used a new photograph to capitalise on the breakthrough of Ziggy Stardust.

For the US release in 1970, the album was renamed Man of Words/Man of Music, although Cann writes that this phrase was added to the cover to describe the artist and was not intended to replace the title. Mercury also changed Vasarely's artwork in favour of a different, but similar photograph by Dewhurst, placed against a plain blue background. Cann criticises this artwork, stating that it "suffered from sloppy technical application and the image appeared washed out as a result of poor duplication of the transparency". The musicians were credited on this release, while song lyrics still appeared on the inner gatefold. Cambridge later said that he "was really pleased to see I was credited inside" in 1991.

In 1972, as part of a reissue campaign undertaken by RCA Records in the wake of the commercial breakthrough of Bowie's fifth studio album Ziggy Stardust, David Bowie was repackaged with the title Space Oddity, after the opening track. (Note: In Spain, the album was retitled Odisea Espacial (Spanish for "Space Odyssey").) For this release, the front cover was updated with a new photograph of Bowie taken the same year by photographer Mick Rock at Haddon Hall, Beckenham. The sleeve notes proclaimed that the album "was NOW then, and it is still now NOW: personal and universal, perhaps galactic, microcosmic and macrocosmic".

== Release and promotion ==
"Space Oddity" was released as a single on 11 July 1969, with "Wild Eyed Boy from Freecloud" as the B-side. The single initially fared poorly on the charts but reached number five on the UK Singles Chart by early November, becoming Bowie's first hit. The single's success in the UK earned Bowie a number of television appearances throughout the rest of 1969, including his first appearance on Top of the Pops in early October. In mid-December, Bowie recorded a new version with Italian lyrics, titled "Ragazzo solo, ragazza sola" (meaning "Lonely Boy, Lonely Girl"), which was released as a single in Italy in 1970 and failed to chart.

Philips issued David Bowie in the UK on 14 November 1969, (Note: The album's US release through Mercury Records is disputed. Peter Doggett gives the US release date as January 1970, while Pegg gives a release date of February 1970.) with the catalogue number SBL 7912. Cann states that Mercury considered releasing "Janine" as a follow-up single to "Space Oddity", but were uncertain about the song's commercial appeal and scrapped it. With little promotion from the label, the album was a commercial failure, barely selling over 5,000 copies by March 1970. The author Christopher Sandford attributed its failure to the majority of the album bearing little resemblance to "Space Oddity".

RCA's 1972 reissue, released on 10 November, reached number 17 on the UK Albums Chart, remaining on the chart for 42 weeks. It also peaked at number 16 on the US Billboard Top LPs & Tape chart in April 1973, remaining on the chart for 36 weeks. The album's 1990 reissue charted at number 64 in the UK.

== Critical reception ==
David Bowie received mixed reviews from music critics on release. Penny Valentine of Disc & Music Echo was positive, describing the album as "rather doomy and un-nerving, but Bowie's point comes across like a latter-day Dylan. It is an album a lot of people are going to expect a lot from. I don't think they'll be disappointed." A reviewer for Music Now! offered similar praise, calling it "[d]eep, thoughtful, probing, exposing, gouging at your innards" and concluded: "This is more than a record. It is an experience. An expression of life as others see it. The lyrics are full of the grandeur of yesterday, the immediacy of today and the futility of tomorrow. This is well worth your attention." Nancy Erlich of The New York Times, in a review published over a year after its release, offered praise, calling it, "a complete, coherent and brilliant vision".

Other reviewers offered more mixed sentiments. A writer for Music Business Weekly found that "Bowie seems to be a little unsure of the direction he is going in", criticising the various musical styles found throughout, ultimately describing the record as "over-ambitious". A reviewer for Zygote praised "Space Oddity" and "Memory of a Free Festival", but felt the album as a whole lacks cohesiveness and is "very awkward to the ear". The reviewer concluded that "Bowie is erratic. When he succeeds, he's excellent; when fails, he's laborious." The Village Voice critic Robert Christgau considered this album and The Man Who Sold the World to be "overwrought excursions".

== Subsequent events ==
Bowie's follow-up to "Space Oddity", "The Prettiest Star", was recorded in January 1970 and released as a single on 6 March, with the David Bowie outtake "Conversation Piece" as the B-side. A love song to his soon-to-be-wife Angie and featuring guitar from Marc Bolan, it failed to chart. At the label's request, Bowie remade "Memory of a Free Festival" for release as the next single, which was split across both A- and B-sides. The two-part single was released on 26 June and again, failed to chart. By this time, Bowie had completed recording The Man Who Sold the World, which featured a shift in musical style towards hard rock. Around the same time, Bowie fired Pitt due to continuing managerial disputes and hired Tony Defries as his new manager.

== Legacy ==
Retrospective reviews and music guides
Review scores
Source	Rating
AllMusic	3/5 stars
Classic Rock	8/10 stars
Encyclopedia of Popular Music	3/5 stars
The Great Rock Discography	6/10
NME	6/10
Pitchfork	6.7/10
PopMatters	8/10 stars
Record Collector	3/5 stars
The Rolling Stone Album Guide	3/5 stars
Spin Alternative Record Guide	2/10

David Bowie has continued to attract mixed reviews from critics, with many criticising its lack of cohesiveness. Dave Thompson of AllMusic wrote: "'Space Oddity' aside, Bowie possessed very little in the way of commercial songs, and the ensuing album emerged as a dense, even rambling, excursion through the folky strains that were the last glimmering of British psychedelia." Douglas Wolk of Pitchfork found that Bowie presents numerous ideas throughout the record, but does not know what to do with them, writing, "he wears his influences on his sleeve and constantly overreaches for dramatic effect". Record Collector's Terry Staunton agreed, saying: "Space Oddity may be regarded as the singer's first 'proper' album, though its mish-mash of styles and strummy experiments suggest he was still trying to settle on an identity."

Reviewing its 40th anniversary remaster, Mike Schiller of PopMatters stated that although it's far from Bowie's best, the record as a whole is "not half bad", standing as a "landmark" in Bowie's catalogue, and offering a glimpse at a man transitioning into the artist we've come to know". Pitchfork's Stuart Berman found that the record's "prog-folk hymnals" were a precursor to the "artful glam-rock" sound that made Bowie a star. Reviewing for The Quietus, John Tatlock felt the album does not stand as Bowie's first proper album, nor does it stand out on its own merit. He concludes that "it captures its creator at a fascinating crossroads, and is much more than a fans-only curio". Rob Sheffield, in the Spin Alternative Record Guide (1995), considered the album to contain "overripe hippie ballads", with only "Space Oddity" as "a sign of things to come." The music writer Simon Reynolds wrote that the "rush-recorded" album, "centred around Bowie's twelve-string guitar", is arguably his worst album until the mid-1980s, adding: "The debut, charming and tuneful, conveys that Bowie's heart is in it, his delight in the jokes and play-acting palpable. None of that comes through in the second album."

[Space Oddity is] kind of iffy, in that musically it never really had a direction...I don't think that I, as the artist, had a focus about where it should go.

— David Bowie, 2000

Biographers have differing views on David Bowie. While Buckley calls it "the first Bowie album proper", NME editors Roy Carr and Charles Shaar Murray have said, "Some of it belonged in '67 and some of it in '72, but in 1969 it all seemed vastly incongruous. Basically, David Bowie can be viewed in retrospect as all that Bowie had been and a little of what he would become, all jumbled up and fighting for control..." Trynka similarly states that the record has an "endearing lack of artifice", making it a "unique" entry in the artist's catalogue. Pegg calls the album "a remarkable step forward from anything Bowie had recorded before". He highlights "Unwashed and Somewhat Slightly Dazed", "Wild Eyed Boy from Freecloud" and "Cygnet Committee" as showcasing Bowie's evolution as a lyricist, but ultimately believes the "monolithic reputation" of "Space Oddity" does the album more harm than good. Spitz opines that while it is not as iconic as his 1970s works. Space Oddity "is first-rate as trippy rock records go". Sandford writes that "Space Oddity" aside, the record lacks a "voice", "punch" and "clarity", finding the songs vary from "mundane" (the two tributes to Farthingale) and "mawkish" ("God Knows I'm Good"), but ultimately finds moments of brilliance like his 1967 debut, naming "Unwashed and Somewhat Slightly Dazed" and "Janine". It was voted number 698 in the third edition of Colin Larkin's All Time Top 1000 Albums.

== Reissues ==
David Bowie was first released on CD by RCA in 1984. In keeping with the 1970 Mercury release and the 1972 RCA reissue, "Don't Sit Down" remained missing. The German (for the European market) and Japanese (for the US market) masters were sourced from different tapes and not identical for each region. In 1990, the album was reissued by Rykodisc/EMI with "Don't Sit Down" included as an independent song and three bonus tracks. This release, titled Space Oddity, used the 1972 cover photograph as its cover, while also incorporating a reproduction of the 1970 US front cover. It was issued again in 1999 by EMI/Virgin, without bonus tracks but with 24-bit digitally remastered sound and again including a separately listed "Don't Sit Down". The Space Oddity name was retained, while the original UK portrait was restored.

In 2009, the album was released by EMI/Virgin, under its original David Bowie title, as a remastered 2-CD special edition, with a second bonus disc compilation of unreleased demos, stereo versions, previously released B-sides, and BBC Radio session tracks. "Don't Sit Down" was again a hidden track. The 2009 remaster became available on vinyl for the first time in June 2020, in a picture disc release (with artwork based on the 1972 RCA reissue). Other reissues that have followed used the original David Bowie title and kept the UK artwork. In 2015, the album was remastered for the Five Years (1969–1973) box set. It was released in CD, vinyl and digital formats, both as part of this compilation and separately.

In 2019, David Bowie was remixed by Visconti, and released, with the Space Oddity title, in the CD boxed set Conversation Piece, and separately in CD, vinyl and digital formats. The new version of the album added the outtake "Conversation Piece" to the regular sequencing of the album for the first time, while omitting "Don't Sit Down".

== Track listing ==
All tracks are written by David Bowie.

Side one
No.	Title	Length
1.	"Space Oddity"	5:13
2.	"Unwashed and Somewhat Slightly Dazed"	6:09
3.	"Don't Sit Down"	0:39
4.	"Letter to Hermione"	2:30
5.	"Cygnet Committee"	9:22

Side two
No.	Title	Length
6.	"Janine"	3:22
7.	"An Occasional Dream"	2:54
8.	"Wild Eyed Boy from Freecloud"	4:46
9.	"God Knows I'm Good"	3:17
10.	"Memory of a Free Festival"	7:06

== Personnel ==
Album credits per the 2009 reissue liner notes and the biographer Nicholas Pegg.

- David Bowie – vocals, acoustic guitar, stylophone ("Space Oddity"), chord organ ("Memory of a Free Festival"), kalimba
- Tim Renwick – electric guitar, flute, recorder
- Keith Christmas – acoustic guitar
- Mick Wayne – guitar
- Rick Wakeman – Mellotron, electric harpsichord
- Tony Visconti – bass guitar, flute, recorder
- Herbie Flowers – bass guitar
- John "Honk" Lodge – bass guitar
- John Cambridge – drums
- Terry Cox – drums
- Benny Marshall and friends – harmonica, backing vocals ("Memory of a Free Festival")
- Paul Buckmaster – cello

Production

- Tony Visconti – producer
- Gus Dudgeon – producer ("Space Oddity")
- Ken Scott – engineer
- Malcolm Toft – engineer
- Barry Sheffield – engineer

== Charts ==
Chart performance for David Bowie
Year	Chart	Peak Position
1972	Australian Albums (Kent Music Report)	21
1972	UK Albums (Official Charts)	17
1973	Canadian Albums (RPM)	13
1973	Finnish Albums (Suomen virallinen lista)	27
1973	Spanish Albums (Promusicae)	8
1973	US Billboard Top LPs & Tape	16
2016	French Albums (SNEP)	105
2016	Irish Albums (IRMA)	84
2016	Italian Albums (FIMI)	60
2016	Swiss Albums (Schweizer Hitparade)	66
2019	Spanish Albums (Promusicae)	68
2020	Belgian Albums (Ultratop Flanders)	60
2020	Belgian Albums (Ultratop Wallonia)	132
2020	German Albums (Offizielle Top 100)	63
2020	Hungarian Albums (MAHASZ)	11

== Certifications ==
Certifications for Space Oddity
Region	Certification	Certified units/sales
United Kingdom (BPI)	Gold	100,000^{‡}
^{‡} Sales+streaming figures based on certification alone.
