= The Width of a Circle =

Song by David Bowie

from the album The Man Who Sold the World
- Released: 4 November 1970 (US); April 1971 (UK)
- Recorded: 18 April – 22 May 1970
- Studio: Trident and Advision, London
- Genre: Blues rock; heavy metal; progressive rock
- Length: 8:05
- Label: Mercury
- Songwriter: David Bowie
- Producer: Tony Visconti

"The Width of a Circle" is a song written by the English musician David Bowie in 1969 for his 1970 album, The Man Who Sold the World. Recorded during the spring of 1970, it was released later that year in the United States and in April 1971 in the UK. The opening track on the album, it features hard rock and heavy metal overtones. Bowie had performed a shorter version of the song in concerts for several months before recording it.

Featuring Mick Ronson's lead guitar work and occasional choral effects from the band, this 8-minute song is divided into two parts. The music takes on a heavy R&B quality in the second half, where the narrator enjoys a sexual encounter – with God, the Devil or some other supernatural being, according to different interpretations – in the depths of Hell.

== Live versions ==
Several live versions of the song have been released:

- A 10-minute, 43-second version recorded at Santa Monica Civic Auditorium on 20 October 1972 has been released on Santa Monica '72 and Live Santa Monica '72.
- A 9-minute edited version recorded at the Hammersmith Odeon, London, on 3 July 1973 was released on Ziggy Stardust – The Motion Picture in 1983, the complete 16-minute performance being issued on the 30th Anniversary 2CD Special Edition in 2003. The additional length, featuring an extended instrumental break by Mick Ronson and the band, allowed for Bowie's costume change, a common occurrence during the Ziggy Stardust tours.
- A version from Bowie's 1974 North American tour was released on David Live in 1974.
- A version recorded with the Tony Visconti Trio (also known as The Hype) on The Sunday Show on 5 February 1970, introduced by John Peel, was released on Bowie at the Beeb in 2000.

== Other releases ==
The song appeared on the Japanese compilation The Best of David Bowie in 1974.

The box set The Width of a Circle, released posthumously in 2021, features an early recording of the song from The Sounds of the 70s: Andy Ferris.

== Cover versions ==
- Spurge – Crash Course for the Ravers – A Tribute to the Songs of David Bowie (1996)
- The Spiders from Mars – The Mick Ronson Memorial Concert (2001); the Spiders here consisting of Joe Elliott (vocals, acoustic guitar), Trevor Bolder (bass), Woody Woodmansey, (drums), Billy Rankin (guitar), and Nicky Graham (piano)

== Personnel ==
According to biographer Chris O'Leary:

- David Bowie – lead vocal, 12-string acoustic guitar
- Mick Ronson – lead guitar, acoustic guitar, backing vocal
- Tony Visconti – bass, backing vocal
- Mick Woodmansey – drums, timpani

Technical

- Tony Visconti – producer
- Ken Scott – engineer
- Gerald Chevin – engineer

== Sources ==
- O'Leary, Chris (2015). Rebel Rebel: All the Songs of David Bowie from '64 to '76. Winchester: Zero Books. ISBN 978-1-78099-244-0.
- Pegg, Nicholas, The Complete David Bowie, Reynolds & Hearn Ltd, 2000, ISBN 1-903111-14-5
