= Ziggy Stardust and the Spiders from Mars (film) =

1983 documentary by D. A. Pennebaker

- Theatrical release poster
- Directed by: D. A. Pennebaker
- Produced by: Edith Van Slyck; Tony Defries
- Starring: David Bowie; Mick Ronson; Trevor Bolder; Mick Woodmansey; Angie Bowie
- Cinematography: Nick Doob; Randy Franken
- Edited by: Lorry Whitehead
- Music by: David Bowie
- Production companies: Miramax Films; MainMan; Bewlay Bros.
- Distributed by: Thorn EMI Screen Entertainment
- Release dates: 31 August 1979 (Edinburgh International Film Festival); 23 December 1983 (United Kingdom)
- Running time: 90 minutes
- Country: United Kingdom
- Language: English

Ziggy Stardust and the Spiders from Mars: The Motion Picture

Video by David Bowie
- Released: 23 December 1983 (re-released 1998, 2003 and 2023)
- Recorded: 3 July 1973
- Genre: Concert film
- Length: 90 minutes 103 minutes (2023 release)
- Labels: MGM, RCA/Columbia (1984 release); Image Entertainment (1998 re-release EMI/Virgin (2003 re-release)
- Director: D. A. Pennebaker

David Bowie chronology
Serious Moonlight (1984)	Ziggy Stardust and the Spiders from Mars: The Motion Picture (1983)	Glass Spider (1988)

Ziggy Stardust and the Spiders from Mars (sometimes called Bowie 1973) is a 1979 British documentary/concert film by D. A. Pennebaker. It features English singer-songwriter David Bowie and his backing group the Spiders from Mars performing at the Hammersmith Odeon in London on 3 July 1973, the final date of his Ziggy Stardust Tour. At this show, Bowie made the sudden surprise announcement that the show would be "the last show that we'll ever do", later understood to mean that he was retiring his Ziggy Stardust persona.

The full-length 90-minute film spent years in post-production before finally having its theatrical premiere at the Edinburgh Film Festival on 31 August 1979. Prior to the premiere, the 35 mm film had been shown in 16 mm format a few times, mostly in United States college towns. A shortened 60-minute version was broadcast once in the USA on ABC-TV in October 1974.

In 1983, the film was finally theatrically released worldwide, corresponding with the release of its soundtrack album entitled Ziggy Stardust: The Motion Picture. The following year, in 1984, the film was released to home video under the title, Ziggy Stardust and the Spiders from Mars: The Motion Picture. It was first released on DVD in 1998. A digitally remastered 30th Anniversary Edition DVD, including additional material from the live show and extras, was released in 2003.

A 4K remaster, which re-incorporates Jeff Beck's performances, was released in July 2023.

== Background ==
Early in 1972, Bowie had taken the stage persona of Ziggy Stardust, a science fiction-based, theatrical, enigmatic, androgynous character, and produced two hit albums during this period. By July 1973, the Ziggy Stardust Tour had taken Bowie to promote his albums for nearly a year without a break. The 3 July show at the Hammersmith Odeon was the last show on the tour, which also promoted his 1973 album Aladdin Sane and the 60th gig in a tour of Britain that had started on 12 May, though an American tour was already being booked for the autumn. Very few people knew that Bowie had decided to drop the Ziggy persona and stop performing for a while. Within his own entourage, Bowie had told only his then-manager Tony DeFries and one member of his band, Mick Ronson.

Near the end of the evening, in a "Farewell Speech" aptly just before the song "Rock 'n' Roll Suicide", Bowie announced, "Of all the shows on this tour, this particular show will remain with us the longest, because not only is it the last show of the tour, but it's the last show that we'll ever do." The phrasing was deliberately ambiguous, but most of the audience and many newspapers and magazines took it to mean that Bowie was retiring from music. In fact, he had killed off his Ziggy persona but not his music career.

== Production ==
Pennebaker had previously directed several well-received music documentaries, including the concert film Monterey Pop (1968) and the Bob Dylan tour documentary Dont Look Back (1967). According to Pennebaker, RCA had sent him to film part of the show as a promo for a new video disc product the company was developing, and he had originally intended to film a few songs for approximately 20 minutes. Pennebaker had only scant knowledge of Bowie's music, apart from Space Oddity, and initially thought he was going to be filming Marc Bolan. After seeing Bowie's 2 July London show and the next morning's rehearsal, Pennebaker was impressed by Bowie's onstage charisma and the range of his songs. He quickly prepared to film the entire 3 July show, realising that "there was a full-length film here asking to be made". MainMan, Bowie's management company, reportedly "paid a small fortune" to finance the film, which they hoped to recoup through a theatrical release soon after the tour.

Pennebaker stated in a 2016 interview and on the commentary track for the 2003 DVD film release that he did not have advance knowledge of Bowie's "last show" announcement (called the "Farewell Speech" in the track lists for the film and soundtrack album). However, Dylan Jones in his 2012 book When Ziggy Played Guitar: David Bowie and the Four Minutes That Shook the World quoted Pennebaker as saying that "RCA said, we have this guy and he's going to do a concert, maybe the last one he's going to do, and you've got to go make a film."

During the filming, Pennebaker struggled with poor stage lighting and having only three people to shoot the concert (plus a fourth camera that was not used very much because it was too far away from the stage). He attempted to overcome these problems by focusing many shots tightly on Bowie, who was in a spotlight; filming the fans in attendance to capture the "frenzy" of the concert; and requesting that attendees take as many flash photographs as possible during the concert to provide additional light. Recording the sound also presented challenges, with Pennebaker having to conceal additional microphones onstage and in the mixing board, and integrate the sound of the audience, recorded with a stereo pair of microphones, with the audio from the concert stage.

Despite these techniques, Pennebaker has acknowledged that the resulting film was "very sloppy". According to film critic Phil Hall, it remained in post-production for years "due to Pennebaker's inability to achieve an adequate soundtrack mix". Bowie, having abandoned the Ziggy Stardust character and moved on, was less than responsive to the filmmakers' requests for his post-production input, later saying that Ziggy Stardust "was something that I couldn't look at for years...I was so fed up with [Ziggy]." By the early 1980s, Bowie had overcome his reluctance enough to consider the film a "funny film" due to his Ziggy-era style of dress, and to work with Tony Visconti on remixing the soundtrack, saying "I don't know what I was on when I did it the first time".

Jeff Beck accepted an invitation to appear with the band, without knowing the show would be filmed. He played guitar on three songs, two of them forming a medley. Beck appeared in the version of the film shown on ABC-TV in 1974, but was removed from the final cut of the film at his own request, with the three songs on which he played being cut from the film. Sources have variously said that Beck was not happy with his performance and/or his clothes, and that he was concerned about possible harm to his image from appearing in a glam rock film.

Pennebaker had experimental filmmaker Robert Breer rotoscope Bowie for possible inclusion into the film. The rotoscoping was completed, but not used in the film.

== Release ==
After completing the film, the filmmakers arranged some screenings of a 16 mm version, mostly in American college towns, but did not release the film to theatres. In an effort to recoup some of the sizable production costs, the film was leased to ABC-TV, which broadcast a shortened 60-minute version of the film to U.S. audiences on 25 October 1974, as an episode of the network's regular series In Concert.

Pennebaker has said that he had difficulty finding a distributor for the Ziggy Stardust film, which was necessary because RCA had commissioned the film as a short product test with no plans to distribute it, and Pennebaker at that time lacked the knowledge or ability to distribute the film himself. According to Pennebaker, distributors disliked handling this type of film, and changes in the distribution system had made it more difficult to get an independent film into theaters.

The full 90-minute, 35 mm film finally made its world premiere on 31 August 1979 at the Edinburgh Film Festival. In 1983, it was released to theatres worldwide and also to the home video market as Ziggy Stardust and the Spiders from Mars: The Motion Picture, coinciding with the release of a live concert soundtrack album entitled Ziggy Stardust: The Motion Picture. Hall wrote that plans for a theatrical release in the late 1980s were cancelled in favor of a "quickie video release". However, the film did play in cinemas in 1983 and 1984, including at the 8th Street Playhouse in New York City in December 1983 before circulating through the U.S. midnight movie circuit.

In August 1984, MGM and RCA/ Columbia released VHS and Betamax versions of the film. Other home video formats included a 1984 RCA "Selectavision" disc and a 1985 Japanese laserdisc.

In 1998, a DVD version was first released by Image Entertainment, which did not include any extras. A digitally remastered 30th Anniversary Edition DVD was released by EMI/Virgin in 2003, which featured remixed sound by Tony Visconti that removed some overdubs created for the 1983 version and restored the stereo mix of the audience. The DVD also included extras such as a director's commentary track. The film was also briefly re-released to theatres in 2002, in anticipation of the 2003 DVD release.

A 2023 re-release, remastered in 4k and overseen by Pennebaker among others, re-incorporated the songs performed by Beck during the show (including "The Jean Genie"), a 5.1 audio mix and a 1-hour 42-minute runtime. The film also features a brief cameo by Ringo Starr.

== Track listing ==
The complete track listing below appears on the 2003 30th Anniversary DVD release. All releases of the film prior to 2023 omit the three songs on which guest artist Jeff Beck played just before Bowie's "farewell speech": "The Jean Genie/Love Me Do" and "Round and Round".

1. Opening Credits/Intro – Incorporating Beethoven's Ninth Symphony arranged and performed by Wendy Carlos from A Clockwork Orange
2. "Hang On to Yourself" (Bowie) from the album The Rise and Fall of Ziggy Stardust and the Spiders from Mars
3. "Ziggy Stardust" (Bowie) from the album The Rise and Fall of Ziggy Stardust and the Spiders from Mars
4. "Watch That Man" (Bowie) from the album Aladdin Sane
5. "Wild Eyed Boy from Freecloud" (Bowie) from the album Space Oddity
6. "All the Young Dudes" (Bowie) originally penned for Mott the Hoople
7. "Oh! You Pretty Things" (Bowie) from the album Hunky Dory
8. "Moonage Daydream" (Bowie) from the album The Rise and Fall of Ziggy Stardust and the Spiders from Mars
9. "Changes" (Bowie) from the album Hunky Dory
10. "Space Oddity" (Bowie) from the album Space Oddity
11. "My Death" (Jacques Brel, Mort Shuman) from the Brel album La Valse à mille temps, originally written by Brel as "La Mort" and translated into English by Shuman and Eric Blau
12. "Cracked Actor" (Bowie) from the album Aladdin Sane
13. "Time" (Bowie) from the album Aladdin Sane
14. "The Width of a Circle" (Bowie) from the album The Man Who Sold the World
15. Band introduction – Spoken word
16. "Let's Spend the Night Together" (Mick Jagger, Keith Richards) from the Bowie album Aladdin Sane, originally performed by The Rolling Stones
17. "Suffragette City" (Bowie) from the album The Rise and Fall of Ziggy Stardust and the Spiders from Mars
18. "White Light/White Heat" (Lou Reed) from The Velvet Underground album White Light/White Heat
19. Farewell Speech – Spoken word
20. "Rock 'n' Roll Suicide" (Bowie) from the album The Rise and Fall of Ziggy Stardust and the Spiders from Mars
21. End Credits – Incorporating Pomp and Circumstance by Edward Elgar

== Cast ==
- David Bowie – lead vocals, guitar, harmonica
- Mick Ronson – lead guitar, vocals
- Trevor Bolder – bass guitar
- Mick 'Woody' Woodmansey – percussion and drums
- Angela Bowie (appears in some scenes, but does not perform)
- Ringo Starr (appears in some scenes, but does not perform)

Additional musicians:

- Ken Fordham – saxophone and flute
- Brian Wilshaw – saxophone and flute
- Geoffrey MacCormack – backing vocals, percussion
- John Hutchinson – guitar
- Mike Garson – piano, organ, Mellotron

Sound recording (original film, soundtrack album and DVD) mixed by Tony Visconti.

== Reception ==
The film has frequently been criticized for its technical defects, including its dark, grainy quality, sloppy framing of shots, and poor audio. At least one reviewer who made these criticisms wrote later that these defects were significantly improved for the 2003 DVD release. Bowie's performance in the film, especially during the first part of the show, has also been criticized as being stiff and lacking in enthusiasm, perhaps due to his loss of interest in his Ziggy persona.

Critical reaction to Pennebaker's inclusion of audience footage and audio has been mixed. Some have observed that it underscores the sense of intimacy between Bowie and his fans (for example, in the audio interaction between artist and audience members during the song "My Death"), defines a new performance space that includes the audience, and creates a cultural time capsule by preserving on film the fashion and style of Bowie concertgoers at that time. Others have complained that the intercutting between audience and stage is distracting and that too much footage of the fans, particularly emotional teenage girls, was included in the finished film.

Some praised Pennebaker's inclusion of some backstage scenes or lamented the film's having less backstage material than Dont Look Back. Eleanor Levy of Record Mirror wrote, "Despite the technical defects, what finally spoils the film are the cuts to the 'real' Bowie in his dressing room...Such scenes are intrusive. They interrupt the magic of the performance, break into the illusion and destroy the fantasy. It wasn't David Bowie the people went to see, but the Ziggy persona, and all that went with it." Review aggregator website Rotten Tomatoes gives the film a rating of 73% based on 41 reviews, and an average grade of 6.4/10. The 2023 remaster received a five-out-of-five star rating from The Guardian's Peter Bradshaw, commending the film for presenting a "new raw intimacy" in the "familiar" songs.

The initial 1983 home video release of the film was popular with viewers, reaching number 1 on the UK video charts and number 30 on the U.S. videocassette charts. The 2002 theatrical re-release of the film grossed approximately $162,500 domestically.
