= Lady Grinning Soul =

Song by David Bowie

from the album Aladdin Sane
- Released: 19 April 1973 (Note: There is some debate about the release date. Previously reported as 13 April 1973, in 2018, Bowie's official website stated that new evidence had come to light proving that the official release date was 20 April 1973, but because this was Good Friday (a public holiday in the UK), the album was made available on 19 April. According to Benoît Clerc's book David Bowie All the Songs (2022), the US release date was 13 April and the UK release date was 19 April.)
- Recorded: January 1973
- Studio: Trident, London
- Genre: Art rock, glam rock
- Length: 3:46
- Label: RCA
- Songwriter: David Bowie
- Producers: Ken Scott, David Bowie

"Lady Grinning Soul" is a song by the English musician David Bowie, released on the album Aladdin Sane in 1973. It was a last-minute addition, replacing the "sax version" of "John, I'm Only Dancing" as the closing track. The composer's first meeting with American soul singer Claudia Lennear in 1972 is often cited as the inspiration for the song. In 2016, after Bowie's death, an interview with Lennear revealed that Bowie called her in 2014, and told her the song had been written about her.

The style of the piece has been compared to a James Bond theme. Pianist Mike Garson described his own performance as "about as romantic as it gets ... French with a little Franz Liszt thrown in there". Rolling Stone's contemporary review called Bowie's singing "the album's most expansive and sincere vocal", while author Nicholas Pegg considers the track "one of Bowie's most underrated recordings ... quite unlike anything else he has ever done". Mojo magazine listed it as Bowie's 93rd best track in 2015.

The track was used in the films The Runaways (2010) and Diana Vreeland: The Eye Has to Travel (2012).

== Recording ==
With the release of his album The Rise and Fall of Ziggy Stardust and the Spiders from Mars and his performance of "Starman" on the BBC television programme Top of the Pops in early July 1972, David Bowie was launched to stardom. To support the album, Bowie embarked on the Ziggy Stardust Tour in both the UK and the US. He composed most of the tracks for the follow-up record on the road during the US tour in late 1972. Because of this, many of the tracks were influenced by America, and his perceptions of the country.

"Lady Grinning Soul" was recorded at Trident Studios in London in January 1973, following the conclusion of the American tour and a series of Christmas concerts in England and Scotland. Like the rest of its parent album, the song was co-produced by Bowie and Ken Scott and featured Bowie's backing band the Spiders from Mars – comprising guitarist Mick Ronson, bassist Trevor Bolder and drummer Woody Woodmansey, as well as pianist Mike Garson and saxophonist Ken Fordham.

== Other releases ==
"Lady Grinning Soul" was released as the B-side of several of Bowie's singles, including "Let's Spend the Night Together" in June 1973, the Spanish release of the single "Sorrow" in November 1973, the Japanese release of the single "1984" in April 1974, and the US release of the single "Rebel Rebel" in May 1974.

== Cover versions ==
- Chris Brokaw – The Hand That Wrote This Letter (2017)
- Anna Calvi – Strange Weather (EP) (2014)
- Ulf Lundell – Sweethearts (Swedish translation called "Elden")
- Janette Mason performed it on her 2014 album D'Ranged
- Lucia Micarelli – Instrumental version on Music From a Farther Room (2004)
- Momus – Turpsycore (2015)
- Mystéfy - Spark Within (2016)
- Camille O'Sullivan – Changeling (2012)
- Paul Roberts – Faith (1999)
- Petra Taylor - Cover Ups (2019)
- Mireya featuring Gaby Moreno - Lady Grinning Soul (2020)

== Personnel ==
According to Chris O'Leary:

- David Bowie – lead vocal, 12-string acoustic guitar
- Mick Ronson – lead and rhythm guitar
- Trevor Bolder – bass
- Woody Woodmansey – drums
- Mike Garson – piano
- Ken Fordham – baritone saxophone

Technical

- David Bowie – producer
- Ken Scott – producer, engineer

== Cultural influence ==
In 2015 artist Tanja Stark noted Carl Jung's concept of Anima was a renaming of what Nobel Prize winning poet Carl Spitteler called 'My Lady Soul'. Proposing a conceptual link to [My] "Lady Grinning Soul" with its 'anima-esque' tone she argues Bowie's inclusion of Jung in the lyrics of "Drive-In Saturday", (another track on Aladdin Sane) and his articulation of the Anima archetype during interviews demonstrate familiarity and fascination with Jungian ideas at that time (and beyond).

== See also ==
- Music of the James Bond series (inspiration)
