= Rock 'n' Roll with Me =

1974 song by David Bowie

"Rock 'n' Roll With Me"

Song by David Bowie

from the album Diamond Dogs
- Released: 24 May 1974
- Recorded: January 1974
- Genre: Glam rock; soul; R&B
- Length: 3:57
- Label: RCA
- Songwriter(s): David Bowie; Geoff MacCormack
- Producer(s): David Bowie

"Rock 'n' Roll With Me"

Single by David Bowie

from the album David Live
- B-side: "Panic in Detroit"
- Released: September 1974 (US)
- Recorded: Philadelphia, July 1974
- Genre: Rock; glam rock; soul; R&B
- Length: 4:15
- Label: RCA; PB 10105 (US)
- Songwriter(s): David Bowie; Geoff MacCormack
- Producer(s): David Bowie

David Bowie singles chronology
"Knock on Wood" (1974)	"Rock 'n' Roll With Me" (1974)	"Young Americans" (1975)

"Rock 'n' Roll with Me" is a power ballad written by David Bowie and Geoff MacCormack and recorded in January 1974 that first appeared on Bowie's eighth studio album Diamond Dogs, supposedly to address the artist's complex relation with his fans. A version recorded during the Diamond Dogs Tour in July 1974 was released on the album David Live.

While the song "Knock on Wood" from David Live was issued as a single in the UK, "Rock 'n' Roll With Me" was chosen for release as the US single (RCA PB 10105) in September 1974, in response to Donovan's recent cover version. The B-side in each case was another live recording from the Diamond Dogs tour, "Panic in Detroit", originally from Aladdin Sane (1973). An edited version was issued on a US promotional single (RCA JB 10105) that same month.

Like "Rebel Rebel", the lead single from Diamond Dogs, "Rock 'n' Roll With Me" was conceived as part of a never-produced Ziggy Stardust musical in 1973. It has been described as "one of Bowie's least self-conscious love songs" and a foretaste of the R&B balladry on Young Americans (1975).

Cash Box said of the live single that "the spontaneity of Bowie's performance comes across with some heavy instrumentation and Bowie's inimitable vocal style."

On 27 July 2016, a remastered version of the 1974 live promo single edit was posted online to promote the upcoming compilation Who Can I Be Now? (1974–1976). Subsequently, this version was included on Re:Call 2, part of the compilation.

== Writing ==
The song was composed at Bowie's house located on Oakley Street, London, after Warren Peace (Geoff MacCormack) started playing chords on his piano. Bowie and Peace were inspired by Fats Domino and Little Richard, two rhythm and blues musicians they listened to during their childhood.

Musically, the song is a power ballad with a nod to soul music, specifically recalling Bill Withers' "Lean on Me" from 1972 in the piano intro.

== Track listing ==
1. "Rock 'n' Roll With Me" (lyrics by David Bowie; music by Bowie, Warren Peace) – 4:15
2. "Panic in Detroit" (Bowie) – 5:41

== Personnel ==
According to Chris O'Leary:

- David Bowie – lead vocal, 12-string acoustic guitar, lead guitar, baritone saxophone
- Herbie Flowers – bass
- Mike Garson – piano, organ, tambourine?
- Aynsley Dunbar – drums
- Geoff MacCormack – backing vocals, tambourine?

Technical

- David Bowie – producer
- Keith Harwood – engineer

== Live versions ==
- The July 1974 live recording, released as a single and on David Live, also appeared on the Dutch release Rock Concert.
- A live version recorded in September 1974 (previously available on the unofficial album A Portrait in Flesh) was released in 2017 on Cracked Actor (Live Los Angeles '74).
- A live performance from October 1974 was released in 2020 on I'm Only Dancing (The Soul Tour 74).

== Cover versions ==
- Donovan – Released only as a single A-side (b/w "Divine Daze of Deathless Delight", September 1974, Epic EPC 2661). This was also issued on the compilation album Oh! You Pretty Things, which is composed of early cover versions of Bowie's work. Cash Box said "a rock 'n roll ballad in the glorious Bowie tradition features some lush orchestration to cushion the inimitable Donovan vocal style which has always been a captivating source of musical expression." Record World said that it "strews glitter garlands on [Donovan's] comeback course.
