= Cracked Actor (song) =

Song by David Bowie

from the album Aladdin Sane
- Released: 19 April 1973 (Note: There is some debate about the release date. Previously reported as 13 April 1973, in 2018, Bowie's official website stated that new evidence had come to light proving that the official release date was 20 April 1973, but because this was Good Friday (a public holiday in the UK), the album was made available on 19 April. According to Benoît Clerc's book David Bowie All the Songs (2022), the US release date was 13 April and the UK release date was 19 April.)
- Recorded: January 1973
- Studio: Trident, London
- Genre: Hard rock; glam rock
- Length: 2:56
- Label: RCA
- Songwriter: David Bowie
- Producers: Ken Scott, David Bowie

"Cracked Actor" is a song by the English musician David Bowie, released on his sixth studio album Aladdin Sane (1973). The track was also issued as a single in Eastern Europe by RCA Records in June that year. The song was written during Bowie's stay in Los Angeles during the American leg of the Ziggy Stardust Tour in October 1972. Co-produced by Bowie and Ken Scott, it was recorded in January 1973 at Trident Studios in London with his backing band the Spiders from Mars – comprising Mick Ronson, Trevor Bolder and Woody Woodmansey. A hard rock song primarily led by guitar, the song describes an aging Hollywood star's encounter with a prostitute, featuring many allusions to sex and drugs.

Bowie performed the song frequently. For his 1974 Diamond Dogs Tour, he performed it wearing sunglasses and holding a skull, which he would proceed to French kiss. His biographers have compared the routine to Hamlet. Performances from this tour have appeared on the live albums David Live (1974) and Cracked Actor (Live Los Angeles '74) (2017). Bowie revived the skull-and-sunglasses routine for the 1983 Serious Moonlight Tour, a performance of which appears in the concert video Serious Moonlight (1984). "Cracked Actor" provided the name for a 1975 documentary of the same name, directed by Alan Yentob. It is notable for showing Bowie's declining mental state during this period, due to his growing cocaine addiction.

== Background and recording ==
With the release of his album The Rise and Fall of Ziggy Stardust and the Spiders from Mars and his performance of "Starman" on the BBC television programme Top of the Pops in early July 1972, David Bowie was launched to stardom. To support the album, Bowie embarked on the Ziggy Stardust Tour in both the UK and the US. He composed most of the tracks for the follow-up record on the road during the US tour in late 1972. Because of this, many of the tracks were influenced by America, and his perceptions of the country.

In October 1972, Bowie and an entourage of 46 people (including Mike Garson's family and Iggy Pop) stayed at the Beverly Hills Hotel on Sunset Boulevard in Los Angeles for a week. (Note: Bowie performed two concerts in Santa Monica on 20 and 21 October; the first performance was recorded and later released as the bootleg Santa Monica '72, which received an official release as Live Santa Monica '72 in 2008.) The entourage spent time at clubs and the hotel pool, accumulating a $20,000 hotel bill by the time they departed. "Cracked Actor" was written during this stay. It was primarily inspired by the numerous barely-teenage prostitutes and drugs that Bowie witnessed on Sunset Boulevard. According to author Peter Doggett, the song encompassed "three layers of prostitution" on the Boulevard: "offering money for sex; sex for drugs; worship for fame." Regarding the Boulevard's clients, Bowie recalled: "They were mostly older producer types, quite strange looking, quite charming, but thoroughly unreal."

"Cracked Actor" was recorded at Trident Studios in London in January 1973, following the conclusion of the American tour and a series of Christmas concerts in England and Scotland. Like the rest of its parent album, the song was co-produced by Bowie and Ken Scott and featured Bowie's backing band the Spiders from Mars – comprising guitarist Mick Ronson, bassist Trevor Bolder and drummer Woody Woodmansey.

== Music and lyrics ==
"Cracked Actor" has been described as hard rock and glam rock. The verses are in both A major and A minor, while the choruses are in G major. The track is primarily led by Ronson on guitar, who plays with loads of feedback; his performance is described by Pegg as "dirty blues".

Lyrically, "Cracked Actor" is about an aging Hollywood star in an encounter with a prostitute, the chorus including various allusions to sex and drugs:

Crack, baby, crack, show me you're real
Smack, baby, smack, is that all that you feel
Suck, baby, suck, give me your head
Before you start professing that you're knocking me dead

Rolling Stone suggested that Bowie's goal was "to strip the subject of his validity, as he has done with the rocker, as a step towards a re-definition of these roles and his own inhabiting of them". However NME writers Roy Carr and Charles Shaar Murray considered that the song "reveals little else except that Bowie's capabilities with a mouth-harp are decidedly limited". Some commentators have noted the Velvet Underground's Lou Reed as an influence, with biographer Paul Trynka highlighting the line "since he pinned you baby" as a "straight lift" from Reed.

== Release and aftermath ==
"Cracked Actor" was released on 19 April 1973 on Bowie's sixth studio album Aladdin Sane, sequenced as the fifth track—the final on side one of the original LP—between "Panic in Detroit" and "Time". Each track was ascribed a location on the album label to indicate where it was written or took its inspiration; "Cracked Actor" was ascribed to Los Angeles, California. Following its release on Aladdin Sane, "Cracked Actor" was issued as Bowie's first single for the Russian market, backed with "John, I'm Only Dancing". The timing was supposedly to cash in on publicity emanating from his trip through Eastern Europe on the Trans-Siberian Railway in April–May 1973, shortly before his final Ziggy Stardust tour in the UK.

"Cracked Actor" was performed live throughout the 1973 tour. A recording from the performance at the Hammersmith Odeon, London, on 3 July 1973 was released on Ziggy Stardust: The Motion Picture. For Bowie's 1974 Diamond Dogs Tour, he would performed the song wearing sunglasses and holding a skull (à la Hamlet), which he would then proceed to French kiss. Biographer Nicholas Pegg has given praise to the routine, stating: "not only did the Yorick affectation provide instant shorthand for everything actorish, but it reinforced the song's terror of ephemerality with Hamlet's own: 'let her paint an inch thick, to this favour she must come.'" Performances from this tour were released on David Live (1974) and Cracked Actor (Live Los Angeles '74) (2017), as well as the 1989 box set Sound + Vision.

In 1983, Bowie revived the song and the sunglasses-and-skull routine for his Serious Moonlight Tour. Biographer Chris O'Leary found these performances to be subpar, finding "he came off as an animatronic Disneyland exhibit." A performance recorded on 12 September 1983 was included on the live album Serious Moonlight (Live '83), which was part of the 2018 box set Loving the Alien (1983–1988) and was released separately the following year. The filmed performance appears on the concert video Serious Moonlight (1984). The song was performed live at the BBC Radio Theatre, Portland Place, London on 27 June 2000. This recording appeared on the limited edition bonus disk of Bowie at the Beeb.

"Cracked Actor" provided its name to a documentary chronicling Bowie's life in Los Angeles, using a mixture of sequences filmed in limousines, hotels and concert footage, most of which was taken from a show there at Universal Amphitheatre on 2 September 1974. Directed by Alan Yentob and broadcast in the UK on 26 January 1975, the documentary is notable for showing Bowie's declining mental state during this period because of his growing cocaine addiction. Although Cracked Actor has never received an official release, Pegg calls it "arguably the finest documentary made about David Bowie".

== Personnel ==
According to Kevin Cann and Chris O'Leary:

- David Bowie – lead vocal, harmonica
- Mick Ronson – lead and rhythm guitar, backing vocals
- Trevor Bolder – bass guitar
- Woody Woodmansey – drums, tambourine

Production

- David Bowie – producer
- Ken Scott – producer, engineer
