= The Prettiest Star =

1970 song by David Bowie

Single by David Bowie
- B-side: "Conversation Piece"
- Released: 6 March 1970
- Recorded: 8, 13 & 15 January 1970
- Studio: Trident (London)
- Length: 3:09
- Label: Mercury
- Songwriter: David Bowie
- Producer: Tony Visconti

David Bowie singles chronology
"Space Oddity" (1969)	"The Prettiest Star" (1970)	"Memory of a Free Festival" (1970)

"The Prettiest Star" is a song by the English musician David Bowie, originally released on 6 March 1970 through Mercury Records as the follow-up single to "Space Oddity". A love song for his soon-to-be wife Angie, it was recorded in January 1970 at Trident Studios in London and featured Marc Bolan on guitar, who was brought on by the producer Tony Visconti. Despite praise from music journalists, the single flopped and failed to chart. Years later, Bowie rerecorded the track for his 1973 album Aladdin Sane. On this more glam rock influenced take with lyrics matching themes on the album, Mick Ronson recreated Bolan's guitar part almost note-for-note. The remake was better received.

== Original version ==
=== Background and recording ===
David Bowie wrote "The Prettiest Star" as a love song for Angie Barnett, reputedly playing it down the telephone as part of his proposal to her on Christmas 1969. Following the release of his second studio album David Bowie (Space Oddity), it was the only new song he wrote over the winter of 1969. Commentators noted the lyric "you and I will rise up all the way" anticipated the couple's fame during the next decade. Set in the key of F major, the song is in the style of the Greek hasapiko dance as a tribute to Angie's Cypriot ethnic origin. Similar to Bowie's other compositions of the time, it was musically influenced by the songwriter Biff Rose's The Thorn in Mrs. Rose's Side (1968), particularly the track "Angel Tension", which contains a similar tempo, phrasing, chord changes and lyrics to "The Prettiest Star" (Bowie's "staying back in your memory" compared to Rose's "going back in memory"). The author Paul Trynka describes the track as "languid, uncharacteristically simple" and "an almost unique [addition] to Bowie's canon". The biographer Chris O'Leary finds the song "hummable, warm and sweet", although felt "its dragging tempo made its sentimentality leaden".

Marc came to the session for an hour, played his solo and left promptly. The atmosphere was very heavy. The only other time they played together was on that television program of Marc's.

— Tony Visconti, 1983

Recording for the song began at Trident Studios in London, in tandem with a new version of Bowie's Deram-era track "London Bye Ta-Ta", on 8 January 1970—Bowie's 23rd birthday—and completed on 13 and 15 January. It was produced by Tony Visconti, who hired the drummer Godfrey McLean and the bassist Delisle Harper of Gass, a funk Santana-like band, for the session; he had produced Gass's recent single, although he found Harper's playing inadequate and overdubbed a bass part himself. Visconti also brought Marc Bolan to guest on guitar, having produced Bolan's works with T. Rex; Bowie and Bolan would spend the next few years as rivals during the glam rock era. Bolan rehearsed his part extensively beforehand, as he wanted to showcase his newfound electric guitar skills. The recording atmosphere was reportedly fraught, Bolan being jealous at the success of "Space Oddity". Bowie recalled of the session: "I don't think we were talking to each other that day. I can't remember why, but I remember a strange atmosphere in the studio. We were never in the same room at the same time. You could cut the atmosphere with a knife." The guitarist was accompanied by his wife June, who voiced her disapproval, saying "the only good thing about this record is Marc's guitar". The couple left the studio shortly after.

=== Release and aftermath ===
After its recording, Bowie premiered "The Prettiest Star" live at a BBC radio session on 5 February 1970. To the displeasure of his manager Kenneth Pitt, Bowie chose the song as his next single, Pitt favouring "London Bye Ta-Ta"; (Note: "London Bye Ta-Ta" was initially the A-side but was replaced by "The Prettiest Star" by David and Angie at the last minute. Pitt was unaware until he received an advance pressing.) it ultimately marked the end of Pitt's influence on the artist. Bowie's label, Mercury Records, hoped the song would demonstrate Bowie's range as a songwriter. Issued as the follow-up single to "Space Oddity" in the United Kingdom only on 6 March 1970, with "Conversation Piece" as the B-side, its release coincided with The World of David Bowie compilation, which collected several songs and unreleased material from Bowie's time with Deram. The single received praise from music journalists. The NME hailed it as "a thoroughly charming and wholly fascinating little song ... the self-penned lyric is enchanting, if somewhat enigmatic – and the melody is haunting and hummable ... I like it immensely". Music Business Weekly described it as "an immediately infectious number and a very strong follow-up", Record Mirror commended "a melodic and interesting production", and Disc & Music Echo found it "a lovely, gentle, gossamer piece ... the most compact, catchy melody I've ever heard. A hit indeed."

Despite its acclaim, the single sold fewer than 800 copies and failed to chart. Bowie later said, "I think a lot of people were expecting another 'Space Oddity'." With the assistance of Space Oddity's photographer Vernon Dewhurst, he sent a promotional copy to French singer Sacha Distel, whose hit "Raindrops Keep Fallin' On My Head" was high in the charts, in hopes he would cover "The Prettiest Star", although he declined. Two weeks after the single's release, Bowie and Angie married on 19 March 1970. When the single flopped, Mercury suggested he rerecord the Space Oddity track "Memory of a Free Festival" for release as his next single, although this also failed to chart. By April, he began recording his next studio album, the hard rock and heavy metal-influenced The Man Who Sold the World (1970).

In subsequent decades, AllMusic's Ned Raggett opines that while "The Prettiest Star" itself does not stand as one of Bowie's best compositions, the recording itself is notable as the only properly recorded and released collaboration between Bowie and Bolan. The original mono single was included in the Sound + Vision box set in 1989 and on Re:Call 1, part of the Five Years (1969–1973) compilation, in 2015. An alternative mono mix, prepared for promotion in the US market by Tony Visconti but which went unused, was released for the first time in 2021 on the box set The Width of a Circle, along with a 2020 stereo mix of the original single by Visconti. A 1987 stereo mix by Tris Penna first appeared on The Best of David Bowie 1969/1974 in 1997, and was later included on the 2003 reissue of Sound + Vision and the 2009 expanded edition of Space Oddity. Apart from Bowie compilations, the original recording of "The Prettiest Star" was included on the 2002 career-spanning Bolan box set 20th Century Superstar, the 2007 compilation The Record Producers: Tony Visconti and the soundtrack of the 2005 film Kinky Boots.

== Aladdin Sane version ==
"The Prettiest Star"

Song by David Bowie

from the album Aladdin Sane
- Released: 19 April 1973 (Note: There is some debate about the release date. Previously reported as 13 April 1973, in 2018, Bowie's official website stated that new evidence had come to light proving that the official release date was 20 April 1973, but because this was Good Friday (a public holiday in the UK), the album was made available on 19 April. According to Benoît Clerc's book David Bowie All the Songs (2021), the US release date was 13 April and the UK release date was 19 April.)
- Recorded: December 1972, RCA (New York City) or January 1973, (Trident) London
- Genre: Glam rock
- Length: 3:31
- Label: RCA
- Songwriter: David Bowie
- Producers: Ken Scott, David Bowie

Official audio"The Prettiest Star" (2013 Remaster) on YouTube

Bowie recorded a more glam-influenced version of "The Prettiest Star" during the sessions for his 1973 album Aladdin Sane. Sources list the recording date and location as either in December 1972 at RCA Studios in New York City or January 1973 at Trident in London. Co-produced by Bowie and Ken Scott, the remake featured contributions from his backing band the Spiders from Mars—Mick Ronson (guitar), Trevor Bolder (bass) and Woody Woodmansey (drums)—as well as Mike Garson on piano, David Sanborn on tenor saxophone and Warren Peace on backing vocals and handclaps. On the album, released on 20 April 1973, the remake appeared as the second track on side two of the original LP, sequenced between "Time" and Bowie's version of the Rolling Stones' "Let's Spend the Night Together".

The more widely-known remake has elements of British music hall and 1950s doo-wop backing vocals, and Ronson recreates Bolan's original guitar part almost note-for-note. O'Leary opines that Ronson gave the remake "more grit" than the original, further saying that "if the first 'Prettiest Star' was a valentine, its remake was a rowdy engagement party". The guitarist Marco Pirroni said of Ronson's part in 1999 as "the best guitar sound ever ... [he] has got this brilliant, overdriven, mad guitar sound. I'm still trying to get that sound today." It is unclear why Bowie rerecorded it for Aladdin Sane, although the track's lyrical references to screen starlets and "the movies in the past" all fit the nostalgic Hollywood themes found throughout the rest of the album. The biographer David Buckley finds the remake superior to the original.

== Covers ==
The British singer Simon Turner covered "The Prettiest Star" in 1973 for his debut album, which went unsuccessful as a single, but later appeared on the 2006 compilation Oh! You Pretty Things. Another version by the singer Ian McCulloch was recorded in 2003 for Uncut magazine's Bowie tribute CD Starman. It also appeared as the B-side for his single "Love in Veins" the same year.

== Personnel ==
Original version

- David Bowie – lead vocals, acoustic guitar
- Marc Bolan – electric guitar
- Tony Visconti – bass guitar, string arrangement
- Godfrey McLean – drums
- Unknown musicians – organ, vibraphone, strings

Technical

- Tony Visconti – producer, arrangements
- Ken Scott – engineer
- Barry Sheffield – engineer

Aladdin Sane version

- David Bowie – lead vocals, acoustic guitar
- Mick Ronson – electric guitar, backing vocals
- Trevor Bolder – bass guitar
- Woody Woodmansey – drums
- Mike Garson – piano
- David Sanborn – tenor saxophone
- Warren Peace – backing vocals, handclaps

Technical

- David Bowie – producer
- Ken Scott – producer, engineer
- Mike Moran – engineer
