= Woody Woodmansey's U-Boat =

Woody Woodmansey's U-Boat was an English rock band, formed in 1976.

== History ==
Phil Murray and Dave Black were two members of a local Tyneside band. In 1975, Black was asked to replace Mick Ronson as lead guitarist in The Spiders from Mars, as they reformed after their David Bowie era. In 1976 Black left The Spiders, and put Murray in contact with Woody Woodmansey; and together with Phil Plant, Frankie Marshall and eventually Martin Smith, U-Boat came into being.

Signed to Bronze Records, their first album, U1, was recorded at the Roundhouse Recording Studios, and produced by Gerry Bron. Bron placed U-Boat as support band on the extensive 1977 Uriah Heep UK and European tour. Bron suggested that prefixing Woody Woodmansey's, to the name U-Boat, would for marketing purposes help sales, thus the name was edited just before release of the first album.

U-Boat broke attendance records at the Marquee Club during their five-week residency in the summer of 1977. The band were influential with many emerging punk outfits. Gary Numan was a fan, emerging with a remarkably similar group image during the "Are Friends Electric?" period. The Sex Pistols sent U-Boat a telegram to say that, regardless of not being invited, they would support U-Boat at the ill-fated 1976 Burstow Festival.

One of the last appearances U-Boat made was at the Reading Festival of 1977.

They had begun recording their second album, (to have been called U2), when friction between Woodmansey and their manager caused a damaging rift. Murray and Smith remained with the manager, whilst the other three formed another band. Murray signed to Private Stock Records, and then had three years signed to Mickie Most at RAK Records, before eventually embarking on a successful personal development book writing career.

The band's 1977 album, Woody Woodmansey's U-Boat, received a 1.5-star rating from AllMusic, whose reviewer Dave Thompson noted, "But across the course of an entire album, U Boat gives even the merciless submarine killers of World War Two a bad name. And, when it was finally scuppered, not even mad marine enthusiasts shed a tear for it's [sic] memory."
