= Panic in Detroit =

Song by David Bowie

from the album Aladdin Sane
- Released: 19 April 1973 (Note: There is some debate about the release date. Previously reported as 13 April 1973, in 2018, Bowie's official website stated that new evidence had come to light proving that the official release date was 20 April 1973, but because this was Good Friday (a public holiday in the UK), the album was made available on 19 April. According to Benoît Clerc's book David Bowie All the Songs (2022), the US release date was 13 April and the UK release date was 19 April.)
- Recorded: January 1973
- Studio: Trident, London
- Genre: Glam rock; hard rock
- Length: 4:25
- Label: RCA
- Songwriter: David Bowie
- Producers: Ken Scott, David Bowie

"Panic in Detroit" is a song written by the English singer-songwriter David Bowie for the album Aladdin Sane in 1973. Bowie based it on his friend Iggy Pop's descriptions of revolutionaries he had known in Michigan and Pop's experiences during the 1967 Detroit riots. Rolling Stone magazine called the track "a paranoid descendant of the Motor City's earlier masterpiece, Martha and the Vandellas' "Nowhere to Run"".

In 2003, Rolling Stone magazine printed its list of "The 100 Greatest Guitarists of All Time". Mick Ronson was ranked at number 64, and "Panic in Detroit" as his "essential recording".

== Recording ==
David Bowie was launched to stardom through the release of The Rise and Fall of Ziggy Stardust and the Spiders from Mars and his performance of "Starman" on the BBC television programme Top of the Pops in early July 1972. To support the album, Bowie embarked on the Ziggy Stardust Tour in both the UK and the US. He composed most of the tracks for the follow-up record on the road during the US tour in late 1972. Because of this, many of the tracks were influenced by America, and his perceptions of the country.

"Panic in Detroit" was written based on friend Iggy Pop's descriptions of revolutionaries he had known in Michigan, Pop's experiences during the 1967 Detroit riots and the rise of the White Panther Party, specifically their leader John Sinclair. "Panic in Detroit" was recorded at London's Trident Studios in January 1973, following the conclusion of the American tour and a series of Christmas concerts in England and Scotland. Like the rest of its parent album, the song was co-produced by Bowie and Ken Scott and featured Bowie's backing band the Spiders from Mars—guitarist Mick Ronson, bassist Trevor Bolder and drummer Woody Woodmansey—with backing vocals from Linda Lewis and Juanita Franklin.

A dispute arose between Bowie and Woodmansey during the recording, wherein the latter refused to play the former's desired Bo Diddley drum figure, reportedly arguing it was "too obvious". The drummer instead played sixteenth notes on his tom-toms, with crash cymbals on the chorus phrases. Bowie's friend Geoff MacCormack eventually added congas and maracas that achieved the effect. Biographer Nicholas Pegg says that the disagreement contributed to growing dissent between the singer and drummer, eventually leading to Woodmansey's firing later in the year.

== Music and lyrics ==
Musically "Panic in Detroit" has been described as a "Salsa variation on the Bo Diddley beat"; Pegg considers Ronson's guitar part very "bluesy". The lyrics namecheck Che Guevara and are also said to contain references to John Sinclair of the White Panther Party. Bowie compared the ideas of Sinclair to the rebel martyr Che Guevara for the narrator in "Panic in Detroit". The lyrics are very dark, featuring images of urban decay, violence, drugs, emotional isolation and suicide, adding to the album's overarching theme of alienation. Author Peter Doggett finds a thematic link between the song and Bob Dylan's "All Along the Watchtower", which "used a similar three-chord riff to underpin its apocalypse".

== Release ==
"Panic in Detroit" was released on Aladdin Sane on 20 April 1973, sequenced as the fourth track on side one of the original LP, between "Drive-In Saturday" and "Cracked Actor".

The song was later included in the Sound + Vision box set (1989) and on Best of Bowie (US/Canada edition 2002).

=== 1979 re-recording ===
Bowie recorded a new version of "Panic in Detroit" in December 1979, intended for broadcast for The "Will Kenny Everett Make It to 1980?" Show. It featured Zaine Griff on guitar, Andy Clark on piano, Tony Visconti on bass and backing vocals, and Andy Duncan on drums. The remake was dropped in favour of the acoustic of "Space Oddity" recorded in the same session. The "Panic in Detroit" remake was left unreleased until it appeared as a bonus track on the 1992 Rykodisc CD release of Scary Monsters (and Super Creeps), and later the bonus disc of Heathen (2002).

== Live versions ==
Bowie played "Panic in Detroit" during his concert tours, first added to the 1973 US leg of the Ziggy Stardust Tour. It appeared prominently throughout the Diamond Dogs Tour; one live version was released as the B-side of the 1974 single "Knock on Wood" before appearing on the Rare compilation in 1983, on the 2005 and subsequent reissues of David Live, and on Re:Call 2, part of the Who Can I Be Now? (1974–1976) compilation released in 2016. Another live recording from the tour was released on I'm Only Dancing (The Soul Tour 74) in 2020. The song was again played throughout the 1976 Isolar tour, a live performance from which was included on Live Nassau Coliseum '76, released as part of the 2010 reissues of the Station to Station album: the CD and vinyl releases featured a heavily edited 6:02 version, while the full-length 13:08 recording was offered as an exclusive download. The recording also appeared on Who Can I Be Now? (1974–1976). "Panic in Detroit" made further appearances on the 1990 Sound+Vision, 1997 Earthling and 2003–2004 A Reality tours.

== Personnel ==
According to Chris O'Leary:

Original version

- David Bowie – lead vocal, acoustic guitar
- Mick Ronson – lead and rhythm guitars
- Trevor Bolder – bass
- Woody Woodmansey – drums
- Aynsley Dunbar – percussion
- Juanita Franklin – backing vocals
- Linda Lewis – backing vocals
- Geoff MacCormack – backing vocals, congas, maracas, handclaps

Technical

- David Bowie – producer
- Ken Scott – producer, engineer

1979 re-recording

- David Bowie – lead vocal, 12-string acoustic guitar
- Zaine Griff – lead guitar
- Andy Clark – piano
- Tony Visconti – bass, backing vocals
- Andy Duncan – drums

Technical

- Tony Visconti – producer
