= Diamond Dogs Tour =

1974 concert tour by David Bowie

- Tour by David Bowie
- Poster to the concert in New York, USA
- Location: North America
- Associated album: Diamond Dogs
- Start date: 14 June 1974
- End date: 1 December 1974
- Legs: 3
- No. of shows: 78 (80 scheduled)

David Bowie concert chronology
- Ziggy Stardust Tour (1972–73); Diamond Dogs Tour (1974); Isolar – 1976 Tour (1976)

The Diamond Dogs Tour was a concert tour by the English singer-songwriter David Bowie in North America in 1974 to promote the studio album Diamond Dogs, which was released the same year. The first leg of the tour utilized a rock opera-style stage show format with multiple sets, costume changes, and choreography. The third leg of the tour was alternatively known as The Soul Tour, which included some songs from the forthcoming album Young Americans (1975) and featured a revamped, stripped-down presentation and different backing band.

== Tour preparation and details ==
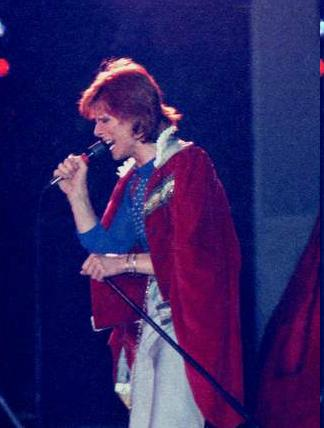
Bowie performing at Charlotte Coliseum in Charlotte, North Carolina, on 5 July 1974

Two months of rehearsals were required to get the tour ready, in part due to the elaborate set & props required for the show (reported to cost $275,000 per set, or about $1,750,000 today). Originally the tour was planned to appear in a city for five nights before moving on to the next city, but that plan was abandoned early on. The tour started in June 1974 in Montreal, Quebec as the "Diamond Dogs Tour" (although producer Tony DeFries demanded the tour be referred to as "The Year of the Diamond Dogs" when speaking with the press). Bowie recorded radio and television commercials for the tour, which played in advance of the tour's arrival in each city. The tour took the month of August 1974 off, during which time Bowie began recording his follow-up studio album, Young Americans. On 10 October 1974, after the tour had resumed, Bowie abandoned the extravagant theatrical set and re-branded the tour "The Soul Tour", which would continue through the end of the North American leg in December.

In 1987, Bowie recalled how difficult the tour was early on before changing it into the 'Soul Tour', saying "I was in a bad state of mind to have attempted that. It was pretty exciting, but I was so blocked [laughs], so stoned during the entire thing that I'm amazed I lasted with it even that one trip across America before I ditched it."

== Set design ==
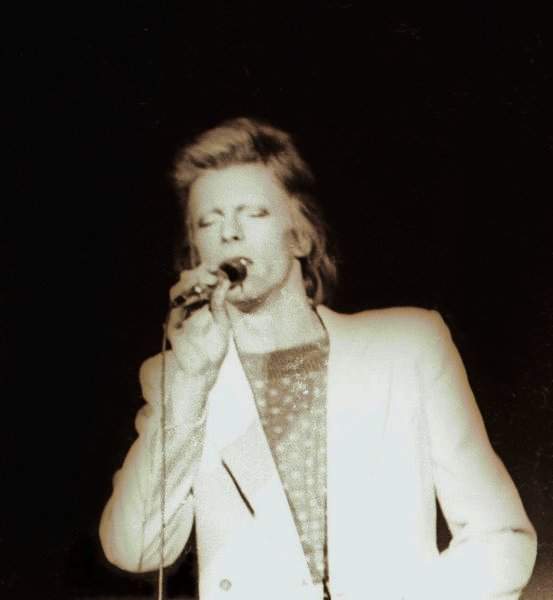
Bowie during the Diamond Dogs Tour on 5 July 1974 at the Charlotte Coliseum

The set for the theatrical Diamond Dogs tour was designed by Mark Ravitz, who later did the set for Bowie's 1987 Glass Spider Tour. The set was built to resemble a city (called "Hunger City"), weighed 6 tons and incorporated over 20,000 moving parts including a variety of props (such as streetlamps, chairs and catwalks). The props themselves weren't ready for use until a mere 6 days before the show opened, which led to a variety of technical problems during the tour: a movable catwalk collapsed once during the tour with Bowie on it. The set was at least partially based on work by German artist George Grosz. The use of full-stage lighting for the tour was considered "revolutionary" and it was called the first time a rock star had hired a team of Broadway designers to light the whole stage.

In 1990, while preparing for his Sound+Vision Tour, Bowie recalled the difficulties faced by the show, saying it "was good fun and dangerous, with the equipment breaking down and the bridges falling apart on stage. I kept getting stuck out over the audience's heads, on the hydraulic cherry picker, after the finish of 'Space Oddity.'" Other props worked as expected: for the song "Big Brother", Bowie sang while atop a multi-mirrored glass "asylum", emerging during the next song ("Time") sitting in the palm of a giant hand covered in small light bulbs.

The show in Tampa, Florida, was performed without any of the stage props because the truck driver driving those components ended up in a highway ditch after being stung by a bee.

In 1987, while preparing for the Glass Spider Tour (which picked up theatrically where the Diamond Dogs tour left off and was also designed by Ravitz), Bowie recalled about the extraordinary nature of the set he used during this tour, saying "We had four skyscrapers on stage, with bridges that went backwards and forward and would go up and down. The whole thing was built on a city pretext. I had dancers working with me and it was choreographed and was a real fantastic musical event. I thoroughly enjoyed working like that."

== Live recordings ==
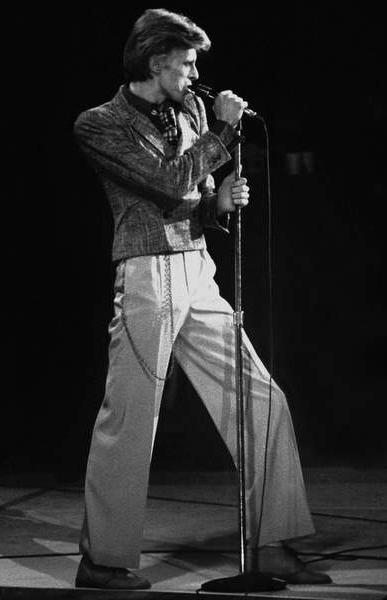
Performing at the Washington DC Capital Centre on 11 November 1974, during the "Soul Tour" phase of the tour

MainMan, Bowie's management team, planned to cull a live album from the July 1974 performances at the Tower Theater just outside Philadelphia. When the band learned of this, they demanded to be paid a standard recording fee of $5000 per musician in addition to their normal pay or they would refuse to perform. They were given checks hours before show time, and the concert recording went on as planned. The resulting double album, titled David Live, became Bowie's first official live album.

A Portrait in Flesh, a bootleg of the 5 September 1974 show in Los Angeles was released in Australia. An official version of the 5 September 1974 show, mixed by Tony Visconti in 2016, was first released as Cracked Actor (Live Los Angeles '74), a 3-LP set, for Record Store Day on 22 April 2017. The set was released in CD and digital formats in June 2017.

An official live album mostly recorded at the Michigan Palace, Detroit on 20 October 1974, during the last stage of the tour – known as The Soul Tour – was released for Record Store Day in August 2020. The 2-LP and 2-CD set is titled I'm Only Dancing (The Soul Tour 74). In September 2020, the album peaked at #16 on the Billboard Top Rock Albums chart, #12 on the Billboard Top Alternative Albums chart and #18 on the OCC (UK) Official Albums Chart .

== Band ==
June–July:

- David Bowie – vocals
- Michael Kamen – electric piano, Moog synthesizer, oboe, music director
- Earl Slick – guitar
- Mike Garson – piano, mellotron
- David Sanborn – alto saxophone, flute
- Richard Grando – baritone saxophone, flute
- Herbie Flowers – bass
- Tony Newman – drums
- Pablo Rosario – percussion
- Gui Andrisano – backing vocals
- Warren Peace – backing vocals

September:

- David Bowie – vocals
- Mike Garson – piano, mellotron
- Earl Slick – guitar
- Carlos Alomar – rhythm guitar
- David Sanborn – alto saxophone, flute
- Richard Grando – baritone saxophone, flute
- Doug Rauch – bass
- Greg Errico – drums
- Pablo Rosario – percussion
- Gui Andrisano – backing vocals
- Warren Peace – backing vocals
- Ava Cherry – backing vocals
- Robin Clark – backing vocals
- Anthony Hinton – backing vocals
- Diane Sumler – backing vocals
- Luther Vandross – backing vocals

"The Soul/Philly Dogs Tour" – October–December:

- David Bowie – vocals
- Mike Garson – piano, mellotron, music director
- Earl Slick – lead guitar
- Carlos Alomar – rhythm guitar
- David Sanborn – alto saxophone, flute
- Emir Ksasan – bass
- Dennis Davis – drums
- Pablo Rosario – percussion
- Warren Peace – backing vocals
- Ava Cherry – backing vocals
- Robin Clark – backing vocals
- Anthony Hinton – backing vocals
- Diane Sumler – backing vocals
- Luther Vandross – backing vocals

== Tour dates ==
- Two concerts were performed on 16 June in Toronto.

Date	City	Country	Venue
North America (First Leg)
14 June 1974	Montreal	Canada	Montreal Forum
15 June 1974	Ottawa	Canada	Ottawa Civic Centre
16 June 1974	Toronto	Canada	O'Keefe Centre
17 June 1974	Rochester	United States	Rochester Community War Memorial
18 June 1974	Cleveland	United States	Public Auditorium
19 June 1974	Cleveland	United States	Public Auditorium
20 June 1974	Toledo	United States	Toledo Sports Arena
22 June 1974	Detroit	United States	Cobo Hall
23 June 1974	Detroit	United States	Cobo Hall
24 June 1974	Trotwood	United States	Hara Arena
25 June 1974	Cincinnati	United States	Cincinnati Gardens
26 June 1974	Pittsburgh	United States	Syria Mosque
27 June 1974	Pittsburgh	United States	Syria Mosque
28 June 1974	Charleston	United States	Charleston Civic Center
29 June 1974	Nashville	United States	Nashville Municipal Auditorium
30 June 1974	Memphis	United States	Mid-South Coliseum
1 July 1974	Atlanta	United States	Fox Theatre
2 July 1974	Tampa	United States	Curtis Hixon Hall
3 July 1974	Casselberry	United States	Jai Alai
5 July 1974	Charlotte	United States	Charlotte Coliseum
6 July 1974	Greensboro	United States	Greensboro Coliseum
7 July 1974	Norfolk	United States	Norfolk Scope
8 July 1974	Upper Darby Township	United States	Tower Theater
9 July 1974	Upper Darby Township	United States	Tower Theater
10 July 1974	Upper Darby Township	United States	Tower Theater
11 July 1974	Upper Darby Township	United States	Tower Theater
12 July 1974	Upper Darby Township	United States	Tower Theater
13 July 1974	Upper Darby Township	United States	Tower Theater
14 July 1974	New Haven	United States	New Haven Coliseum
16 July 1974	Boston	United States	Music Hall
19 July 1974	New York City	United States	Madison Square Garden
20 July 1974	New York City	United States	Madison Square Garden
North America (Second Leg)
2 September 1974	Los Angeles	United States	Universal Amphitheatre
3 September 1974	Los Angeles	United States	Universal Amphitheatre
4 September 1974	Los Angeles	United States	Universal Amphitheatre
5 September 1974	Los Angeles	United States	Universal Amphitheatre
6 September 1974	Los Angeles	United States	Universal Amphitheatre
7 September 1974	Los Angeles	United States	Universal Amphitheatre
8 September 1974	Los Angeles	United States	Universal Amphitheatre
11 September 1974	San Diego	United States	San Diego Sports Arena
13 September 1974	Tucson	United States	Tucson Convention Center
14 September 1974	Phoenix	United States	Arizona Veterans Memorial Coliseum
15 September 1974	Anaheim	United States	Anaheim Convention Center
16 September 1974	Anaheim	United States	Anaheim Convention Center
North America (Third Leg)
5 October 1974	Saint Paul	United States	Saint Paul Civic Center
8 October 1974	Indianapolis	United States	Indiana Convention Center
10 October 1974	Madison	United States	Dane County Coliseum
11 October 1974	Madison	United States	Dane County Coliseum
13 October 1974	Milwaukee	United States	MECCA Arena
15 October 1974	Detroit	United States	Michigan Palace Theater
16 October 1974	Detroit	United States	Michigan Palace Theater
17 October 1974	Detroit	United States	Michigan Palace Theater
18 October 1974	Detroit	United States	Michigan Palace Theater
19 October 1974	Detroit	United States	Michigan Palace Theater
20 October 1974	Detroit	United States	Michigan Palace Theater
21 October 1974	Chicago	United States	Arie Crown Theater
22 October 1974	Chicago	United States	Arie Crown Theater
23 October 1974	Chicago	United States	Arie Crown Theater
28 October 1974	New York City	United States	Radio City Music Hall
29 October 1974	New York City	United States	Radio City Music Hall
30 October 1974	New York City	United States	Radio City Music Hall
31 October 1974	New York City	United States	Radio City Music Hall
1 November 1974	New York City	United States	Radio City Music Hall
2 November 1974	New York City	United States	Radio City Music Hall
3 November 1974	New York City	United States	Radio City Music Hall
6 November 1974	Cleveland	United States	Public Auditorium
8 November 1974	Buffalo	United States	War Memorial Stadium
11 November 1974	Landover	United States	Capital Centre
14 November 1974	Boston	United States	Music Hall
15 November 1974	Boston	United States	Music Hall
16 November 1974	Boston	United States	Music Hall
18 November 1974	Philadelphia	United States	The Spectrum Theater
19 November 1974	Pittsburgh	United States	Civic Arena
24 November 1974	Philadelphia	United States	The Spectrum Theater
25 November 1974	Philadelphia	United States	The Spectrum Theater
28 November 1974	Memphis	United States	Mid-South Coliseum
30 November 1974	Nashville	United States	Nashville Municipal Auditorium
1 December 1974	Atlanta	United States	Omni Coliseum

Cancellations

17 July 1974	Yarmouth, Massachusetts	Cape Cod Coliseum	Cancelled
6 October 1974	Saint Paul, Minnesota	Saint Paul Civic Center	Cancelled

== Songs ==
From David Bowie

- "Space Oddity"
- "Memory of a Free Festival"

From The Man Who Sold the World

- "The Width of a Circle"

From Hunky Dory

- "Changes"

From The Rise and Fall of Ziggy Stardust and the Spiders from Mars

- "Moonage Daydream"
- "Suffragette City"
- "Rock 'n' Roll Suicide"

From Aladdin Sane

- "Watch That Man"
- "Aladdin Sane (1913–1938-197?)"
- "Drive-In Saturday"
- "Panic in Detroit"
- "Cracked Actor"
- "Time"
- "The Jean Genie"

From Pin Ups

- "Sorrow" (originally by The McCoys in 1965 and made famous by The Merseys the following year; written by Bob Feldman, Jerry Goldstein and Richard Gottehrer)

From Diamond Dogs

- "Future Legend"
- "Diamond Dogs"
- "Sweet Thing"
- "Candidate"
- "Sweet Thing (Reprise)"
- "Rebel Rebel"
- "Rock 'n' Roll With Me"
- "1984"
- "Big Brother"
- "Chant of the Ever Circling Skeletal Family"

From Young Americans

- "Young Americans"
- "Win"
- "Somebody Up There Likes Me"
- "Can You Hear Me?"

Other songs

- "All the Young Dudes" (from All the Young Dudes (1972) by Mott the Hoople; written by Bowie)
- "Footstompin'" (from "Foot Stomping” by The Flares (1961), written by Aaron Collins)
- "Here Today, Gone Tomorrow" (from Observations in Time (1969) by the Ohio Players, written by Leroy Bonner, Joe Harris, Marshall "Rock" Jones, Ralph "Pee Wee" Middlebrooks, Dutch Robinson, Clarence "Satch" Satchell and Gary Webster)
- "It's Gonna Be Me" (outtake from Young Americans; released as a bonus track from the album's 1991 and 2007 reissues (the latter being an alternate version with strings))
- "John, I'm Only Dancing (Again)" (a rearranged version of a non-album Bowie single first released in 1972/1973, a studio version of which was itself later released as a single in 1979)
- "Knock on Wood" (originally from Knock on Wood (1966) by Eddie Floyd; written by Floyd and Steve Cropper; later released as a single from David Live (1974))
