= Watch That Man =

Song by David Bowie

from the album Aladdin Sane
- Released: 19 April 1973 (Note: There is some debate about the release date. Previously reported as 13 April 1973, in 2018, Bowie's official website stated that new evidence had come to light proving that the official release date was 20 April 1973, but because this was Good Friday (a public holiday in the UK), the album was made available on 19 April. According to Benoît Clerc's book David Bowie All the Songs (2022), the US release date was 13 April and the UK release date was 19 April.)
- Recorded: January 1973
- Studio: Trident, London
- Genre: Glam rock; garage rock; hard rock
- Length: 4:25
- Label: RCA
- Songwriter: David Bowie
- Producers: Ken Scott, David Bowie

"Watch That Man" is a song by the English musician David Bowie, the opening track on the album Aladdin Sane from 1973. Its style is often compared to the Rolling Stones' Exile on Main Street. The mix, in which Bowie's lead vocal is buried within the instrumental sections, has generated discussion among critics and fans.

== Recording ==
With the release of his album The Rise and Fall of Ziggy Stardust and the Spiders from Mars and his performance of "Starman" on the BBC television programme Top of the Pops in early July 1972, David Bowie was launched to stardom. To support the album, Bowie embarked on the Ziggy Stardust Tour in both the UK and the US. He composed most of the tracks for the follow-up record on the road during the US tour in late 1972. Because of this, many of the tracks were influenced by America, and his perceptions of the country.

"Watch That Man" was written in response to seeing two concerts by the American rock band New York Dolls. According to author Peter Doggett, the Dolls' first two albums were important in representing the American response to the British glam rock movement. Bowie was impressed with their sound and wanted to emulate it on a song. "Watch That Man" was recorded at London's Trident Studios in January 1973, following the conclusion of the American tour and a series of Christmas concerts in England and Scotland. Like the rest of its parent album, the song was co-produced by Bowie and Ken Scott and featured Bowie's backing band the Spiders from Mars – comprising guitarist Mick Ronson, bassist Trevor Bolder and drummer Woody Woodmansey.

== Production ==
NME editors Roy Carr and Charles Shaar Murray considered "Watch That Man" the prime example of a collection of songs on Aladdin Sane that were "written too fast, recorded too fast and mixed too fast". They remarked on the "hurried shoddiness" of its production which "doesn't even sound like a finished mix". Co-producer Ken Scott however, speaking in 1999, defended the mix as the result of careful deliberation. The label and Bowie's publisher MainMan initially requested a new mix with Bowie's vocal more upfront, but after Bowie and Scott complied, it was deemed inferior to the original.

'Watch That Man' was very much a Stones-sounding thing, with the vocal used as an instrument rather than as a lead. When it came to mixing the track, to get the sort of power of it, I just put everything up front, which meant losing the vocal. So I did the mix the way I felt. When we delivered the tapes of the album, I heard from MainMan, 'Great, but can we get another mix on "Watch That Man" with the vocal more up front so we can hear a bit more of David?' So I said, 'Fine,' and did the mix with David more up front. The problem though is that with the vocal more up front, the other instruments have to drop back. Then, a couple of weeks later, I get a phone call from RCA, and they said 'You were right in the first place. We'll go with the original.'

== Music and lyrics ==
According to author Nicholas Pegg, "Watch That Man" could be taken as "one of Bowie's most calculated changes of direction", to a more Stones-inspired dirty rock sound. Bowie himself suggested in the year of its release that it was a reminiscence of his introduction to the drug-fuelled American tour experience of late 1972. Rolling Stone magazine called it "inimitable Stones, Exile vintage. Mick Ronson plays Chuck Berry licks via Keith Richards, Garson plays at being Nicky Hopkins, Bowie slurs his lines, and the female backup singers and horns make the appropriate noises."

== Live versions ==
- It was the third track on the live album Ziggy Stardust: The Motion Picture from the farewell concert at the Hammersmith Odeon, London, on 3 July 1973.
- A live version from the 1974 tour was released on David Live. This version was also released on the Sound + Vision box set and on the album Rock Concert.

== Other releases ==
- It was the B-side of the Italian release of the single "Let's Spend the Night Together" in June 1973.
- It appeared on the Japanese compilation The Best of David Bowie in 1974.

== Cover versions ==
- Lulu recorded the song in July 1973, releasing it as the B-side of the single "The Man Who Sold the World", another Bowie track, on 11 January 1974. The band included Bowie on guitar, sax and backing vocals, Mick Ronson on guitar, Trevor Bolder on bass, Mike Garson on piano, and Aynsley Dunbar on drums. Produced by Bowie and Ronson, it has been described as having "a mix and backing vocal performance that easily outstrips the original". Lulu's cover of "Watch That Man" was also released on the albums From Crayons to Perfume, Heaven and Earth and the Stars and David Bowie Songbook (various artists).

== Personnel ==
According to Chris O'Leary:

- David Bowie – lead vocal
- Mick Ronson – lead and rhythm guitar
- Trevor Bolder – bass
- Mick "Woody" Woodmansey – drums
- Mike Garson – piano
- Ken Fordham – saxophone
- Linda Lewis – backing vocals
- G.A. MacCormack – backing vocals
- Juanita "Honey" Franklin – backing vocals

Production

- David Bowie – producer
- Ken Scott – producer, engineer
