= Sound + Vision (box set) =

1989 album by David Bowie

Box set by David Bowie
- Released: 19 September 1989 (original); 2 December 2003 (reissue)
- Recorded: 1969–1980 (original); 1969–1997 (reissue)
- Genres: Rock; glam rock; art rock
- Length: 196:38 (original); 298:03 (reissue)
- Labels: Rykodisc; EMI; Virgin
- Producers: David Bowie; Ken Scott; Tony Visconti; Harry Maslin (original and reissue); Giorgio Moroder; Nile Rodgers; Derek Bramble; Hugh Padgham; David Richards; Tin Machine; Tim Palmer (reissue)

David Bowie chronology
Never Let Me Down (1987)	Sound + Vision (1989)	Changesbowie (1990)

Alternative cover
- 2003 edition

Professional ratings
Review scores
Source	Rating
AllMusic	3/5 stars
Rolling Stone	4/5 stars
The Rolling Stone Album Guide	4/5 stars

Sound + Vision is the first box set by English musician David Bowie, released by Rykodisc in 1989. By the end of the 1980s, the rights to Bowie's pre-1983 catalogue (originally issued by Phillips/Mercury Records and RCA Records) reverted to Bowie and his former management company, MainMan. Rykodisc had approached Bowie in 1988 to re-release his albums on CD and Bowie agreed, and in September 1989 the Sound + Vision box set was released. By April 1990, the box set had sold over 200,000 copies, which, for a set costing $50–$60 (or about $140 today), was considered "phenomenal".

== Set contents ==
Sound + Vision was originally conceived in January 1988 as a career retrospective, modeled on Bob Dylan's Biograph and Eric Clapton's Crossroads, that launched the then-upcoming Rykodisc CD reissue campaign covering Bowie's output from 1969 to 1980. Primarily based on the Serious Moonlight Tour setlist, it contains few of Bowie's greatest hits in their original form, instead frequently opting for demos, live versions and even a German vocal version of ""Heroes"" ("Helden"). The "rarities" originally included on the 1989 edition of Sound + Vision—rare single versions of "Wild Eyed Boy from Freecloud" and "Rebel Rebel", and previously unreleased studio outtakes "London Bye Ta-Ta", "1984/Dodo", "After Today" and "It's Hard to Be a Saint in the City"—were exclusive to this box set.

== Awards and reception ==
The set won the 1990 Grammy Award for Best Album Package. Rolling Stone said the boxset "stood above the rest [of the 1989 boxset releases]" and called the release a "promising harbinger" for the then-upcoming re-release of Bowie's RCA back catalogue on CD by Rykodisc, for which Bowie launched a worldwide supporting tour.

== Release versions ==
It exists in two primary editions, each of which has been released in an original version and a subsequent repackaged version:

1. The original 1989 Rykodisc edition, in an LP-size box designed by Roger Gorman and featuring photography by Greg Gorman, was either in LP, audiocassette or CD format, as six LPs, three cassettes or three CDs and one CD-Video (a Laserdisc type disc that was retired in 1991), with the latter containing three audio live tracks and the music video of "Ashes to Ashes". There was also a numbered limited edition of 350 in a solid beech wood case with a certificate personally signed by Bowie. Content from this release included material from Bowie's catalogue through 1980 (including several live performances from the 1970s). A second Rykodisc version of this edition, released in 1994 on CD, replaced the CD-Video with a regular CD-ROM, and a further reissue in 1995 omitted the video disc entirely and was packaged in a smaller slipcase. The contents of these releases are otherwise identical to the original release.
2. A new edition of the album, issued by Virgin/EMI in 2003, added Bowie studio material released from 1982–1993 (plus live tracks from 1983 and 1997), and replaced some of the tracks from the original set with alternate versions. This version contains more tracks on each CD than the original release, and does not include the CD-Video/CD-ROM tracks from the original release. This edition was re-released on CD, in a smaller slipcase, in 2014.

== Track listing ==
=== 1989 issue ===
All tracks are written by David Bowie unless where noted.

Disc one
No.	Title	Writer(s)	Place of origin	Length
1.	"Space Oddity" (Demo version)		Previously unreleased; demo recorded in spring 1969	5:09
2.	"Wild Eyed Boy from Freecloud" (Single version)		B-side to the "Space Oddity" single, 1969	4:50
3.	"The Prettiest Star" (Marc Bolan mono single version)		Non-album single, 1970; re-recorded and reissued on Aladdin Sane, 1973	3:11
4.	"London Bye Ta-Ta" (Mono version)		Previously unreleased; recorded in 1970 as follow up single to "Space Oddity"	2:35
5.	"Black Country Rock"		The Man Who Sold the World, 1970	3:33
6.	"The Man Who Sold the World"		The Man Who Sold the World	3:56
7.	"The Bewlay Brothers"		Hunky Dory, 1971	5:22
8.	"Changes"		Hunky Dory	3:35
9.	"Round and Round" (Cover of the Chuck Berry song "Around and Around")	Chuck Berry	B-side of the "Drive-In Saturday" single, 1973; recorded during the Ziggy Stardust sessions, 1971	2:41
10.	"Moonage Daydream"		The Rise and Fall of Ziggy Stardust and the Spiders from Mars, 1972	4:39
11.	"John, I'm Only Dancing" (Sax version)		Non-album single, 1973; originally released in 1972; Aladdin Sane outtake	2:43
12.	"Drive-In Saturday"		Aladdin Sane	4:30
13.	"Panic in Detroit"		Aladdin Sane	4:25
14.	"Ziggy Stardust" (Live)		Ziggy Stardust: The Motion Picture, recorded 1973, released 1983; originally from Ziggy Stardust	3:16
15.	"White Light/White Heat" (Live)	Lou Reed	Ziggy Stardust: The Motion Picture; originally by The Velvet Underground from the album of the same name, 1968	3:57
16.	"Rock 'n' Roll Suicide" (Live)		Ziggy Stardust: The Motion Picture	4:30

Disc two
No.	Title	Writer(s)	Place of origin	Length
1.	"Anyway, Anyhow, Anywhere"	Roger Daltrey, Pete Townshend	Pin Ups, 1973	3:08
2.	"Sorrow"	Bob Feldman, Jerry Goldstein, Richard Gottehrer	Pin Ups	2:53
3.	"Don't Bring Me Down"	Johnnie Dee	Pin Ups	2:05
4.	"1984/Dodo"		Previously unreleased; originally recorded for the U.S. TV special The 1980 Floor Show and later found on the Dollars in Drag bootleg, 1973	5:29
5.	"Big Brother"		Diamond Dogs, 1974	3:21
6.	"Rebel Rebel" (U.S. single version)		Diamond Dogs; released a few months before the album's release	3:01
7.	"Suffragette City" (Live)		David Live, 1974; originally from Ziggy Stardust	3:50
8.	"Watch That Man" (Live)		David Live; originally from Aladdin Sane	5:07
9.	"Cracked Actor" (Live)		David Live; originally from Aladdin Sane	3:30
10.	"Young Americans" (U.S. single version)		Young Americans, 1975	3:30
11.	"Fascination" (An alternate mix replaced by the album mix on the 2003 issue)	Bowie, Luther Vandross	Young Americans	5:45
12.	"After Today"		Previously unreleased; Young Americans outtake, 1975	3:50
13.	"It's Hard to Be a Saint in the City"	Bruce Springsteen	Previously unreleased; Station to Station outtake, 1975	3:49
14.	"TVC 15"		Station to Station, 1976	5:31
15.	"Wild Is the Wind"	Dimitri Tiomkin, Ned Washington	Station to Station; originally written for the film of the same name, 1957	5:58

Disc three
No.	Title	Writer(s)	Place of Origin	Length
1.	"Sound and Vision"		Low, 1977	3:05
2.	"Be My Wife"		Low	2:57
3.	"Speed of Life"		Low	2:47
4.	""Helden"" (German version of ""Heroes"", recorded in 1977 and remixed for this release)	Bowie, Brian Eno	"Heroes", 1977	3:39
5.	"Joe the Lion"		"Heroes"	3:07
6.	"Sons of the Silent Age"		"Heroes"	3:19
7.	"Station to Station" (Live)		Stage, 1978; originally from Station to Station	8:50
8.	"Warszawa" (Live)	Bowie, Eno	Stage; originally from Low	6:52
9.	"Breaking Glass" (Live)	Bowie, Dennis Davis, George Murray	Stage; originally from Low	3:35
10.	"Red Sails"	Bowie, Eno	Lodger, 1979	3:45
11.	"Look Back in Anger"	Bowie, Eno	Lodger	3:07
12.	"Boys Keep Swinging"	Bowie, Eno	Lodger	3:18
13.	"Up the Hill Backwards"		Scary Monsters (And Super Creeps), 1980	3:15
14.	"Kingdom Come"	Tom Verlaine	Scary Monsters (And Super Creeps)	3:44
15.	"Ashes to Ashes"		Scary Monsters (And Super Creeps)	4:23

CD-Video/CD-ROM
No.	Title	Place of origin	Length
1.	"John, I'm Only Dancing" (Live at the Boston Music Hall, Boston, Massachusetts, U.S., 1 October 1972)	Previously unreleased	2:40
2.	"Changes" (Live at the Boston Music Hall, Boston, Massachusetts, U.S., 1 October 1972)	Previously unreleased	3:20
3.	"The Supermen" (Live at the Boston Music Hall, Boston, Massachusetts, U.S., 1 October 1972)	Previously unreleased; originally from The Man Who Sold the World	2:43
4.	"Ashes to Ashes" (Video/Single edit)		3:34

=== 2003 reissue (CD: EMI / 5945112) ===
All songs written by David Bowie except where noted. Songs that are different from the original Sound + Vision box set or new to this release of the box set are as indicated with *.

Disc one
No.	Title	Writer(s)	Length
1.	"Space Oddity" (Demo version)		5:09
2.	"Wild Eyed Boy from Freecloud*" (With spoken intro)		4:57
3.	"The Prettiest Star" (Marc Bolan mono single version)		3:11
4.	"London Bye Ta-Ta*" (Previously unreleased stereo mix)		2:37
5.	"Black Country Rock"		3:35
6.	"The Man Who Sold the World"		3:58
7.	"The Bewlay Brothers"		5:23
8.	"Changes"		3:34
9.	"Round and Round*" (Alternate vocal)		2:43
10.	"Moonage Daydream"		4:40
11.	"John, I'm Only Dancing" (Sax version)		2:44
12.	"Drive-In Saturday"		4:31
13.	"Panic in Detroit"		4:27
14.	"Ziggy Stardust" (Live)		3:23
15.	"White Light/White Heat" (Live)	Reed	4:23
16.	"Rock 'n' Roll Suicide" (Live)		4:16
17.	"Anyway, Anyhow, Anywhere"	Daltrey, Townshend	3:07
18.	"Sorrow"	Feldman, Goldstein, Gottehrer	2:53
19.	"Don't Bring Me Down"	Dee	2:06

Disc two
No.	Title	Writer(s)	Length
1.	"1984/Dodo"		5:29
2.	"Big Brother"		3:23
3.	"Rebel Rebel" (U.S. single version)		3:00
4.	"Suffragette City" (Live)		3:46
5.	"Watch That Man" (Live)		5:08
6.	"Cracked Actor" (Live)		3:31
7.	"Young Americans"		5:13
8.	"Fascination*"	Bowie, Vandross	5:46
9.	"After Today*"		3:49
10.	"It's Hard to Be a Saint in the City"	Springsteen	3:48
11.	"TVC 15"		5:32
12.	"Wild Is the Wind"	Tiomkin, Washington	6:00
13.	"Sound and Vision"		3:04
14.	"Be My Wife"		2:56
15.	"Speed of Life"		2:46
16.	""Helden"" (German version of ""Heroes"")		3:39
17.	"Joe the Lion"	Bowie, Eno	3:07
18.	"Sons of the Silent Age"		3:18

Disc three
No.	Title	Writer(s)	Place of origin	Length
1.	"Station to Station" (Live)			8:53
2.	"Warszawa" (Live)	Bowie, Eno		6:49
3.	"Breaking Glass" (Live)	Bowie, Davis, Murray		3:30
4.	"Red Sails"	Bowie, Eno		3:44
5.	"Look Back in Anger"	Bowie, Eno		3:07
6.	"Boys Keep Swinging"	Bowie, Eno		3:18
7.	"Up the Hill Backwards"			3:15
8.	"Kingdom Come"	Verlaine		3:45
9.	"Ashes to Ashes"			4:24
10.	"Baal's Hymn*"	Bertolt Brecht, Dominic Muldowney	Baal (EP), 1982; previously unreleased on CD	4:02
11.	"The Drowned Girl*"	Brecht, Kurt Weill	Baal; previously unreleased on CD	2:26
12.	"Cat People (Putting Out Fire)*" (with Giorgio Moroder)	Bowie, Giorgio Moroder	Cat People soundtrack, 1982	6:45
13.	"China Girl*"	Bowie, Iggy Pop	Let's Dance, 1983; originally by Iggy Pop from The Idiot, 1977	5:32
14.	"Ricochet*"		Let's Dance	5:12
15.	"Modern Love*" (Live)		"Modern Love" B-side, 1983; originally from Let's Dance; previously unreleased on CD	3:45
16.	"Loving the Alien*"		Tonight, 1984	7:07
17.	"Dancing with the Big Boys*" (with Iggy Pop)	Bowie, Pop, Carlos Alomar	Tonight	3:34

Disc four
No.	Title	Writer(s)	Place of origin	Length
1.	"Blue Jean*"		Tonight	3:12
2.	"Time Will Crawl*"		Never Let Me Down, 1987	4:19
3.	"Baby Can Dance*" (as Tin Machine)		Tin Machine, 1989	4:58
4.	"Amazing*" (as Tin Machine)	Bowie, Reeves Gabrels	Tin Machine	3:04
5.	"I Can't Read*" (as Tin Machine)	Bowie, Gabrels	Tin Machine	4:57
6.	"Shopping for Girls*" (as Tin Machine)	Bowie, Gabrels	Tin Machine II, 1991	3:45
7.	"Goodbye Mr. Ed*" (as Tin Machine)	Bowie, Tony Sales, Hunt Sales	Tin Machine II	3:24
8.	"Amlapura*" (as Tin Machine)	Bowie, Gabrels	Tin Machine II	3:49
9.	"You've Been Around*"	Bowie, Gabrels	Black Tie White Noise, 1993	4:44
10.	"Nite Flights*" (Moodswings Back to Basics remix radio edit)	N. Scott Engel	Previously unreleased; original version from Black Tie White Noise	4:37
11.	"Pallas Athena" (Gone Midnight mix)		Previously unreleased on CD, original version from Black Tie White Noise	4:21
12.	"Jump They Say*"		Black Tie White Noise	4:25
13.	"The Buddha of Suburbia*"		The Buddha of Suburbia soundtrack, 1993	4:27
14.	"Dead Against It*"		The Buddha of Suburbia	5:48
15.	"South Horizon*"		The Buddha of Suburbia	5:25
16.	"Pallas Athena*" (Live as Tao Jones Index)		B-side of the "Seven Years in Tibet" single, 1998	8:19

== Charts ==
Album

Year	Chart	Position
1989	US Billboard 200	97
2014	Belgian Albums (Ultratop Flanders)	89
2014	Irish Albums (IRMA)	90
2014	UK Albums (Official Charts)	63
2016	Australian Albums Chart	72
2016	Belgian Albums (Ultratop Wallonia)	96
2016	Hungarian Albums (MAHASZ)	26
2016	New Zealand Albums (RMNZ)	9

== Certifications ==
Organization	Level	Date
RIAA – US	Gold	7 November 1995
