= Around and Around =

1958 song by Chuck Berry

Single by Chuck Berry
- A-side: "Johnny B. Goode"
- Released: March 31, 1958
- Studio: Chess (Chicago)
- Genre: Rock and roll; blues
- Length: 2:20
- Label: Chess 1691
- Songwriter: Chuck Berry

"Around and Around" is a 1958 rock song written and first recorded by Chuck Berry. It originally appeared under the name "Around & Around" as the B-side to the single "Johnny B. Goode".

== The Rolling Stones version ==
"Around and Around"

Song by The Rolling Stones

from the album 12 X 5
- Released: 14 August 1964
- Recorded: 11 June 1964
- Studio: Chess Studios (Chicago)
- Genre: Rock
- Length: 3:05
- Songwriter: Chuck Berry
- Producer: Andrew Loog Oldham

The Rolling Stones recorded “Around and Around” for their 1964 EP Five by Five; the EP tracks were later included on their second U.S. album 12 × 5. On 12 × 5, the track appears with a listed duration of 3:03.

=== Background and recording ===
The EP was recorded at Chess Studios in Chicago during the band’s 1964 U.S. tour. In a retrospective on the EP, uDiscoverMusic notes that the Chess engineer was Ron Malo and that producer Andrew Loog Oldham wrote in his liner notes that the EP was recorded in Chicago during the tour and included an extra track as a “thank you” to fans. The same article reports that Chuck Berry visited the studio while the band were recording “Around and Around”. The EP has been described as a mix of originals and blues and R&B covers.

=== Personnel ===
Credits adapted from available published sources.

- Mick Jagger – vocals
- Keith Richards – guitar
- Brian Jones – guitar
- Bill Wyman – bass
- Charlie Watts – drums
- Ian Stewart – piano

=== Live performances ===
The Rolling Stones performed the song on their first appearance on The Ed Sullivan Show on October 25, 1964. The group also performed “Around and Around” in the concert film The T.A.M.I. Show (1964).

In 1977, the song appeared on the live album Love You Live.

In 2012, “Around and Around” was performed at the Prudential Center in Newark and was later released as a bonus track on GRRR Live!.

=== Chart performance ===
In Sweden, the song was considered as the lead track from the Five by Five EP and as such reached the charts, peaking at number three on Tio i Topp and number five on Kvällstoppen.

=== David Bowie ===
English musician David Bowie recorded the song in 1971, produced by Ken Scott, under the title "Round and Round". Originally slated for inclusion on his 1972 album The Rise and Fall of Ziggy Stardust and the Spiders from Mars, it was ousted by "Starman" at the last minute. Regarding the song, Bowie stated in 1972: "It would have been the kind of number that Ziggy would have done onstage ... He jammed it for old times' sake in the studio, and our enthusiasm for it probably waned after we heard it a few times. We replaced it with a thing called 'Starman'. I don't think it's any great loss, really." "Round and Round" was released as the B-side of the single "Drive-In Saturday" in April 1973. The original single mix was included on the compilations Rare (1982) and Re:Call 1, part of the Five Years (1969–1973) compilation (2015). Alternate mixes were included on Bowie's Sound + Vision box sets (1989, 2003) and on the bonus disc of the Ziggy Stardust - 30th Anniversary Reissue (2002). Bowie also performed it live on 3 July 1973 at the final concert of the Ziggy Stardust Tour, featuring Jeff Beck on guitar. The song was included in the D. A. Pennebaker-directed film of the concert or the accompanying soundtrack album on its 50th anniversary Edition in August 2023 and features Jeff Beck on guitar.

=== Other artists ===
The Swinging Blue Jeans included a version on their 1964 album Blue Jeans a'Swinging, on their label His Master's Voice 1802.

The Animals covered it on both their US debut album, The Animals, MGM Records – SE 4264, and their UK debut album also called The Animals, Columbia (EMI) 33SX 1669, in 1964. Eric Burdon had also included it in some of his live sets. The Animals performed the song in the MGM film Get Yourself a College Girl (1964).

U.S. rock band Pearl Jam released an in-studio version as the B-side of its 2016 Christmas single.

The song was a staple of the Grateful Dead, who played it in concert over 400 times between 1970 and 1995. It appears on 19 Grateful Dead albums, and nine more by related acts from the Grateful Dead family.

Meat Loaf placed the song in his "Rock 'n Roll Medley" during his 1989 tour for a short time.

38 Special covered the song on their 1977 self-titled debut album.

Maureen Tucker of the Velvet Underground also recorded the song for her 1981 debut solo album, Playin' Possum. It was released as a single as a double a-side with "Will You Love Me Tomorrow?".

American punk rock band Germs released their version of the song which is included on the posthumous What We Do Is Secret EP released in 1981, as well as (MIA): The Complete Anthology released in 1993. Although originally a Chuck Berry song, their version is much closer to Bowie's version. Lead singer, Darby Crash was heavily influenced by Bowie, as well as other members of the band.

Dayton, Ohio based indie rock band Guided By Voices has regularly included the song in their live sets since their 1996 Mag Earwig tour.

It was also covered by Waysted in their 1985 album The Good The Bad and The Waysted. The song is a staple of their live set since.

The song was also a staple at Argentine band Los Piojos's live shows, and a medley featuring "Around & Around" and "Blue Suede Shoes" (renamed in Spanish as Zapatos de Gamuza Azul) was released on their 1999 live album Ritual.
