= Time (David Bowie song) =

1973 single by David Bowie

Single by David Bowie

from the album Aladdin Sane
- B-side: "The Prettiest Star"
- Released: 13 April 1973 (US)
- Recorded: January 1973
- Studio: Trident, London
- Genre: Glam rock
- Length: 3:38 (7" single edit); 5:31 (album version)
- Label: RCA
- Songwriter: David Bowie
- Producers: Ken Scott; David Bowie

David Bowie singles chronology
"Drive-In Saturday" (1973)	"Time" (1973)	"Let's Spend the Night Together" (1973)

Official audio
- "Time" (2013 Remaster) on YouTube

"Time" is a song by the English singer-songwriter David Bowie. Written in New Orleans in November 1972 during the American leg of the Ziggy Stardust Tour, it was recorded in London in January 1973 and released as the opening track on side two of the album Aladdin Sane that April. An edited version of the song supplanted the release of the single "Drive-In Saturday" in the United States, Canada and Japan. It was also released in France and South Africa, while early Spanish copies of David Live included a free copy of the single.

== Production and style ==
The piece has been described as "burlesque vamp", and compared to the cabaret music of Jacques Brel and Bertolt Brecht/Kurt Weill. Keyboardist Mike Garson said that he employed "the old stride piano style from the 20s and I mixed it up with avant-garde jazz styles plus it had the element of show music, plus it was very European." Co-producer Ken Scott took credit for the idea of mixing the sound of Bowie's breathing right up front when the music paused, just before guitarist Mick Ronson launched into his cacophonous solo.

The song's best-known couplet is "Time – he flexes like a whore / Falls wanking to the floor"; RCA allowed it to remain in the US single edit, being unfamiliar with the British term "wanking". However, when Bowie came to perform the song on the U.S. television special The 1980 Floor Show in October 1973, he slurred the line in such a way as to render it "Falls swanking to the floor." Conversely, RCA cut the line "In quaaludes and red wine" from the single, while Bowie retained it for The 1980 Floor Show. The phrase "Billy Dolls" refers to Billy Murcia, late drummer for the New York Dolls.

Artist Tanja Stark suggests the infamous lyric may be a cryptic allusion to ‘Chronos’, the ancient Greek personification of 'Time' who was associated with 'magical semen', due to Bowie's well known fascination with mythology and esoterica.

Bowie said of the song: "I’ve written a new song on the new album which is just called ‘Time’, and I thought it was about time, and I wrote very heavily about time, and the way I felt about time – at times – and I played it back after we recorded it and my God, it was a gay song! And I’d no intention of writing anything at all gay. When I’d listened to it back I just could not believe it. I thought well, that’s the strangest ..."

== Reception ==
Like its parent album, "Time" has divided critical opinion. Biographer David Buckley calls the full-length version "five minutes of wired perfection" and the lyrics "poetic and succinct", while NME critics Roy Carr and Charles Shaar Murray have described the words as sounding "strained and incomplete", concluding that "with such a weak lyric, the overly melodramatic music sounds faintly absurd". Record World predicted that it "should be a monster in no time at all".

Mojo magazine listed it as Bowie's 99th best track in 2015.

== Track listing ==
All tracks written by David Bowie.

1. "Time" – 3:38
2. "The Prettiest Star" – 3:27

The Japanese release featured "Panic in Detroit" on the B-side.

== Personnel ==
According to Chris O'Leary: (Note: O'Leary is unsure whether Bowie or Ken Fordham played tenor saxophone.)

- David Bowie – lead and backing vocals, 12-string acoustic guitar, production
- Mick Ronson – lead and rhythm guitars, backing vocals
- Trevor Bolder – bass
- Mick Woodmansey – drums
- Mike Garson – piano
- Brian "Bux" Wilshaw – flute
- Ken Scott – production

== Live versions ==
- It was recorded at the farewell concert at the Hammersmith Odeon, London, on 3 July 1973, later released on Ziggy Stardust: The Motion Picture.
- The live version recorded for The 1980 Floor Show on 20 October 1973 was released on the semi-legal album Rarestonebowie in 1994.
- A live version from the first leg of the Diamond Dogs Tour was released as a bonus track on the Rykodisc release of David Live in 1990. The 2005 reissue of David Live inserted "Time" into its correct position in the concert track listing.
- A live recording from the second leg of the same tour was released in 2017 on Cracked Actor (Live Los Angeles '74).
- The song was performed live during the Glass Spider Tour, released on the Glass Spider (1988) concert video, and appeared again on the 2007 Special Edition (recorded at the Montreal Olympic Stadium on 30 August 1987).

== Other releases ==
- It appeared on the Japanese compilation The Best of David Bowie.
- The single edit of the song was released on the bonus disc of the Aladdin Sane – 30th Anniversary Edition, in 2003, and on Re:Call 1, part of the Five Years (1969–1973) boxed set, in 2015.

== Cover versions ==
- Cinema Strange – Goth Oddity – A Tribute to David Bowie (1999)
- David J's Cabaret Obscura – .2 Contamination: A Tribute to David Bowie (2006)
- Momus – Turpsycore (2015)
- Rozz Williams – Live recording
- J. G. Thirlwell sampled the lines 'Wanking' and 'Falls wanking to the floor' for 'Self Destruction, Final', his remix of Nine Inch Nails' 'Mr. Self Destruct', which appears in Further Down the Spiral (1995)
