= Drive-In Saturday =

1973 song by David Bowie

Single by David Bowie

from the album Aladdin Sane
- B-side: "Round and Round"
- Released: 6 April 1973
- Recorded: 9 December 1972
- Studio: RCA, New York City
- Genre: Glam rock; doo-wop
- Length: 4:29
- Label: RCA
- Songwriter: David Bowie
- Producers: Ken Scott; David Bowie

David Bowie singles chronology
"The Jean Genie" (1972)	"Drive-In Saturday" (1973)	"Time" (1973)

Official audio
- "Drive-In Saturday" (2013 Remaster) on YouTube

"Drive-In Saturday" is a song by the English musician David Bowie from his 1973 album Aladdin Sane. It was released as a single a week before the album and, like its predecessor "The Jean Genie", became a Top 3 UK hit.

== Music and lyrics ==
Heavily influenced by 1950s doo-wop, "Drive-In Saturday" describes how the inhabitants of a post-apocalyptic world in the future (Bowie once said the year was 2033) have forgotten how to have sex, and need to watch old films to see how it is done. The narrative has been cited as an example of Bowie's "futuristic nostalgia", where the story is told from the perspective of an inhabitant of the future looking back in time.

Its composition was inspired by strange lights amidst the barren landscape between Seattle, Washington, and Phoenix, Arizona, as seen from a train at night on Bowie's 1972 US tour. The music featured Bowie's synthesiser and saxophone, while the lyrics name-checked Mick Jagger ("When people stared in Jagger's eyes and scored"), the model Twiggy ("She'd sigh like Twig the wonder kid"), and Carl Jung ("Jung the foreman prayed at work"). The reference to Jung is significant according to artist Tanja Stark, and heralds the pivotal influence of Jungian depth psychology frameworks upon his career. She suggests the lyric "crashing out with sylvian" is a cryptic reference to the Sylvian fissure in the brain associated with visionary and hallucinatory experiences.

== Recording and release ==
Bowie premiered the song live in November 1972—initially at either Pirate's World, Fort Lauderdale, Florida, or Celebrity Theatre, Phoenix—well before committing it to tape. He offered it to Mott the Hoople as a follow-up to the Bowie-penned "All the Young Dudes", but they turned it down in favour of "Honaloochie Boogie". Bowie later said that he was unsure why they rejected it because it "would've been a great single for them". However, according to Mott the Hoople's drummer Dale Griffin, Bowie initially said it would be their next single before he changed his mind, which Griffin said inspired them to write an original song instead.

Bowie's studio version, recorded in New York on 9 December 1972, was released as a single on 6 April 1973, one week ahead of the album, and remained in the charts for 10 weeks, reaching No. 3 in the UK. The B-side, "Round and Round", was a cover of Chuck Berry's track "Around and Around", a leftover from the Ziggy Stardust sessions. In most territories, the single was the same length as the album cut, aside from Germany, which received a shorter 3:59 edit. Bowie encyclopedist Nicholas Pegg describes "Drive-In Saturday" as "arguably the finest track on Aladdin Sane", as well as "the great forgotten Bowie single", which he attributed to the fact that it was not issued on a greatest hits album until almost 20 years after its release. Biographer David Buckley has called "Drive-In Saturday" and "Rebel Rebel" Bowie's "finest glam-era singles".

Some commentators have ranked the song among Bowie's finest. In The Guardian, Alexis Petridis voted it in number 10 in his list of Bowie's 50 greatest songs in 2020, calling it a one of Bowie's best singles. In other lists, the song has ranked at number 26, 24 and 79 in NME, Uncut and Mojo, respectively. In a 2016 list ranking every Bowie single from worst to best, Ultimate Classic Rock placed "Drive-In Saturday" at number 49.

=== Other releases ===
"Drive-In Saturday" has appeared on the compilation albums Sound + Vision (1989), The Singles Collection (1993), The Best of David Bowie 1969/1974 (1997), Best of Bowie (2002), The Platinum Collection (2006) and Nothing Has Changed (2014). On 20 April 2013, a 40th Anniversary 7" picture disc of "Drive-in Saturday" was released as an exclusive for the Record Store Day. "Drive-In Saturday" was backed up with the 1973 Russell Harty Plus live version of the track.

== Live versions ==
- A live audience recording from The Public Hall, Cleveland, Ohio, on 25 November 1972 was released on the bonus disc of the Aladdin Sane – 30th Anniversary Edition in 2003.
- Bowie performed the song on the UK television show Russell Harty Plus on 17 January 1973. This performance is included on the DVD version of Best of Bowie and as the B-side of the 2013 Record Store Day release.
- On the 1974 Diamond Dogs Tour, the song was performed in a stripped-down acoustic style. It was retired from live performances until it reappeared on the 1999 Hours Tour; a recording from the tour was included on VH1 Storytellers.

== Personnel ==
According to Chris O'Leary:

- David Bowie – lead and harmony vocal, 12-string acoustic guitar, tenor saxophone, ARP synthesiser, handclaps, finger clicks
- Mick Ronson – electric guitar, harmony vocal, handclaps
- Trevor Bolder – bass
- Mick Woodmansey – drums, tambourine
- Mike Garson – piano

Production

- David Bowie – producer
- Ken Scott – producer

== Charts ==
Chart (1973)	Peak position
Belgium (Ultratop 50 Wallonia)	47
Denmark (Årets Singlehitliste)	1
Ireland (IRMA)	14
Finnish (Suomen virallinen lista)	30
UK Singles (Official Charts)	3

== Covers and appearances ==
"Drive-In Saturday" was a favourite of the singer Morrissey. He performed it live numerous times and a live recording appears on the vinyl release of his 2008 single "All You Need Is Me". Def Leppard recorded a cover for their 2006 covers album Yeah!. Bowie's recording also appeared on the soundtrack of the 2007 film Control.
