= Angie Bowie =

American actress and journalist

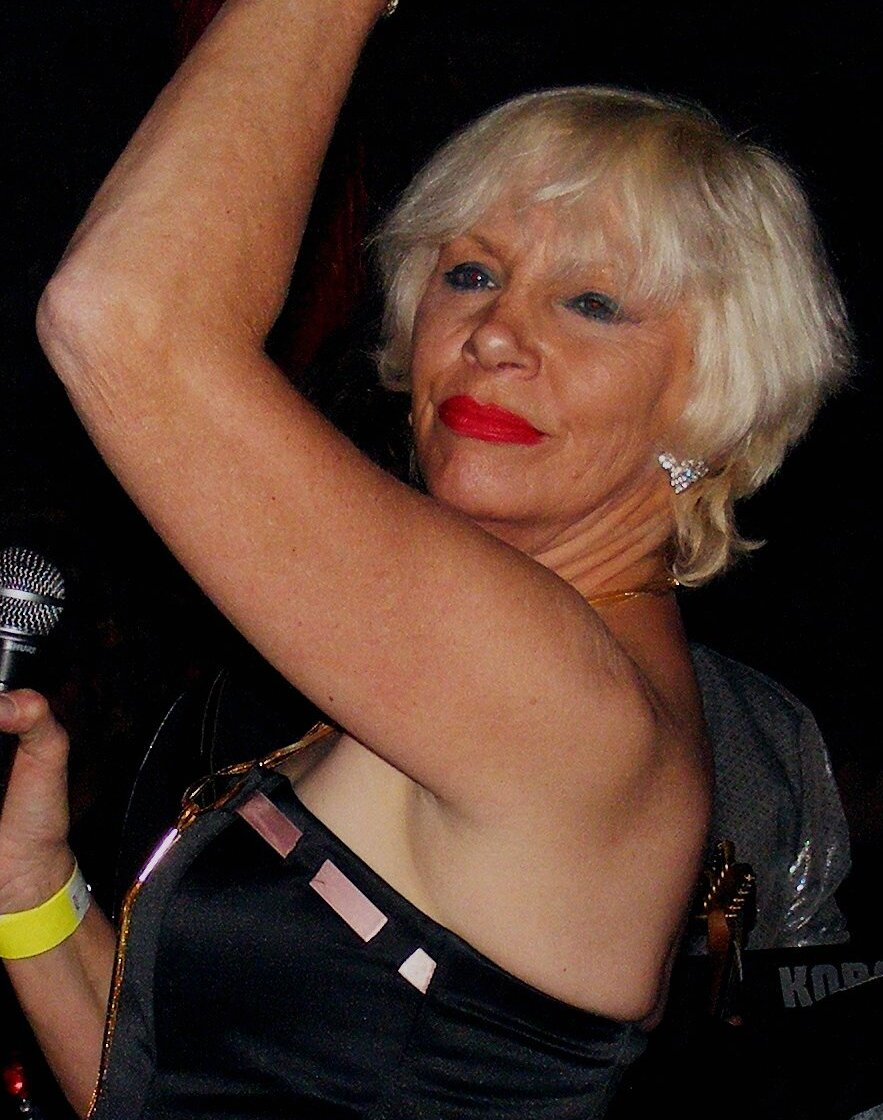
- Bowie in 2010
- Born: Mary Angela Barnett; September 25, 1949 (age 77); Ayios Dhometios, British Cyprus
- Occupations: Model; actress; journalist
- Years active: 1970–present
- Spouse: David Bowie (m. 1970; div. 1980)
- Children: 2, including Duncan

Mary Angela Barnett (born September 25, 1949), known as Angie Bowie, is an American model, actress, and journalist. She was married to David Bowie from 1970 until their divorce in 1980. They had one child, the film director Duncan Jones. She has said that she assisted Bowie by being involved in sewing costumes for Bowie and his band, including the Ziggy Stardust costumes.

== Early life ==
Mary Angela Barnett was born in Ayios Dhometios (then in British Cyprus) on September 25, 1949, the daughter of Canadian mother Helena Maria Galas Barnett and American father George Milton Barnett. Her father was a U.S. Army colonel who later worked as a mining engineer and ran a mill for the Cyprus Mines Corporation. She has a brother who is 16 years older. Both of her parents died in 1984.

Barnett is of English and Polish descent, and was raised Roman Catholic. She does not have Cypriot nationality or passport; however she has identified as Cypriot due to the circumstances of her birth and early life. She was educated in Cyprus, Switzerland, and England (at Kingston Polytechnic), then moved to the U.S. to briefly attend Connecticut College, until she was expelled after she had an affair with a fellow female student.

== Life with David Bowie (1969–1980) ==
Barnett met musician David Bowie in London in 1969, at the age of 19. According to her, they met through their mutual friendship with record executive Calvin Mark Lee. The couple married one year later, on March 19, 1970, at Bromley Register Office in Beckenham Lane, Greater London, after which she was known as Angie Bowie. They had an open marriage. She stated that they were not in love, and the union was a marriage of convenience. She told the Evening Standard: "We got married so that I could work [to get a permit]. I didn't think it would last and David said, before we got married, 'I'm not really in love with you' and I thought that's probably a good thing." He wrote the song "The Prettiest Star" about her. Their son Duncan Zowie Haywood Jones was born on May 30, 1971.

Barnett occasionally appeared as a guest on television talk shows as the wife of David Bowie, such as The Tonight Show in November 1973, and The Mike Douglas Show in early 1975. She auditioned unsuccessfully for the title role in the 1974 television movie Wonder Woman, then, in 1975, she bought the television rights to the Marvel Comics characters Black Widow and Daredevil, hoping to develop and sell a series featuring herself playing Black Widow. The series failed to secure a studio deal, and it never went beyond the development stage. She was named to portray Ruth Ellis in a 1979 film that was not produced. Ellis's daughter Georgie described herself as "indignant" about the casting, feeling that Barnett's "credentials for the role seemed to me to be non-existent".

== Life after David Bowie (1980–present) ==
After nine years of marriage, Angie and David Bowie separated, getting divorced on February 8, 1980, in Switzerland. In the divorce settlement, she received £500,000, paid in instalments, and a 10-year gagging clause. David Bowie got custody of their son. After the divorce, she said she was blackballed from the entertainment industry and was so depressed that she considered suicide.

She has had credited acting roles in at least four films after separating from Bowie: Eat the Rich (1987, as Henry's wife), Demented (1994), Deadrockstar (2002, as Bartender), and La Funcionaria Asesina (The Slayer Bureaucrat, 2009, as Helen Price/Constance); and appeared as herself in the concert film Ziggy Stardust and the Spiders from Mars (1973) and Glitter Goddess of Sunset Strip (1991). In March 1982, she appeared on the television program The Old Grey Whistle Test, reciting poetry, while Mick Karn, from the band Japan, played bass. Her performance was lambasted by the British media. During January 2016, she appeared on Celebrity Big Brother 17, during which she was informed of David Bowie's death, leaving the show shortly after.

Angela Bowie has written two autobiographies: Free Spirit (1981, including samples of the author's poetry), as well as Backstage Passes: Life On the Wild Side with David Bowie, published in 1993 and updated in 2000. It detailed her alleged drug-fueled and openly bisexual lifestyle with her former husband and many other well-known musicians. In 2014, she produced a large book about sex titled Pop Sex as well as a book about cats titled Cat-Astrophe. In 2015, she released the book Fancy Footwork: Poetry Collection.

The CD maxi-single "The World Is Changing", with six mixes, including prominent vocal support by Dabonda Simmons, was credited to Angie Bowie with co-composers David Padilla, Morgan Lekcirt, Tom Reich, Jim Durban and D.J. Trance. It appeared in 1996 on New York label Warlock Records (distributed in Europe through Music Avenue on the Nite Blue label). The cover featured a logo of the Bowie name clearly modeled on the one seen on her former husband's Let's Dance releases. The album Moon Goddess was released in 2002 on the record label The Electric Label.

She sang with Subterraneans vocalist Jude Rawlins on a version of the Rolling Stones song "The Last Time", also included on the 2003 Subterraneans album Orly Flight.

In 2002, she wrote a Pocket Essentials book titled Bisexuality. In 2012 Bowie served as a "roving reporter" for a transgender magazine called Frock Magazine.

== Personal life ==
Before the end of her marriage to David Bowie, she had a long-term relationship with punk musician Drew Blood (born Andrew Lipka); they had a daughter, Stacia Larranna Celeste Lipka (also referred to as Stasha) born in July 1980. She later lived in Tucson, Arizona.

In 1993, she began a relationship with Michael Gassett, an electrical engineer nearly 20 years her junior. As of 2016 they lived in Acworth, Georgia.

Barnett is estranged from her son Duncan Jones, saying in a 2010 interview that a reconciliation was unlikely. She previously said that, although she has not seen her son since he was 13, he had been in very brief contact with her daughter Stasha in the early 2000s. "He emailed me and I didn't know what to say. So I put them together. They corresponded for a bit and then that stopped. He is cold, like his father. David cut me off. Zowie, or Duncan, cut me and Stasha off", she said. She has not been in contact with her son since David Bowie's death.

Angie Bowie has long claimed to have inspired The Rolling Stones' 1973 song "Angie". However, the songwriters Mick Jagger and Keith Richards have consistently denied this – Richards explaining that the title refers to his daughter, Angela.

== Fictional portrayals ==
The fictional character of Mandy, portrayed by Toni Collette in the film Velvet Goldmine, was based upon Angie Bowie.

== Bibliography ==
- Free Spirit (as Angie Barnett). Mushroom Books, 1981.
- Backstage Passes (as Angela Barnett). Jove Books, The Berkeley Publishing Group, 1993.
- Bisexuality (Pocket Essentials), 2002
