= Aladdin Sane =

1973 studio album by David Bowie

Studio album by David Bowie
- Released: 13 April 1973 (Note: Print sources had previously reported as 13 April 1973. In 2018, Bowie's official website stated that new evidence indicated the official release date was 20 April, but that because this was Good Friday (a public holiday in the UK), the album was made available one day earlier. In 2023, the website stated the "made available" date of 19 April was the original release date. According to Benoît Clerc's book David Bowie All the Songs (2022), the US release date was 13 April and the UK release date was 19 April.)
- Recorded: 6 October, December 1972 – January 1973
- Studios: Trident (London); RCA (New York City)
- Genres: Glam rock; hard rock
- Length: 41:32
- Label: RCA Victor
- Producers: Ken Scott; David Bowie

David Bowie chronology
Images 1966–1967 (1973)	Aladdin Sane (1973)	Pin Ups (1973)

Singles from Aladdin Sane
- 1. "The Jean Genie" Released: 24 November 1972; 2. "Drive-In Saturday" Released: 6 April 1973; 3. "Time" Released: April 1973; 4. "Let's Spend the Night Together" Released: July 1973

Aladdin Sane is the sixth studio album by the English musician David Bowie, released in April 1973 through RCA Records. The follow-up to his breakthrough The Rise and Fall of Ziggy Stardust and the Spiders from Mars (1972), it was the first album he wrote and released after achieving global stardom.

The album was co-produced by Bowie and Ken Scott and features contributions from Bowie's backing band the Spiders from Mars (Mick Ronson, Trevor Bolder and Mick Woodmansey), along with pianist Mike Garson, two saxophonists and three backing vocalists. Recorded in London and New York City between legs of the Ziggy Stardust Tour, the record was Bowie's final album with the full Spiders lineup.

Most of the tracks were written on the road in the US and are greatly influenced by Bowie's perceptions of the country. Due to the American influence and the fast-paced songwriting, the record features more hard rock influences than his earlier glam rock. The lyrics reflect the pros of Bowie's newfound stardom and the cons of touring and contain images of urban decay, drugs, sex, violence and death. Some of the songs are influenced by the Rolling Stones; a cover of their song "Let's Spend the Night Together" is included. Bowie described the album's title as a pun ("A Lad Insane") and as "Ziggy Stardust goes to America". The cover artwork, shot by Brian Duffy and featuring a lightning bolt across Bowie's face, is regarded as one of his most iconic images.

Accompanied by the UK top-five singles "The Jean Genie" and "Drive-In Saturday", Aladdin Sane was Bowie's most commercially successful record up to that point, topping the UK Albums Chart and garnering him immense popularity there. It also received positive reviews from music critics, although many found it inferior to its predecessor. The popularity continued throughout the latter half of the Ziggy Stardust Tour, which featured various setlist and stage production changes. In later decades, Aladdin Sane has appeared on several best-of lists and is viewed as one of Bowie's essential releases. It has been reissued several times and was remastered in 2013 for its 40th anniversary, which was included on the 2015 box set Five Years (1969–1973).

== Background and writing ==
Aladdin Sane was my idea of rock and roll America. Here I was on this great tour circuit, not enjoying it very much. So inevitably my writing reflected that, this kind of schizophrenia that I was going through. Wanting to be up on stage performing my songs, but on the other hand not really wanting to be on those buses with all those strange people. Being basically a quiet person, it was hard to come to terms. So Aladdin Sane was split down the middle.

— David Bowie on the theme of the album

David Bowie launched to stardom in early July 1972 through the release of his fifth studio album The Rise and Fall of Ziggy Stardust and the Spiders from Mars and his performance of "Starman" on BBC's Top of the Pops. He promoted the record through the Ziggy Stardust Tour in the United Kingdom and the United States, writing new songs on the road that appeared on his next album.

Aladdin Sane was the first album Bowie wrote and released from a position of stardom. Writing new material on the US leg of the tour in late 1972, many of the tracks were influenced by America and his perceptions of the country. The biographer Christopher Sandford believes the album showed that Bowie "was simultaneously appalled and fixated by America". The tour, combined with other side projects during the period, such as co-producing Lou Reed's Transformer and mixing the Stooges' Raw Power, took a toll on Bowie's mental health, further influencing his writing. Due to being on the road, Bowie was unsure of the new album's direction, believing he had said what he wanted to say about Ziggy Stardust, but knew he would "end up doing ... 'Ziggy Part 2'". He stated: "There was a point in '73 where I knew it was all over. I didn't want to be trapped in this Ziggy character all my life. And I guess what I was doing on Aladdin Sane, I was trying to move into the next area – but using a rather pale imitation of Ziggy as a secondary device. In my mind, it was Ziggy Goes to Washington: Ziggy under the influence of America."

Rather than continue the Ziggy Stardust character directly, Bowie decided to create a new persona, Aladdin Sane, who reflected the theme of "Ziggy goes to America" and, according to Bowie, was less defined and "clear cut" than Ziggy, and "pretty ephemeral". According to the biographer David Buckley, the character was a "schizoid amalgamation" that was reflected in the music.

== Recording ==
Aladdin Sane was mainly recorded between December 1972 and January 1973 between tour legs. Like his two previous records, it was co-produced by Bowie and Ken Scott and featured Bowie's backing band the Spiders from Mars – the guitarist Mick Ronson, the bassist Trevor Bolder and the drummer Mick Woodmansey. (Note: Bowie's manager Tony Defries originally wanted to enlist Phil Spector to produce the album, but after receiving no response from Spector, Bowie invited Scott back to co-produce.) The lineup also featured the pianist Mike Garson, who was hired by Bowie at the suggestion of the RCA executive Ken Glancey and the singer-songwriter Annette Peacock; he remained with Bowie's entourage for the next three years. The pianist came from a jazz and blues background, which the biographer Nicholas Pegg believes veered the album from pure rock 'n' roll and expanded Bowie's experimental horizons. Buckley called Aladdin Sane the beginning of Bowie's "experimental phase" and cited Garson's presence as "revolutionary". Scott noted that Garson added elements to the arrangements that were not there before, including more keyboards and synthesisers. Garson later said that Scott as producer "got the best piano sound out of any of his performances for Bowie." The pianist was given a lot of attention from Bowie in the studio, who mainly wanted to see what Garson could do. Other musicians hired for the album and tour included the saxophonists Ken Fordham and Brian Wilshaw; the singers Juanita Franklin and Linda Lewis as backing vocalists; and longtime friend Geoffrey MacCormack (later known as Warren Peace), who subsequently appeared on later Bowie records in the 1970s.

The first song recorded for the album was "The Jean Genie" on 6 October 1972 at RCA Studios in New York City, after which the band and crew continued the tour in Chicago. Bowie produced the session himself. The band reconvened in New York with Scott in December, recording "Drive-In Saturday" and "All the Young Dudes", a track Bowie wrote and gave to the English band Mott the Hoople. Recording sessions continued in January 1973 at Trident Studios in London following the conclusion of the American tour and a series of UK Christmas concerts. Tracks recorded at Trident included album tracks "Panic in Detroit", "Aladdin Sane", "Cracked Actor", "Lady Grinning Soul", "Watch That Man" and "Time"; outtakes included the "sax version" of the 1972 non-album single "John, I'm Only Dancing" and "1984", left off Aladdin Sane and placed on Diamond Dogs (1974). (Note: According to O'Leary, the cover of "Let's Spend the Night Together" was recorded at either RCA or Trident. The re-recording of "The Prettiest Star" is also disputed as either at RCA, or Trident.) A provisional running order included the remade "John, I'm Only Dancing" and an unknown track titled "Zion". (Note: While Pegg doubts the existence of "Zion", as it is not registered with any of Bowie's music publishers, Cann writes that Rykodisc considered it for inclusion on the 1990 reissue of Aladdin Sane but Bowie rejected it.) The sessions concluded on 24 January.

== Music and lyrics ==
We wanted to take it ... much rougher. Ziggy was rock and roll but polished rock and roll. [Bowie] wanted certain tracks [on Aladdin Sane] to go like the Rolling Stones and unpolished rock and roll.

— Ken Scott on the album's sound

Like Ziggy Stardust, Aladdin Sane is predominantly glam rock, with elements of hard rock. The album's American influence and fast-paced development added a tougher, rawer and edgier rock sound. Some of the songs, including "Watch That Man", "Drive-In Saturday" and "Lady Grinning Soul" are influenced by the Rolling Stones; a cover of their song "Let's Spend the Night Together" is included.

According to Pegg, the album's lyrics paint pictures of urban decay, degenerate lives, drug addiction, violence and death. He says that some themes present on Bowie's previous works also appear in Aladdin Sane, including "notions of religion shattered by science, extraterrestrial encounters posing as messianic visitations, the impact on society of different kinds of 'star' and the degradation of human life in a spiritual void." The author James E. Perone states that thematically, the album deals with "the concept and definition of sanity", while Ric Albano of Classic Rock Review wrote that the music reflects the pros of newfound stardom and the cons of the perils of touring.

=== Side one ===
The opening track, "Watch That Man", was written in response to seeing two concerts by the American rock band New York Dolls. According to the author Peter Doggett, the Dolls' first two albums were important in representing the American response to the British glam rock movement. Bowie was impressed with their sound and wanted to emulate it on a song. Pegg describes "Watch That Man" as "a sleazy garage rocker" heavily influenced by the Rolling Stones, specifically their song "Brown Sugar" (1971). The mix, in which Bowie's lead vocal is buried beneath the instrumental sections, has been heavily criticised by critics and fans. Biographers compare it to the contemporaneous sound of Elton John and the Stones' Exile on Main St. (1972).

"Aladdin Sane (1913–1938–197?)" was inspired by Evelyn Waugh's 1930 novel Vile Bodies, which Bowie read during his trip on the RHMS Ellinis back to the UK. Described by Buckley as the album's "pivotal" song, it saw Bowie exploring more experimental genres, rather than strict rock 'n' roll. It features a piano solo by Garson, who had originally attempted a blues solo and Latin solo, which were politely rejected by Bowie, who asked him to play something more akin to the avant-garde jazz genre that Garson had come from. Improvised and recorded in one take, Buckley considers the solo a "landmark" recording. Doggett similarly believes that the track's landscape belongs to Garson.

"Drive-In Saturday" was written following an overnight train ride between Seattle and Phoenix in early November 1972. He witnessed a row of silver domes in the distance and assumed they were secret government facilities used for a post-nuclear fallout. In the track, the radiation has affected people's minds and bodies to the point that they need to watch films in order to learn to have sex again. It is heavily influenced by 1950s doo-wop music, and presents a contemporary update to the 1950s drive-in culture. As Bowie was influenced by Jungian ideas around creativity and madness, the artist Tanja Stark suggests the song's lyrical reference to Jung "crashing out with sylvian" allude to Jung's Red Book hallucinations possibly originating from the Sylvian fissure in the brain.

"Panic in Detroit" was inspired by Iggy Pop's stories of the Detroit riots in 1967 and the rise of the White Panther Party, specifically their leader John Sinclair. Bowie compared the ideas of Sinclair to the rebel martyr Che Guevara for the narrator in "Panic in Detroit". The lyrics are dark, featuring images of urban decay, violence, drugs, emotional isolation and suicide, adding to the album's overarching theme of alienation. Musically, the song itself is built around a Bo Diddley beat; Pegg considers Ronson's guitar part very "bluesy".

"Cracked Actor" was written following Bowie's stay at Sunset Boulevard in Los Angeles, where he witnessed prostitutes, drug use and sex. The song's narrator is an aging film star whose life is beginning to decline; he is "stiff on his legend" and encounters a prostitute, whom he despises. There are numerous double entendres regarding film stardom and sex: "show me you're real/reel", "smack, baby, smack" and "you've made a bad connection". Doggett describes the song as predominantly hard rock, with only a hint of glam, while Pegg describes Ronson's guitar as "dirty blues".

=== Side two ===
"Time" was originally written as "We Should Be On By Now" for Bowie's friend George Underwood, with vastly different lyrics. The song was then rewritten, influenced by the death of New York Dolls drummer Billy Murcia and the concepts of relativity and mortality. The song's use of the word "wanking" led to it being banned by the BBC from radio stations. Garson's stride and Brechtian cabaret-style piano dominates the track while Ronson plays a similar line on guitar.

"The Prettiest Star" was originally released in 1970 as the follow-up single to "Space Oddity" (1969). It was written for Bowie's first wife Angela Barnett, whom he married shortly after the original's release. The subsequent rerecording on Aladdin Sane was glam-influenced, and featured Marc Bolan's original guitar part mimicked almost note-for-note by Ronson. Buckley calls the rerecording a "revamped and much improved" version. Doggett argues that the song appeared out of place on Aladdin Sane, while Pegg finds that the references to "screen starlets" and "the movies in the past" mesh with the album's other nostalgic references.

"Let's Spend the Night Together" is the only cover song on the album. Written by Mick Jagger and Keith Richards and recorded by the Rolling Stones in 1967, the song's appearance on Aladdin Sane acknowledges the influence of the Stones on the entire record. While the original was psychedelic, Bowie's rendition is faster, raunchier and more glam-influenced. It features synthesisers that Pegg believes give the track a "fresh, futuristic sheen". Several critics also consider it a gay appropriation of a heterosexual song. The cover has been criticised in the ensuing decades as camp and unsatisfying.

"The Jean Genie" began as an impromptu jam titled "Bussin'" on the charter bus when travelling between Cleveland and Memphis. The Bo Diddley-inspired guitar riff is a variation of the Yardbirds' "I'm a Man" and "Smokestack Lightning". Bowie called it "a smorgasbord of imagined Americana" and his "first New York song", he wrote the lyrics to "entertain" Warhol associate Cyrinda Foxe, who appeared in the song's accompanied music video. The music is heavily blues-influenced, leading Perone to contest: "This piece exudes the British blues spirit like no previous Bowie song." The lyrics were also an ode to Iggy Pop, Bowie calling the song's character a "white-trash, kind of trailer-park kid thing – the closet intellectual who wouldn't want the world to know that he reads".

"Lady Grinning Soul" was one of the final songs written for the album. It was also a last-minute addition, replacing the "sax version" of "John, I'm Only Dancing" as the closing track. A possible inspiration for the song is the American soul singer Claudia Lennear, whom Bowie met during the US tour and also inspired the Rolling Stones' "Brown Sugar", (Note: After Bowie's death, Lennear revealed that he personally contacted and informed her "Lady Grinning Soul" was about her.) although the critic Chris O'Leary argues that the inspiration was the French singer Amanda Lear, a sometime girlfriend of Bowie's. Unlike other tracks on the album, "Lady Grinning Soul" has a sexual ambiance, lushness and serenity, and features what biographers describe as a Spanish-influenced acoustic guitar break from Ronson and a Latin-style piano part from Garson. The track has been described as a lost James Bond theme.

== Title and artwork ==
The title is a pun on "A Lad Insane", which at one point was expected to be the title. When writing the album during the tour, it was under the working title Love Aladdin Vein, which Bowie said at the time felt right, but decided to change it partly due to its drug connotations.

The cover artwork features a shirtless Bowie with red hair and a red-and-blue lightning bolt splitting his face in two while a teardrop runs down his collarbone. It was shot in January 1973 by Brian Duffy in his north London studio. (Note: Duffy later photographed the sleeves for Lodger (1979) and Scary Monsters (and Super Creeps) (1980).) In an effort to ensure RCA promoted the album extensively, Bowie's manager Tony Defries was determined to make the cover as costly as possible. He insisted on an unprecedented seven-colour system, rather than the usual four. The image was the most expensive cover art ever made at the time. The make-up designer was artist Pierre Laroche, who remained Bowie's make-up artist for the remainder of the 1973 tour and the Pin Ups cover shoot. Cann writes that Duffy and Laroche copied the lightning bolt from a National Panasonic rice-cooker in the studio. The make-up was completed with a "deathly purple wash", which Cann believes, together with Bowie's closed eyes, evoke a "death mask". The final photo was selected from a group featuring Bowie looking directly at the camera. These photos later became a signature image of the V&A's David Bowie Is exhibition. The shoot was the only time Bowie wore the design on his face, but it was later used for hanging backdrops at live performances.

Duffy believed that Bowie's inspiration for the "flash" design came from a ring once worn by Elvis Presley; it featured the letters TCB (an abbreviation for Taking Care of Business) with a lightning flash. Pegg believes the cover has a deeper meaning, representing the "split down the middle" personality of the Aladdin Sane character and reflecting Bowie's split feelings regarding the US tour and his newfound stardom. The teardrop on his chest was Duffy's idea; Bowie said the photographer "just popped it in there. I thought it was rather sweet." It was airbrushed by Philip Castle, who also helped create the silvery effect on Bowie's body on the sleeve. Regarded as one of the most iconic images of Bowie, it was called "the Mona Lisa of album covers" by The Guardian's Mick McCann and one of the 50 greatest album covers of all time by Billboard in 2022. Pegg calls it "perhaps the most celebrated image of Bowie's long career".

Upon release, the cover was polarising. According to Cann, some were offended and bewildered at Bowie's appearance, while others found it daring. Henry Edwards of The New York Times initially described the image as "the most cunning representation to date of this angel-faced, 25-year-old, English composer-performer as a disembodied spirit of the Space Age". In retrospect, Cann argues that a cover like Aladdin Sane's can be a risky move for artists whose success is relatively recent. Later publications have compared the lightning bolt design to that of the flag of the British Union of Fascists.

== Release ==
RCA issued "The Jean Genie" as the lead single on 24 November 1972. In its advertising, the label said it was "the first single to come from Bowie's triumphant American tour". The song charted at number two on the UK Singles Chart, making it Bowie's biggest hit to date. The single fared worse in the US, reaching number 71 on the Billboard Hot 100. It was promoted with a video by Mick Rock, featuring bits of concert footage shot in San Francisco in late October 1972, interspersed with shots of Bowie posing around the Mars Hotel and actress Cyrinda Foxe. The second single, "Drive-In Saturday", was released in the UK on 6 April 1973. Like the previous single, it was a commercial success, peaking at number three in the UK. "Time" was issued as a single in the US and Japan in April, and "Let's Spend the Night Together" in the US and Europe in July. In 1974, Lulu released a version of "Watch That Man" as the B-side to her single "The Man Who Sold the World", produced by Bowie and Ronson.

Aladdin Sane was originally released in the US on 13 April 1973 and in the UK six days later on 19 April. With a purported 100,000 copies ordered in advance, the LP debuted at the top of the UK Albums Chart, where it remained for five weeks. In the US, where Bowie already had three albums on the charts, Aladdin Sane reached number 17 on the Billboard Top LPs & Tape chart, making it Bowie's most successful record commercially in both countries to that date. According to Pegg, this feat was unheard of at the time and guaranteed Aladdin Sane's status as Britain's best-selling album since "the days of the Beatles". Elsewhere, the album reached the top five in France, the Netherlands and Sweden, and the top ten in Australia. Aladdin Sane is estimated to have sold 4.6 million copies worldwide, making it one of Bowie's highest-selling LPs. The Guinness Book of British Hit Albums notes that Bowie "ruled the [British] album chart, accumulating an unprecedented 182 weeks on the list in 1973 with six different titles." Following Bowie's death in 2016, Aladdin Sane reentered the US charts, reaching number 16 on the Billboard Top Pop Catalog Albums chart the week of 29 January 2016, where it remained for three weeks. It also peaked at number six on the Billboard Vinyl Albums the week of 18 March 2016, remaining on the chart for four weeks.

== Critical reception ==
Critical reaction to Aladdin Sane was generally laudatory, if more enthusiastic in the US than in the UK. Ben Gerson of Rolling Stone remarked on "Bowie's provocative melodies, audacious lyrics, masterful arrangements (with Mick Ronson) and production (with Ken Scott)", and pronounced it "less manic than The Man Who Sold The World, and less intimate than Hunky Dory, with none of its attacks of self-doubt." Billboard called it a combination of "raw energy with explosive rock". In The New York Times, Edwards described Aladdin Sane as "the most expressive, if still uneven, album of his recording career". In the British music press, letters columns accused Bowie of 'selling out' and Let It Rock magazine found the album to be more style than substance, considering that he had "nothing to say and everything to say it with". Similarly, Kim Fowley of Phonograph Record considered the record bad, save for "Time" and "The Prettiest Star". Fowley found the record's flaws to be "over-verbalised multi-symbolistic lyrics", not enough collaboration with Ronson when making it and the presence of Garson on piano.

Other British writers gave more positive assessments, with Val Mabbs of Record Mirror citing it as Bowie's best work up to that point. Also writing for Phonograph Record, Ron Ross stated that with the record, Bowie has proven himself to be "one of the most consistent and fast-moving artists since the Beatles". Ross considered side one "the tightest, and probably the best, work Bowie has ever recorded". The writer Charles Shaar Murray of the NME felt Aladdin Sane was a strong contender for album of the year, further calling it "a worthy contribution to the most important body of musical work produced in this decade". The Village Voice critic Robert Christgau wrote a few years later that his favorite Bowie album had been Aladdin Sane, "the fragmented, rather second-hand collection of elegant hard rock songs (plus one Jacques Brel-style clinker) that fell between the Ziggy Stardust and Diamond Dogs concepts. That Bowie improved his music by imitating the Rolling Stones rather than by expressing himself is obviously a tribute to the Stones, but it also underlines how expedient Bowie's relationship to rock and roll has always been."

== Tour ==
In February 1973, shortly after Aladdin Sane was completed, Bowie and the band returned to the road for the final portion of the Ziggy Stardust Tour, which Pegg refers to as the "Aladdin Sane Tour". The same personnel from the album returned for the tour, with the addition of the guitarist John Hutchinson, who had previously performed with Bowie in various projects throughout the late 1960s. With the exception of "Lady Grinning Soul", all tracks from Aladdin Sane were added to the setlist. Bowie drastically increased his stage demeanor for this portion of the tour, becoming more open and ambiguous compared to the shy persona of previous performances. He also underwent numerous costume changes during the shows, even representing the Aladdin Sane character through the use of mime and masks.

This portion of the tour commenced in the United States before continuing to Japan in April. Bowie's stage presence was praised by Japanese audiences and reviewers. On his arrival back to the UK in early May, where Aladdin Sane had just topped the chart, Bowie's popularity had soared in his home country; the final UK leg of the tour sold out completely. The UK leg made small setlist changes and introduced backdrop banners containing the blue and red lightning bolt Bowie donned on the Aladdin Sane cover artwork. Despite a disastrous first show at London's Earls Court Arena, the remaining dates were successful, receiving acclaim from reviewers and audiences.

The final date of the tour was 3 July 1973, which was performed at the Hammersmith Odeon in London. The performance was documented by filmmaker D. A. Pennebaker in a documentary and concert film, which premiered in 1979 and commercially released in 1983 as Ziggy Stardust and the Spiders from Mars, with an accompanying soundtrack album titled Ziggy Stardust: The Motion Picture. At this show, Bowie made the sudden surprise announcement that the show was "the last show that we'll ever do", later understood to mean that he was retiring his Ziggy Stardust persona. Although Ronson was told in advance, Bolder and Woodmansey were not, which led to rising tensions between the two and Bowie. Additional conflicts regarding compensation led to Woodmansey's dismissal from the Spiders in July. Bowie's next album, Pin Ups—a covers album devised as a "stop-gap" record to appease RCA—was recorded during the summer of 1973, released in October, and was Bowie's final album recorded with the Spiders, by then comprising only Ronson and Bolder.

== Legacy ==
Retrospective professional ratings
Review scores
Source	Rating
AllMusic	4.5/5 stars
Blender	4/5 stars
Chicago Tribune	4/4 stars
Christgau's Record Guide	B+
Encyclopedia of Popular Music	4/5 stars
Mojo	5/5 stars
New Musical Express	9/10
Pitchfork	9.0/10
Q	4/5 stars
Rolling Stone	4/5 stars
The Rolling Stone Album Guide	5/5 stars
Spin Alternative Record Guide	7/10

Retrospectively, Aladdin Sane has received positive reviews from music critics but most reviewers have unfavorably compared it to its predecessor. Stephen Thomas Erlewine of AllMusic believed that Aladdin Sane followed the same pattern as Ziggy Stardust, but for "both better and worse". While he praised the album for presenting unusual genres and being lyrically different, he criticised Bowie's cover of the Rolling Stones' "Let's Spend the Night Together", calling it "oddly clueless", and contended that "there's no distinctive sound or theme to make [a cohesive record]; it's Bowie riding the wake of Ziggy Stardust, which means there's a wealth of classic material here, but not enough focus to make the album itself a classic". Pitchfork's Douglas Wolk also found it too similar to its predecessor, calling it "effectively Ziggy Stardust II, a harder-rocking if less original variation on the hit album". He writes that while Ziggy Stardust ended with a "vision of outreach to the front row" in the lyrics of "Rock 'n' Roll Suicide", Aladdin Sane is "all alienation and self-conscious artifice, parodic gestures of intimacy directed to the theater balcony". NME editors Roy Carr and Murray called the album "oddly unsatisfying, considerably less than the sum of the parts". In a 2013 readers' poll for Rolling Stone, Aladdin Sane was voted Bowie's sixth best record. The magazine argued that it proved Bowie was not a "one-album wonder".

Like music critics, Bowie's biographers have mostly compared Aladdin Sane to its predecessor unfavourably. Pegg writes that it feels more rushed than Ziggy. Carr and Murray contend that "It was all too obvious that the heat was on ... The songs were written too fast, recorded too fast and mixed too fast." Marc Spitz states that Bowie might have moved on from the Ziggy persona sooner had it not been for the pressure from his music publisher MainMan. Despite the record being critically viewed as inferior to its predecessor, Spitz calls it one of Bowie's classics and the songs "top-notch", and felt it ultimately showed that at the time Bowie was "still way ahead of the game". Pegg calls it "one of the most urgent, compelling and essential of Bowie's albums".

It was almost like a treading-water album ... but funnily enough, in retrospect, for me it's the more successful album, because it's more informed about rock'n'roll than Ziggy was.

— David Bowie discussing Aladdin Sane in the 1990s

Biographer Paul Trynka describes it as both "slicker and sketchier" than Ziggy, and argues that "[it] is in some ways a more convincing document on the nature of fame and show business than [its predecessor]". Doggett similarly describes Aladdin Sane as arguably a more "real" and "rewarding" album than its predecessor, with a "Stones-inspired, vivid production" outdoing the "somewhat flat sonic canvas" of Ziggy, but concludes that while Ziggy is more than the sum of its parts and has a long-lasting legacy, Aladdin Sane is "its songs, its sleeve, and nothing more". Perone finds the record not as accessible as its predecessor, deducing that with less "melodic and harmonic hooks" and lyrics that are "darker and more inwardly focused and analytical", the result is an album that is "not as well remembered" as Ziggy. Billboard's Joe Lynch considered Aladdin Sane just as influential on glam rock as a whole as its predecessor. He states that both records "ensured [Bowie's] long-term career and infamy" and argues that both "transcended" the genre, are "works of art", and are not just "glam classics", but "rock classics".

In 2003, Aladdin Sane was ranked among six Bowie entries on Rolling Stone's list of the 500 Greatest Albums of All Time (at number 277), and 279 in a 2012 revised list. It was later ranked 77th on Pitchfork's list of the top 100 albums of the 1970s. In 2013, NME ranked the album 230th in their list of the 500 Greatest Albums of All Time. It was voted number 146 in the third edition of Colin Larkin's All Time Top 1000 Albums. The album was also included in the 2018 edition of Robert Dimery's book 1001 Albums You Must Hear Before You Die.

== Reissues ==
Aladdin Sane has been reissued several times. Although the original 1973 vinyl release featured a gatefold cover, some later LP versions such as RCA's 1980 US reissue presented the album in a standard non-gatefold sleeve. The album was first released on CD in 1984 by RCA. In 1990, Dr. Toby Mountain at Northeastern Digital, Southborough, Massachusetts, remastered Aladdin Sane from the original master tapes for Rykodisc, released with no bonus tracks. It was again remastered in 1999 by Peter Mew at Abbey Road Studios for EMI and Virgin Records, and once more released with no bonus tracks.

In 2003, a two-disc version was released by EMI/Virgin. The second in a series of 30th Anniversary 2CD Edition sets (along with Ziggy Stardust and Diamond Dogs), this release includes a remastered version of the album on the first disc. The second disc contains ten tracks, a few of which had been previously released on the 1989 collection Sound + Vision. A 40th anniversary edition, remastered by Ray Staff at London's AIR Studios, was released in CD and digital download formats in April 2013. This 2013 remaster of the album was included in the 2015 box set Five Years 1969–1973 and rereleased separately, in 2015–2016, in CD, vinyl and digital formats. A 12" limited edition of the 2013 remaster, pressed in silver vinyl, was released in 2018 to mark the 45th anniversary of the album. To celebrate its 50th anniversary, the album was reissued on 14 April 2023 in vinyl picture disc and half-speed-mastered versions.

== Track listing ==
All tracks are written by David Bowie, except "Let's Spend the Night Together", written by Mick Jagger and Keith Richards.

Side one
No.	Title	Length
1.	"Watch That Man"	4:30
2.	"Aladdin Sane (1913-1938-197?)"	5:15
3.	"Drive-In Saturday"	4:38
4.	"Panic in Detroit"	4:30
5.	"Cracked Actor"	3:01

Side two
No.	Title	Length
6.	"Time"	5:10
7.	"The Prettiest Star"	3:28
8.	"Let's Spend the Night Together"	3:10
9.	"The Jean Genie"	4:06
10.	"Lady Grinning Soul"	3:53

=== Notes ===
- On the original UK LP label, each track (sans "Let's Spend the Night Together") was ascribed a location to indicate where it was written or took its inspiration: New York ("Watch That Man"); Seattle–Phoenix ("Drive-In Saturday"); Detroit ("Panic in Detroit"); Los Angeles ("Cracked Actor"); New Orleans ("Time"); Detroit and New York ("The Jean Genie"); RHMS Ellinis, the vessel that had carried Bowie home in December 1972 ("Aladdin Sane"); London ("Lady Grinning Soul") and Gloucester Road ("The Prettiest Star").

== Personnel ==
According to the liner notes and the biographer Nicholas Pegg:

- David Bowie – lead vocals, guitar, harmonica, saxophone, synthesiser, Mellotron
- Mick Ronson – guitar, piano, backing vocals
- Trevor Bolder – bass guitar
- Mick "Woody" Woodmansey – drums
- Mike Garson – piano
- Ken Fordham – saxophone
- Brian "Bux" Wilshaw – saxophone, flutes
- Juanita "Honey" Franklin – backing vocals
- Linda Lewis – backing vocals
- G.A. MacCormack – backing vocals

Production

- David Bowie – producer, arrangements
- Ken Scott – producer, engineer, mixer
- Mick Moran – engineer
- Mick Ronson – arrangements, mixer

== Charts and certifications ==
=== Weekly charts ===
1973 weekly chart performance for Aladdin Sane
Chart (1973)	Peak Position
Australian Albums (Go-Set)	4
Australian Albums (Kent Music Report)	7
Canadian Albums (RPM)	20
Dutch Albums (MegaCharts)	4
Finnish Albums (Suomen virallinen lista)	2
French Albums (SNEP)	3
Italian Albums (Musica e dischi)	8
Japanese Albums (Oricon)	41
Norwegian Albums (VG-lista)	11
Swedish Albums (Sverigetopplistan)	5
UK Albums (Official Charts)	1
US Billboard Top LPs & Tape	17

2003 weekly chart performance for Aladdin Sane
Chart (2003)	Peak Position
Italian Albums (FIMI)	53
UK Rock & Metal Albums (Official Charts)	9

2013 weekly chart performance for Aladdin Sane
Chart (2013)	Peak Position
Belgian Albums (Ultratop Flanders)	162
Irish Albums (IRMA)	37

2016 weekly chart performance for Aladdin Sane
Chart (2016)	Peak Position
Australian Albums (ARIA)	33
US Billboard Vinyl Albums	6
US Billboard Catalog Albums	16

2023 chart performance for Aladdin Sane
Chart (2023)	Peak position
German Albums (Offizielle Top 100)	65
Hungarian Albums (MAHASZ)	8

=== Year-end charts ===
1973 year-end chart performance for Aladdin Sane
Chart (1973)	Position
French Albums (SNEP)	39
UK Albums (OCC)	2

=== Certifications ===
Sales and certifications for Aladdin Sane
Region	Certification	Certified units/sales
France (SNEP)	Gold	100,000^{*}
United Kingdom (BPI) 1999 release	Gold	100,000^{^}
United Kingdom (BPI) 2015 release	Platinum	300,000^{‡}
United States (RIAA)	Gold	500,000^{^}
Summaries
Worldwide	—	4,600,000
^{*} Sales figures based on certification alone.^{^} Shipments figures based on certification alone.^{‡} Sales+streaming figures based on certification alone.
