= The Spiders from Mars =

David Bowie's band in the early 1970s

Spiders from Mars
- Genres: Glam rock; proto-punk
- Years active: 1970–1973; 1975–1976
- Label: Castle Music Ltd.
- Past members: David Bowie; Mick Ronson; Trevor Bolder; Mick Woodmansey; Mike Garson; Dave Black; Pete McDonald; Aynsley Dunbar

The Spiders from Mars were the English singer David Bowie's backing band in the early 1970s, and initially consisted of Mick Ronson on guitars, Trevor Bolder on bass guitar, and Mick Woodmansey on drums.

The group had its origins in Bowie's earlier backing outfit the Hype, which featured Ronson and Woodmansey, but Tony Visconti on bass. They were briefly signed as a band on its own, known as Ronno. With Bolder taking over bass, they were subsequently named via the landmark 1972 Bowie concept album, The Rise and Fall of Ziggy Stardust and the Spiders from Mars, and were billed as such on the accompanying large-scale Ziggy Stardust Tour. Bowie had originally wanted keyboardist Rick Wakeman, then a member of the Strawbs, to join the band, having played on Bowie's second album and on Hunky Dory; Wakeman declined and instead joined the progressive rock band Yes. Wakeman would feature uncredited on the album, and would collaborate with Bowie again on "Absolute Beginners".

The band would move through a series of keyboard players culminating in Mike Garson. The Spiders from Mars were present again on Bowie's 1973 album, Aladdin Sane. Another leg of the tour followed that year, with the final show captured in the film, Ziggy Stardust and the Spiders from Mars. With Aynsley Dunbar replacing Woodmansey, the band made the 1980 Floor Show in late 1973. This line-up also recorded the album Pin Ups. After Ronson and Bolder also moved on, Bowie, Garson and Dunbar recorded Diamond Dogs. These latter two albums both still depicted Bowie as the Ziggy Stardust character on the sleeve.

The group joined Bowie's stage persona, Ziggy Stardust, in the theatrical style of the material's presentation. Ronson's guitar and arranging during the Spiders from Mars era not only fitted into this style, but also provided much of the underpinning for later punk rock musicians.

In 1975, Bolder and Woodmansey reformed the band without Ronson, and were joined in this lineup by Mike Garson, Dave Black, and Pete McDonald. Their self-titled album, released in 1976, was their only album before the group disbanded.

The band's name came from the UFO sighting on 27 October 1954, where a stadium crowd thought they had witnessed Martian spacecraft which cast off a thin filament material, later hypothesised to be webs from migrating spiders. The band's name did not come, as sometimes believed by Bowie fans, from the Martian aerographic features often labelled as 'spiders' and 'baby spiders'.

== Band members ==
Primary lineup

- David Bowie – lead vocals, rhythm guitar, keyboards, saxophone, harmonica (1970–1973; died 2016)
- Mick Ronson – lead guitar, backing vocals, keyboards, string arrangements (1970–1973; died 1993)
- Trevor Bolder – bass guitar (1970–1973, 1975–1976; died 2013)
- Mick "Woody" Woodmansey – drums (1970–1973, 1975–1976)

Later Members

- Pete McDonald – lead vocals (1975–1976)
- Dave Black – lead guitar (1975–1976)

Touring musicians

- Nicky Graham – keyboards (1972; died 2024)
- Robin Lumley – keyboards (1972)
- Matthew Fisher – keyboards (1972)
- Mike Garson – keyboards (1972–1973, 1975–1976)
- John Hutchinson – rhythm guitar (1973; died 2021)
- Ken Fordham – saxophone (1973)
- Brian Wilshaw – saxophone, flute (1973)
- Aynsley Dunbar – additional drums (1973)
- Warren Peace – percussion, backing vocals (1973)

== Discography ==
=== Studio albums with David Bowie ===
- Hunky Dory (1971)
- The Rise and Fall of Ziggy Stardust and the Spiders From Mars (1972)
- Aladdin Sane (1973)

=== Studio albums ===
- Spiders From Mars (1976)

=== Live albums ===
- Live Santa Monica '72 (rec. 1972, rel. 2008)
- Ziggy Stardust: The Motion Picture (rec. 1973, rel. 1983)
