= Mick Woodmansey =

English drummer (born 1950)

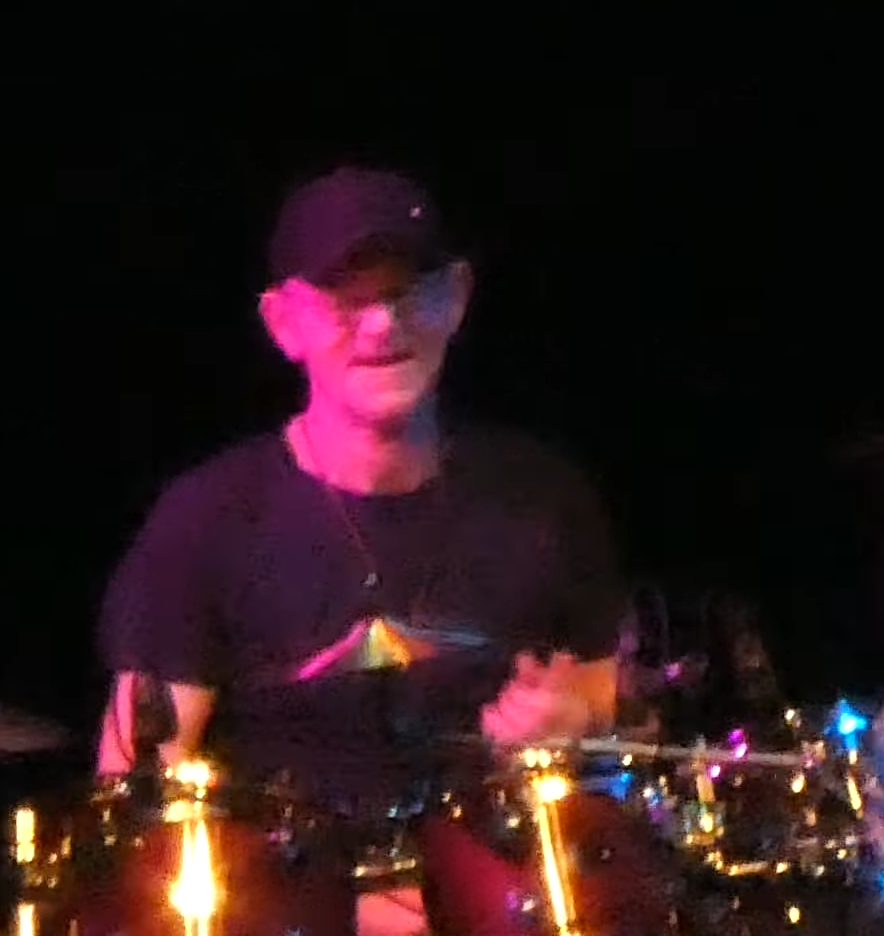
- Woodmansey with Holy Holy 2017

Background information
- Born: 4 February 1950 (age 76); Driffield, East Riding of Yorkshire, England
- Genres: Rock
- Occupation: Drummer
- Formerly of: The Spiders from Mars; Holy Holy
- Website: woodywoodmansey.com

Michael "Woody" Woodmansey (born 4 February 1950) is an English rock drummer best known for his work in the early 1970s as a member of David Bowie's core backing ensemble that became known as the Spiders from Mars in conjunction with the release of Bowie's 1972 LP The Rise and Fall of Ziggy Stardust and the Spiders from Mars. With the death of Bowie in January 2016, Woodmansey became the last surviving member of the Spiders.

In May 1978, he became the drummer of the band Screen Idols, who had success with two albums in the UK.

== Career ==
Woodmansey joined Bowie's backing group Hype at the suggestion of guitarist Mick Ronson in late March 1970, replacing drummer John Cambridge. On his first impression of Bowie, Woodmansey said in 2015: "This guy was living and breathing being a rock & roll star." On Woodmansey, Bowie said in 1994: "He was quite open to direction and in a way sort of carried out what I wanted done much more than most of the other drummers I have worked with." By April, Woodmansey resided at Haddon Hall, Beckenham with Bowie, Ronson and Tony Visconti and recorded Bowie's The Man Who Sold the World album. Visconti was soon replaced by Trevor Bolder, and Woodmansey became a member of the Spiders from Mars backing band with Bolder and Ronson, playing on Bowie's subsequent albums Hunky Dory (1971), The Rise and Fall of Ziggy Stardust and the Spiders from Mars (1972) and Aladdin Sane (1973), and joining him on the accompanying Ziggy Stardust Tour.

Woodmansey was dismissed by Bowie in July 1973 shortly after the tour concluded, attributed to compensation disputes and Bowie's failure to tell the drummer the tour's final date was "the last show that we'll ever do", later understood as the retirement of his Ziggy persona. Woodmansey was replaced by Aynsley Dunbar, who played on Bowie's next album, the 1973 covers album Pin Ups, his final album to have any member of the Spiders until 1993. Woodmansey re-formed the Spiders from Mars for one album, along with Bolder. This necessitated a change of personnel, with Dave Black on lead guitar (because Ronson was unavailable) and Pete McDonald supplying lead vocals. Guest keyboardist was Mike Garson, who had been a major part of Bowie's line-up from the Ziggy Stardust days. Bowie made no contribution to the album, which was titled The Spiders from Mars.

Woodmansey converted to Scientology after being introduced to it by Mike Garson and had his wedding service at a Scientology church in Sussex.

After the final disbandment of the Spiders, he formed his own band, Woody Woodmansey's U-Boat, with Phil Murray, Frankie Marshall, Phil Plant and eventually Martin Smith, releasing a debut album U Boat in 1977. The album was subsequently re-released in 2006 as Woody Woodmansey's U-Boat (Castle Music ESMCD895).

Woodmansey has also played with Art Garfunkel, was a member of the band Cybernauts, and is currently the drummer for 3-D. He also co-led, with Visconti, the supergroup Holy Holy, performing Bowie songs from the 1970s, including the full The Man Who Sold the World album. Woodmansey toured with Holy Holy in September 2014, and followed up with tours of the UK, US and Japan during the following two years. The group has included Erdal Kızılçay, Glenn Gregory, Steve Norman, Marc Almond and James Stevenson. It was announced that Woodmansey would not be participating in the 2022 Holy Holy tour, due to his being unvaccinated with regard to COVID-19. Woodsmansey said he had a "medical exemption" from the vaccine while saying he harboured no "negative feelings" towards the band and a spokesperson for the band issued a statement that "It is incredibly sad that personal beliefs over the vaccine has lead [sic] to the break-up of the original incarnation of the band". He rejoined the band for their 2025 UK tour.

Woodmansey published his autobiography Spider From Mars: My Life With David Bowie in 2016. It was co-written with author Joel McIver and includes a foreword by Visconti.

== Discography ==
=== With David Bowie ===
- The Man Who Sold the World (1970)
- Hunky Dory (1971)
- The Rise and Fall of Ziggy Stardust and the Spiders from Mars (1972)
- Aladdin Sane (1973)
- Ziggy Stardust – The Motion Picture (recorded live 1973, officially released 1983)
- Santa Monica '72 (recorded live 1972, officially released 1994)

=== With Dana Gillespie ===
- Weren't Born a Man (1974)

=== With the Spiders From Mars ===
- The Spiders from Mars (1976)

=== With Woody Woodmansey's U-Boat ===
- Woody Woodmansey's U-Boat (1977)

=== with Screen Idols ===
- Premiere (1979)

=== With Cybernauts ===
- Cybernauts Live (2001)

=== With 3-D ===
- Future Primitive (2008)
