= Ziggy Stardust (character) =

Character created by David Bowie in 1971

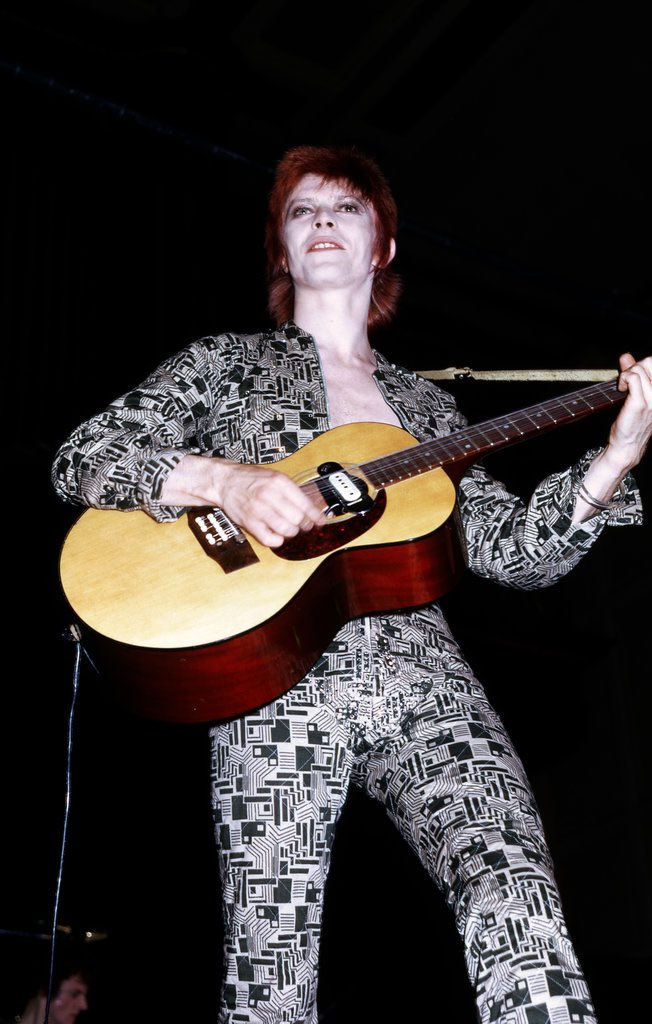
- David Bowie performing as Ziggy Stardust at Newcastle City Hall in 1972
- First appearance: 1972
- Last appearance: October 1973
- Created by: David Bowie
- Portrayed by: David Bowie

In-universe information
- Species: Alien
- Gender: Androgynous
- Occupation: Rock star

Ziggy Stardust is a fictional character created by the English musician David Bowie, and was Bowie's stage persona during 1972 and 1973. The eponymous character of the song "Ziggy Stardust" and its parent album The Rise and Fall of Ziggy Stardust and the Spiders from Mars (1972), Ziggy Stardust was retained for Bowie's subsequent concert tour through the United Kingdom, Japan and North America, during which Bowie performed as the character backed by his band the Spiders from Mars. Bowie continued with a similar character in his next album Aladdin Sane (1973), which he described as "Ziggy goes to America". Bowie retired the character in October 1973 after one final show at The Marquee in London.

As conveyed in the title song and album, Ziggy Stardust is an androgynous, alien rock star who came to Earth before an impending apocalyptic disaster to deliver a message of hope. After accumulating a large following of fans and being worshipped as a messiah, Ziggy eventually dies as a victim of his own fame and excess. The character was meant to symbolise an over-the-top, sexually liberated rock star and serve as a commentary on a society in which celebrities are worshipped. Influences for the character included English singer Vince Taylor, Texan musician the Legendary Stardust Cowboy, and Japanese kabuki theatre.

Ziggy Stardust's exuberant fashion made the character, and Bowie himself, staples in the glam rock repertoire well into the 1970s, defining what the genre would become. The success of the character and its iconic look propelled Bowie into international superstardom. Rolling Stone wrote that Bowie's Ziggy Stardust was "the alter ego that changed music forever and sent his career into orbit".

The Rise and Fall of Ziggy Stardust and the Spiders from Mars has become Bowie's second most popular album in terms of record sales.

== Fictional narrative ==
"'Ziggy' was my Martian messiah who twanged a guitar. He was a simplistic character. I saw him as very simple ... fairly like the character Newton I was to do in the film [The Man Who Fell to Earth] later on. Someone who dropped down here, got brought down to our way of thinking, and ended up destroying his own self. Which is a pretty archetype story line."

— Bowie on the character.

Bowie explained that the character of Ziggy Stardust was conceived as an alien rock star who arrives on an alternate Earth that is dying due to a lack of natural resources. Around the world, older people have lost touch with reality, while children have adopted a hedonistic way of life and no longer want rock music, as there is no electricity to play it. Ziggy is advised in a dream by the infinites ("black-hole jumpers") to write about the coming of a starman who will save the earth. Ziggy's tale of the starman is the first news of hope that the people have heard, so they latch onto it immediately. Ziggy soon gathers a large following and is worshipped as a prophet. According to Bowie, "He takes himself up to incredible spiritual heights and is kept alive by his disciples." The infinites eventually arrive and tear Ziggy apart onstage.

Much of the Ziggy Stardust story is told in the album The Rise and Fall of Ziggy Stardust and the Spiders from Mars, or appears in Bowie's writings as plans for a never-realised theatrical performance of the narrative. Various songs on the album are written from the viewpoints of different characters. On the album, the Ziggy Stardust character is introduced directly on the third track, "Moonage Daydream". However, the song "Ziggy Stardust" is the central piece of the narrative of the album, presenting a complete "birth-to-death chronology" of the character. "Starman" is Ziggy's song prophesying the coming starman who will save the earth. According to author Michael Luckman, the song "Lady Stardust" presents Ziggy meeting his disciples, playing before a crowd of worshippers, followed by "Star", in which he "reveal[s] his plan for intergalactic superstardom". Ziggy is torn apart onstage during the song "Rock 'n' Roll Suicide". The song "Sweet Head", recorded during the Ziggy/Hunky Dory sessions, reference Ziggy directly as well, but the song was left off the album and went unreleased until 1989.

The character was revisited by Bowie in his next album Aladdin Sane (1973), which topped the UK chart, and was his first number-one album. Described by Bowie as "Ziggy goes to America", it contained songs he wrote while travelling to and across the US during the earlier part of the Ziggy Stardust Tour.

== Origins ==
The character was inspired by English rock 'n' roll singer Vince Taylor, whom Bowie met after Taylor had a breakdown and believed himself to be a cross between a god and an alien. Bowie's lyrical allusions to Taylor include identifying Ziggy as a "leper messiah". Taylor was only part of the character's blueprint. In the 1960s Bowie had seen Gene Vincent performing live wearing a leg-brace after a car accident, and observed: "It meant that to crouch at the mike, as was his habit, [Vincent] had to shove his injured leg out behind him to, what I thought, great theatrical effect. This rock stance became position number one for the embryonic Ziggy."

Bowie biographers also propose that Bowie developed the concept of Ziggy as a melding of the persona of Iggy Pop with the music of Lou Reed during a visit to the US in 1971. A girlfriend recalled his "scrawling notes on a cocktail napkin about a crazy rock star named Iggy or Ziggy", and on his return to England he declared his intention to create a character "who looks like he's landed from Mars".

Bowie stated that with Ziggy Stardust, "I wanted to define the archetype messiah rockstar. That's all I wanted to do. I used the trappings of kabuki theatre, mime technique, fringe New York music." One of his primary references was the Velvet Underground. Bowie stated that Ziggy is meant to be an alien of some kind, possibly a Martian, and was based "very much on a Japanese concept". The character's Japanese influences provided a human connection, Bowie explained, as in Britain during the early 1970s Japan "still seemed like an alien society, but it was a human alien society." Bowie also stated that Ziggy Stardust was a product of his career-long ambition to combine rock music and theatre, and that at the time of creating the character he had viewed Ziggy as "a very positive artistic statement ... a grand kitsch painting. The whole guy."

Bowie asserted elsewhere that Ziggy Stardust was born out of a desire to move away from the denim and hippies of the 1960s. Along these lines, some critics assert that Bowie's artificial concoction of a rock star persona was a symbolic critique of the artificiality seen in the rock world of the time. Bowie had previously created artificial stage personas in 1970 with his backing band Hype. Over a small series of shows which, while poorly received at the time, are now credited as the origin of glam rock, the band performed in flamboyant costumes, each with an accompanying persona of a spoof superhero. Bowie, dressed in a blue cape, lurex tights, thigh boots and a leotard with colourful scarves sewn onto his shirt, was "Rainbowman". Describing his costume as "very spacey", he later explained that his idea for the outfits was to counter the popular image of rock acts at the time, which was "all jeans and long hair". The concept behind Rainbowman was recycled and reinvented as Ziggy Stardust.

=== Name ===
Bowie told Rolling Stone that the name "Ziggy" was "one of the few Christian names [he] could find beginning with the letter 'Z'". He later explained in a 1990 interview for Q magazine that the Ziggy part came from a tailor's shop called Ziggy's that he passed on a train, and he liked it because it had "that Iggy [Pop] connotation but it was a tailor's shop, and I thought, Well, this whole thing is gonna be about clothes, so it was my own little joke calling him Ziggy. So Ziggy Stardust was a real compilation of things." "Stardust" came from the Legendary Stardust Cowboy, the stage name of singer Norman Carl Odam, whose music intrigued Bowie.

== Appearance ==
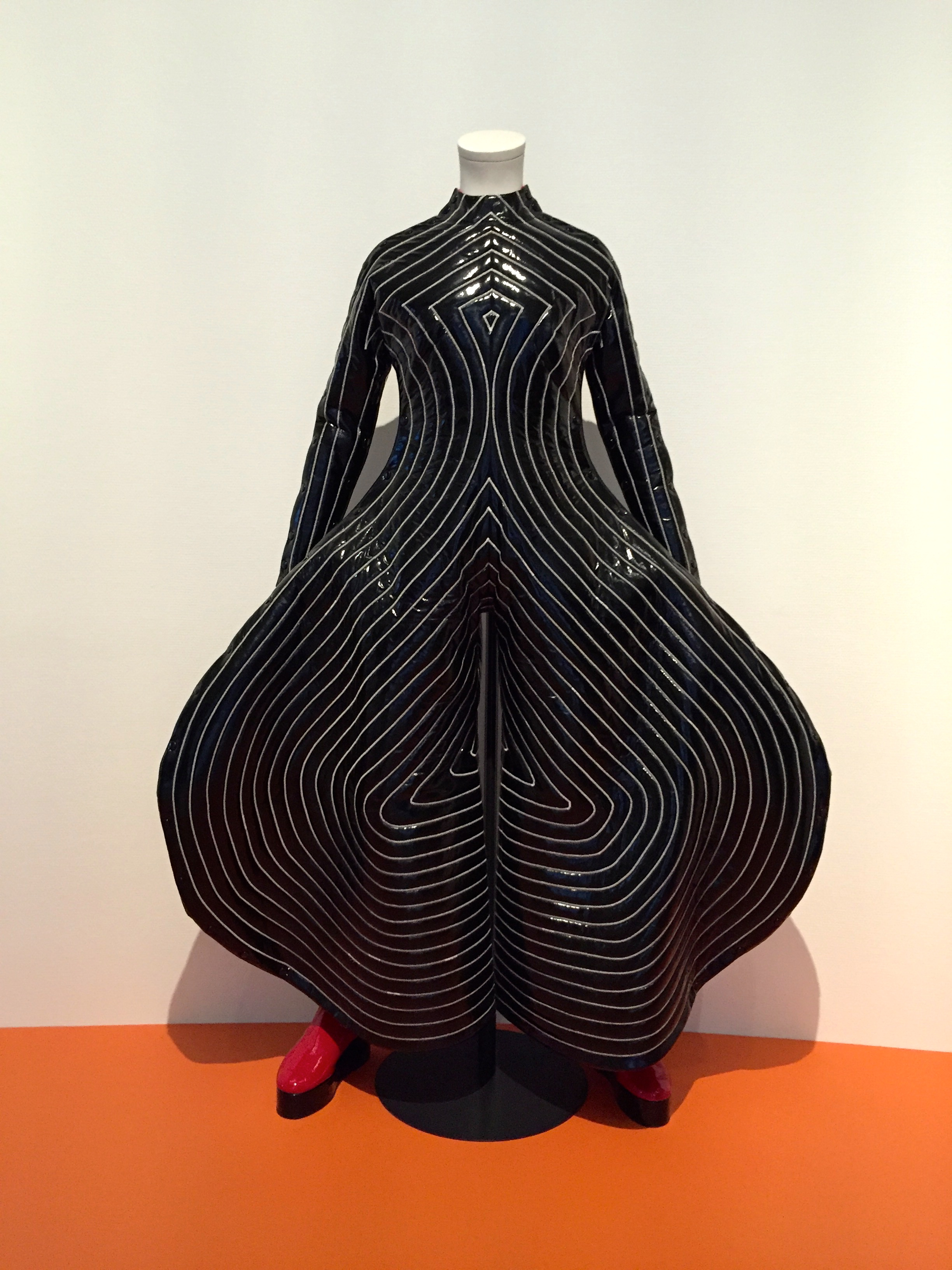
A sequinned jumpsuit, one of the costumes designed by Kansai Yamamoto for Ziggy Stardust

=== Hair ===
As Ziggy Stardust, Bowie had a bright red mullet. The hairstyle was inspired by that of a model for Japanese designer Kansai Yamamoto that Bowie had seen in Honey magazine, and modelled on three different images from Vogue—a French issue inspired the front of the haircut, while the sides and back came from two different German copies. Bowie's mullet was cut and dyed by hairdresser Suzi Fussey, who accompanied the Ziggy Stardust tour until 1973. Fussey initially cut Bowie's hair in the style in January 1972, and after experimenting with colour treatments on samples of Bowie's hair, dyed it a flaming red colour; Bowie recalled the dye colour was "Schwartzkopf red". The dye contained 30 volume peroxide which gave Bowie's hair some lift, but Fussey then used an anti-dandruff treatment called Gard to help stiffen it and make it stand upright. The haircut achieved widespread mainstream success popularly, as Bowie himself stated in 1993, "[The Ziggy cut] became to hairdressing in the early seventies, what the Lady Di cut was for the early eighties. Only with double the appeal, because it worked for both sexes."

=== Clothing ===
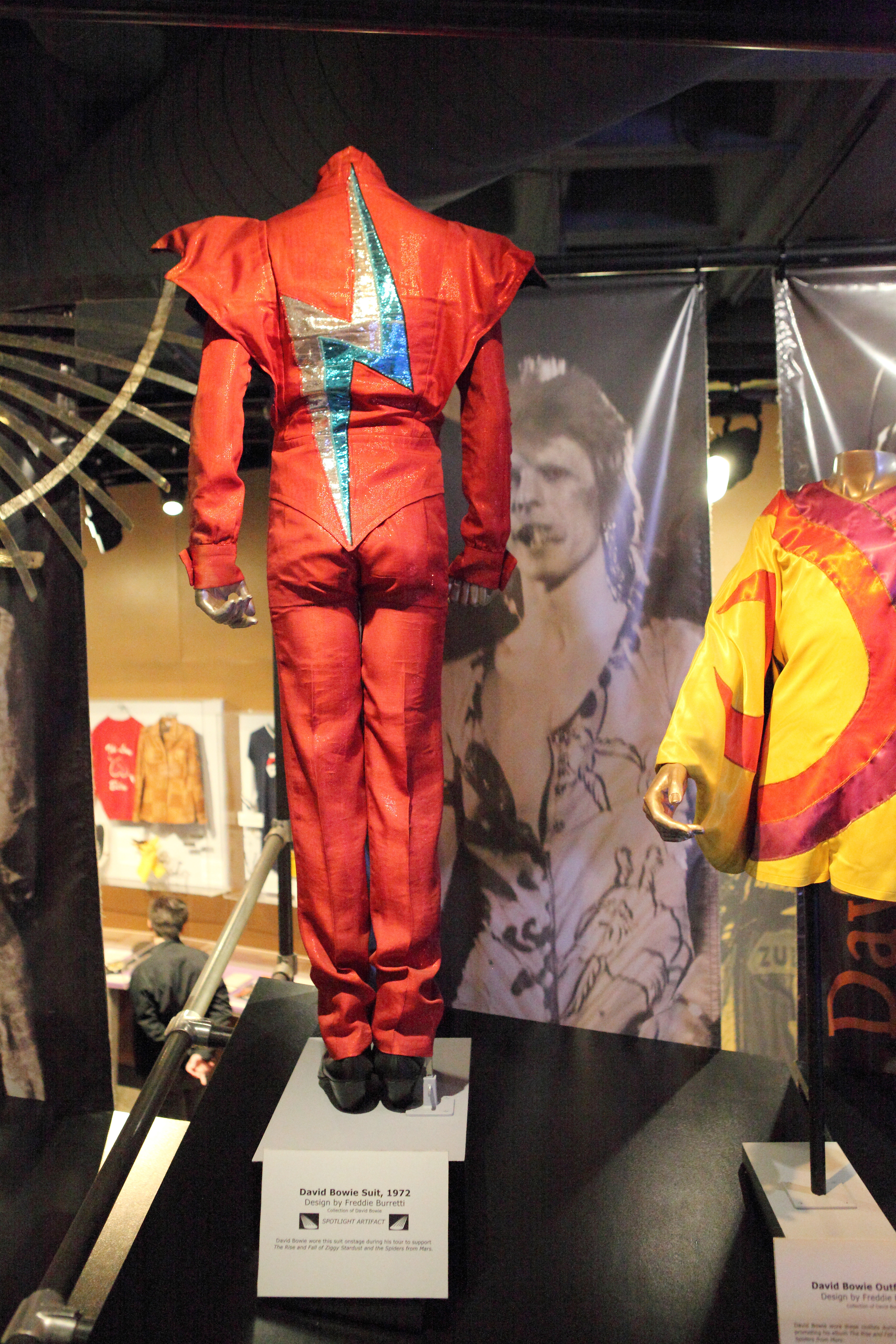
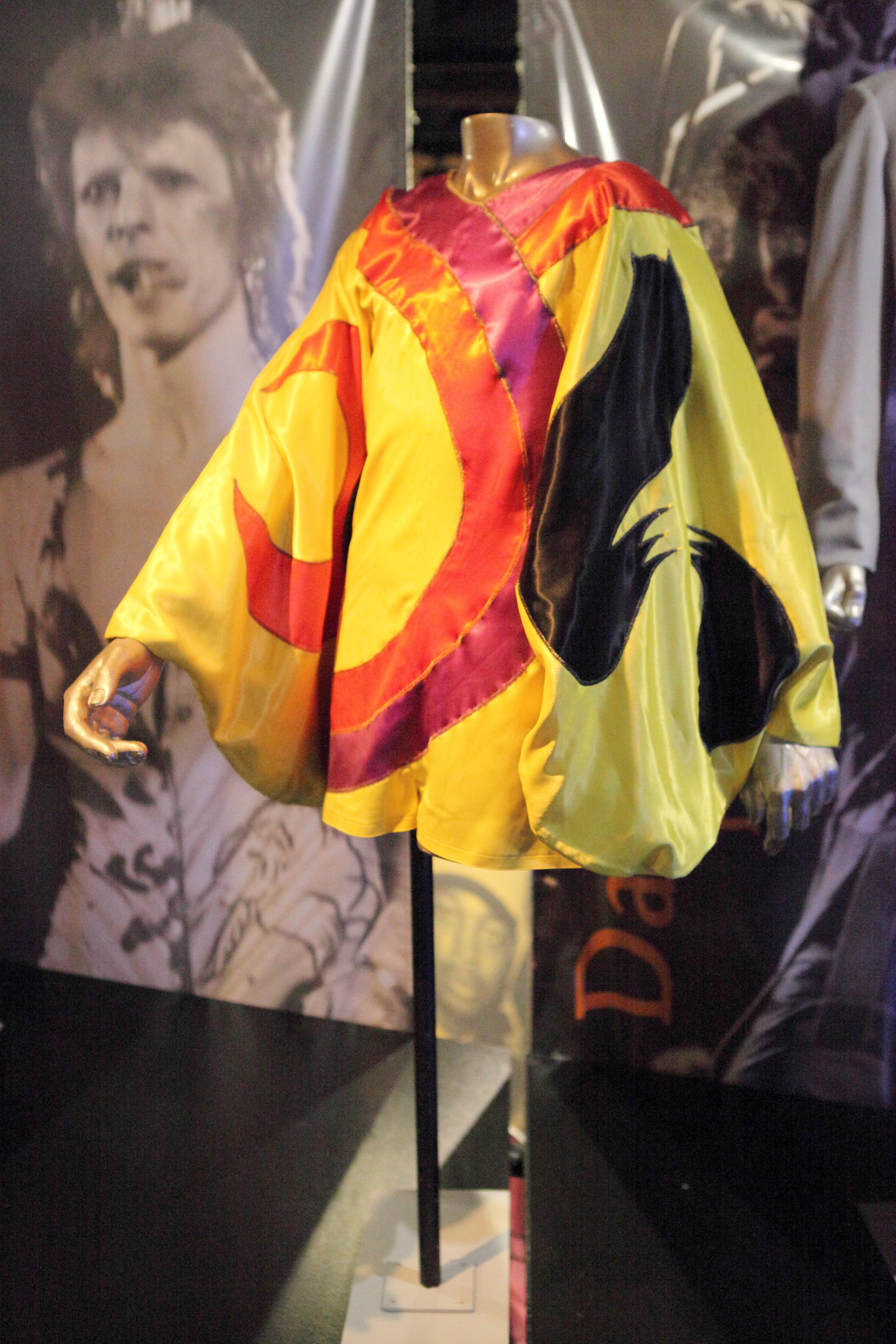
Stage outfits for Ziggy Stardust designed by Freddie Burretti in 1972

Long and slender, Ziggy was dressed in glamorous outfits, often with flared legs and shoulders, and an open chest.

On the cover of The Rise and Fall of Ziggy Stardust and the Spiders from Mars, Bowie appeared in a green suit of his own design, made by his tailor friend Freddie Burretti and seamstress Sue Frost. Produced in a geometric-patterned fabric, representing an integrated circuit, the bomber jacket and matching cuffed trousers were worn with knee-high, lace-up boots designed by Stan Miller. Similar outfits were made for Bowie's backing band the Spiders From Mars; these costumes, worn in early live performances, were based on those sported by the Droogs in Stanley Kubrick's 1971 film A Clockwork Orange. Bowie explained, "I wanted to take the hardness and violence of those Clockwork Orange outfits—the trousers tucked into big boots and the codpiece things—and soften them up by using the most ridiculous fabrics. It was a Dada thing—this extreme ultraviolence in Liberty fabrics." In addition to his green suit, Bowie's costumes for early concerts were white satin trousers with a flock-patterned jacket, and a multi-coloured jumpsuit that he also wore on Top of the Pops.

By August 1972, Bowie was introducing Kansai Yamamoto's designs as stage wear for the Ziggy character, lent to him by Yamamoto's stylist friend, Yasuko Hayashi. Bowie commissioned Yamamoto to design his 1973 U.K. tour costuming, and subsequently the U.S. tour costuming for the Aladdin Sane shows. In total, seven costumes were designed for Ziggy Stardust by Yamamoto. The collection he provided Bowie in April 1973 included a white robe with "David Bowie" written in Japanese, a silver leotard hung with a floor-length fringe of glass beads, a striped spandex bodystocking, and a multi-coloured kimono that could be torn away to reveal a red loincloth. Many of Yamamoto's stage wear designs for Bowie were "tear-away" outfits, influenced by hikinuki, the method of changing costumes quickly in kabuki theatre.

=== Makeup ===
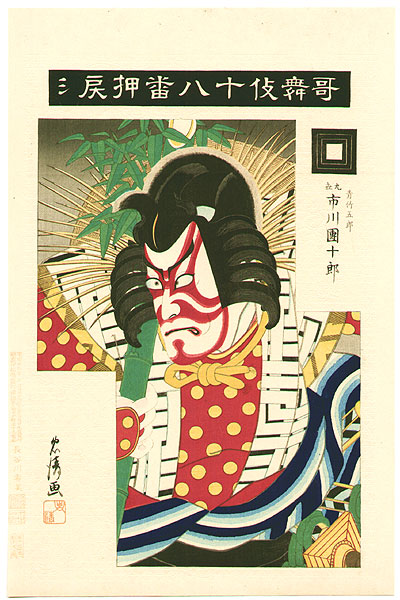
Ziggy's makeup was partly inspired by techniques taught by kabuki actor Bandō Tamasaburō V (pictured: an example of kabuki makeup).

The character had pale skin, described by Bowie as a "snow-white tan". Following the instruction Yamamoto gave to his models, Bowie shaved off his eyebrows in late 1972, adding to Ziggy's alien visage. On Ziggy's forehead was a gold "astral sphere" suggested by make-up artist Pierre La Roche (who also applied the lightning flash to Bowie's face for the cover of Aladdin Sane). When the Ziggy Stardust tour came to Japan in April 1973, Bowie met the kabuki theatre star Bandō Tamasaburō V, who taught him about traditional Japanese makeup techniques. In a 1973 Mirabelle magazine article, La Roche explained that Bowie bought most of his make-up from a shop in Rome but acquired his "white rice powder" from "Tokyo's Woolworth's equivalent". Bowie used a "German gold base in cake form" for the sphere, and would occasionally "outline that gold circle with tiny gold rhinestones, stuck on with eyelash glue".

By the end of the Ziggy Stardust period in 1973, Bowie would spend at least two hours before each concert to have his makeup done. According to La Roche, for his last few English concerts, Bowie painted tiny lightning streaks on his cheek and upper leg.

== Cultural impact ==
"I wasn't at all surprised 'Ziggy Stardust' made my career. I packaged a totally credible plastic rock star."

— David Bowie, in an interview with Rolling Stone

By the time Bowie returned to Britain for the final leg of the Ziggy Stardust tour in May 1973 following the release of Aladdin Sane, he had become the biggest English rock star since the Beatles almost a decade earlier, in terms of concert and record sales. Crowd reactions to Bowie during the Ziggy Stardust period have been likened to Beatlemania, and the character's stardom as the height of his popularity dubbed "Ziggymania". Rolling Stone described Ziggy Stardust as "the ultimate rock star": "He's a wild, hedonistic figure ... but at his core communicates peace and love".

Influencing the glam rock genre and fashion wave, Bowie as Ziggy Stardust became one of the most iconic images of rock history and pop culture. The Washington Post wrote, "He was not only glam's principal architect, he was its most beautiful specimen." Ziggy Stardust helped to popularise the mullet in the 1970s, though the hairstyle was still without a name at the time. The "Ziggy" cut marked an "era-defining grooming change" as it went against the typical fashion of natural, long haircuts for men at the time and was also suited to either sex. GQ wrote that the "Ziggy" cut "remains one of the boldest and most stylish haircuts in history, from the way it spiked up on top and swooped down to a sort of mullet – but way cooler than a mullet – finish."

OMD frontman Andy McCluskey said of the character's impact on the UK public, "We'd seen glam, but British glam – Slade and the Sweet – were like builders in sequins. And there was Bowie looking like this androgynous lizard thing, that was a real wow factor."

== Retirement ==
By July 1973, Bowie had been touring as Ziggy for 18 months. Due to the intense nature of his touring life, Bowie felt as though maintaining the Ziggy persona was affecting his own personality and sanity too much; acting the same role over an extended period, it became difficult for him to separate Ziggy Stardust from his own character offstage. (Note: Bowie: "It was quite easy to become obsessed night and day with the character. I became Ziggy Stardust. David Bowie went totally out the window. Everybody was convincing me that I was a messiah ... I got hopelessly lost in the fantasy." "My whole personality was affected ... I thought I might as well take Ziggy to interviews as well. Why leave him on stage? Looking back it was very absurd. It became very dangerous. I really did have doubts about my sanity.") Bowie was also beginning to reach a point of creative boredom and felt that he could no longer perform Ziggy with the same enthusiasm. (Note: Bowie: "I had an awful lot of fun doing [Ziggy] ... but my performance on stage reached a peak. I felt I couldn't go on stage in the same context again ... if I'm tired with what I'm doing wouldn't it be long before the audience realised.") There were also practical reasons behind his decision to retire the character: Bowie's record company RCA refused to finance a third large US tour due to Bowie's management overspending in excess of $300,000 during the 1972 and 1973 tours, as well as disappointing record sales in the US.

Bowie retired Ziggy Stardust during a live concert on 3 July 1973, at London's Hammersmith Odeon in front of 3,500 fans. The concert featured an 18-song set, with Jeff Beck joining the band for a medley of "The Jean Genie" and The Beatles' "Love Me Do". Just before the final song of the concert, "Rock 'n' Roll Suicide", Bowie announced, "Of all the shows on this tour, this particular show will remain with us the longest, because not only is it the last show of the tour, but it's the last show that we'll ever do." The fans and press took this to mean that Bowie was retiring entirely, causing much media attention. However, it only referred to the Ziggy Stardust persona and the Spiders from Mars backing band.

The final Ziggy concert was filmed by D. A. Pennebaker and released in 1979 as the documentary Ziggy Stardust and the Spiders from Mars and the audio on the live album Ziggy Stardust: The Motion Picture (released in 1983).

== Legacy ==
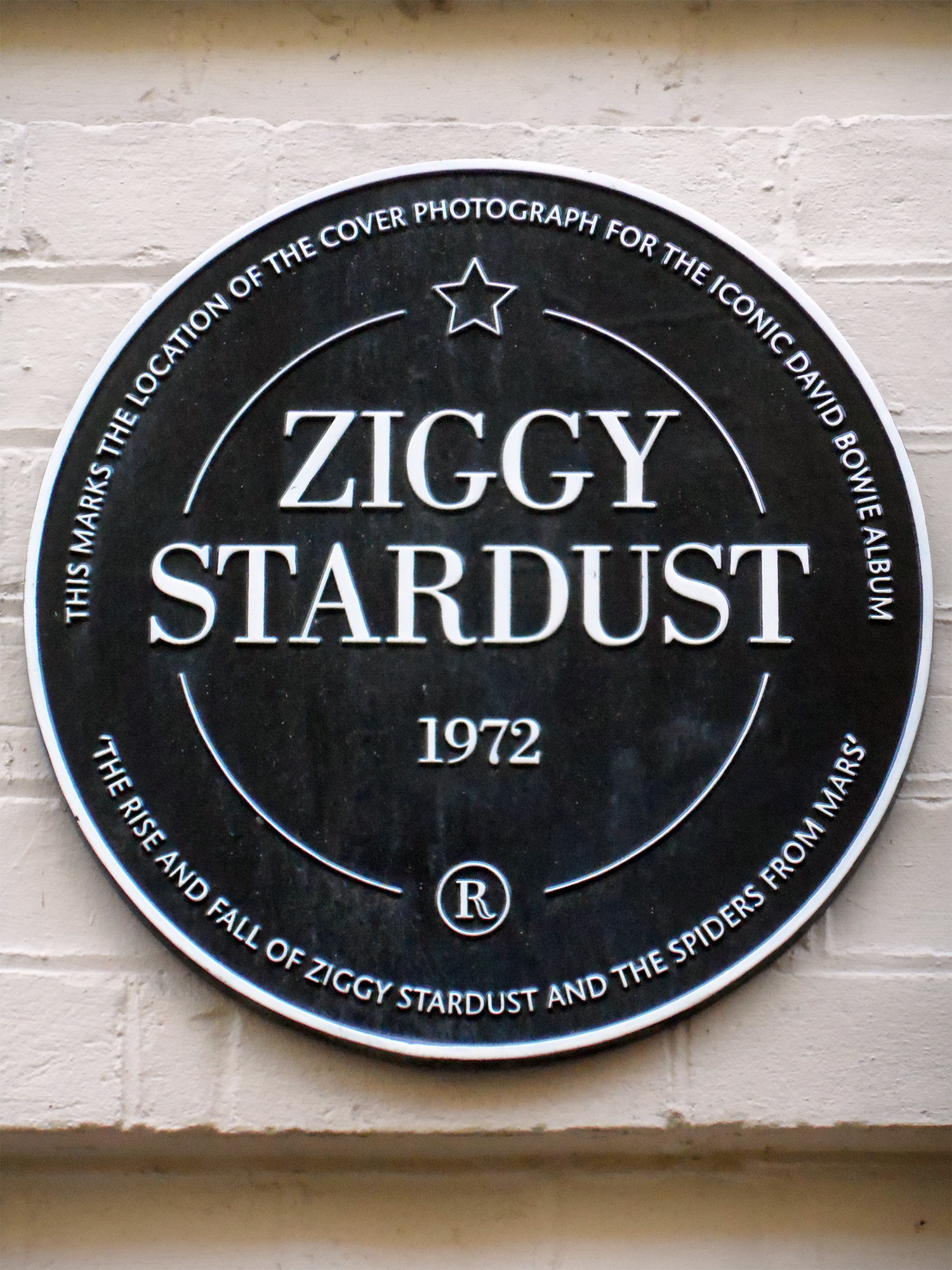
The plaque on Heddon Street marking Bowie's album cover shoot

Ziggy Stardust is widely considered Bowie's greatest creation.

In 2012, a plaque was unveiled by the Crown Estate at the site at which the iconic Ziggy Stardust album cover photograph was taken by Brian Ward on Heddon Street, London. The unveiling was attended by original Spiders from Mars band members Woody Woodmansey and Trevor Bolder, and was unveiled by Gary Kemp. The plaque was the first to be installed by the Crown Estate and is one of the few plaques in the country devoted to fictional characters. In 2018, a statue depicting a mature Bowie looking at his younger self as Ziggy Stardust was unveiled in Aylesbury, the town where Bowie debuted the character in 1972. The statue stands in Aylesbury's Market Square, which Bowie referenced in "Five Years", the opening song of The Rise and Fall of Ziggy Stardust and The Spiders from Mars album.

In 2015, the African butterfly species Bicyclus sigiussidorum was named after the character due to its "glammy" appearance. (Sigiussidorum is a Latin rendering of "Ziggy Stardust".)

== In popular culture ==
=== Music ===
- The 1978 cyberpunk rock opera Starmania features a character called Ziggy.
- The British rock band Def Leppard referenced the character in their song "Rocket" from their 1987 album Hysteria.
- The Swedish band Gyllene Tider recorded a song called "Åh Ziggy Stardust (var blev du av?)" ("Ah Ziggy Stardust, what became of you?"), included on the 1990 re-release of their album Gyllene Tider.
- Ziggy Stardust was one of several pop icons Marc Almond dressed up as in the video for his 1995 single "Adored and Explored" and the cover of its follow-up single, "The Idol".
- The Omēga character, featured on the cover of Marilyn Manson's 1998 album Mechanical Animals was based on Ziggy Stardust, aesthetically and story-wise.
- A cartoon version of Ziggy featured in the video for Boy George's 2008 single "Yes We Can".
- Matt Sorum referred to the character in the song "What Ziggy Says" on his 2014 album Stratosphere.
- Bauhaus covered the song Ziggy Stardust on their 1982 album The Sky's Gone Out.

=== Film and television ===
- Fictional pop star Brian Slade and his space-age alter ego Maxwell Demon in the 1998 film Velvet Goldmine were based on Bowie in his Ziggy Stardust period. However, Bowie would dissociate himself from the film.
- In the 1999 comedy special Golden Years, Ricky Gervais plays a Bowie impersonator named Clive Meadows who arrives at a business meeting as Ziggy Stardust.
- In the sixth episode of the 2007 sitcom Flight of the Conchords, the character Brett (Bret McKenzie) is visited by a dream version of Ziggy Stardust, among several other of Bowie's personas.
- The character of "Ziggy Stardust" in full costume appears in Zack Snyder's Watchmen.
- "Artie" (played by John McCrea) in the 2021 film Cruella was inspired by the character.
- In season 2 episode 4 of Big Little Lies, the character of Ziggy dresses up as Ziggy Stardust. Ziggy Stardust is also mentioned by name in the season 1 premiere.

== See also ==
- Major Tom
- The Thin White Duke
