= Velvet Goldmine (song) =

- Cover to the 1975 maxi-single, with "Velvet Goldmine" as the second track on side B

Song by David Bowie
- Released: 26 September 1975
- Recorded: 11 November 1971
- Studio: Trident, London
- Genre: Glam rock
- Length: 3:14
- Label: RCA
- Songwriter: David Bowie
- Producers: David Bowie; Ken Scott

"Velvet Goldmine" is a song by the English singer-songwriter David Bowie. A glam rock song with lyrical references to oral sex, it was originally recorded on 11 November 1971 at Trident Studios in London during the sessions for his 1972 album The Rise and Fall of Ziggy Stardust and the Spiders from Mars. It was ultimately left off the album and subsequently released (along with "Changes") as a B-side of the UK re-release of "Space Oddity" in 1975. The song has been praised by Bowie's biographers as an undervalued classic. It later appeared on compilation albums, including on Re:Call 1, part of the Five Years (1969–1973) boxed set, in 2015, and the Rock 'n' Roll Star! box set in 2024. Its namesake was used for Todd Haynes's 1998 film of the same name.

== Overview ==
David Bowie recorded "Velvet Goldmine", originally titled "He's a Goldmine", at Trident Studios in London during the sessions for his 1972 album The Rise and Fall of Ziggy Stardust and the Spiders from Mars on 11 November 1971, the same day as "Star", "Hang On to Yourself", "Sweet Head", "Looking For a Friend" and "Ziggy Stardust". Co-produced by Bowie and Ken Scott, it featured contributions from his backing band the Spiders from Mars—guitarist Mick Ronson, bassist Trevor Bolder and drummer Woody Woodmansey. Slated for release on the album's second side as late as 15 December before it was replaced in early 1972, Bowie stating in a radio interview that it was "probably a little provocative".

Musically, "Velvet Goldmine" is a glam rock song that contains a bouncy piano part and backing vocals similar to Hunky Dory (1971), while also anticipating the cabaret feel Bowie soon experimented with on Aladdin Sane. The author Peter Doggett described it as a combination of Gene Vincent's 1950s rock 'n' roll and the "electric thrust" of Marc Bolan. Lyrically, the same exhibits similar themes to "Sweet Head"; in Doggett's words, a "teen sex fantasy oozing with references to oral sex". Its title is in part a reference to the Velvet Underground. Discussing its composition, the biographer Chris O'Leary highlights its "salacious" lyric ("I'll be your king volcano" and "heal ya head with my own"), the "eerie" D minor refrain and the almost spoken word backing vocals. He and AllMusic's Ned Raggett also commend Ronson's guitar solo, which was accomplished via a phaser.

The song remained unreleased until 1975 when RCA Records included it—with 1971's "Changes"—as part of the "Space Oddity" maxi-single, using a new mix without Bowie's consultation. He was furious, later commenting: "The whole thing came out without my having the chance to listen to the mix. Somebody else had mixed it—an extraordinary move." Nevertheless, the maxi-single became Bowie's first UK number-one single. In later decades, the song has been praised by Nicholas Pegg and O'Leary as "superb and undervalued" and "a lost Bowie classic", respectively.

== Later releases ==
The song was included on the 1982 RCA compilation Rare, where it was accompanied by a set of inaccurate lyrics. Eight years later in 1990, the song appeared as a bonus track on Rykodisc's CD reissue of Ziggy Stardust. It subsequently appeared on The Best of David Bowie 1969/1974 in 1997, the Ziggy Stardust 30th Anniversary reissue bonus disc in 2002, on Re:Call 1, part of the Five Years (1969–1973) boxed set, in 2015, and the Rock 'n' Roll Star! box set in 2024.

The song's namesake was also used for filmmaker Todd Haynes's 1998 film of the same name, a film that features numerous allusions to Bowie's career. The band King Volcano also took their name from the song.

== Personnel ==
According to Chris O'Leary:

- David Bowie – lead and backing vocals, 12-string acoustic guitar
- Mick Ronson – electric guitar, piano, backing vocals
- Trevor Bolder – bass guitar
- Mick Woodmansey – drums

Technical

- David Bowie – producer
- Ken Scott – producer, engineer
- Dennis MacKay – engineer
