= The Better Beatles =

Post-punk band from Nebraska

- Origin: Omaha, Nebraska, U.S.
- Genres: New wave; post-punk
- Years active: 1981
- Labels: Woodgrain Records, Hook or Crook Records
- Past members: Jean pSmith; Kurt Magnuson; Jay Rosen; Dave Nordin
- Website: betterbeatles.com

The Better Beatles was a short-lived post-punk band formed in Omaha, Nebraska, in 1981. The group consisted of Kurt Magnuson on bass, Dave Nordin on synthesizer, Jean pSmith on vocals, and Jay Rosen on drums and vocals. Their repertoire consisted entirely of cold, minimalist covers of the songs of The Beatles in a manner stylistically comparable to covers performed by The Residents.

Nordin has stated that he considered the Beatles "an oppressive influence", and pSmith has said their goal was to "[strip] the songs of their sacred status". After a handful of shows, they recorded an album's worth of material in late 1981. They broke up shortly before their debut single "Penny Lane"/"I'm Down" was released on Woodgrain Records, leaving the bulk of their music unreleased.

The single received some play from John Peel in the UK and the band was mentioned in The Village Voice by critic Robert Christgau as a candidate for the Best Name Award in the annual Pazz & Jop Critics Poll. There was some interest from labels, but the members had already moved on, with pSmith and Magnuson having relocated to Seattle. Attention died down and the band was largely forgotten for over two decades. Rosen went on to perform as a guitarist with the Altamont Boys, the backing band for The Legendary Stardust Cowboy. Due to a growing cult interest online, pSmith tracked down Rosen and the two of them compiled the "Penny Lane" single and the remaining recorded material into an album, Mercy Beat, which was released in 2007. The cultural organization Hear Nebraska has described the album as "some of the definitive Nebraska recordings of the punk-rock era."

== Discography ==
- "Penny Lane"/"I'm Down" (1982)
- Mercy Beat (2007)
