= Legendary Stardust Cowboy =

US musician; pioneered psychobilly genre (born 1947)

- Born: Norman Carl Odam; September 5, 1947 (age 79); Lubbock, Texas, U.S.
- Origin: United States
- Genres: Psychobilly; rockabilly; outsider music; country rock; surf rock
- Instruments: Vocals; guitar; bugle
- Years active: 1968–present
- Labels: Psycho-Suave; Mercury

Norman Carl Odam (born September 5, 1947, in Lubbock, Texas), known professionally as the Legendary Stardust Cowboy, is an outsider performer who is considered one of the pioneers of the genre that came to be known as psychobilly in the 1960s.

== Early life ==
Odam was interested in space travel from early childhood, recalling that at kindergarten age he "used to look at the moon and [tell himself] that some day man will go to the moon." As a teenager he combined his interests in outer space and the American west to create the name "Stardust Cowboy", adding the word "legendary" because "I am a legend in my own time." The fact that the initials of "Legendary Star Dust", LSD, referred to a popular drug at the time was coincidental; he claims to have adopted the name in 1961, before the drug was popularized.

Odam took up music in his high school years as a means toward popularity and impressing girls. Inspired by Chet Atkins, he learned guitar and also taught himself to play the bugle. After high school he briefly attended college, majoring in electronics.

== "Paralyzed" ==
While in college Odam had the idea of "writing a wild song that would captivate everybody." This led to his writing of a song, "Paralyzed", which he performed at local talent contests. He recorded "Paralyzed" in 1968 in what was apparently a moment of spare time in a recording studio in Fort Worth, Texas. He played dobro and bugle, while T-Bone Burnett played drums. The track features unintelligible snarls, growls, and similar vocalisms, surrounded by frantic strumming on acoustic guitar, Burnett's equally frantic drumming, and occasional slurred yelps of the song's title, "Paralyzed!" The words that are uttered change with each performance, and are occasionally somewhat intelligible; the song's main storyline centers on Odam's unrequited love for a real-life "beautiful cheerleader from Lubbock."

Five hundred copies of the single were initially pressed and were released on Odam's own Psycho-Suave label. The song gained some regional popularity and was picked up by a major label, Mercury Records. The song's popularity earned "the Ledge" (as he is known by fans) an appearance on NBC's Rowan and Martin's Laugh-in comedy television series, season 2, episode 10. He dressed in his trademark buckskin jacket, boots and spurs, and ten-gallon hat and, presumably backed by T-Bone Burnett on drums, performed "Paralyzed" and its B-side, "Who’s Knocking On My Door". During the latter song the entire Laugh-In cast joined him on stage and began cavorting and clowning around. The Ledge, in his words, "got mad and ran off the set. That wasn't part of the act." The song also made an appearance on The Tonight Show Starring Jimmy Fallon during the show's 'Do Not Play' sketch.

In 1973, NASA used the song to wake up the crews of Skylab 3 and 4. The crew was allegedly so distracted from the shock of the song (with Owen Garriott likening it to "...Marines doing close-order drill") that NASA forbade the use of the song for that purpose ever again.

In the 1994 book The New Book of Rock Lists, writers Dave Marsh and James Bernard name "Paralyzed" the "Worst Song Issued by a Major Label". They write that the Legendary Stardust Cowboy was "a one-man band incapable of playing any instrument, singing in tune, or keeping in time even with himself," but note that "certain outlaw country fans consider 'Paralyzed' a camp classic." Conversely, critic Toby Creswell includes the song in his book 1001 Songs: The Great Songs of All Time and the Artists, Stories and Secrets Behind Them (2005). In 1976, "Paralyzed" ranked 15th in the first ever Festive Fifty, a top 50 list documenting the favourite songs of listeners of John Peel's radio show. Classical pianist Paul Lewis considers the song his guilty pleasure.

== Later career ==
Odam was invited to appear on other programs but these were canceled because of a musicians' strike that halted live television performances. By the time the strike was over, his 15 minutes of fame had lapsed. Historian Rob Weiner of Texas Tech University considers Odam's musical career "a product of desperation," a result of the adage that "there is nothing to do in Lubbock". "Paralyzed" went on to be featured on several Doctor Demento compilations, and it often appears prominently in lists of the worst recordings ever made.

Odam has continued recording intermittently since "Paralyzed" and released several albums and singles. "I Took a Trip on a Gemini Spaceship"—an LSD-tinged satire of "I Thought About You"—was covered by longtime fan David Bowie on his Heathen album. Odam, who was largely oblivious to Bowie's fandom of his work, returned the compliment by recording his version of "Space Oddity". Bowie himself said that the term "stardust" in "Ziggy Stardust" is taken from The Legendary Stardust Cowboy. On a live online chatroom in his own Internet service provider, BowieNet, Bowie was asked where he had discovered the Legendary Stardust Cowboy, to which he replied: "When I first joined Mercury Records in the late 60s, he was one of the only other artists they had. And they gave me his entire catalogue, which at the time was three singles. I immediately fell in love with his music. Well actually, the IDEA of his music. As the music itself wasn't too recognizable as being such." Bowie has often mentioned his love for Odam's music.

A documentary of Odam's career, entitled Cotton Pickin’ Smash! The Story of the Legendary Stardust Cowboy, was prepared during the late 1980s. It remains unreleased commercially but is occasionally viewed non-commercially.

Odam currently resides in San Jose, California. In keeping with his passion for space, he has worked for a private contractor that works with NASA and still performs regularly. Since the late 1990s, Odam has played with a backing band called the Altamont Boys, which includes bassist Klaus Flouride (of Dead Kennedys), guitarist Jay Rosen (of The Better Beatles), and drummer Joey Meyers. In May 2007, he played at the David Bowie High-Line festival in New York City at Bowie's invitation. Weiner said that Odam has never returned to perform in Lubbock, having believed that his hometown, where he first gained experience by playing in parking lots to draw an audience, offered him little encouragement.

College radio station KMSU in Mankato, Minnesota flew the Legendary Stardust Cowboy and his band to Mankato in May 2010 for a show, at which the mayor declared, officially, that May 21 is "Legendary Stardust Cowboy Day" in Mankato. Mankato has emerged as a "Mecca" for Legendary Stardust Cowboy fans, perhaps second only to San Francisco, California.

In 2010, Odam played himself in the independent film Rainbows End, a mockumentary about a band traveling from Texas to California to record an album with him.

In late 2011, The Legendary Stardust Cowboy released an anthology of his life's work, a double CD on Cherry Red Records from England, titled For Sarah, Raquel, and David: An Anthology. The names refer to Sarah Ferguson, Duchess of York; Raquel Welch, actress; and performing artist David Bowie, all longtime fans of The Ledge's work.

In 2020, Jeff Feuerzeig began work on a documentary on Odam's life, which will feature interviews with Odam interspersed with animations based on interviews of people close to him. It is being developed in the vein of Feuerzeig's previous film The Devil and Daniel Johnston. No release date was set as of October 2020, as production had been delayed due to the COVID-19 pandemic.

== Discography ==
=== Singles ===
- 1968: "Paralyzed"/"Who's Knocking on My Door", Psycho-Suave; Mercury
- 1968: "I Took a Trip (On a Gemini Spaceship)"/"Down in the Wrecking Yard", Mercury
- 1968: "Kiss and Run"/"Everything's Gettin' Bigger But Our Love", Mercury
- 1989: "Standing in a Trashcan"/"My Underwear Froze to the Clothesline", Spider
- 1991: "Relaxation"/"I Ride a Tractor", Norton
- 1992: "I Hate CDs"/"Linda", Norton
- 2005: "Hot Tub Teddy", Classic Bar Music split With The Altamont Boys / The Western Dark
- 2017: "'Twas the Night Before Christmas (flexi disc with Christmas card)", Vollmond Flexis

=== EP ===
- 1969: Donna Plus Apollo, Crazed Bop Records

=== Albums ===
- Rock-It to Stardom (1984), Luna/Amazing
- Retro Rocket Back to Earth (1986), Spider/New Rose
- The Legendary Stardust Cowboy Rides Again (1989), New Rose
- Retro Rocket Back to Earth / Rides Again (1991, two albums combined on one CD), New Rose
- Live in Chicago (1998), Pravda
- Tokyo / The Legendary Stardust Cowboy and The Altamont Boys (2003), Cracked Piston Records
- Paralyzed! His Vintage Recordings 1968-81 (2006), EM Records
- For Sarah, Raquel, and David, An Anthology (2011), (2-CD) Cherry Red Records
- Oh What a Strange Trip It’s Been on a Gemini Spaceship (2016), Impetus Records
