= Sweet Head =

Song by David Bowie

from the album The Rise and Fall of Ziggy Stardust and the Spiders from Mars (reissue)
- Released: 1990
- Recorded: 11 November 1971
- Studio: Trident, London
- Genre: Glam rock, hard rock
- Length: 4:14
- Label: Rykodisc
- Songwriter: David Bowie
- Producers: David Bowie, Ken Scott

"Sweet Head" is a song written by David Bowie which was recorded at Trident Studios on 11 November 1971. It took 18 years before it was eventually released and it first appeared on the Rykodisc CD release of Ziggy Stardust in 1990. Its release came as a complete surprise to even the most die-hard Bowie fans and collectors who were totally unaware of the track prior to its issue. Even co-producer Ken Scott had forgotten about its existence and admitted his utter surprise upon its release.

It then appeared on the 30th Anniversary Reissue bonus disc of Ziggy Stardust in 2002 and again in 2012 for the 40th Anniversary (this time with a jokey 30 second studio discussion between Bowie and the band). Though originally written for The Rise and Fall of Ziggy Stardust and The Spiders of Mars (the lyrics refer to "brother Ziggy"), it was considered too provocative to be released on the original album by the A&R team at RCA.

The song's lyrics contain references to the then recently released film A Clockwork Orange as well as strong innuendo, racist name-calling and directly references oral sex. "It was about oral sex, and it was one I don't think RCA particularly wanted," Bowie told Musician in 1990.

Similar in tempo to the other discarded song recorded in the same session (Chuck Berry's "Around and Around"), "Sweet Head" features lead guitar by Mick Ronson, while Bowie plays his customary twelve string acoustic guitar. There are 5 takes of the song which were all recorded live in the studio - the issued song being Take 4.

== Personnel ==
- David Bowie – lead vocals, acoustic guitar
- Mick Ronson – electric guitar
- Trevor Bolder – bass guitar
- Mick Woodmansey – drums
