= List of UK top-ten singles in 1972 =

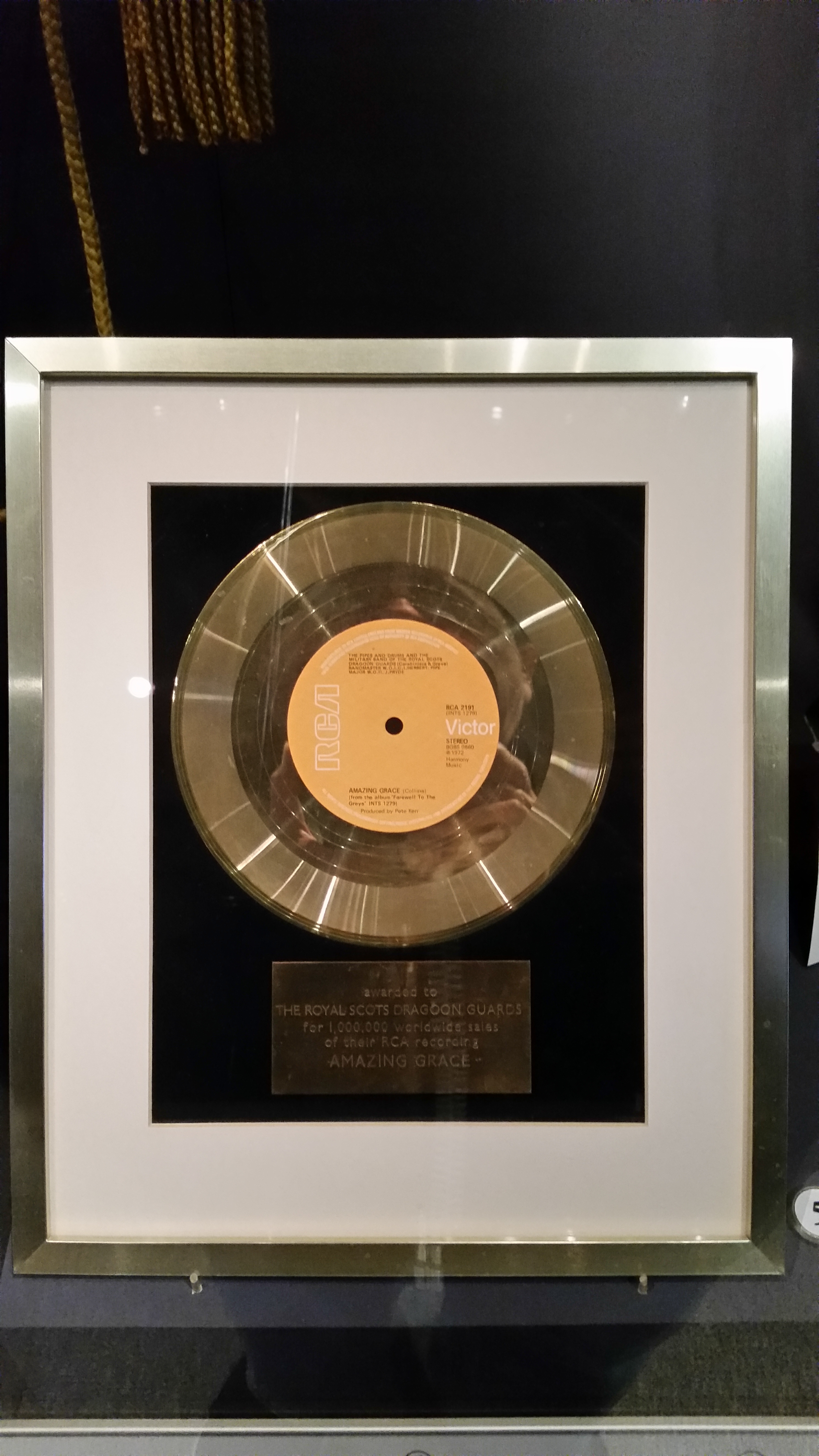
This 2014 photograph shows the gold disc awarded to The Pipes & Drums & the Military Band of the Royal Scots Dragoon Guards for one million worldwide sales of their recording of "Amazing Grace", which became the UK's best-selling single of 1972, spending nine weeks in the top 10, five of which were at number one.

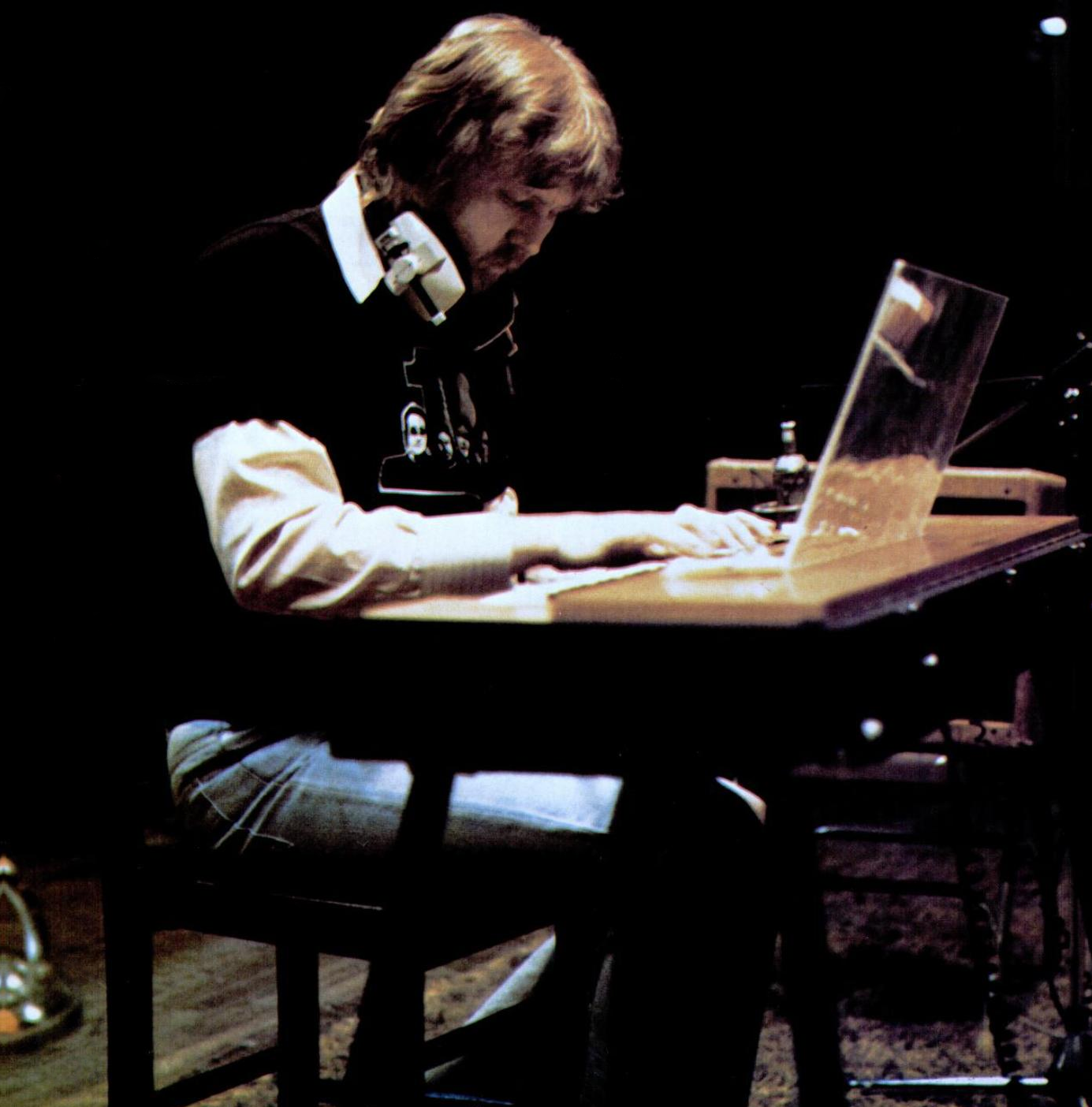
Harry Nilsson, better known by his stage name Nilsson, achieved his one and only UK top 10 single this year with his cover version of "Without You". The song had been originally recorded in 1970 by the rock group Badfinger and was written by band members Pete Ham and Tom Evans. Nilsson's version of the song spent five weeks at number-one and became the UK's fourth best selling single of the year.

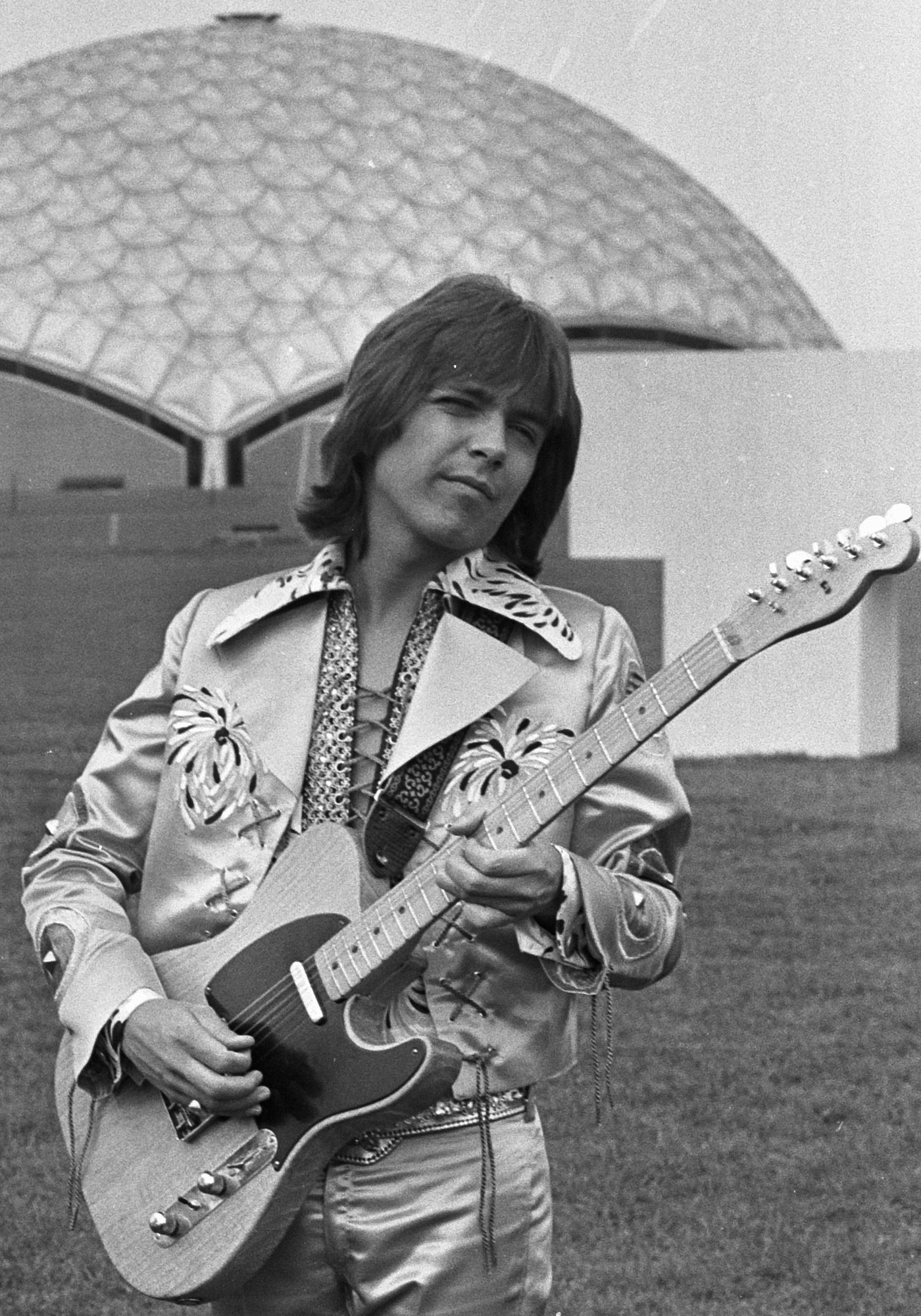
David Cassidy scored a total of three UK top 10 entries in 1972, including one with The Partridge Family. The highest-charting of these entries was his cover version of The Young Rascals' "How Can I Be Sure", which peaked at number-one in September.

The UK Singles Chart is one of many music charts compiled by the Official Charts Company that calculates the best-selling singles of the week in the United Kingdom. Before 2004, the chart was only based on the sales of physical singles. This list shows singles that peaked in the Top 10 of the UK Singles Chart during 1972, as well as singles which peaked in 1971 and 1973 but were in the top 10 in 1972. The entry date is when the single appeared in the top 10 for the first time (week ending, as published by the Official Charts Company, which is six days after the chart is announced).

One-hundred and twenty-three singles were in the top ten in 1972. Seven singles from 1971 remained in the top 10 for several weeks at the beginning of the year, while "Nights in White Satin" by The Moody Blues", "Shotgun Wedding" by Roy "C" and "Solid Gold Easy Action" by T. Rex were all released in 1972 but did not reach their peak until 1973. "Something Tells Me (Something's Gonna Happen Tonight)" by Cilla Black was the only single from 1971 to reach its peak in 1972. Twenty-one artists scored multiple entries in the top 10 in 1972. 10cc, Alice Cooper, Donny Osmond, Electric Light Orchestra, Lynsey de Paul, Roxy Music and Gary Glitter were among the many artists who achieved their first UK charting top 10 single in 1972.

The 1971 Christmas number-one, "Ernie (The Fastest Milkman in the West)" by Benny Hill, remained at number-one for the first weeks of 1972. The first new number-one single of the year was "I'd Like to Teach the World to Sing (In Perfect Harmony)" by The New Seekers. Overall, seventeen different singles peaked at number-one in 1972, with T. Rex and Slade (2) having the joint most singles hit that position.

== Background ==
=== Multiple entries ===
One-hundred and twenty-three singles charted in the top 10 in 1972, with one-hundred and fourteen singles reaching their peak this year.

Twenty-one artists scored multiple entries in the top 10 in 1972. T. Rex secured the record for most top 10 hits in 1972 with six hit singles. This included their number two entry from November 1971, "Jeepster". The group's first two new entries of the year, "Telegram Sam" and "Metal Guru", both reached number-one, while "Children of the Revolution" and "Solid Gold Easy Action" both peaked at number two, although the latter hit its peak position in January 1973. The double-A side single "Debora"/"One Inch Rock" was a re-release of two songs first issued in 1968 which had failed to reach the top 10, recorded under their previous name Tyrannosaurus Rex.

Michael Jackson's five top 10 hits in 1972 counted December's "Lookin' Through the Windows" as part of The Jackson 5, which reached number 9, alongside four solo singles. The highest charting of these was the number 3 entry "Rockin' Robin" in June, several months after "Got to Be There" had peaked at number 5. A cover of "Ain't No Sunshine" made number eight, with his haul rounded off by "Ben" which scraped in at number seven.

Donny Osmond achieved four top 10 entries this year, three of which were as a solo artist. His debut entry "Puppy Love" spent five weeks at number-one in July and August, while the singles "Too Young" and "Why" peaked at numbers five and three respectively. He also featured on The Osmonds' hit single "Crazy Horses", which reached number two in November.

Elvis Presley, Gilbert O'Sullivan, Rod Stewart and Slade were the other artists with four singles in the top 10 during 1972.

David Cassidy scored three top 10 entries in 1972, two of which were as a solo artist. His debut entry "Could It Be Forever"/"Cherish", reached number two in May, while his cover of The Young Rascals' "How Can I Be Sure" topped the chart for two weeks in September and October. Cassidy also featured on The Partridge Family's cover of Neil Sedaka's "Breaking Up Is Hard to Do", which peaked at number three in August. The New Seekers was the other act to make three appearances in the top 10 this year.

Don McLean was one of a number of artists with two top-ten entries, including the number-one single "Vincent". Alice Cooper, Cher, Elton John, Lindisfarne and The Supremes were among the other artists who had multiple top 10 entries in 1972.

=== Chart debuts ===
Forty-seven artists achieved their first top 10 single in 1972, either as a lead or featured artist. Of these, four went on to record another hit single that year: Don McLean, Gary Glitter, Lindisfarne and Little Jimmy Osmond. David Cassidy recorded two other top 10 hits in 1972. Donny Osmond had three other entries in his breakthrough year.

The following table (collapsed on desktop site) does not include acts who had previously charted as part of a group and secured their first top 10 solo single.

Artist	Number of top 10s	First entry	Chart position	Other entries
The Congregation	1	"Softly Whispering I Love You"	4	—
Johnny Pearson Orchestra	1	"Sleepy Shores"	8	—
Neil Reid	1	"Mother of Mine"	2	—
America	1	"A Horse with No Name"	3	—
Donnie Elbert	1	"Where Did Our Love Go"	8	—
The Chi-Lites	1	"Have You Seen Her"	3	—
Chicory Tip	1	"Son of My Father"	1	—
Don McLean	2	"American Pie"	2	"Vincent" (1)
Nilsson	1	"Without You"	1	—
Chelsea Football Team	1	"Blue Is the Colour"	5	—
Lindisfarne	2	"Meet Me on the Corner"	5	"Lady Eleanor" (3)
Argent	1	"Hold Your Head Up"	5	—
Les Crane	1	"Desiderata"	7	—
The Pipes and Drums and the Military Band of the Royal Scots Dragoon Guards	1	"Amazing Grace"	1	—
The Chiffons	1	"Sweet Talkin' Guy"	4	—
Jo Jo Gunne	1	"Run Run Run"	6	
Vicky Leandros	1	"Come What May"	2	—
David Cassidy	3	"Could It Be Forever"/"Cherish"	2	"Breaking Up Is Hard to Do" (3), "How Can I Be Sure" (1)
Evangel Temple Choir	1	"A Thing Called Love"	4	—
Leeds United Football Team	1	"Leeds United"	10	—
New World	1	"Sister Jane"	9	—
Wings	1	"Mary Had a Little Lamb"	9	—
Gary Glitter	2	"Rock and Roll (Parts 1 & 2)"	2	"I Didn't Know I Loved You (Till I Saw You Rock and Roll)" (4)
Donny Osmond	4	"Puppy Love"	1	"Too Young" (5), "Why" (3), "Crazy Horses" (2)
Dr. Hook & the Medicine Show	1	"Sylvia's Mother"	2	—
The Partridge Family	1	"Breaking Up Is Hard to Do"	3	—
Terry Dactyl and the Dinosaurs	1	"Seaside Shuffle"	2	—
Alice Cooper	1	"School's Out"	1	"Elected" (4)
Bruce Ruffin	1	"Mad About You"	9	—
Hawkwind	1	"Silver Machine"	3	—
Hot Butter	1	"Popcorn"	5	—
Faron Young	1	"It's Four in the Morning"	3	—
Mott the Hoople	1	"All the Young Dudes"	3	—
Derek and the Dominos	1	"Layla"	7	—
Electric Light Orchestra	1	"10538 Overture"	9	—
Blackfoot Sue	1	"Standing in the Road"	4	—
Lynsey de Paul	1	"Sugar Me"	5	—
Roxy Music	1	"Virginia Plain"	4	—
Lieutenant Pigeon	1	"Mouldy Old Dough"	1	—
Peter Skellern	1	"You're a Lady"	3	—
Python Lee Jackson	1	"In a Broken Dream"	3	—
10cc	1	"Donna"	2	—
The Shangri-Las	1	"Leader of the Pack"	3	—
The Osmonds	1	"Crazy Horses"	2	—
Little Jimmy Osmond	2	"Crazy Horses"	2	"Long Haired Lover from Liverpool" (1)
The Stylistics	1	"I'm Stone in Love with You"	9	—
Harlem Community Choir	1	"Happy Xmas (War is Over)"	4	—

Notes

The line-up of Faces consisted of Rod Stewart, Ronnie Wood and three members of the disbanded Small Faces - Ian McLagan, Kenney Jones and Ronnie Lane. All of them, barring Wood, had previous top 10 singles to their name, the most recent to debut being Stewart with "Maggie May"/"Reason to Believe" in 1971.

Michael Jackson had four entries as a solo artist this year for the first time, alongside a single with his group The Jackson 5. The band had debuted in 1970 with their breakthrough hit "I Want You Back". Wings was a side-project for Paul McCartney after the dissolution of legendary group The Beatles following the end of 1960s Beatlemania.

Jonathan King charted under the pseudonym Shag in 1972 for the first time with the song "Loop di Love". He had appeared in the chart in 1965 with "Everyone's Gone to the Moon", but used his own name. Junior Campbell left Marmalade in 1971 and just a year later he celebrated a top 10 solo single, "Hallelujah Freedom".

=== Songs from films ===
The only song from a film to enter the top 10 in 1972 was "Ben" (from Ben). Additionally, the melody from "The Young New Mexican Puppeteer" was adapted from the score to the 1940 film Pinocchio.

=== Best-selling singles ===
The Pipes & Drums & the Military Band of the Royal Scots Dragoon Guards had the best-selling single of the year with "Amazing Grace". The song spent nine weeks in the top 10 (including five weeks at number one), sold over 890,000 copies and was certified by the BPI. "Mouldy Old Dough" by Lieutenant Pigeon came in second place, selling more than 790,000 copies and losing out by around 100,000 sales. Donny Osmond's "Puppy Love", "Without You" from Nilsson and "I'd Like to Teach the World to Sing (In Perfect Harmony)" by The New Seekers made up the top five. Songs by Chicory Tip, Gary Glitter, T. Rex ("Metal Guru"), Neil Reid and T. Rex ("Telegram Sam") were also in the top ten best-selling singles of the year.

== Top-ten singles ==
Key

Symbol	Meaning
‡	Single peaked in 1971 but still in chart in 1972.
♦	Single released in 1972 but peaked in 1973.
(#)	Year-end top-ten single position and rank
Entered	The date that the single first appeared in the chart.
Peak	Highest position that the single reached in the UK Singles Chart.

Entered (week ending)	Weeks in top 10	Single	Artist	Peak	Peak reached (week ending)	Weeks at peak
Singles in 1971
20 November 1971	7	"Gypsys, Tramps & Thieves" ‡	Cher	4	27 November 1971	2
20 November 1971	9	"Jeepster" ‡	T. Rex	2	27 November 1971	5
27 November 1971	8	"Ernie (The Fastest Milkman in the West)" ‡	Benny Hill	1	11 December 1971	4
4 December 1971	5	"Tokoloshe Man" ‡	John Kongos	4	11 December 1971	1
11 December 1971	5	"Theme from Shaft" ‡	Isaac Hayes	4	18 December 1971	2
11 December 1971	5	"No Matter How I Try" ‡	Gilbert O'Sullivan	5	18 December 1971	2
18 December 1971	5	"Something Tells Me (Something's Gonna Happen Tonight)"	Cilla Black	3	1 January 1972	1
Singles in 1972
1 January 1972	8	"I'd Like to Teach the World to Sing (In Perfect Harmony)" (#5)	The New Seekers	1	8 January 1972	4
1 January 1972	4	"Softly Whispering I Love You"	The Congregation	4	8 January 1972	2
1 January 1972	4	"Soley Soley"	Middle of the Road	5	8 January 1972	2
8 January 1972	3	"Sleepy Shores"	Johnny Pearson Orchestra	8	8 January 1972	1
8 January 1972	5	"I Just Can't Help Believing"	Elvis Presley	6	22 January 1972	2
15 January 1972	8	"Mother of Mine" (#9) ^{[A]}	Neil Reid	2	15 January 1972	3
15 January 1972	5	"Brand New Key"	Melanie	4	22 January 1972	1
22 January 1972	4	"A Horse with No Name"	America	3	22 January 1972	1
22 January 1972	3	"Stay with Me"	Faces	6	5 February 1972	1
22 January 1972	2	"Morning Has Broken"	Cat Stevens	9	29 January 1972	1
29 January 1972	5	"Telegram Sam" (#10)	T. Rex	1	5 February 1972	2
29 January 1972	2	"Where Did Our Love Go"	Donnie Elbert	8	29 January 1972	2
29 January 1972	4	"Let's Stay Together"	Al Green	7	12 February 1972	1
5 February 1972	5	"Have You Seen Her"	The Chi-Lites	3	19 February 1972	1
12 February 1972	6	"Son of My Father" (#6)	Chicory Tip	1	19 February 1972	3
12 February 1972	5	"Look Wot You Dun"	Slade	4	19 February 1972	3
12 February 1972	2	"All I Ever Need is You"	Sonny & Cher	8	19 February 1972	1
19 February 1972	8	"American Pie"	Don McLean	2	4 March 1972	3
19 February 1972	3	"Storm in a Teacup"	The Fortunes	7	26 February 1972	1
26 February 1972	11	"Without You" (#4)	Nilsson	1	11 March 1972	5
26 February 1972	6	"Got to be There"	Michael Jackson	5	4 March 1972	1
26 February 1972	2	"Day After Day"	Badfinger	10	26 February 1972	2
4 March 1972	5	"Mother and Child Reunion"	Paul Simon	5	18 March 1972	1
4 March 1972	3	"Blue is the Colour" ^{[B]}	Chelsea Football Team	5	11 March 1972	1
11 March 1972	7	"Beg, Steal or Borrow" ^{[C]}	The New Seekers	2	25 March 1972	3
11 March 1972	7	"Alone Again (Naturally)"	Gilbert O'Sullivan	3	1 April 1972	1
11 March 1972	5	"Meet Me on the Corner"	Lindisfarne	5	25 March 1972	1
25 March 1972	5	"Hold Your Head Up"	Argent	5	1 April 1972	2
25 March 1972	4	"Desiderata"	Les Crane	7	1 April 1972	1
25 March 1972	3	"Floy Joy"	The Supremes	9	1 April 1972	1
8 April 1972	9	"Amazing Grace" (#1)	The Pipes & Drums & the Military Band of the Royal Scots Dragoon Guards	1	15 April 1972	5
8 April 1972	6	"Sweet Talkin' Guy"	The Chiffons	4	22 April 1972	2
15 April 1972	4	"Back Off Boogaloo"	Ringo Starr	2	29 April 1972	2
15 April 1972	3	"The Young New Mexican Puppeteer"	Tom Jones	6	29 April 1972	1
15 April 1972	1	"Heart of Gold"	Neil Young	10	15 April 1972	1
22 April 1972	2	"Until It's Time for You to Go"	Elvis Presley	5	22 April 1972	1
22 April 1972	5	"Run Run Run"	Jo Jo Gunne	6	6 May 1972	1
29 April 1972	6	"Come What May" ^{[D]}	Vicky Leandros	2	13 May 1972	1
29 April 1972	2	"Debora"/"One Inch Rock" ^{[E]}	Tyrannosaurus Rex	7	29 April 1972	1
29 April 1972	4	"Radancer"	Marmalade	6	13 May 1972	1
6 May 1972	6	"Could It Be Forever"/"Cherish"	David Cassidy	2	27 May 1972	1
6 May 1972	5	"A Thing Called Love"	Johnny Cash & the Evangel Temple Choir	4	13 May 1972	1
13 May 1972	3	"Tumbling Dice"	The Rolling Stones	5	13 May 1972	1
13 May 1972	5	"Rocket Man"	Elton John	2	3 June 1972	1
13 May 1972	7	"Metal Guru" (#8)	T. Rex	1	20 May 1972	4
20 May 1972	7	"At the Club"/"Saturday Night at the Movies"	The Drifters	3	3 June 1972	1
27 May 1972	4	"Oh Babe, What Would You Say"	Hurricane Smith	4	3 June 1972	2
27 May 1972	1	"Leeds United" ^{[F]}	Leeds United Football Team	10	27 May 1972	1
3 June 1972	7	"Vincent"	Don McLean	1	17 June 1972	2
3 June 1972	4	"Lady Eleanor"	Lindisfarne	3	10 June 1972	1
10 June 1972	5	"California Man"	The Move	7	17 June 1972	3
10 June 1972	2	"Sister Jane"	New World	9	10 June 1972	2
10 June 1972	6	"Rockin' Robin"	Michael Jackson	3	24 June 1972	1
17 June 1972	6	"Take Me Bak 'Ome"	Slade	1	1 July 1972	1
17 June 1972	3	"Mary Had a Little Lamb"	Wings	9	24 June 1972	2
24 June 1972	8	"Rock and Roll (Parts 1 & 2)" (#7)	Gary Glitter	2	8 July 1972	3
24 June 1972	5	"Little Willy"	Sweet	4	1 July 1972	2
1 July 1972	9	"Puppy Love" (#3)	Donny Osmond	1	8 July 1972	5
1 July 1972	4	"An American Trilogy"	Elvis Presley	8	1 July 1972	1
8 July 1972	6	"Circles"	The New Seekers	4	22 July 1972	1
8 July 1972	1	"Ooh-Wakka-Doo-Wakka-Day"	Gilbert O'Sullivan	8	8 July 1972	1
15 July 1972	6	"Sylvia's Mother"	Dr. Hook & the Medicine Show	2	29 July 1972	1
15 July 1972	5	"I Can See Clearly Now"	Johnny Nash	5	22 July 1972	1
22 July 1972	6	"Breaking Up Is Hard to Do"	The Partridge Family	3	12 August 1972	1
22 July 1972	1	"Join Together"	The Who	9	22 July 1972	1
29 July 1972	6	"Seaside Shuffle"	Terry Dactyl and the Dinosaurs	2	12 August 1972	2
29 July 1972	6	"School's Out"	Alice Cooper	1	12 August 1972	3
29 July 1972	1	"Mad About You"	Bruce Ruffin	9	29 July 1972	1
29 July 1972	1	"Starman"	David Bowie	10	29 July 1972	1
5 August 1972	6	"Silver Machine"	Hawkwind	3	19 August 1972	2
5 August 1972	1	"Automatically Sunshine"	The Supremes	10	5 August 1972	1
12 August 1972	4	"Popcorn"	Hot Butter	5	19 August 1972	1
19 August 1972	6	"You Wear It Well"	Rod Stewart	1	2 September 1972	1
19 August 1972	1	"Run to Me"	Bee Gees	9	19 August 1972	1
19 August 1972	7	"It's Four in the Morning" ^{[G]}	Faron Young	3	16 September 1972	1
26 August 1972	4	"All the Young Dudes"	Mott the Hoople	3	9 September 1972	1
26 August 1972	3	"Layla"	Derek and the Dominos	7	26 August 1972	2
26 August 1972	1	"10538 Overture"	Electric Light Orchestra	9	26 August 1972	1
2 September 1972	6	"Mama Weer All Crazee Now"	Slade	1	9 September 1972	3
2 September 1972	3	"Standing in the Road"	Blackfoot Sue	4	9 September 1972	1
9 September 1972	3	"Sugar Me"	Lynsey de Paul	5	16 September 1972	2
9 September 1972	4	"Virginia Plain"	Roxy Music	4	16 September 1972	1
9 September 1972	2	"I Get the Sweetest Feeling"	Jackie Wilson	9	16 September 1972	1
16 September 1972	3	"Ain't No Sunshine"	Michael Jackson	8	16 September 1972	3
16 September 1972	6	"How Can I Be Sure"	David Cassidy	1	30 September 1972	2
23 September 1972	5	"Children of the Revolution"	T. Rex	2	23 September 1972	3
23 September 1972	4	"Too Young"	Donny Osmond	5	30 September 1972	2
23 September 1972	3	"Come on Over to My Place"	The Drifters	9	30 September 1972	1
30 September 1972	8	"Mouldy Old Dough" (#2)	Lieutenant Pigeon	1	14 October 1972	4
30 September 1972	5	"Wig-Wam Bam"	Sweet	4	7 October 1972	1
7 October 1972	5	"You're a Lady"	Peter Skellern	3	14 October 1972	2
7 October 1972	4	"I Didn't Know I Loved You (Till I Saw You Rock and Roll)"	Gary Glitter	4	14 October 1972	1
14 October 1972	4	"Burning Love"	Elvis Presley	7	21 October 1972	1
14 October 1972	5	"In a Broken Dream" ^{[H]}	Python Lee Jackson	3	28 October 1972	1
14 October 1972	5	"Donna"	10cc	2	21 October 1972	2
21 October 1972	4	"Elected"	Alice Cooper	4	28 October 1972	2
28 October 1972	6	"Clair"	Gilbert O'Sullivan	1	11 November 1972	2
28 October 1972	2	"There are More Questions Than Answers"	Johnny Nash	9	28 October 1972	1
4 November 1972	5	"Leader of the Pack" ^{[I]}	The Shangri-Las	3	18 November 1972	1
4 November 1972	4	"Loop di Love"	Shag	4	18 November 1972	1
11 November 1972	9	"My Ding-a-Ling"	Chuck Berry	1	25 November 1972	4
11 November 1972	1	"Goodbye to Love"	The Carpenters	9	11 November 1972	1
11 November 1972	1	"Hallelujah Freedom"	Junior Campbell	10	11 November 1972	1
18 November 1972	7	"Why"	Donny Osmond	3	2 December 1972	1
18 November 1972	10	"Crazy Horses"	The Osmonds	2	25 November 1972	3
18 November 1972	7	"Crocodile Rock"	Elton John	5	25 November 1972	3
18 November 1972	1	"Let's Dance" ^{[J]}	Chris Montez	9	18 November 1972	1
18 November 1972	3	"I'm Stone in Love with You"	The Stylistics	9	25 November 1972	1
25 November 1972	8	"Gudbuy T'Jane"	Slade	2	16 December 1972	1
25 November 1972	4	"Angel"/"What Made Milwaukee Famous (Has Made a Loser Out of Me)"	Rod Stewart	4	9 December 1972	1
2 December 1972	2	"Lookin' Through the Windows"	The Jackson 5	9	2 December 1972	1
9 December 1972	4	"Ben"	Michael Jackson	7	9 December 1972	1
9 December 1972	7	"Solid Gold Easy Action" ♦	T. Rex	2	6 January 1973	1
9 December 1972	11	"Long Haired Lover from Liverpool"	Little Jimmy Osmond	1	23 December 1972	5
16 December 1972	2	"Shotgun Wedding" ♦ ^{[K]}	Roy C	8	6 January 1973	1
23 December 1972	3	"Happy Xmas (War is Over)"	John Lennon, Yoko Ono & Plastic Ono Band with the Harlem Community Choir	4	23 December 1972	2
23 December 1972	3	"Nights in White Satin" ♦	The Moody Blues	9	6 January 1973	1

== Entries by artist ==
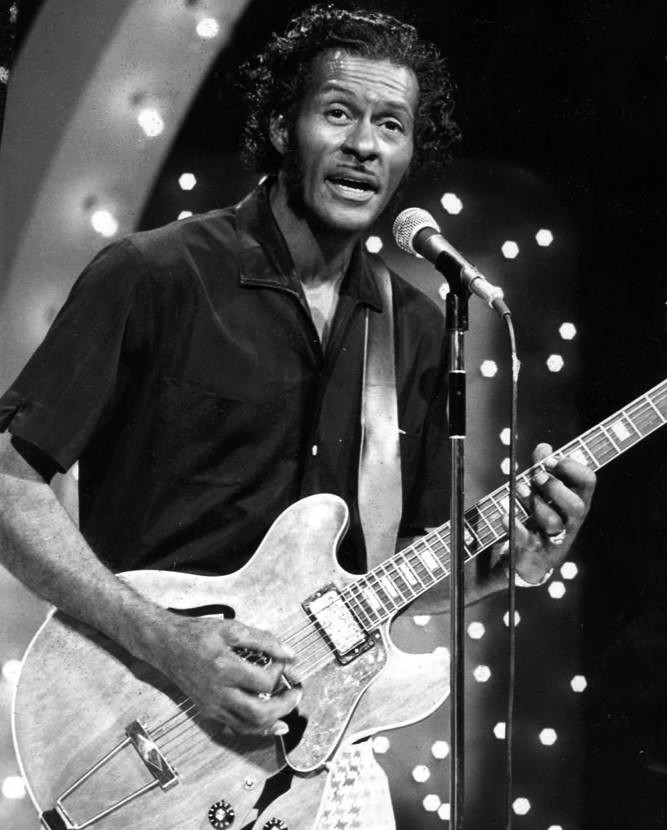
Chuck Berry achieved his only UK number-one single in November of this year with "My Ding-a-Ling", which spent four weeks at the top spot.

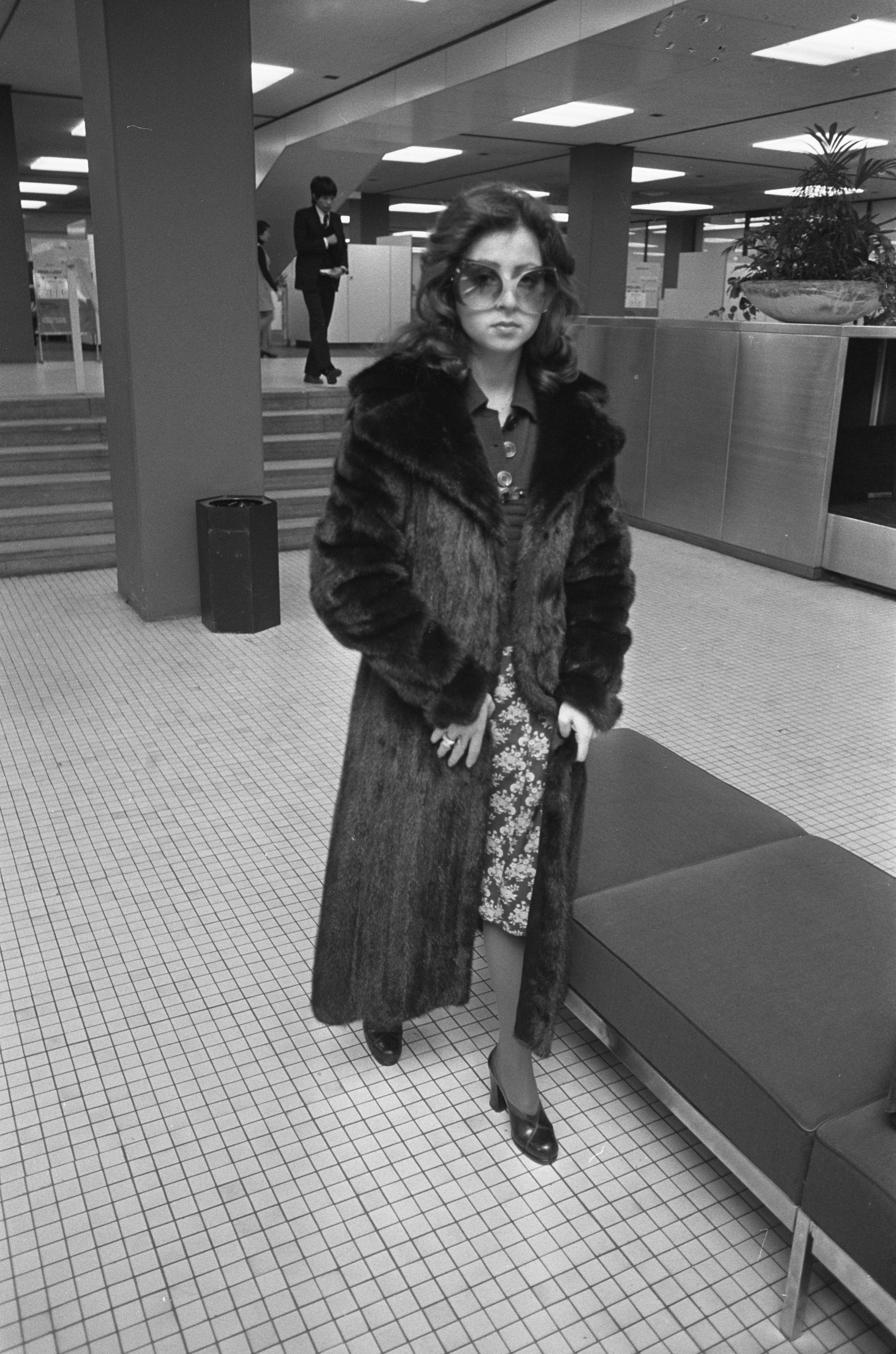
Greek-born singer Vicky Leandros won the 1972 Eurovision Song Contest, representing Luxembourg, with "Après toi". The English-language version of the song, entitled "Come What May", entered the UK top 10 in April, peaking at number two.

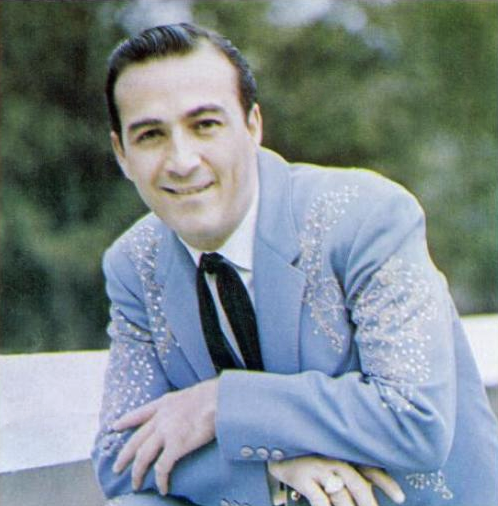
American country music singer Faron Young (pictured in 1964) scored his only entry in the UK Singles Chart this year with "It's Four in the Morning", which peaked at number three.

The following table shows artists who achieved two or more top 10 entries in 1972, including singles that reached their peak in 1971 or 1973. The figures include both main artists and featured artists, while appearances on ensemble charity records are also counted for each artist. The total number of weeks an artist spent in the top ten in 1972 is also shown.

Entries	Artist	Weeks	Singles
6	T. Rex ^{[L]}^{[M]}^{[N]}	26	"Children of the Revolution", "Debora"/"One Inch Rock", "Jeepster", "Metal Guru", "Solid Gold Easy Action", "Telegram Sam"
5	Michael Jackson ^{[O]}	19	"Ain't No Sunshine", "Ben", "Got to Be There", "Lookin' Through the Windows", "Rockin' Robin"
4	Donny Osmond ^{[P]}	27	"Crazy Horses", "Puppy Love", "Too Young", "Why"
4	Elvis Presley	15	"An American Trilogy", "Burning Love", "I Just Can't Help Believing", "Until It's Time for You to Go"
4	Gilbert O'Sullivan ^{[I]}	16	"Alone Again (Naturally)", "Clair", "No Matter How I Try", "Ooh-Wakka-Doo-Wakka-Day"
4	Slade	23	"Gudbuy T'Jane", "Look Wot You Dun", "Mama Weer All Crazee Now", "Take Me Bak 'Ome"
3	David Cassidy ^{[Q]}	18	"Breaking Up Is Hard to Do", "Could It Be Forever"/"Cherish", "How Can I Be Sure"
3	The New Seekers	21	"Beg, Steal or Borrow", "Circles", "I'd Like to Teach the World to Sing (In Perfect Harmony)"
3	Rod Stewart ^{[R]}	18	"Angel"/"What's Made Milwaukee Famous (Has Made a Loser Out of Me)", "Stay with Me", "You Wear It Well"
2	Alice Cooper	10	"Elected", "School's Out"
2	Cher ^{[L]}^{[S]}	3	"All I Ever Need Is You", "Gypsys, Tramps & Thieves"
2	Don McLean	15	"American Pie", "Vincent"
2	The Drifters	10	"At the Club"/"Saturday Night at the Movies", "Come On Over to My Place"
2	Elton John	12	"Crocodile Rock", "Rocket Man"
2	Gary Glitter	12	"I Didn't Know I Loved You (Till I Saw You Rock and Roll)", "Rock and Roll (Parts 1 & 2)"
2	Johnny Nash	7	"I Can See Clearly Now", "There Are More Questions Than Answers"
2	Lindisfarne	9	"Lady Eleanor", "Meet Me on the Corner"
2	Little Jimmy Osmond	11	"Crazy Horses", "Long Haired Lover from Liverpool"
2	The Supremes	4	"Automatically Sunshine", "Floy Joy"
2	Sweet	10	"Little Willy", "Wig-Wam Bam"

== Notes ==
- ^{a} "Mother of Mine" re-entered the top 10 at number 10 on 18 March 1972 (week ending).
- ^{b} "Blue Is the Colour" was released by Chelsea F.C. to celebrate reaching the League Cup Final.
- ^{c} "Beg, Steal or Borrow" was the United Kingdom's entry at the Eurovision Song Contest in 1972.
- ^{d} "Come What May (Après toi)" was Luxembourg's winning entry at the Eurovision Song Contest in 1972.
- ^{e} "Debora" and "One Inch Rock" were originally released as individual singles in 1968 under T. Rex's former name Tyrannosaurus Rex, peaking at number 34 and number 28 respectively.
- ^{f} "Leeds United" was released by Leeds United F.C. to celebrate reaching the FA Cup Final.
- ^{g} "It's Four in the Morning" re-entered the top 10 at number 6 on 2 September 1972 (week ending) for 6 weeks.
- ^{h} "In a Broken Dream" features uncredited lead vocals from Rod Stewart.
- ^{i} "Leader of the Pack" originally peaked outside the top 10 at number 11 on its initial release in 1965.
- ^{j} "Let's Dance" originally peaked at number 2 on its initial release in 1962.
- ^{k} "Shotgun Wedding" re-entered the top 10 at number 8 on 6 January 1973 (week ending). It originally peaked at number 6 on its initial release in 1966.
- ^{l} Figure includes single that peaked in 1971.
- ^{m} Figure includes single that peaked in 1973.
- ^{n} Figure includes the double A-side single "Debora"/"One Inch Rock" recorded under the name Tyrannosaurus Rex.
- ^{o} Figure includes a top 10 hit with the group The Jackson 5.
- ^{p} Figure includes a top 10 hit with the group The Osmonds.
- ^{q} Figure includes a top 10 hit with the group The Partridge Family.
- ^{r} Figure includes a top 10 hit with the group Faces.
- ^{s} Figure includes a top 10 hit in the duo Sonny and Cher.

== See also ==
- 1972 in British music
- List of number-one singles from the 1970s (UK)
