= Children of the Revolution (song) =

Single by T. Rex
- B-side: "Jitterbug Love"; "Sunken Rags"
- Released: 8 September 1972
- Genre: Glam rock
- Length: 2:29
- Label: EMI; Reprise
- Songwriter: Marc Bolan
- Producer: Tony Visconti

T. Rex singles chronology
"Metal Guru" (1972)	"Children of the Revolution" (1972)	"Solid Gold Easy Action" (1972)

"Children of the Revolution" is a song by English rock band T. Rex, written by Marc Bolan. It was a UK number 2 hit single in September 1972. The song broke their sequence of four official single releases all reaching number 1 on the UK Singles Chart ("Hot Love", "Get It On", "Telegram Sam" and "Metal Guru", although unofficial releases "Jeepster" and "Debora" had only reached number 2 and 7 respectively), although it did reach the summit position on the New Musical Express and Melody Maker charts, becoming the last T. Rex single to do so on any UK chart. It did not receive a regular album release.

== Recording ==
=== "Children of the Revolution" ===
A studio rehearsal of the song, at over twelve minutes in length, was recorded on 31 March 1972 at Copenhagen's Rosenberg Studios during sessions for the band's third album The Slider. Flo & Eddie, formerly of the Turtles, contribute backing vocals to this version of the release. The tape box contained the note that the jam was "for the attention of Ringo".

"Children of the Revolution" was next recorded on 6 April 1972 at Apple Studios for the film Born to Boogie, featuring Elton John on piano and Ringo Starr on a drum kit, along with a cover of Little Richard's "Tutti Frutti".

The recording of the single version of the song began during the initial sessions for the Tanx album in August 1972. The track was mixed at Air Studios in mid August before being released on 8 September.

=== "Jitterbug Love" ===
"Jitterbug Love" was initially recorded on 2 August 1972 at the Château d'Hérouville in France, however only the drum track recorded at this session made it to the final release. Additional instrumentation was added at Air Studios on 11 August 1972.

=== "Sunken Rags" ===
"Sunken Rags" was recorded during the last of the sessions for The Slider at Rosenberg Studios, Copenhagen in March 1972. A version, credited to Marc Bolan solo, appeared prior to the single release on the 1972 Glastonbury Fayre compilation album.

== Release and reception ==
The single was released on 8 September 1972. While it topped the Melody Maker and NME charts it could only reach number 2 on the official Record Retailer chart, breaking a run of number one hits for the group. Reviews in the UK were largely positive, with many critics noting the song sounding heavier than the group's usual fare. Penny Valentine of Sounds enthusiastically remarked that it was "the best he's ever done" while Chris Welch of Melody Maker opined it was "a good song with plenty of attack". Conversely, Danny Holloway of NME complained that Bolan "had run a good thing into the ground".

== Cover versions ==
In 1986, Violent Femmes released the version of the single from their album The Blind Leading the Naked.

In 1989, Greater Manchester artist Baby Ford released an acid house version on the Rhythm King record label. This cover was a No. 53 hit in the UK Singles Chart in 1989.

In 1992, former Iron Maiden singer Paul Di'Anno's new band Killers recorded a version on the Murder One album.

In 2001, Bono handled lead vocals on a version for the Baz Luhrmann film Moulin Rouge! and the accompanying soundtrack.

In 2011, Scorpions covered the song on their Comeblack album.

In 2020, Karmina covered the song as a single.

In June 2020, it was announced that Kesha would record a cover of the song along with Marc Bolan's son, Rolan, on backing vocals. The tribute album containing the recording, Angelheaded Hipster: The Songs of Marc Bolan & T. Rex, was released in September 2020.

== Legacy ==
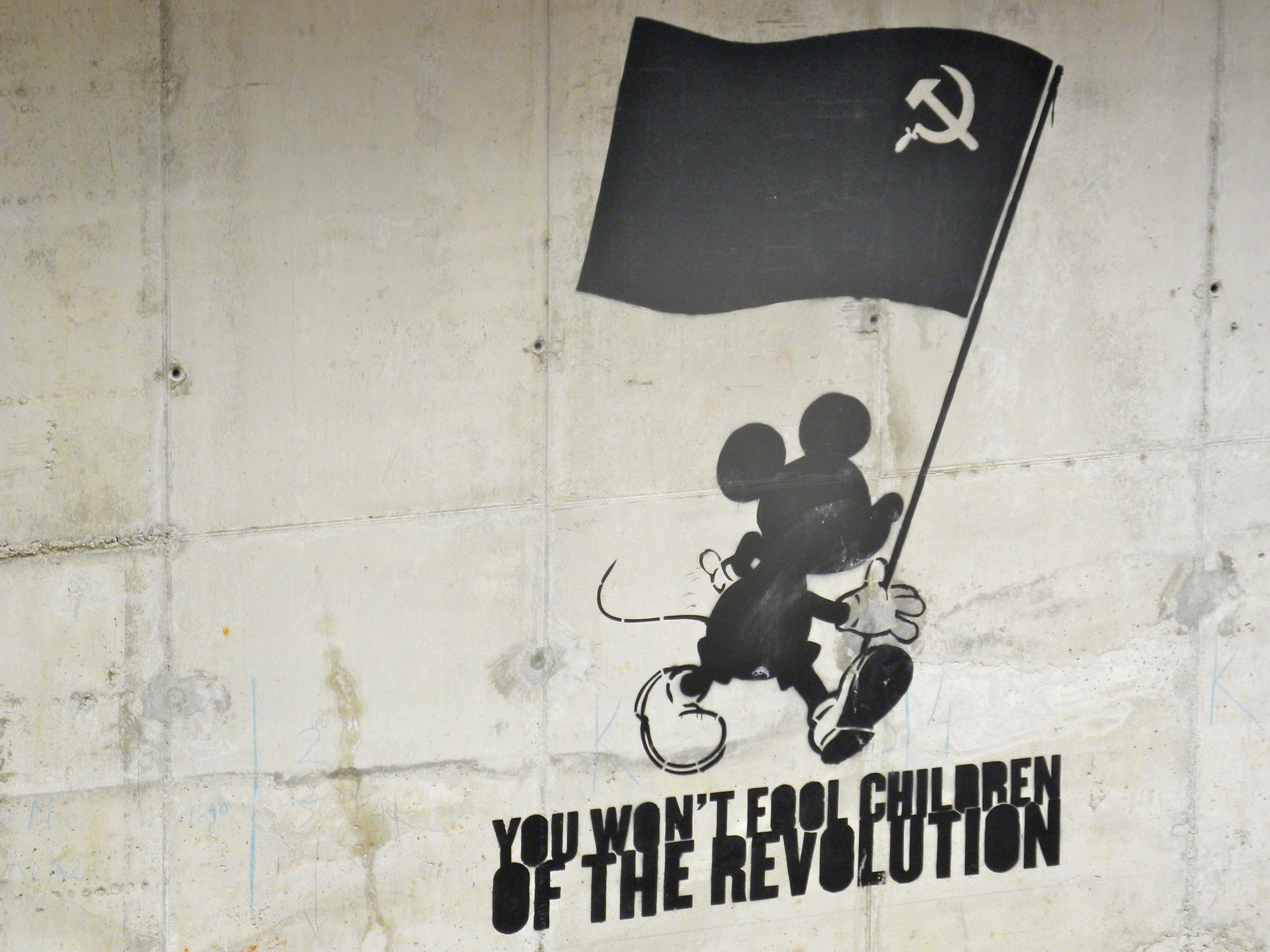
The song quoted on a graffito in Zagreb.

Dinaw Mengestu's 2017 novel The Beautiful Things That Heaven Bears was originally published in the UK as Children of the Revolution, and includes lyrics from the song within the story.

In 2014, Sonic Youth vocalist and guitarist Thurston Moore named "Children of the Revolution" as one of his 25 favourite songs.

== Charts ==
=== T. Rex version ===
Chart (1972–1973)	Peak position
Australia (Go-Set National Top 40)	11
Australia (Kent Music Report)	13
Austria (Ö3 Austria Top 40)	7
France (IFOP)	34
Germany (GfK)	4
Ireland (IRMA)	1
Spain (AFYVE)	14
UK Singles (Official Charts)	2

Year-end chart (1972)	Rank
Australia (Kent Music Report)	72

=== Baby Ford version ===
Chart (1989)	Peak position
Belgium (Ultratop 50 Flanders)	42
UK Singles (Official Charts)	53

== Certifications ==
Region	Certification	Certified units/sales
United Kingdom (BPI)	Silver	200,000^{‡}
^{‡} Sales+streaming figures based on certification alone.

== See also ==
- List of number-one singles of 1972 (Ireland)
