= Born to Boogie (film) =

1972 British film by Ringo Starr

- Theatrical release poster
- Directed by: Ringo Starr
- Produced by: Ringo Starr
- Starring: T. Rex; Marc Bolan; Ringo Starr; Elton John
- Cinematography: Michael J. Davis; Mike Dodds; Nicholas D. Knowland; Richard Stanley; Ringo Starr; Jeremy Stavenhagen
- Edited by: Graham Gilding
- Distributed by: MGM-EMI
- Release date: 18 December 1972
- Running time: 63 minutes
- Country: United Kingdom
- Language: English

Born to Boogie is a 1972 British film of a concert at the Empire Pool starring T. Rex, Marc Bolan, Ringo Starr and Elton John. Directed and produced by Starr, the film was released on the Beatles' Apple Films label.

== Background ==
By the beginning of 1972, T. Rex had become England's best-selling band, with its album Electric Warrior perched at No. 1 while the group's latest single, "Telegram Sam" became its third No. 1 single (along with two others that had hit No. 2). The press dubbed the attendant fan mania "T. Rextasy", the 1970s equivalent of Beatlemania with levels of frenzied screaming and swooning not heard since the mid-60s. After a brief American tour in February 1972 to capitalize on the top ten success of "Bang a Gong (Get It On)" in that country, two hometown concerts at the Empire Pool in Wembley were scheduled for March. Bolan had the idea of filming the shows for a concert movie and hired Ringo Starr at Apple Films to direct and produce, although the project soon expanded beyond the concert footage.

== Content ==
The concerts at Wembley were held on March 18, 1972, just after the bulk of The Slider had been recorded in France, and received front-page press attention. Chris Charlesworth of Melody Maker subsequently wrote "all Marc had to do was smile to receive the kind of ovation that any artist in the world would envy...every move brings a scream...and when he grins and shakes his head, the din is deafening". In retrospect, many commentators pinpoint these shows as the peak of T. Rextasy. Starr filmed both the matinee and evening performances for the film, although only songs from the evening performance made the final cut of the movie, with only brief shots of the matinee show seen during the closing credits (in 2005, both the matinee and evening shows would be included in their entirety for the film's DVD release). Issues with the sound quality, as well as the skeletal sound of the live group, led to extensive overdubbing of new lead and backing vocals as well as some new guitar parts to the footage.

Marc described Born to Boogie as a film with surrealistic overtones, with some fantasy sequences strongly reminiscent of the look and feel of The Beatles' Magical Mystery Tour. On March 20, Starr filmed Bolan playing guitar in an aircraft hangar at Denham Airfield for the film's opening, as well as several 'dream' sequences which did not make the final edit. Starr and Bolan were also filmed goofing around in a car on the runway, attempting to sing Elvis' 1957 hit "Let's Have a Party". After more recording to finish The Slider, a superstar jam session of T. Rex with Ringo on drums and Elton John on piano was filmed on 6 April at Apple Studios in Savile Row, London. Versions of "Tutti Frutti" and an early, fast take of "Children of the Revolution" made the film, with renditions of "Long Tall Sally" and "The Slider" possibly left on the cutting room floor. On April 24, the Mad Hatter's Tea Party sequence was shot at John Lennon's Tittenhurst Park estate in the same spot as Lennon's own "Imagine" video. Attendees of this scene include Marc, Mickey Finn, Starr, Marc's wife June, PR agent Chelita Secunda (dressed as a nun), Starr's financial advisor Hilary Gerrard and actor Geoffrey Bayldon (who played the master of ceremonies) along with a string quartet.

The songs seen performed in the film, in order, are "Jeepster", "Baby Strange", "Tutti Frutti", "Children of the Revolution", "Spaceball Ricochet", "Telegram Sam", "Cosmic Dancer", "Tea Party Medley: Jeepster/Hot Love/Get It On/The Slider", "Hot Love" and "Get It On", with "Chariot Choogle" playing at the end credits.

== Release ==
The UK premiere was held at Oscar's Cinema in Brewer Street, Soho, London, on 14 December 1972, attended by T. Rex, Starr and John. After the premiere, a glitzy after-party was held at Tramp Night Club whose attendees also included Donovan, Bernie Taupin, and Keith Moon.

The film was released on DVD in 2005 as a two-disc set including the original theatrical film, the two Wembley concerts in full, plus footage presented by Bolan's son Rolan. The 2005 cover and DVD animations were designed and produced by Bose Collins.

Edsel Records re-released the film on DVD and Blu-ray in 2016.

== Reception ==
The film received largely negative reviews upon release, as Bolan began to receive the first blowback to his success. Nick Kent of New Musical Express called the concert footage "fuzzy, primal and repetitive but that's OK" before savaging Bolan's acoustic performances as reaching "new heights of fey precociousness...he whines obnoxiously for over five minutes", although he praised the superstar jam session with Ringo and Elton. Robert Whittaker of Music Week claimed it was "merely a collection of shots from T. Rex's recent Wembley concert alternating with meaningless indulgent sketches which only underline the complete lack of purpose of it all", although he too called the Ringo/Elton jam a "rock revelation". The Daily Mirror groaned "anyone under the mental age of eight – and tone deaf – might find a glimmer of entertainment in this nightmare of noise".

By contrast, The Monthly Film Bulletin wrote: "Ringo Starr's film proves to be considerably more than just a portrait of another successful band. If its live sequences obviously owe a lot to Pennebaker's Monterey Pop, Born to Boogie also looks further back, to Dick Lester's Beatles films and even to the teen musicals of the late Fifties. It is Bolan rather than T. Rex who provides the film with its focal point. From the opening credits – where a still of Eddie Cochran is followed by footage of Bolan bursting into action for a live performance – it's apparent that he sees his music as both a homage to the great solo rock artists and a continuation of their tradition: he performs his own version of Chuck Berry's celebrated duck-walk in "Jeepster" delivers a faithful rendition of "Tutti Frutti" (with Elton John hammering away on the studio piano), and recreates Hendrix's orgasmic routine for the climactic "Get It On", running a tambourine up and down the fret of his guitar before finally tossing it into space. But what raises the film beyond straightforward musical reportage is the way Ringo has linked the concert footage with a number of scenes which could loosely be described as English surrealism, quirky mid-Sixties vintage, and for which the closest parallel is with the Beatles' own Magical Mystery Tour".

Retrospective reviews have been far more positive, labeling the film a cult classic that historically preserves the ecstatic excitement of T. Rextasy at its peak. Joobin Bekhrad of Bright Lights Film Journal labels it "one of the most intriguing rock films ever made", noting "a teen idol he certainly is here; but one also sees Bolan as a masterful musician, inveterate poet, and beguiling figure. In other words, the film depicts Bolan exactly as he saw himself and how he likely wanted to be remembered." In a review of the 2016 DVD/Blu-Ray re-release, Chris Roberts at Classic Rock gave it four-and-a-half stars, opining "Marc's bravado was infectious, and briefly and brilliantly they were the only game in Glam Rock town. It's only in later decades that they've been appreciated as a genuinely astonishing band, flush with flair, funk and fire. Perhaps this flawed but lovable document has played a part in that more enduring acceptance."

== Sources ==
- Madinger, Chip; Easter, Mark (2000). Eight Arms to Hold You: The Solo Beatles Compendium. Chesterfield, MO: 44.1 Productions. ISBN 0-615-11724-4.
