= Tanx =

Studio album by T. Rex
- Released: 16 March 1973
- Recorded: 1 August – 3 December 1972
- Studios: Château d'Hérouville, France
- Genres: Glam rock; psychedelic soul
- Length: 35:03
- Labels: EMI (UK); Reprise (US)
- Producer: Tony Visconti

T. Rex chronology
The Slider (1972)	Tanx (1973)	Zinc Alloy and the Hidden Riders of Tomorrow (1974)

Tanx is the eighth studio album by English rock band T. Rex, and their fourth under the moniker T. Rex. It was released on 16 March 1973 by EMI. Tanx was a musical departure from previous works: still containing tracks in the vein of The Slider, singer and songwriter Marc Bolan showed his interest for soul music, funk and gospel. Female backing singers appeared on a few tracks. New instruments such as mellotron were used, played by producer Tony Visconti, allowing the T. Rex sound to evolve.

Upon its release, Tanx was a commercial success. It peaked at number 4 in the UK Albums chart, number 3 in the German Albums chart and number 5 in Norway. No singles were released to promote the album.

== Background ==
Although T. Rex remained massively popular, the failure of July 1972's The Slider to hit the UK summit position, repeated when the two follow up singles "Children of the Revolution" and "Solid Gold Easy Action" were only able to climb to number two (although "Children of the Revolution" did hit number 1 on the Melody Maker and NME charts). This caused some music journalists to ponder whether Bolan's glam crown was slipping. A fall 1972 tour of the United States could not capitalize on the success of "Bang A Gong", and neither "Metal Guru" nor "The Slider" had charted there when released as singles. In addition, there was criticism that the group had slipped into a formula sound, albeit one still highly successful. These concerns prompted the group to try a different approach on their fourth album.

== Songs and recording ==
While much of the resulting album Tanx contained reliable returns to the classic T. Rex sound on tracks like "Mad Donna", "Born To Boogie" and "Country Honey", there was considerable exploration of new musical territory as well. Most of the songs for the album were penned during the sessions, with only "Darling" (the second half of "Tenement Lady") and "Mad Donna" arising from older 60s song fragments given new lyrics. The lyrical content did not depart too much from that of Electric Warrior or The Slider, with surreal Dadaist imagery like "molly mouse dream talk", "golden risks and folly's rainbows" and "slight thigh be-bop and old gumbo Jill" rubbing shoulders with familiar rock'n'roll concerns, particularly that of sex. Meanwhile, "Broken-Hearted Blues" and "Life Is Strange" returned to the confessional fragility of the ballads on The Slider. On the other hand, songs like "Mister Mister", "Country Honey" and "Shock Rock" contained only a few short, simple repeated lines, the most minimal Bolan had ever written in his career.

Musically, the album was more lushly produced, with unusual new additions such as mellotron, saxophone, phasing, and prominent piano (played by the French Elton John-soundalike Bernard Arcadio). The mellotron which opens "Tenement Lady" was played by Visconti, with more of it appearing on "Mister Mister", "The Street And Babe Shadow" and "Highway Knees". The biggest evolution in the band's sound was its embrace of gospel, soul and funk idioms, which appear on tracks like "Electric Slim" and "Left Hand Luke". While on an American tour that October, the band had appeared on stage accompanied by female soul backing singers on a few dates. Bolan recorded the closing gospel-inflected song "Left Hand Luke and the Beggar Boys", influenced by an early '60s single by R&B DJ Montague the Magnificent, with backup female vocals by Madeline Bell, Lesley Duncan, Vicki Brown, Barry St John and Sue and Sunny. They doubled Bolan on the choruses but were not credited on the sleeve. Bob Stanley of The Times described "Left Hand Luke and the Beggar Boys" as a "New Orleans bar piano song with interstellar soul". "The Street and Babe Shadow" showed Bolan adding funk to his music along with sax, while the mellotron provides a contrasting cosmic touch. In an interview a few months prior to the album's release, Bolan told a reporter "I used a lot of black chicks on it, also Lesley Duncan. I feature a pianist very heavily and play slide guitar on every track...I'm also using a couple of saxes during solos." Marc's slide guitar work can be heard on the rockers "Country Honey" and "Born to Boogie", the latter of which was also the title of the T. Rex concert film released at the end of 1972.

Sessions for the new album began at Strawberry Studios in the Château d'Hérouville, where most of The Slider had been recorded. Tony Visconti remembers the sessions as being more relaxed than that of The Slider, although tour manager Mick Grey lamented that Marc's behavior on drink and drugs had become uncontrollable by this time, the sessions marred by "his tantrums and ego." A four day block of sessions from 1–4 August 1972 yielded working versions of "Fast Blues Easy Action" (renamed 'Solid Gold Easy Action" for the single), "Children of the Revolution", "Life Is Strange", "Highway Knees", "Born to Boogie" and the B-sides "Jitterbug Love" and "Free Angel" with overdubs of "Children of the Revolution" and "Jitterbug Love" at AIR Studios on 11 and 15 August. These songs all largely still fit the classic T. Rex sound. After the fall American tour the band regrouped at Strawberry Studios from 21-25 October, inspired by what they had heard on American radio. These sessions yielded "Tenement Lady", "Rapids", "Mister Mister", "Broken Hearted Blues", "Country Honey", "Mad Donna", "The Street and Babe Shadow", "Left Hand Luke" and the final master of "Solid Gold Easy Action". The French girl's voice at the beginning of "Mad Donna" was the daughter of the head of the record label. Further overdubs and mixing occurred at AIR on 27 October and 23 November. Finally on 3 December, the group entered Toshiba Studios in Tokyo without Visconti during a Far East tour to record "20th Century Boy", "Electric Slim and the Factory Hen" and "Shock Rock" (with working title "Street Back"). A master tape of the album compiled on December 31 featured "20th Century Boy" as its closer, but was changed on 8 January to remove it from the album, meaning that no singles appeared on Tanx.

== Album cover ==
The overall design and packaging of the album was credited to noted graphic designer John Kosh, with a tank theme inspired by the pun of the album's title. The black-and-white front cover taken by Peter Howe featured Bolan, dressed in a feather boa, angrily straddling a toy tank whose gun-barrel is suggestively pointed at the viewer; some critics noted that the photo made the star look bloated. A free black-and-white poster which came with the album featured a similar pose, only with Bolan in a different outfit and more demure expression. The back cover featured pictures of the band, live and backstage, taken by Mike Putland alternating with neon red and blue tank illustrations while the inner sleeve had a turquoise background consisting of black-and-white tank graphics; it was the first Bolan album to contain no lyric sheet.

== Release ==
Tanx was released on 16 March 1973 by record label EMI in the UK and Reprise in the US. Tanx was a top 4 hit in the UK Albums Chart (actually reaching number 1 on the Melody Maker chart) and a hit all over Europe, peaking at number 3 in Germany, number 5 in Norway, number 15 in Sweden, and number 20 in Finland, but it failed to match the success of The Slider in the US, reaching only number 102 in the Billboard 200. Curiously, the popular single "20th Century Boy" recorded during a stay in Japan, and released two weeks before, on 2 March 1973, was not included on the album, which may have affected sales, as the album (unlike its two predecessors) did not include any single.

Tanx received numerous remasters on CD, beginning in 1985 on Bolan's record label Marc On Wax. This first reissue came with all of T. Rex's non-album singles and B-Sides released in 1973 as well as the tracks released under the Big Carrot moniker. Edsel Records re-released the album in 1994 as part of their extensive T. Rex reissue campaign with a different set of bonus tracks. A companion release, entitled Left Hand Luke (The Alternative Tanx), was released in 1995 and contained alternative versions, studio rough mixes and demos of the main album and bonus tracks. A combined album digipak was released in 2002. In 2003, further recordings from the Tanx sessions were released by Thunderwing Productions Limited (TPL), the owners of several original ¼", 1" and 2" Master Tape recordings of Marc Bolan & T. Rex. These tracks were released as The Tanx Recordings.

== Reception ==
Professional ratings
Review scores
Source	Rating
AllMusic	4.5/5 stars
Creem	favourable
New Musical Express	2.5/5 stars
Pitchfork	8.3/10
PopMatters	7/10
Rolling Stone	unfavourable
The Quietus	favourable

At the time, Tanx received favourable reviews in both the NME and Record Mirror. James Johnson of NME wrote "it's the calmer, more relaxed" tracks like "Electric Slim and the Factory Hen" that were most palatable. Val Mabbs at Record Mirror found the lyrics simplistic but noted that the album was "musically the most interesting from T. Rex to date and features mellotron very strongly, as well as some beautifully arranged saxophone sounds and piano work". Penny Valentine at Sounds thought the tracks "probably stand up better than most of the stuff he's done over the past couple of years" and claimed Bolan was "obviously back to strong lyrics", once again singling out "Electric Slim". Creem hailed it saying, "song for song, this might be Marc Bolan's strongest album. Certainly, it's the most varied, and the most musical". However, it was derided by Rolling Stone: reviewer Paul Gambaccini wrote "This one album might have made a good EP [...] I can't see many people being truly pleased with it. But I've been wrong before." He nevertheless praised tracks like "Mister Mister," "Electric Slim and the Factory Hen," and "Broken Hearted Blues."

Retrospective reviews have been more favourable. Whitney Strub of PopMatters wrote "One reason for Tanx's commercial failure was its lack of the immediacy for which glam was known. [...] But what doomed the album on the charts is precisely what earns it reinspection today: the songs, for the most part, flow cohesively from one fractured mini-narrative to the next". Stephen M. Deusner of Pitchfork, whilst praising the record, called it "a difficult album". The Quietus wrote "It's an excessive record in the best possible sense", qualifying "Tenement Lady" as a stunning opener. Neil Kulkarni considered that "Electric Slim & The Factory Hen" was a nod to black soul music, a style that Bolan had always wanted to explore: Kulkarni wrote that this was two years before David Bowie "tried the same move on Young Americans".

== Legacy ==
AllMusic wrote that it presaged David Bowie's soul music phase: "It was admirable that Bolan was attempting to broaden the T. Rex sound -- soulful backup singers and horns are heard throughout, a full two years before David Bowie used the same formula for his mega-seller Young Americans".

Tanx inspired Britpop band Suede for their 1996 album Coming Up, as producer Ed Buller related: "The blueprint was Tanx by T. Rex – I actually thought The Slider was a better choice, but Brett (Anderson) always had a different take on things. I always looked at The Slider as being the ultimate T. Rex album, but he’s right, Tanx is actually a better record, because it’s more interesting. Basically, what we did, is that every track started with acoustic guitar, bongos, tambourine and Brett, so it all started life pretty much the same way that Marc Bolan recorded all of his stuff originally. He started with an acoustic guitar song and then he’d build it up with guitar and drums and electronics. So the foundation of the songs on Coming Up, is a groove made-up out of congas, tambourine and acoustic guitar." In 2003, Martin Gore from Depeche Mode recorded in solo two covers from Tanx as extra-tracks of his single "Stardust": "Left Hand Luke and the Beggar Boys", and "Life Is Strange".

The song "Life Is Strange" was the soundtrack of several scenes of the film Dallas Buyers Club in 2013 in which one of the main characters, Rayon, a trans woman played by Jared Leto, is a big Marc Bolan fan and lives surrounded by pictures of her idol.

== Track listing ==
All tracks are written by Marc Bolan.

Side A
No.	Title	Length
1.	"Tenement Lady"	2:55
2.	"Rapids"	2:48
3.	"Mister Mister"	3:29
4.	"Broken Hearted Blues"	2:02
5.	"Shock Rock"	1:43
6.	"Country Honey"	1:47
7.	"Electric Slim and the Factory Hen"	3:03

Side B
No.	Title	Length
1.	"Mad Donna"	2:16
2.	"Born to Boogie"	2:04
3.	"Life Is Strange"	2:30
4.	"The Street and Babe Shadow"	2:18
5.	"Highway Knees"	2:34
6.	"Left Hand Luke and the Beggar Boys"	5:18

1994 CD reissue bonus tracks
No.	Title	Length
14.	"Children of the Revolution"	2:30
15.	"Jitterbug Love"	2:59
16.	"Sunken Rags"	2:54
17.	"Solid Gold Easy Action"	2:20
18.	"Xmas Riff"	0:11
19.	"20th Century Boy"	3:41
20.	"Free Angel"	2:12

Left Hand Luke (The Alternative Tanx)
No.	Title	Length
1.	"Tenement Lady / Darling"	2:49
2.	"Rapids"	1:59
3.	"Mister Mister"	2:49
4.	"Broken Hearted Blues"	2:08
5.	"Country Honey"	1:50
6.	"Mad Donna"	2:19
7.	"Born to Boogie"	2:09
8.	"Life Is Strange"	1:47
9.	"The Street and Babe Shadow"	2:20
10.	"Highway Knees"	2:32
11.	"Left Hand Luke"	5:17
12.	"Children of the Revolution"	1:04
13.	"Solid Gold Easy Action"	2:13
14.	"Free Angel"	2:14
15.	"Mister Mister" (Acoustic and Bass Demo)	3:32
16.	"Broken Hearted Blues" (Acoustic and Bass Demo)	2:08
17.	"The Street and the Babe Shadow"	2:14
18.	"Tenement Lady" (Acoustic and Bass Demo)	1:35
19.	"Tenement Lady" (Acoustic Demo)	1:53
20.	"Broken Hearted Blues" (Acoustic Demo)	1:50
21.	"Mad Donna" (Different Lyrics / Acoustic Demo)	1:45
22.	"The Street and the Babe Shadow" (Acoustic Demo)	2:36
23.	"Left Hand Luke" (Acoustic Demo)	1:58

The Tanx Recordings
No.	Title	Length
1.	"Tenement Lady"	3:18
2.	"Darling"	1:46
3.	"Rapids"	4:39
4.	"Mister Mister"	3:31
5.	"Broken Hearted Blues"	2:16
6.	"Shock Rock"	2:36
7.	"Country Honey"	2:06
8.	"Electric Slim & the Factory Hen"	3:16
9.	"Mad Donna"	4:10
10.	"Born to Boogie"	2:10
11.	"Life Is Strange"	2:39
12.	"The Street & Babe Shadow"	2:17
13.	"Highway Knees"	2:35
14.	"Left Hand Luke"	5:26
15.	"Children of the Revolution"	3:32
16.	"Jitterbug Love"	3:59
17.	"Solid Gold Easy Action"	3:31
18.	"20th Century Boy"	3:57
19.	"Free Angel"	2:21

== Personnel ==
T. Rex

- Marc Bolan – vocals, guitar
- Mickey Finn – conga, hand percussion, vocals
- Steve Currie – bass
- Bill Legend – drums

with:

- Tony Visconti – mellotron, string arrangements, backing vocals, recorder, producer
- Howard Casey – saxophone

Technical

- John Kosh – cover design
- Peter Howe – front cover photography

== Charts ==
=== Weekly charts ===
Chart (1973)	Peak position
Australia (Kent Music Report)	21
UK Albums Chart	4
United States (Billboard 200)	102

=== Year-end charts ===
Chart (1973)	Position
German Albums (Offizielle Top 100)	21
