= 20th Century Boy =

1973 music single by T. Rex

- Picture sleeve from Germany

Single by T. Rex
- B-side: "Free Angel"
- Released: 2 March 1973
- Genre: Glam rock; hard rock; glam punk; rock and roll
- Length: 3:39
- Label: T. REX (UK); Ariola (Germany)
- Songwriter: Marc Bolan
- Producer: Tony Visconti

T. Rex singles chronology
"Solid Gold Easy Action" (1972)	"20th Century Boy" (1973)	"The Groover" (1973)

"20th Century Boy" is a song by English rock band T. Rex, written by Marc Bolan, released as a stand-alone single on 2 March 1973.

Although at first considered as its closing track, "20th Century Boy" was not featured on the album Tanx, released at the same time in early March. It was later added as a bonus track on the 1985 reissue of Tanx and on all versions released since.

== Recording ==
=== "20th Century Boy" ===
"20th Century Boy" was recorded on 3 December 1972 in Toshiba Recording Studios in Tokyo, Japan at a session that ran between 3:00 p.m. and 1:30 a.m. For possibly the first time, producer Tony Visconti was not present at a T. Rex session, with Marc and Mick O'Halloran assuming the role. Despite this, Visconti is still officially credited with production. Backing vocals, hand claps, acoustic guitar and saxophones were recorded in England when T. Rex returned to the country after their tour.

The single version of the track fades out at three minutes and 39 seconds; however, the multi-track master reveals that the song ended in nearly a full three minutes' worth of jamming. A rough mix of the full-length version can be found on the Bump 'n' Grind compilation.

According to Marc Bolan, the lyrics are based on quotes taken from notable celebrities such as Muhammad Ali. This can be seen through the inclusion of the line "sting like a bee", which is taken from one of Ali's 1969 speeches.

=== "Free Angel" ===
"Free Angel" was recorded during the first sessions for the Tanx album, between 1 and 4 August 1972. The single was mixed for release at Air Studios on 16 December 1972.

== Release and reception ==
"20th Century Boy" was released on 2 March 1973. It entered the UK Singles Chart at number 3 on 10 March 1973 and peaked three weeks in a row at that position. It stayed a total of nine weeks in the UK Chart while topping the charts in Ireland, although like most T. Rex singles it failed to chart in the US.

The song was met with a warm reception in Bolan's home country, where Chris Welch of Melody Maker noted that "guitars tremble, Marc howls, and it's 'gang awa' with another in his series of rhythmic entertainments". Charles Shaar Murray of NME thought it was the group's best since "Telegram Sam" with "Marc's thunder guitar majestically assaulting you." Peter Jones at Record Mirror wrote that it was "very, very good indeed" and predicted it would top the charts. However, Penny Valentine at Sounds, who had praised earlier T. Rex hits, now lamented that Bolan "hadn't extended his musical capabilities as far as he might have done."

The song returned to the UK Top 20 in 1991, peaking at number 13, after being used in a TV commercial for Levi's starring Brad Pitt. A version of the song by British rockabilly band The Big Six was used in The Truman Show in 1998. The song was also used in the opening of the 2016 film The Purge: Election Year, it also is the name of Magent Magent's Stand in Steel Ball Run, seventh part of the manga JoJo's Bizarre Adventure by Hirohiko Araki, and it is the namesake of the manga series 20th Century Boys by Naoki Urasawa.

== Track listing ==
1. "20th Century Boy" - 3:39
2. "Free Angel" - 2:14

== Charts ==
Chart (1973)	Peak position
Australia (Kent Music Report)	57
Ireland (IRMA)	1
Norway (VG-lista)	9
Spain (AFE)	28
UK Singles (Official Charts)	3
West Germany (GfK)	8

Chart (1991–1992)	Peak position
Denmark (IFPI)	5
Finland (Suomen virallinen lista)	13
Ireland (IRMA)	8
Luxembourg (Radio Luxembourg)	5
New Zealand (Recorded Music NZ)	9
Sweden (Sverigetopplistan)	39
Switzerland (Schweizer Hitparade)	27
UK Singles (Official Charts)	13
UK Airplay (Music Week)	12

== Certifications ==
Region	Certification	Certified units/sales
United Kingdom (BPI)	Silver	200,000^{‡}
^{‡} Sales+streaming figures based on certification alone.

== Covers and renditions ==
=== Siouxsie and the Banshees version ===
British post-punk band Siouxsie and the Banshees recorded a version of the song as the B-side to their single The Staircase (Mystery), released 23 March 1979.

Chart (1979)	Peak position
UK Singles (OCC)	8

=== Girlschool version ===
In 1983, British rock band Girlschool recorded the song for their fourth studio album, Play Dirty, and it was released by Bronze Records as the album's lead single in October 1983. Girlschool's version was produced by Jim Lea and Noddy Holder of Slade.

Chart (1983)	Peak position
UK Heavy Metal Singles (MRIB)	8

=== Chalk Circle version ===
Canadian rock band Chalk Circle covered "20th Century Boy" in 1987.

Chart (1987)	Peak position
Canada (Cancon)	9
Canada Top Singles (RPM)	44

=== Def Leppard version ===
"20th Century Boy"

Single by Def Leppard

from the album Yeah!
- Released: 2006
- Label: Mercury
- Songwriter: Marc Bolan
- Producer: Def Leppard

Def Leppard singles chronology
"Rock On" (2006)	"20th Century Boy" (2006)	"Nine Lives" (2008)

English hard rock band Def Leppard covered the song on their 2006 album, Yeah!, which features cover versions of 1970s rock hits. It was released as the third and final single from the album, on 21 August 2006. The band used the song extensively as promotion for including two TV appearances and a regular rotation in the setlist of their 2006 Yeah! Tour. Def Leppard performed "20th Century Boy" on The Tonight Show with Jay Leno on 23 May 2006 two days before performing the song with Queen's Brian May on VH1 Rock Honors broadcast on 31 May.

=== Placebo version ===
British alternative rock band Placebo covered "20th Century Boy" for the soundtrack of Todd Haynes' 1998 film Velvet Goldmine, in which the band members appear as a fictional glam rock band within the film. The song is included on their 2003 compilation album, Covers.
