= List of number-one hits of 1972 (Germany) =

This is a list of the German Media Control Top100 Singles Chart number-ones of 1972.

Issue date	Song	Artist
7 January	"Mamy Blue"	Pop Tops
14 January	"(Is This the Way to) Amarillo?"	Tony Christie
21 January	"Du lebst in deiner Welt (Highlights of My Dream)"	Daisy Door
28 January	"Du lebst in deiner Welt (Highlights of My Dream)"	Daisy Door
4 February	"Du lebst in deiner Welt (Highlights of My Dream)"	Daisy Door
11 February	"Du lebst in deiner Welt (Highlights of My Dream)"	Daisy Door
18 February	"Sacramento"	Middle of the Road
25 February	"Sacramento"	Middle of the Road
3 March	"Komm, gib mir deine Hand"	Tony Marshall
10 March	"Sacramento"	Middle of the Road
17 March	"Komm gib mir deine Hand"	Tony Marshall
24 March	"How Do You Do"	Die Windows
31 March	"How Do You Do"	Die Windows
7 April	"How Do You Do"	Die Windows
14 April	"How Do You Do"	Die Windows
21 April	"How Do You Do"	Die Windows
28 April	"How Do You Do"	Die Windows
5 May	"How Do You Do"	Die Windows
12 May	"How Do You Do"	Die Windows
19 May	"Am Tag, als Conny Kramer starb"	Juliane Werding
26 May	"Beautiful Sunday"	Daniel Boone
2 June	"Es fährt ein Zug nach Nirgendwo"	Christian Anders
9 June	"Beautiful Sunday"	Daniel Boone
16 June	"Beautiful Sunday"	Daniel Boone
23 June	"Beautiful Sunday"	Daniel Boone
30 June	"Beautiful Sunday"	Daniel Boone
7 July	"Es fährt ein Zug nach Nirgendwo"	Christian Anders
14 July	"Michaela"	Bata Illic
21 July	"Metal Guru"	T.Rex
28 July	"Michaela"	Bata Illic
4 August	"Hello-A"	Mouth & MacNeal
11 August	"Little Willy"	The Sweet
18 August	"Hello-A"	Mouth & MacNeal
25 August	"Hello-A"	Mouth & MacNeal
1 September	"Hello-A"	Mouth & MacNeal
8 September	"Hello-A"	Mouth & MacNeal
15 September	"Hello-A"	Mouth & MacNeal
22 September	"Hello-A"	Mouth & MacNeal
29 September	"Hello-A"	Mouth & MacNeal
6 October	"Popcorn"	Hot Butter
13 October	"Popcorn"	Hot Butter
20 October	"Popcorn"	Hot Butter
27 October	"Wig-Wam Bam"	The Sweet
3 November	"Wig-Wam Bam"	The Sweet
10 November	"Wig-Wam Bam"	The Sweet
17 November	"Wig-Wam Bam"	The Sweet
24 November	"Wig-Wam Bam"	The Sweet
1 December	"Wig-Wam Bam"	The Sweet
8 December	"Wig-Wam Bam"	The Sweet
15 December	"Wig-Wam Bam"	The Sweet
22 December	"Ich wünsch' mir 'ne kleine Miezekatze"	Wums Gesang
29 December	"Ich wünsch' mir 'ne kleine Miezekatze"	Wums Gesang

== See also ==
- List of number-one hits (Germany)
