= The Slider =

Studio album by T. Rex
- Released: 21 July 1972
- Recorded: March–April 1972
- Studios: Rosenberg, Copenhagen; Château d'Hérouville, Paris; Elektra, Los Angeles
- Genres: Glam rock; power pop
- Length: 43:05
- Labels: T. REX (UK); Reprise (US)
- Producer: Tony Visconti

T. Rex chronology
Electric Warrior (1971)	The Slider (1972)	Tanx (1973)

Singles from The Slider
- 1. "Telegram Sam" Released: 21 January 1972; 2. "Metal Guru" Released: 5 May 1972

The Slider is the seventh studio album by English rock band T. Rex, and the third since abbreviating their name from Tyrannosaurus Rex. It was released on 21 July 1972 by record labels EMI and Reprise. Two number-one singles, "Telegram Sam" and "Metal Guru", were released to promote the album. Issued at the height of the band's popularity, The Slider received acclaim from critics, reaching number 4 in the UK Albums Chart and number 17 in the US.

== Background ==
At the start of 1972, T. Rex was riding a wave of superstardom propelled by four successive top 3 hits (including two number ones) and an 8-week run at the summit of the UK charts for Electric Warrior, which became that country's best-selling album of 1971. Fan hysteria at concerts was dubbed "T. Rextasy" by the press, and "Get It On" hit number 10 in America. Bolan had just left his old label Fly Records and formed T. Rex Wax Co., distributed by EMI, for his records. The first single released under the T. Rex Wax Co. imprint, "Telegram Sam", became the band's third number 1 hit upon release on 21 January 1972. It was under these auspicious circumstances that the songs which would comprise The Slider were written and recorded.

== Songs and recording ==
Most of the songs for The Slider were written and demoed in the fall and winter of 1971, as the group toured the UK. Bolan claimed in interviews that the new album was his Imagine, in that in it he felt he had been frank and truthful about himself. Among the highlights was the opening track "Metal Guru", which Bolan described as a "festival of life song" where he related "Metal Guru" to "all gods around... someone special, a godhead. I thought how god would be, he'd be all alone without a telephone". Other tracks like the acoustic ballads "Spaceball Ricochet" and "Main Man" expressed a vulnerable fragility addressed to his fans, while the chugging boogie of the title track contained the revealing refrain "and when I'm sad, I slide".

Musically, outside of the ballads, the album was harder rocking than Electric Warrior, featuring several heavy metal-influenced songs like "Buick MacKane" and "Chariot Choogle" that Bolan cheekily labeled "Zep Rex", along with a further use of elaborate studio techniques (phasing, reverb, backwards guitars etc.) to achieve a glam rock sound. As on Warrior, Tony Visconti provided string arrangements while Flo & Eddie contributed androgynous backing vocals (although Visconti later claimed they sang on only three tracks, with he and Marc doing their best Flo & Eddie impersonation on the rest).

The first sessions for the album were held 1–3 November 1971 at Rosenberg Studios in Copenhagen, with Visconti producing. "Telegram Sam" and the B-sides "Baby Strange" (also to appear on the album), "Cadilac" (sic) and "Thunderwing" were all recorded along with an early version of "Spaceball Ricochet". On 15 November, overdubs and mixing took place at Trident Studios, where most of Bolan's early albums had been recorded.

On the recommendation of Elton John, the bulk of The Slider was recorded outside of Paris at Strawberry Studios in Château d'Hérouville to avoid British taxing laws. According to Visconti, the pressure to create another blockbuster record was huge. Production there began on 3 February 1972 with the recording of "Ballrooms of Mars" and overdubs to "Thunderwing". After a short tour of the United States, sessions reconvened at Strawberry Studios during 8–12 March, where backing tracks for "The Slider", "Rock On", "Metal Guru", "Mystic Lady", "Spaceball Ricochet" (remake), "Rabbit Fighter" and "Main Man" were laid down along with the B-sides "Lady" and "Sunken Rags" plus an outtake later titled "Buick MacKane and the Babe Shadow" on archival releases. Visconti recalls that Bolan was beginning to drink and use cocaine at this time, which affected his personality during the sessions. In spite of this, the recordings went quickly and efficiently, in contrast to the months-long process of recording Electric Warrior. Visconti remembers the happiest times making the record being late-night parties in the studio when "the French wine would kick in and we'd listen to the playback of the songs we'd done that day. We'd run around the building, having a ball. That was the fun part. It was worth all the stress to hear that these tracks were... scintillating".

Further recording was done from 31 March to 2 April back at Rosenberg Studios. These sessions produced "Buick MacKane", "Baby Boomerang" and "Chariot Choogle" along with a 12-minute rehearsal of new song "Children of the Revolution", with a note "For Ringo" on the tape box sheet as the song was to be used in the T. Rex concert film Born to Boogie directed by Starr that spring. Finally, backing vocals by Flo & Eddie were overdubbed at Elektra Sound Recorders in Los Angeles, along with further overdubbing and final mixing, in early April.

== Album cover ==
The album notes credit Ringo Starr with the front and back cover photographs. The photographs were taken the same day that Starr was filming the T. Rex documentary Born to Boogie at John Lennon's estate, Tittenhurst Park. Producer Tony Visconti, however, disputes that Starr took the photograph, stating "Marc [Bolan] handed me his motorized Nikon and asked me to fire off two rolls of black and white film while we were on the set of Born to Boogie. Ringo, the director of the film, was busy all day lining up shots. But Marc apparently saw a photo credit opportunity and gave Ringo the credit for the photos". The unique grainy composition of the black and white image had been unintentionally produced due to the mishandling of the exposure chemicals used to produce the picture by a darkroom technician eager to see the photos.

Although Guns N' Roses later covered "Buick MacKane", the front cover was not an influence on the top hat worn by GNR guitarist Slash. "People always ask me that because of the Slider cover," he remarked. "But, no, that had nothing to do with it".

== Release ==
Two singles were released to promote The Slider. The first was "Telegram Sam" which was released January 1972 and charted in the United Kingdom for twelve weeks, peaking at number 1. "Telegram Sam" also charted in the United States and peaked at 67 on the Pop Singles chart. The second single "Metal Guru" was released in May 1972 and charted in the United Kingdom for fourteen weeks, giving the group its fourth number 1. However, it did not chart in the United States.

The Slider was released on 21 July 1972 by record labels EMI in the UK and Reprise in the US. T. Rextasy was at a fever pitch in Britain at the time, where the album reportedly sold 100,000 copies in its first four days. However, after entering the UK Albums Chart on 5 August 1972 it only peaked at number 4 and stayed on the chart for 18 weeks, as opposed to 44 weeks for the chart-topping Electric Warrior. Part of the cause may have been severe overexposure of the band in their home country, where in the four months prior to its release the market had been flooded with an avalanche of reissued Bolan product, including the greatest hits set Bolan Boogie and a double album repackaging of the first two Tyrannosaurus Rex albums, both of which flew to number 1 in succession that spring yet likely took from sales of The Slider.

In the United States, where the album was promoted upon release with a television commercial featuring the band miming to "Chariot Choogle", it peaked at number 17 on the Billboard 200 chart, becoming their highest charting album in that country.

=== Reissues ===
The Slider was reissued in the UK in 1985 on the Marc On Wax label. All non-album tracks released in 1972 were included on a bonus disc (bonus tracks on the CD version). A Japanese CD release on SMS records dating to 1986 uses the same track list but a different mastering. Later CD releases on Teldec and Relativity omitted the bonus tracks. The Slider was remastered again for CD by Edsel Records in 1994 as part of their extensive T. Rex reissue campaign and a number of different bonus tracks were appended. A companion release, entitled Rabbit Fighter (The Alternate Slider), was released in 1995 and contained alternative versions and radio sessions of the main album and bonus tracks. A combined CD digipak of these releases was issued in 2002. Also in 2002, further recordings from the Slider sessions were released by Thunderwing Productions Limited (TPL), the owners of several original ¼", 1" and 2" Master Tape recordings of Marc Bolan and T. Rex. These tracks were released as The Slider Recordings. In 2010, The Slider was remastered and reissued by Fat Possum Records. The remastering was done by Chicago Mastering.

In 2012, the 40th Anniversary re-issue came out, a new remaster by producer Visconti, including B-sides, outtakes and an unheard demo of the title track taken from Visconti's private collection. The set contained two CDs and a 180g pressing of the newly remastered album. In addition the three singles also got vinyl pressings. A DVD was also included with a 105-minute interview with Visconti along with archive interview clips and TV footage.

== Reception ==
Professional ratings
Review scores
Source	Rating
AllMusic	5/5 stars
Consequence of Sound	4/5 stars
New Musical Express	4/5 stars
PopMatters	7/10 stars
Pitchfork	9.8/10 (2006); 9.5/10 (2019)

In the United Kingdom, the album received mixed reviews. Richard Williams of The Times reviewed the album alongside Rod Stewart's Never A Dull Moment, David Bowie's The Rise and Fall of Ziggy Stardust and the Spiders from Mars and Roxy Music's Roxy Music. Williams found Bolan to be "the least obviously talented". However, he further noted that the "narrow range and musical repetitiousness" of the music did not matter as it made "his records immediately recognizable on the radio" and that the album "is full of songs of a slightness which is wondrous to behold. But the hushed intimacy of Bolan's vocal delivery helps to make one word do the work of ten — particularly when combined with his gift of coining oddly appealing images". Williams also praised the work of Tony Visconti, declaring "I'm inclined to think that it's Visconti more than anyone who's responsible for Bolan's success; his arrangements and production give T. Rex's work a quality which the group's leader could never have achieved alone". Michael Oldfield at Melody Maker enthused that Bolan had "produced an album in which the winning formula is jiggled around enough to make a thoroughly enjoyable, and exceptionally good, album" while Penny Valentine at Sounds stated approvingly that "each track is a solid piece of chart appeal...many of which could be whipped off as a single at any time" although she described the lyrics as "frugal repetitive", being simply a series of images and twists. Disc & Music Echo complimented "Spaceball Ricochet" as the best number but noted that others are "of the usual heavy bass type, although they aren't as strong as the singles' tracks".

In America, the response was similarly varied. Ben Edmonds of Creem felt that after "Telegram Sam" and "Metal Guru" "there isn't another single on the album". Edmonds found the album "kind of bumps along from track to track [...] The rest of the material is nice but kinda lackluster, and Bolan isn't helped much by a terribly ordinary rhythm section and Mickey Finn's non-existent percussion. If you aren't already a T. Rex fanatic, then The Slider isn't going to do very much about making you one". Loraine Alterman of The New York Times commented that the lyrics would "undoubtedly sound quite profound to 14-year-old ears" and that "it's a long, long way from Bolan's 'Ballrooms of Mars' to Yeats' 'Byzantium'", yet conceded that "even to ears successfully past puberty, Mr. Bolan does have a certain fey charm that in the end defies analysis". Conversely, Cashbox simply effused "Will this lad ever tire of penning cosmic love songs? We hope not."

Retrospective reviews have been more consistently positive, often labeling the album a glam classic. Steve Huey of AllMusic wrote, "Even if it treads largely the same ground as Electric Warrior, The Slider is flawlessly executed and every bit the classic that its predecessor is". Andy Beta of Pitchfork gave the album a 9.5/10 grade, opining that the album "marked both the zenith and imminent approach of the cliff's edge for T. Rextasy. Recorded in a dilapidated castle in France, it captured Marc Bolan as the King of Glam at the absolute height of his powers". LA Weekly praised the album as "a hauntingly unique masterpiece."

== Legacy ==
Johnny Marr of the Smiths cited it as one of his favourite albums, saying: "The Slider came out and it had 'Metal Guru' on it. It was a song that changed my life as I had never heard anything so beautiful and so strange, but yet so catchy. 'Telegram Sam' was also on that album and the whole thing was unusually spooky and had a weird atmosphere, considering it was a number one record and they were essentially a teenybop band". Gary Numan also hailed it among his favourites: "Song after song after song... and the title track; it's a not typical album-title track. You'd normally go for one of the big singles and The Sliders got a very slow, lazy groove thing. It's just great. It's just the sexiest track".

"Ballrooms of Mars" was featured in the 2003 comedy film School of Rock, and was used as the opening theme of the Spanish TV series Punta Escarlata. "Ballrooms of Mars" also appeared in the 2013 film Dallas Buyers Club. The lyrics of the song "Baby Boomerang" became a plot element in a 1973 episode of Cannon, "The Hard Rock Roller Coaster".

For their 1993 cover album The Spaghetti Incident?, Guns N' Roses recorded a version of "Buick MacKane" as part of a medley with Soundgarden's "Big Dumb Sex". Guitarist Gilby Clarke also wore a T.Rex T-shirt in the "Estranged" music video.

On 4 May 2022, the Black Crowes released a studio version of "The Slider" on their album 1972 (EP).

== Track listing ==
All tracks are written by Marc Bolan.

Side A
No.	Title	Length
1.	"Metal Guru"	2:25
2.	"Mystic Lady"	3:09
3.	"Rock On"	3:26
4.	"The Slider"	3:22
5.	"Baby Boomerang"	2:17
6.	"Spaceball Ricochet"	3:37
7.	"Buick MacKane"	3:31
Total length:		21:57

Side B
No.	Title	Length
1.	"Telegram Sam"	3:42
2.	"Rabbit Fighter"	3:55
3.	"Baby Strange"	3:03
4.	"Ballrooms of Mars"	4:09
5.	"Chariot Choogle"	2:45
6.	"Main Man"	4:14
Total length:		21:08

Marc On Wax/SMS bonus tracks
No.	Title	Length
14.	"Thunderwing"	3:44
15.	"Lady"	2:10
16.	"Children of the Revolution"	2:27
17.	"Jitterbug Love"	2:52
18.	"Sunken Rags"	2:49
19.	"Solid Gold Easy Action"	2:16
20.	"Cadilac"	3:48

Code 90 bonus tracks
No.	Title	Length
14.	"Cadilac"	3:53
15.	"Thunderwing"	3:46
16.	"Lady"	2:12

Rhino bonus tracks
No.	Title	Length
14.	"Cadilac"	3:53
15.	"Thunderwing"	3:46
16.	"Lady"	2:12
17.	"Metal Guru"	2:32
18.	"Mystic Lady"	3:22
19.	"Rock On"	3:37
20.	"The Slider"	3:28
21.	"Thunderwing"	2:58
22.	"Spaceball Ricochet"	3:43
23.	"Buick McCane"	3:49
24.	"Telegram Sam"	2:30
25.	"Rabbit Fighter"	4:02
26.	"Baby Strange"	3:00
27.	"Ballrooms of Mars"	4:13
28.	"Cadilac"	3:31
29.	"Main Man"	6:06
30.	"Lady"	2:01
31.	"Sunken Rags"	3:59

Thunderwing bonus tracks
No.	Title	Length
14.	"Cadilac"	4:13
15.	"Thunderwing"	3:51
16.	"Lady"	5:03
17.	"Sunken Rags"	4:04

40th Anniversary bonus tracks
No.	Title	Length
1.	"Cadilac"	4:13
2.	"Thunderwing"	3:51
3.	"Lady"	5:03
4.	"Rock On" (Outtake)	3:34
5.	"The Slider" (Acoustic Outtake)	3:28
6.	"Buick McCane" (Outtake)	3:49
7.	"Sugar Baby (Rabbit Fighter)"	3:49
8.	"Baby Strange" (Incomplete)	3:12
9.	"Slider Blues" (Home Demo)	3:58
10.	"Buick Mackane II" (Outtake)	5:13
11.	"Baby Strange" (Outtake)	4:10
12.	"Ballrooms of Mars" (Outtake)	4:10
13.	"The Slider" (Acoustic demo)	3:46
14.	"Radio Interview, 26 August 1972"	14:33
15.	"Telegram Sam" (DVD disc: Top of the Pops, 19 January 1972)
16.	"Metal Guru" (DVD disc: Top of the Pops, 24 May 1972)
17.	"Metal Guru" (DVD disc: Christmas Top of the Pops, 21 December 1972)
18.	"Cadillac" (DVD disc: Music in the Round, 8 December 1971)
19.	"Spaceball Ricochet" (DVD disc: Music in the Round, 8 December 1971)
20.	"Telegram Sam" (DVD disc: Music in the Round, 8 December 1971)
21.	"Marc Bolan Interviewed by Russell Harty" (DVD disc: Eleven Plus, 23 July 1972)

== Personnel ==
T. Rex

- Marc Bolan – vocals, guitar
- Steve Currie – bass guitar
- Mickey Finn – percussion, vocals
- Bill Legend – drums

with:

- Mark Volman ("Flo") – background vocals
- Howard Kaylan ("Eddie") – background vocals
- Tony Visconti – string arrangements, background vocals

Technical

- Tony Visconti – producer
- Ringo Starr – sleeve photography
- Dominique Freddy Hansson – engineering
- David Katz – orchestra master
- Mick O'Halloran – Front of house Technician/ Lead road manager
- Steve Little – Stage Manager/ PA to Marc/Roadie
- Micky Marmalade – Roadie/Driver

== Charts ==
=== Weekly charts ===
Chart (1972)	Peak position
Australia (Kent Music Report)	13
UK Albums Chart	4
United States (Billboard 200)	17

=== Year-end charts ===
Chart (1972)	Position
German Albums (Offizielle Top 100)	48
Chart (1973)	Position
German Albums (Offizielle Top 100)	44
