= Lookin' Through the Windows (song) =

Single by The Jackson 5

from the album Lookin' Through the Windows
- B-side: "Love Song"
- Released: June 23, 1972
- Genre: Pop, soul, R&B
- Length: 3:44
- Label: Motown
- Songwriter: Clifton Davis
- Producer: Hal Davis

The Jackson 5 singles chronology
"Little Bitty Pretty One" (1972)	"Lookin' Through the Windows" (1972)	"Corner of the Sky" (1972)

"Lookin' Through the Windows" is a song written by Clifton Davis released by the Jackson 5 in 1972. It is the title track and second single from the album Lookin' Through the Windows. Produced by Hal Davis, it peaked at No. 16 on the Billboard Hot 100.

== Charts ==
Chart (1972)	Peak position
U.S. Billboard Hot 100	16
U.S. Billboard Best Selling Soul Singles	5

Lookin' Through The Window/Love Song Japan Vinilo, 7", 45 RPM, Single
No.	Title	Writer(s)	Length
1.	"Lookin' Through the Windows"	(Clifton Davis)	2:30
2.	"Love Song"	(The Corporation)	3:23

Lookin Through The Windows / The Wall
No.	Title	Writer(s)	Length
1.	"Lookin' Through the Windows"	(Clifton Davis)	2:30
