= Blackfoot Sue =

British pop band

Blackfoot Sue was a British pop / rock band from Birmingham, formed in 1970 by twin brothers Tom and David Farmer and Eddie Golga. A single released in August 1972, "Standing in the Road" on the Jam label No. JAM 13, reached number 4 on the UK Singles Chart. Lack of further tangible success left them labelled as one-hit wonders. However, they did have another record enter the UK Singles Chart. "Sing Don't Speak" reached number 36 in December 1972. In November 1972, they appeared on the German television programme, Disco. Further unsuccessful singles appeared on the DJM Records and MCA labels. According to AllMusic, "they were written off as a teen sensation and broke up in 1977".

== Band members ==
- Tom Farmer (born Thomas Laurence Farmer, 2 March 1952, Birmingham, England – bass, keyboards, vocals
- Dave Farmer (born David Anthony Farmer, 2 March 1952, Birmingham, England) – drums
- Eddie Golga (born Edward John Gogla, 4 September 1951, Birmingham, England) – guitar, keyboards
- Alan Jones (born Alan Douglas Jones, 5 January 1950, Birmingham, England) – guitar, vocals

== Later incarnations ==
The band stopped performing live in 1977, but under the name Liner recorded a studio album, Liner, in 1979. Released on Atlantic Records and produced by Arif Mardin, it was recorded in both the UK and the U.S., using session musicians from both sides of the Atlantic, including Mel Collins, Dick Morrissey, Frank Vicari and Ronnie Cuber on saxophones; plus Cissy Houston, Maretha Stewart and Beverly Ingram on background vocals. The group scored two Top 50 hits, "Keep Reaching Out For Love" and "You And Me", both released on black vinyl and as picture discs, and the latter was also a minor US hit. The fourth member of the original band, Alan Jones, later emigrated to Sydney, Australia.

By 1984, they had formed as a trio, Outside Edge, recording a further four albums under that name.

In 1993, the band reinvented themselves as Blackfoot Sue, with a final gig at the London Astoria in 1999.

== Discography ==
=== Blackfoot Sue ===
- Nothing To Hide (1973)
- Strangers (1974)
- Gun Running – Unreleased (1975)
- The Best of Blackfoot Sue (1996)
- Talk Radio (1995) – re-released in 1998 as Red on Blue

=== Liner ===
- Liner (1979)
- Keep Reaching Out for Love
- Strange Fascination
- You and Me
- So Much in Love Again
- Run to the Night
- Sweet Music
- (You Know That) It's Alright
- Ship on the Ocean
- Night Train
- Window Pane

=== Outside Edge ===
- Outside Edge (1984)
- Running Hot (1986)
- In Concert (1986)
- More Edge (1987)
- Call Me (1990)
