= Metal Guru =

- German picture sleeve by Ariola label

Single by T. Rex

from the album The Slider
- B-side: "Thunderwing"; "Lady"
- Released: 5 May 1972
- Genre: Glam rock
- Length: 2:25
- Label: T. Rex Wax Co.
- Songwriter: Marc Bolan
- Producer: Tony Visconti

T. Rex singles chronology
"Telegram Sam" (1972)	"Metal Guru" (1972)	"Children of the Revolution" (1972)

"Metal Guru" is a song by the British rock band T. Rex, written by Marc Bolan. It was the band's fourth (and final) number one on the UK Singles Chart when it topped the chart for four weeks from May–June 1972. It was also included on the album The Slider in 1972.

== Song and recording ==
Bolan himself described the song's apparent religious references as this:

Is a festival of life song. I relate 'Metal Guru' to all gods around. I believe in a god, but I have no religion. With 'Metal Guru', it's like someone special, it must be a godhead. I thought how god would be, he'd be all alone without a telephone. I don't answer the phone any more. I have codes where people ring me at certain times.

The backing track for "Metal Guru" was recorded during initial sessions for The Slider between 8-12 March 1972 at Strawberry Studios, Chateau d'Herouville in France. At that point it had a stripped-down acoustic arrangement, with massive overdubs of electric guitars, orchestra, and backing vocals by Flo and Eddie added a few weeks later in London.

== Release and reception ==
The single was released on 5 May 1972 with the b-sides "Thunderwing" and "Lady". T. Rextasy was peaking in Britain at this time as it followed three preceding number one singles (and two number 2s), as well as Electric Warrior being the UK's best-selling album of 1971. Demand for T. Rex product was so hot at this time that two Fly repackages, a double set of Tyrannosaurus Rex's first two albums along with a greatest hits titled Bolan Boogie, both also topped the UK Albums Chart at the same time as "Metal Guru", the latter staying at the summit for four consecutive weeks. However, despite coming only ten months after the success of "Get It On", it failed to chart in the United States. The song reached No. 45 in Canada in July 1972.

Critical reception in the UK, like its commercial reception, was largely ecstatic. Roy Hollinghurst of Melody Maker gushed "swishy, dizzy, and full, and what's more it's 1972 and there's an idol there for idolising". Penny Valentine of Sounds noted that it was a throwback to 1950s doo-wop and forecasted another number one success, while Val Mabbs of Record Mirror opined that it was "catchy, repetitive, and insistent" and also predicted a number one. In the US, Cash Box noted an "intriguing use of strings and choir".

In 2008, Freaky Trigger placed "Metal Guru" at number 37 in their list of "The Top 100 Songs of All Time".

== Track listing ==
United Kingdom (EMI)

1. "Metal Guru"
2. "Thunderwing"
3. "Lady"

Germany and Spain (Ariola)

1. "Metal Guru" (2:25)
2. "Lady" (2:12)

France (Columbia)

1. "Metal Guru" (3:45)
2. "Lady" (3:50)

== Personnel ==
- Marc Bolan – vocals, guitar
- Mickey Finn – percussion, vocals
- Steve Currie – bass
- Bill Legend – drums
- Howard Kaylan, Mark Volman – backing vocals
- Tony Visconti – string arrangements
- Produced by Tony Visconti

== Chart performance ==
Chart (1972)	Peak position
Australia (Kent Music Report)	10
Australia (Go-Set National Top 40)	8
Canada Top Singles (RPM)	45
Finland (Suomen virallinen lista)	22
France (IFOP)	29
Ireland (IRMA)	1
New Zealand (Listener)	7
Norway (VG-lista)	4
South Africa (Springbok Radio)	14
Spain (AFE)	13
UK Singles (Official Charts)	1
West Germany (GfK)	1

Chart (1991)	Peak position
Ireland (IRMA)	27
UK Airplay (Music Week)	50

=== Year-end charts ===
Chart (1972)	Position
Australia (Kent Music Report)	80

== Cover versions ==
- In 2005, rock band Rooney covered the song for the Herbie: Fully Loaded soundtrack.
- Simon Goddard has said that "Panic" by The Smiths mimics "Metal Guru, while John Luerssen calls the song Johnny Marr's homage to the T. Rex song.
- In 2020, German Singer Nena covered the song.

== See also ==
- List of number-one hits of 1972 (Germany)
- List of number-one singles of 1972 (Ireland)
- List of UK Singles Chart number ones of the 1970s
