= T. Rex (band) =

English rock band (1967–1977)

- The classic 1971–1973 line-up of T. Rex (left to right): Bill Legend, Mickey Finn, Marc Bolan, Steve Currie

Background information
- Also known as: Tyrannosaurus Rex (1967–1970); Marc Bolan & T. Rex
- Origin: London, England
- Genres: Glam rock; pop; psychedelic folk (early)
- Years active: 1967–1977
- Labels: Regal Zonophone; Fly; EMI; Casablanca; Reprise; Relativity Records
- Spinoffs: X-T. Rex; Mickey Finn's T-Rex
- Spinoff of: John's Children
- Past members: Marc Bolan; Steve Peregrin Took; Mickey Finn; Steve Currie; Bill Legend; Gloria Jones; Paul Fenton; Jack Green; Dino Dines; Davy Lutton; Herbie Flowers; Tony Newman; Miller Anderson

T. Rex, originally Tyrannosaurus Rex, were an English rock band formed in London in 1967 by singer-songwriter and guitarist Marc Bolan, who was their leader, frontman and only consistent member. Originally an acoustic psychedelic folk band, Bolan began to change the band's style towards electric rock with their fourth album, 1970's A Beard of Stars, and shortened their name to T. Rex by the time their self-titled fifth album was released later that same year. This development culminated with their first significant hit single "Ride a White Swan", and the group soon became pioneers of the glam rock movement.

From 1970 to 1973, T. Rex were extremely popular in the UK, with a run of eleven top 10 singles, four of which reached number 1: "Hot Love", "Get It On", "Telegram Sam" and "Metal Guru". Other major hits included "Jeepster", "Children of the Revolution", "Solid Gold Easy Action", "20th Century Boy" and "The Groover". The band's 1971 album Electric Warrior received critical acclaim, reached number 1 in the UK and became a landmark album in glam rock. The 1972 follow-up, The Slider, was their most successful album in the US, where it went top 20. 1973's Tanx saw the band incorporating soul, funk and gospel into their sound. From 1974, T. Rex's appeal began to wane, though the band continued releasing albums, with their subsequent work blending rock with R&B and disco.

In 1977, Bolan died in a car crash several months after the release of the group's final studio album Dandy in the Underworld, and the group disbanded. T. Rex have continued to influence a variety of subsequent artists. The band were inducted into the Rock and Roll Hall of Fame in 2020.

== History ==
=== Formation and psychedelic folk (July 1967 – mid-1970) ===
Marc Bolan founded Tyrannosaurus Rex in July 1967, following a handful of failed solo singles and a brief period as lead guitarist in psych-rock band John's Children. After a solitary disastrous performance as a four-piece electric rock band on 22 July at the Electric Garden in London's Covent Garden alongside drummer Steve Porter plus two older musicians, guitarist Ben Cartland and an unknown bassist, the group immediately broke up. Subsequently, Bolan retained the band name and the services of Porter, who switched to percussion under the name Steve Peregrin Took, and the two began performing acoustic material as a duo with a repertoire of folk-influenced Bolan-penned songs. Inspired by an influential performance by Ravi Shankar whom Bolan had seen while touring West Germany with John's Children, the band adopted a stage manner resembling the performance of traditional Indian music.

The combination of Bolan's acoustic guitar and distinctive vocal style with Took's bongos and assorted percussion—which often included children's instruments, such as the Pixiphone—earned them a devoted following in the thriving hippy underground scene. BBC Radio 1 Disc jockey John Peel championed the band early in their recording career. Peel later appeared on record with them, reading stories written by Bolan. Another key collaborator was producer Tony Visconti, who produced all of the band's records through to the mid-1970s. Their debut album My People Were Fair and Had Sky in Their Hair... But Now They're Content to Wear Stars on Their Brows remained in the UK Albums chart for nine weeks and peaked at number 15. Their second album Prophets, Seers & Sages: The Angels of the Ages was released a few months later, reaching number 44.

During 1968–1969, Tyrannosaurus Rex had become a modest success on radio and on record. Their third single "Pewter Suitor", released in January 1969, failed to chart but their third album Unicorn charted just outside the Top Ten. While Bolan's pre-Tyrannosaurus Rex solo material had been rock and roll-influenced pop music, by now he was writing dramatic and baroque songs with lush melodies and surreal lyrics filled with Greek and Persian mythology as well as poetic creations of his own. The band became regulars on Peel Sessions on BBC radio, and toured Britain's student union halls.

Their fourth single "King of the Rumbling Spires", issued in July 1969, was a musical departure compared to the previous material: they used a full rock band setup with a drumkit and an entirely electric sound. However, by mid-1969, there was a rift developing between the two halves of Tyrannosaurus Rex. Bolan and his girlfriend June Child were living a quiet life, Bolan working on his book of poetry entitled The Warlock of Love and concentrating on his songs and performance skills. Took, however, had fully embraced the anti-commercial, drug-taking ethos of the UK Underground scene centred around Ladbroke Grove. Took was also attracted to anarchic elements such as Mick Farren/Deviants and members of the Pink Fairies Rock 'n' Roll and Drinking Club. Took also began writing his own songs, and wanted the duo to perform them, but Bolan strongly disapproved of his bandmate's efforts, rejecting them for the duo's putative fourth album, in production in Spring/Summer 1969. In response to Bolan's rebuff, Took contributed two songs as well as vocals and percussion to Twink's Think Pink album.

Behind the scenes, Bolan's relationship with Took ended after this dispute, although they were contractually obliged to go through with a US tour which was doomed before it began. Poorly promoted and planned, the acoustic duo was overshadowed by the loud electric acts they were billed with. To counter this, Took drew from the shock rock style of Iggy Pop; Took explained, "I took my shirt off in the Sunset Strip where we were playing and whipped myself till everybody shut up. With a belt, y'know, a bit of blood and the whole of Los Angeles shuts up. 'What's going on, man, there's some nutter attacking himself on stage.' I mean, Iggy Stooge had the same basic approach."

Bolan returned to the UK in September and advertised for a replacement for Took. A month later, he recruited percussionist Mickey Finn. and they completed the fourth album, released in early 1970 as A Beard of Stars, the final album under the Tyrannosaurus Rex moniker. This line-up headlined the first Glastonbury Festival in 1970. As well as progressively shorter titles, Tyrannosaurus Rex's albums began to show higher production values, more accessible songwriting from Bolan, and further experimentation with electric guitars and a true rock sound.

=== Glam rock and commercial success (July 1970 – December 1972) ===
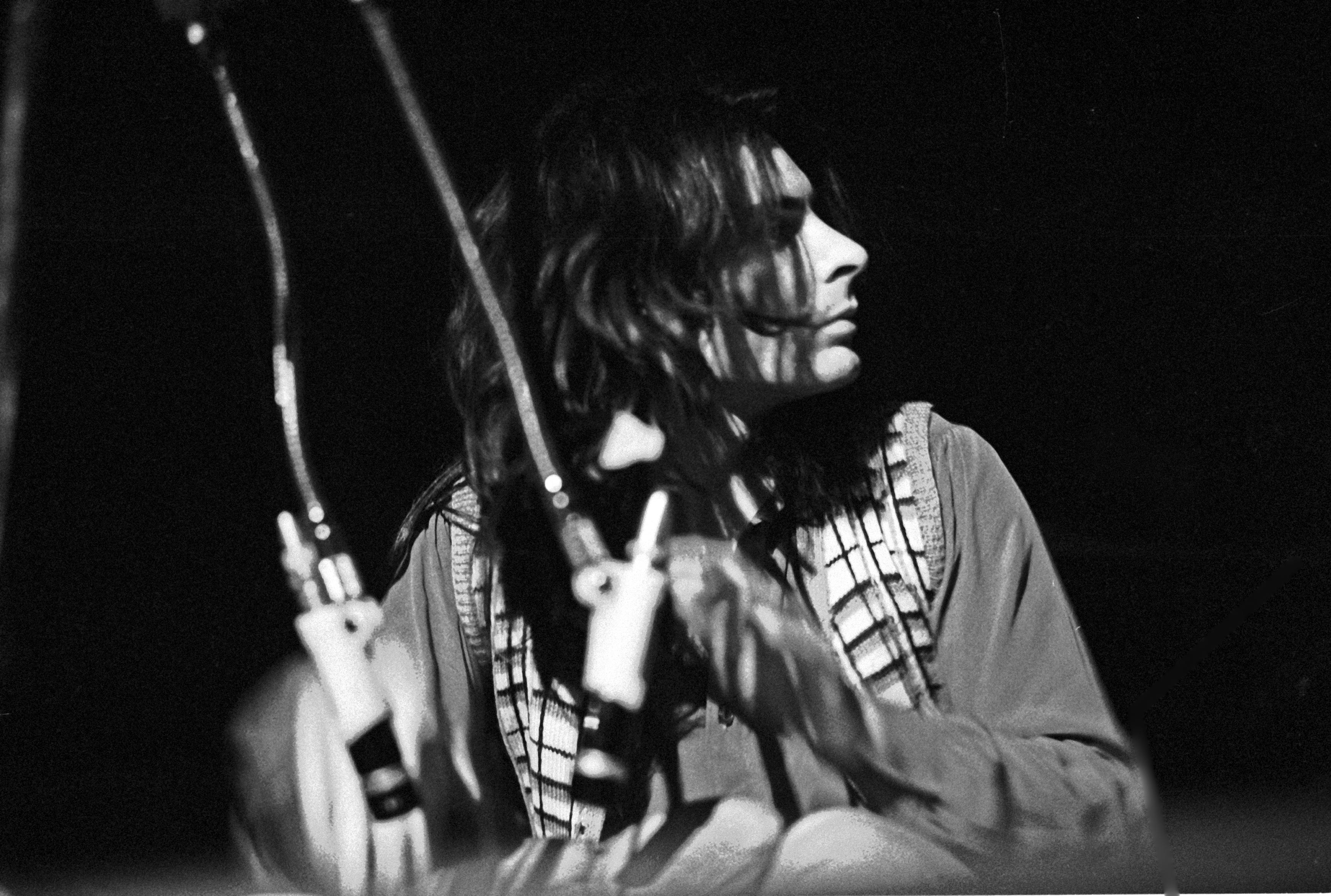
Finn performing with T. Rex in Hamburg, c. 1972 – c. 1973

Bolan continued the process of simplification by shortening the band's name to T. Rex. The new sound was more pop-oriented, and the first single, "Ride a White Swan", recorded in July and released in October 1970, made the Top 10 in the UK by late November and would soon reach number 2. Ticket fees were reduced to 10 shillings/50p to attract a younger audience. The eponymous first T. Rex album, also recorded that summer, was released in December and continued the move to electric guitars. In early 1971, T. Rex reached the top 20 of the official UK Albums Chart. During the February–April 1971 suspension of the official album chart (caused by a national postal strike) a chart by Melody Maker—which the Official Charts Company's website nowadays recognises as canonical for the gap period—listed the LP as having peaked at number 7.

"Ride a White Swan" was quickly followed by a second single, "Hot Love", which reached the top spot on the UK charts, and remained there for six weeks. At the end of 1970, Bolan expanded T. Rex from a duo to a trio, adding bassist Steve Currie (formerly of local Grimsby group "The Rumble Band" while working for the local tax office). A few months later, in early 1971, the band became a quartet with the addition of drummer Bill Legend, giving T. Rex a more full and conventional rock band line-up to record and tour to growing audiences. After Chelita Secunda added two spots of glitter under Bolan's eyes before an appearance on Top of the Pops, for which Bolan wore shiny satin trousers and a shiny jacket (from Chelsea boutique Alkasura) in place of his previous hippy clothes, soon followed by another appearance for the show on which he wore a silver velvet/satin sailor suit, the ensuing performances would often be viewed as the birth of glam rock.

Also during this time, Turtles alum Mark Volman and Howard Kaylan (aka Flo & Eddie) were brought in to sing background vocals, and although they were credited as part of the band proper, they did not tour with them due to their own touring schedules. On later projects, Bolan and Visconti would sing their own backing vocals in Flo & Eddie's style.

After Bolan's displays, glam rock would gain popularity in the UK and Europe during 1971–1972. The completion of T. Rex's move to electric guitar rock coincided with Bolan's more overtly sexual lyrical style and image. Having already begun standing up onstage to perform electric songs, Bolan also incorporated more physical showmanship, such as struts, dances and poses, into his stage act. The group's new image and sound quickly attracted a new audience much to the despair of the band's early fans. Some of the lyrical content of Tyrannosaurus Rex remained, but the poetic, surrealistic lyrics were now interspersed with sensuous grooves, orgiastic moans and innuendo.

In September 1971, T. Rex released Electric Warrior, the first album from the Bolan/Finn/Currie/Legend line-up. Often considered to be their best album, the chart-topping Electric Warrior brought much commercial success to the group; publicist BP Fallon coined the term "T. Rextasy" as a parallel to Beatlemania to describe the group's popularity. The album included T. Rex's best-known song, "Get It On", which hit number 1 in the UK. In January 1972 it became a Top Ten hit in the US, where the song was retitled "Bang a Gong (Get It On)". The album still recalled Bolan's acoustic roots with ballads such as "Cosmic Dancer" and the stark "Girl". Soon after, Bolan left Fly Records; after his contract had lapsed, the label released the album track "Jeepster" as a single without his permission. Bolan went to EMI, where he was given his own record label in the UK, T. Rex Records, also known as "The "T. Rex Wax Co."

The band released the singles "Telegram Sam" and "Metal Guru" respectively in January and May 1972, and both became number 1 hits in the UK. In May, Bolan's old label Fly released the chart-topping compilation album Bolan Boogie, a collection of singles, B-sides and LP tracks, which affected sales of the band's forthcoming album. When it was released in July, The Slider peaked at number four in the UK, and it became their most successful album in the US, entering the Top Twenty of the Billboard 200. The band then released two other standalone singles, "Children of the Revolution" and "Solid Gold Easy Action", which both reached number 2 in the UK. In December, Bolan's own rock film Born to Boogie was released to theatres. The film featured footage of two T. Rex shows at the Empire Pool, Wembley, which had been shot by Ringo Starr and his crew earlier in the year.

=== Transition, decline and resurgence (January 1973 – September 1977) ===
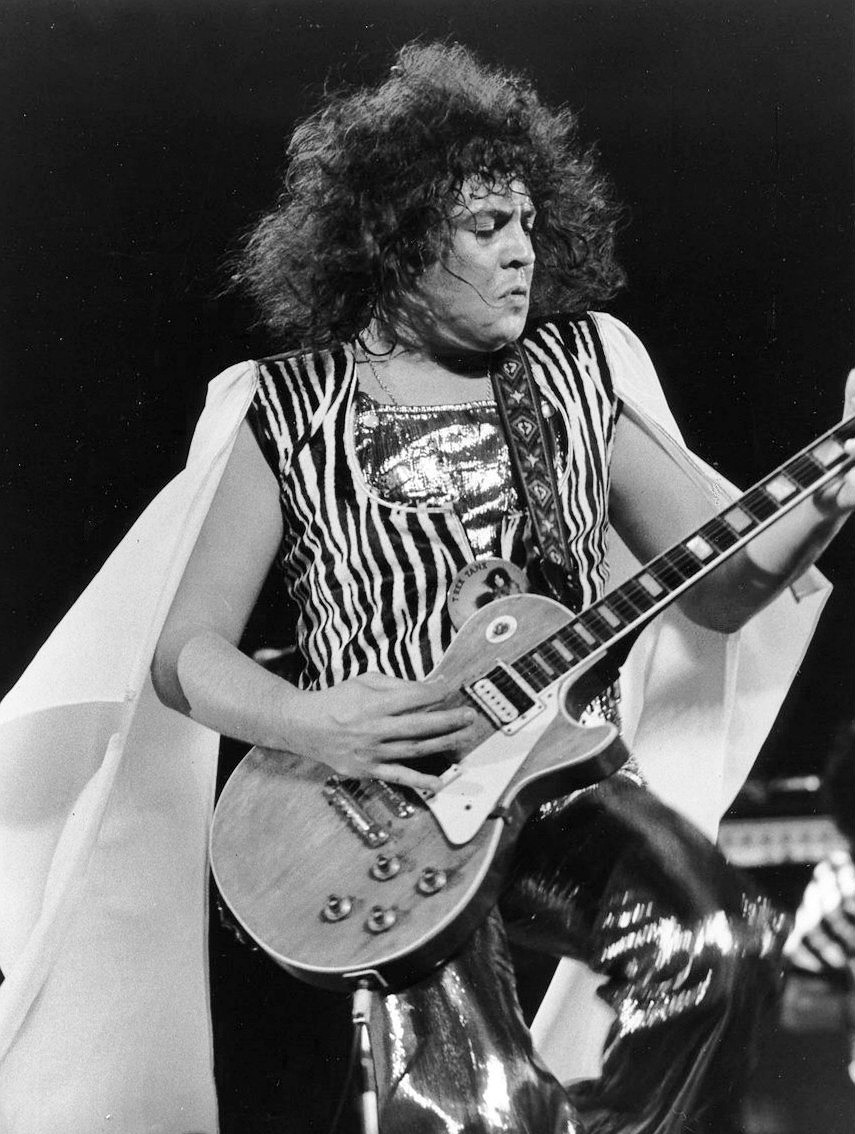
Bolan during a 1973 performance on In Concert

The next album, 1973's Tanx, was another commercial success, reaching number 3 in the German Albums chart, number 4 in the UK, and number 5 in Norway. An eclectic album containing several melancholy ballads and rich production, Tanx showcased the T. Rex sound bolstered by extra instrumental embellishments such as Mellotron and saxophone. "The Street and Babe Shadow" was funkier while the last song "Left Hand Luke and the Beggar Boys" was seen by critics as a nod to gospel with several female backing singers. Released at the same time in March 1973, the heavy rock track "20th Century Boy" was another important success, peaking at number 3 in the UK Singles chart but was not included in the album. "The Groover" marked the end of the golden era in which T. Rex scored 11 singles in a row in the UK Top Ten.

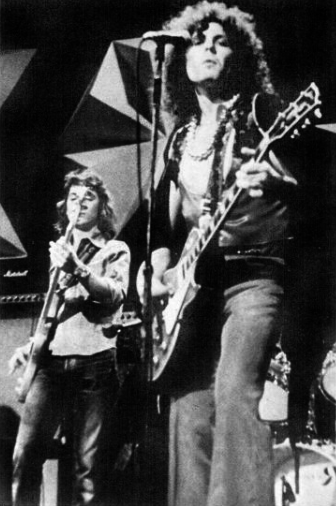
Steve Currie and Marc Bolan in November 1973

Zinc Alloy and the Hidden Riders of Tomorrow was released in February 1974, and reached number 12 in the UK. Musically, the band ventured into blue-eyed soul and blended rock with funk and R&B influences. Lyrically, the album harkened back to the Tyrannosaurus Rex days with long song titles and lyrical complexity, but was not a critical success. In the US, Warner Brothers dropped the band without releasing the album there. Bill Legend left the band after the album's completion. In addition to recruiting Paul Fenton as their new drummer, T. Rex extended their line-up with second guitarist Jack Green, pedal steel guitarist B. J. Cole and Bolan's girlfriend, singer and keyboardist Gloria Jones. Keyboardist Dino Dines was also added later in 1974, around the same time drummer Davey Luton replaced Fenton. Soon after Zinc Alloy... was released, Bolan split with producer Visconti, then in December 1974, Finn also left the band. A single, "Zip Gun Boogie", appeared in late 1974 credited as a Marc Bolan solo effort (though still on the T. Rex label). It only reached UK number 41, and the T. Rex band identity was quickly re-established.

Bolan's Zip Gun (1975) saw the group further developing the soul and funk of previous records. Most of the material had already been released the previous year in the US as Light of Love. It was self-produced by Bolan who, in addition to writing the songs, gave his music a harder, more futuristic sheen. Bolan's own productions were not well received in the music press. However, in the US, Rolling Stone magazine gave it a positive review. During this time Bolan became increasingly isolated, while high tax rates in the UK drove him into exile in Monte Carlo and the US. No longer a vegetarian, Bolan put on weight due to consumption of hamburgers and alcohol, and was ridiculed in the music press.

T. Rex's penultimate album, Futuristic Dragon (1976), featured an inconsistent production style that veered from Wall of Sound-style songs to disco backing, with nostalgic nods to the old T. Rex boogie machine. It only managed to reach number 50, but the album was better received by the critics and featured the singles "New York City" (number 15 in the UK) and "Dreamy Lady" (number 30). The latter was promoted as T. Rex Disco Party. To promote the album, Bolan assembled a new line-up, retaining Dino Danes on keyboards and recruiting bassist Herbie Flowers, drummer Tony Newman and second guitarist Miller Anderson for a UK tour, as well as appearances on television shows such as Top of the Pops, Supersonic and Get It Together.

In the summer of 1976, T. Rex released two more singles, "I Love to Boogie" (which charted at number 13) and "Laser Love", which made number 42. In early 1977, Dandy in the Underworld was released to critical acclaim. Bolan had slimmed down and regained his elfin looks, and the songs too had a stripped-down, streamlined sound. A spring UK tour with punk band the Damned on support garnered positive reviews. As Bolan was enjoying a new surge in popularity, he talked about performing again with Finn and Took, as well as reuniting with Visconti. A six-part television series, Marc, presented by Bolan and including multiple performances by T. Rex in each episode as well as other artists, was produced in Manchester by Granada Television for the ITV network. The band's final show took place at Gröna Lund in Stockholm, Sweden, on 24 March 1977.

=== Bolan's death, disbandment and reformation attempts ===
Marc Bolan and his girlfriend Gloria Jones spent the evening of 15 September 1977 drinking at The Speakeasy Club and then dining at Morton's club on Berkeley Square, in Mayfair, Central London. While driving home early in the morning of 16 September, Jones crashed Bolan's purple Mini 1275 GT into a tree (now the site of Bolan's Rock Shrine), after failing to navigate a small humpback bridge near Gipsy Lane on Queens Ride, Barnes, southwest London, a few miles from his home at 142 Upper Richmond Road West in East Sheen. While Jones was severely injured, Bolan was killed in the crash, at age 29. As Bolan had been the only constant member of T. Rex and also the only composer and writer, his management disbanded the remaining group (keyboardist Dino Dines and drummer Tony Newman; there was a vacancy for bassist) immediately upon his death.

As of 2026, drummer Bill Legend is the only surviving member from the classic 1971–1973 line-up, or indeed any line-up of T. Rex/Tyrannosaurus Rex prior to June 1973; Steve Peregrin Took went on to co-found Pink Fairies and appear on Mick Farren's solo album Mona – The Carnivorous Circus, before spending the 1970s working mostly on his own material, either solo or fronting bands such as Shagrat (1970–1971) and Steve Took's Horns (1977–1978). He died in 1980 from asphyxiation caused by choking on a cocktail cherry. The following year, Steve Currie, who had played for Chris Spedding before moving to Portugal in 1979, died in a car crash. Mickey Finn played as a session musician for the Soup Dragons and the Blow Monkeys before his death in 2003 of possible liver and kidney failure.

Since Bolan's death, there have been two known public attempts by former members to reform the band. These have drawn strong criticism from fans and former associates of Bolan who contend that without a living Bolan, no such band can be an authentic incarnation of T. Rex. In 1997, Finn, Green and Legend's successor, Paul Fenton, formed a "T. Rex" line-up, soon renamed Mickey Finn's T-Rex, with former Smokie and Saxon members. Following Finn's death in 2003, the band continued on as T. Rex (A Celebration of Marc and Mickey) until a petition signed by Legend, Tony Visconti and David Bowie, among others, forced them to revert to the name Mickey Finn's T-Rex with his family's blessing. In 2014, Legend put together his own version of the band, Bill Legend's T. Rex, later known as X-T. Rex.

== Influence and legacy ==
T. Rex vastly influenced several genres over several decades including glam rock, the punk movement, post-punk, indie pop, Britpop and alternative rock. They were cited by acts such as New York Dolls, the Ramones, Kate Bush, John Frusciante, Siouxsie and the Banshees, Joy Division, R.E.M., the Smiths, the Pixies, Guns N' Roses and Tricky.

Sylvain Sylvain of the New York Dolls said that when forming his band with Billy Murcia and Johnny Thunders: "[they]'d all sit on the bed with these cheap guitars and do Marc Bolan songs, as well as some blues and instrumentals". Sparks were inspired at their beginnings by Tyrannosaurus Rex, before T. Rex: seeing them live "was really our education" stated Ron Mael. The Stooges were inspired by T. Rex when composing and recording the songs of Raw Power. Guitarist and songwriter James Williamson related: "We were over in England at the time when Marc Bolan was red hot, and we were looking at his stuff and thinking 'hey, we could be like that,' and writing our stuff and just thinking it would take off." Joey Ramone of the Ramones said about Bolan: "I get into people who are unique and innovative and have colour. That's why I love Marc Bolan. There was something so mystical about him, his singing voice, his manner. His songs really move ya, they're so moving and dark." Sex Pistols frontman John Lydon credited the band and other artists for the emergence of punk rock: "T. Rex... — their influence was enormous".

Siouxsie and the Banshees performed a cover version of "20th Century Boy" early in their career, eventually releasing it as a B-side in 1979. Joy Division's Bernard Sumner was marked by the sound of the guitar of early T. Rex; his musical journey began at a poppy level with "Ride a White Swan". The Slits' guitarist Viv Albertine was fascinated by Bolan's guitar playing: "It was [...] the first time I ever listened to a guitar part. Because back then girls didn't really listen to guitar parts, it was a guy's thing. And guitars were really macho things then and I couldn't bear say, Hendrix's guitar playing, it was too in your face and too threateningly sexual, whereas Marc Bolan's guitar playing was kind of cartoony. And I could sing the parts. They weren't virtuoso, they were funny, they were humourous [sic] guitar parts."

Smiths' composer and guitarist Johnny Marr stated: "T. Rex was pure pop". The influence of T. Rex is very profound on certain songs of the Smiths like "Panic" and "Shoplifters of the World Unite". Lead singer Morrissey also admired Bolan. While writing "Panic" he was inspired by "Metal Guru" and wanted to sing in the same style. He didn't stop singing it in an attempt to modify the words of "Panic" to fit the exact rhythm of "Metal Guru". Marr later stated: "He also exhorted me to use the same guitar break so that the two songs are the same!" Marr rated Bolan in his ten favourite guitarists. Prefab Sprout's Paddy McAloon cited "Ride a White Swan" as "the song that vindicated my love of pop". R.E.M. covered live "20th Century Boy" early in their career in 1984: singer Michael Stipe said that T. Rex and other groups of the 1970s "were huge influences on all of us", "[they] really impacted me".

The Pixies's lead guitarist Joey Santiago cited Electric Warrior in his 13 defining records, as did the Jam's Paul Weller. Santiago said: "Bolan took the blues and made it a lot more palatable". Kate Bush listened to Bolan during her teenage years and then mentioned his name in the lyrics of the song "Blow Away (for Bill)". Nick Cave covered live "Cosmic Dancer", commenting that Electric Warrior contained "some of the greatest lyrics ever written", further adding, it was "my favorite record, [...] the songs are so beautiful, it is an extraordinary record". Tricky cited Bolan as "totally unique and ahead of his time". When talking about his favourite albums, PJ Harvey's collaborator John Parish said that T. Rex "is the place to start", adding that "this band and that album [Electric Warrior] was what got me into music in the first place". When he saw T. Rex on Top of the Pops playing "Jeepster", he felt: "that's my kind of music [...] The thing I related to as 12-year-old I still go back to and uses as one of my main touchstones when I'm making records". Parish explained, "I've been listening to T. Rex pretty consistently since 1971". Oasis "borrowed" the distinct guitar riff from "Get It On" on their single "Cigarettes & Alcohol". Oasis's guitarist, Noel Gallagher, has cited T. Rex as a strong influence. The early acoustic material was influential in helping to bring about progressive rock and 21st century folk music-influenced singers as Devendra Banhart, who said: "I love Tyrannosaurus Rex so much, it's so easy to love, so righteous to love, and so natural to love, I can't imagine anyone not liking it."

T. Rex are referenced in several popular songs, including David Bowie's "All the Young Dudes" (which he wrote for Mott the Hoople in 1972), the Ramones' "Do You Remember Rock 'n' Roll Radio?", Serge Gainsbourg's "Ex-Fan Des Sixties", the Who's "You Better You Bet", B A Robertson's "Kool in the Kaftan", R.E.M.'s "The Wake-Up Bomb", My Chemical Romance's "Vampire Money", and Panic! at the Disco's "Middle of a Breakup". The music of T. Rex features in the soundtracks of various movies, including Velvet Goldmine, Death Proof, Billy Elliot, the Bank Job, Dallas Buyers Club, and Baby Driver. The songs "Bang a Gong" and "Jewel" were featured prominently in Oz Perkins’ horror film Longlegs, as well as in the film’s promotional material. The sleeve of The Slider album can be seen in the Lindsay Anderson movie O Lucky Man!, and in Tim Burton's Dark Shadows. In Miha Mazzini's novel King of the Rattling Spirits, the narrator starts remembering his childhood when he sees Tyrannosaurus Rex record "King of Rumbling Spires" in the record store and realizes he has mistakenly remembered the title as "King of the Rattling Spirits".

== Members ==
Final line-up

- Marc Bolan – lead vocals, guitars (1967–1977; his death), keyboards (1969–1970) (Note: Played keyboards on "Organ Blues" live and on various studio tracks on Unicorn, A Beard Of Stars and T. Rex albums. Was sole, therefore lead, guitarist except during Jack Green and Miller Anderson's tenures.) bass (1969–1970, 1976) (Note: Played bass on the fourth and self-titled fifth album as well as on Dandy in the Underworld.)
- Dino Dines – keyboards (1974–1977; died 2004)
- Tony Newman – drums, percussion (1976–1977)
- Herbie Flowers – bass (1976–1977; died 2024) (Note: Completed his notice and left the band following completion of Marc show episode 6 on 7 September. Planned replacement Adrian Shaw had not been formally contracted therefore bass position was vacant at the time of Bolan's death.)

Former members

- Steve Peregrin Took - percussion, backing vocals (1967–1969; died 1980), drums (1967, (Note: One disatrous gig at Electric Garden.) 1969), bass (1969) (Note: Hired as drummer under the name Steve Porter for the same Electric Garden lineup as Cartland and unknown bassist. Retained afterwards as percussionist/vocalist. Played bass and toy drumkit on occasional tracks on Unicorn, "King Of The Rumbling Spires" single, planned fourth album tracks and live (drumkit on "Chariots of Silk", bass on "Do You Remember" live at the Lyceum April 1969).)
- Ben Cartland – guitar (1967)
- unknown – bass (1967)
- Mickey Finn – percussion, backing vocals (1969–1975; died 2003), drums (1970 and 1971), bass (1969–1970) (Note: Replaced Took in all capacities. Played bass live on songs such as "Elemental Child," "Ride A White Swan" and "Wind Cheetah" until Currie recruited. Played drumkit on studio version of Childe in June 1970 and at a handful of gigs in March 1971 and two TOTP appearances that same month.)
- Steve Currie – bass (1970–1976; died 1981)
- Bill Legend – drums (1971–1973) (Note: Session musician on "Hot Love" and "Woodland Rock" as Bill Fifield January 1971. Later auditioned successfully for full time slot in band March 1971 and debuted April 1971 on US radio session.)
- Gloria Jones – keyboards, tambourine, vocals (1973–1976)
- Paul Fenton – drums (1973–1974) percussion (1974) (Note: Hired to replace Legend, soon supplemented by Lutton, left shortly afterwards. Later played percussion on "Solid Baby" studio recording.)
- Jack Green – lead guitar (1973; died 2024)
- Davey Lutton – drums (1974–1976) percussion (1975–1976)
- Miller Anderson – lead guitar, backing vocals (1976–1977)

=== Album line-up timeline ===
	Tyrannosaurus Rex				T. Rex							
	My People Were Fair and Had Sky in Their Hair... But Now They're Content to Wear Stars on Their Brows (1968)	Prophets, Seers & Sages: The Angels of the Ages (1968)	Unicorn (1969)	A Beard of Stars (1970)	T. Rex (1970)	Electric Warrior (1971)	The Slider (1972)	Tanx (1973)	Zinc Alloy and the Hidden Riders of Tomorrow (1974)	Bolan's Zip Gun (1975)	Futuristic Dragon (1976)	Dandy in the Underworld (1977)
Lead vocals	Marc Bolan											
Guitar	Marc Bolan								Marc Bolan, B.J. Cole, Jack Green	Marc Bolan		Marc Bolan, Miller Anderson
Percussion	Steve Peregrin Took			Mickey Finn		Mickey Finn, Bill Legend	Mickey Finn					Marc Bolan
Bass			Steve Peregrin Took	Marc Bolan	Marc Bolan, Tony Visconti	Steve Currie			Steve Currie, Danny Thompson	Steve Currie		Steve Currie, Herbie Flowers, Scott Edwards, Marc Bolan
Drums	Steve Peregrin Took		Steve Peregrin Took		Mickey Finn	Bill Legend				Davy Lutton, Paul Fenton	Davy Lutton	Davy Lutton, Tony Newman, Paul Humphrey
Keyboards			Marc Bolan, Steve Peregrin Took	Marc Bolan, Tony Visconti		Rick Wakeman		Tony Visconti	Lonnie Jordan, Tony Visconti	Dino Dines, Gloria Jones		Dino Dines
Producer	Tony Visconti								Marc Bolan, Tony Visconti	Marc Bolan		

== Discography ==
As Tyrannosaurus Rex

- My People Were Fair and Had Sky in Their Hair... But Now They're Content to Wear Stars on Their Brows (1968)
- Prophets, Seers & Sages: The Angels of the Ages (1968)
- Unicorn (1969)
- A Beard of Stars (1970)

As T. Rex

- T. Rex (1970)
- Electric Warrior (1971)
- The Slider (1972)
- Tanx (1973)
- Zinc Alloy and the Hidden Riders of Tomorrow (1974)
- Bolan's Zip Gun (1975)
- Futuristic Dragon (1976)
- Dandy in the Underworld (1977)

== See also ==
- Glam rock
- List of 1970s one-hit wonders in the United States

== Bibliography ==
- Bolan, Marc (1969). The Warlock of Love. Lupus books.
- Bramley, John (2017). Marc Bolan: Beautiful Dreamer. John Blake Publishing Ltd.
- Du Noyer, Paul (1997). Marc Bolan (Virgin Modern Icons). Virgin books.
- Ewens, Carl (2007). Born to Boogie: The Songwriting of Marc Bolan. Aureus Publishing.
- Jones, Lesley-Ann (2013). Ride a White Swan: The Lives and Death of Marc Bolan. Hodder.
- McLenehan, Cliff (2002). Marc Bolan, 1947–1977: A Chronology. Helter Skelter Publishing.
- Paytress, Mark (2003). Bolan: The Rise and Fall of a 20th Century Superstar. Omnibus Press.
- Roland, Paul (2012). Cosmic Dancer: The Life & Music of Marc Bolan. Tomahawk Press.
- Sinclair, Paul (1982). Electric Warrior: The Marc Bolan Story. Omnibus Press.
- Tremlett, George (1975). The Marc Bolan Story. Futura Books.
