= Jeepster (song) =

- Cover of the original 7" single

Single by T. Rex

from the album Electric Warrior
- B-side: "Life's a Gas"
- Released: 5 November 1971
- Genre: Glam rock; boogie rock; blues rock; rockabilly
- Length: 4:12
- Label: Fly
- Songwriter: Marc Bolan
- Producer: Tony Visconti

T. Rex singles chronology
"Get It On" (1971)	"Jeepster" (1971)	"Telegram Sam" (1972)

"Jeepster" is a song by English glam rock band T. Rex. It was released on 5 November 1971 by record label Fly as a single from the group's sixth studio album (and second as T. Rex) Electric Warrior. The B-side, "Life's a Gas", is taken from the same album. Several artists have recorded cover versions of it. Both of the single's tracks were written by Marc Bolan and produced by Tony Visconti.

The music (and first couple of lines) of "Jeepster" is based on a Howlin' Wolf blues song called "You'll Be Mine," which was written by Willie Dixon. In interviews, T. Rex leader Marc Bolan acknowledged that he "lifted it from a Howlin' Wolf song."

== Release ==
Originally, "Jeepster" and "Life's a Gas" were pressed up together on 7-inch vinyl as a limited edition promotional disc for Electric Warrior. The disc was upgraded to a fully promoted single with "Jeepster" as the A side on 5 November 1971 by record label Fly. The single peaked at number 2 in the UK Singles Chart, and was controversial in that Fly Records promoted the song to hit status without singer Marc Bolan's prior permission, Bolan having just left Fly for EMI, which had given him control of his own label T. Rex Wax Co. Records. The song reached number 28 in Australia and number 73 in Canada. It was beaten to number 1 in the UK Singles Chart by "Coz I Luv You" by Slade for its first week at number 2 before being blocked from the top place by "Ernie (The Fastest Milkman in the West)" by Benny Hill for the remaining four weeks.

"Jeepster" is widely regarded as one of the band's best songs. Billboard and Paste ranked the song number three and number one, respectively, on their lists of the top 10 T. Rex songs.

== Personnel ==
=== T. Rex ===
- Marc Bolan – lead vocals, guitar
- Mickey Finn – congas, bongos
- Steve Currie – bass
- Bill Legend – drums

== Television ==
Bolan was a guest on the BBC Television show Cilla in January 1973. He and Cilla Black sang an acoustic version of "Life's a Gas".

== Cover versions ==
- Scottish band Altered Images covered the song and it appears on their Happy Birthday Plus album.
- English band the Polecats covered the song and released it as a 7" single in 1981, which peaked at number 53 on the UK Singles Chart.
- Former Marillion singer Fish covered the song as one of his personal favourites for his album Songs from the Mirror, released in 1993.
- American rock supergroup Hollywood Vampires, formed in 2015 by Alice Cooper, Johnny Depp and Joe Perry to honour the music of the rock stars who died from excess in the 1970s, included the song on their 2015 debut album Hollywood Vampires, to commemorate Marc Bolan's death on 16 September 1977.
- Chad Smith and Josh Klinghoffer of Red Hot Chili Peppers recorded a cover, along with another T. Rex track ("Monolith") for a 2019 Record Store Day 7" release.
- Joan Jett & the Blackhearts performed this on the Marc Bolan anthology of cover versions Angelheaded Hipster: The Songs of Marc Bolan & T. Rex, released in 2020.
