= Telegram Sam =

1972 song written by Marc Bolan

Single by T. Rex

from the album The Slider
- B-side: "Cadilac"; "Baby Strange"
- Released: 21 January 1972
- Recorded: 1971
- Genre: Glam rock
- Length: 3:45
- Label: T. Rex Wax Co. (UK); Reprise (US)
- Songwriter: Marc Bolan
- Producer: Tony Visconti

T. Rex singles chronology
| "Jeepster" (1971) | "Telegram Sam" (1972) | "Metal Guru" (1972) |

"Telegram Sam" is a song written by Marc Bolan for the British rock group T. Rex, appearing on their 1972 album The Slider. The song was their third UK number one single, remaining at the top of the charts for two weeks.

== Background and recording ==
"Telegram Sam" was allegedly written by Bolan about his manager Tony Secunda (Telegram Sam = Tony Secunda) who was his 'main man' in respect to being Bolan's manager and narcotics supplier.

The lyrics feature numerous figures such as Bobby (a natural born poet who is just outta sight), Golden Nose Slim (who knows where you been), Jungle Faced Jake (about whom no mistake must be made) and Purple Pie Pete (whose lips are like lightning and capable of generating a heat power sufficient to liquefy females). Despite their charms, the singer expresses his loyalty to his "main man", the titular Sam.

The song also contains these lines Marc Bolan wrote to refer to himself: "Me I funk/but I don't care/I ain't no square/with my corkscrew hair", a line which industrial rock band KMFDM would later borrow for their song "Me I Funk". The riff is similar in character to T. Rex's worldwide hit from the previous year, "Get It On" but in the key of A rather than E.

The single was recorded at the Rosenberg Studios in Copenhagen, Denmark in November 1971 along with its b-sides "Cadilac" and "Baby Strange" as well as the "Metal Guru" b-side "Thunderwing".

== Release and reception ==
"Telegram Sam" was the first single to be issued by Marc Bolan's own T. Rex Wax Co. label, released on 21 January 1972. The UK b-side featured two songs, "Cadilac" (as printed on the EMI label of the original single) and "Baby Strange", the latter also included in the album The Slider. The single was considered the official follow up to "Get It On", as previous record label Fly had released the intervening number 2 hit "Jeepster" without Bolan's permission. With T. Rextasy in full swing it became the group's third number one in their home country although it lagged at number 67 in the Billboard Hot 100, a disappointment after the American top ten success of "Get It On". It would be the group's last charted single in the US.

The song was received with high praise in the British press, where Chris Charlesworth of Melody Maker enthused that "Boley piles on the guitar riff and the strings top around him, rocking menace." Penny Valentine of Sounds, while noting the guitar riff as similar to "Get It On", nonetheless remarked that it reminds of "those good time real rock and roll records of the past". Derek Johnson of NME gushed that it was a "good old fashioned stomping rocker" that is "beaty, compelling, insistent, and catchy".

In 1980, the song was covered by the gothic rock band Bauhaus as a single, which peaked at number 12 in New Zealand.

== Personnel ==
- Marc Bolan: lead vocals, guitar
- Steve Currie: bass guitar
- Mickey Finn: congas
- Bill Legend: drums
- Howard Kaylan: backing vocals
- Mark Volman: backing vocals
- Tony Visconti: backing vocals

== Chart performance ==
| Chart (1972) | Peak position |
|---|---|
| Australia (Go-Set Top 40) | 20 |
| Canadian RPM Top Singles | 66 |
| France (SNEP) | 27 |
| Irish Singles Chart | 1 |
| Netherlands (Single Top 100) | 26 |
| New Zealand (Listener) | 19 |
| Norway (VG-lista) | 6 |
| Switzerland (Schweizer Hitparade) | 4 |
| UK (Official Charts Company) | 1 |
| US Billboard Hot 100 | 67 |
| West Germany (GfK) | 4 |

| Chart (1982) | Peak position |
|---|---|
| New Zealand (Recorded Music NZ) | 35 |
| UK (Official Charts Company) | 69 |

== Bauhaus version ==
"Telegram Sam"

Single by Bauhaus
- Released: 1 December 1980
- Genre: Post-punk; pop rock
- Length: 2:08
- Label: 4AD
- Songwriter: Marc Bolan

Bauhaus singles chronology
| "Terror Couple Kill Colonel" (1980) | "Telegram Sam" (1980) | "Kick in the Eye" (1981) |

"Telegram Sam" is the fourth single released by British gothic rock band Bauhaus. It was released in 7" and 12" format, the latter featuring a cover of John Cale's "Rosegarden Funeral of Sores" as an extra track.

== Track listings ==
7"

Side A:

1. "Telegram Sam" - 2:08

Side B:

1. "Crowds" - 3:13

12"

Side A:

1. "Telegram Sam" - 2:08

Side B:

1. "Rosegarden Funeral of Sores" - 5:31
2. "Crowds" - 3:13

=== Song appearances ===
- The Bauhaus version was used in "What's the Big Deal About Bauhaus?", a 1998 episode of The Ongoing History of New Music.
