= T. Rex discography =

- Studio albums: 14
- Extended plays: 2
- Live albums: 11
- Compilation albums: 28
- Singles: 47
- Video albums: 10
- Music videos: 7
- Remix albums: 1
- Box sets: 21

T. Rex were an English rock band, formed as Tyrannosaurus Rex in 1967 by singer-songwriter and guitarist Marc Bolan. The group came to an end after Bolan's death in a car crash in September 1977.

The T. Rex discography consists of four "Tyrannosaurus Rex" and ten "T. Rex" studio albums (one of which was a revision of another album, with a different name and tracklisting, for release in different territories; and another of which was released posthumously), eleven live albums, 28 compilation albums, 21 box sets, one remix album, 18 extended plays, seven "Tyrannosaurus Rex" singles (of which one was posthumously released), 39 "T. Rex" singles (of which 13 were posthumously released, including several charting reissues) and seven music videos.

== Albums ==
=== Studio albums ===
==== As Tyrannosaurus Rex ====
Title	Album details	Peak chart positions	
Title	Album details	UK	AUS
My People Were Fair and Had Sky in Their Hair... But Now They're Content to Wear Stars on Their Brows	Released: 5 July 1968; Label: Regal Zonophone; Formats: LP	15	—
Prophets, Seers & Sages: The Angels of the Ages	Released: 14 October 1968; Label: Regal Zonophone; Formats: LP	44	—
Unicorn	Released: 16 May 1969; Label: Regal Zonophone, Blue Thumb; Formats: LP, MC, 8-track	12	—
A Beard of Stars	Released: March 1970; Label: Regal Zonophone, Blue Thumb; Formats: LP, MC, 8-track	21	27
"—" denotes releases that did not chart or were not released in that territory.

==== As T. Rex ====
Title	Album details	Peak chart positions										Certifications
Title	Album details	UK	AUS	CAN	FIN	GER	IT	NOR	SPA	SWE	US	Certifications
T. Rex	Released: 18 December 1970; Label: Fly, Reprise; Formats: LP, MC, 8-track, reel-to-reel	7 (Note: As per the Official Charts Company's website. This is in dispute with the Guinness Book of British Hit Albums which listed the album as having peaked at number 13. The discrepancy was the result of the 1971 United Kingdom postal workers strike which initially resulted in no album chart. The Official Charts site recognises the Melody Maker chart for this period while the Guinness Book recognized only the weeks in which the official chart was published.)	37	—	—	—	18	—	—	—	188	
Electric Warrior	Released: 24 September 1971; Label: Fly, Reprise; Formats: LP, MC, 8-track, reel-to-reel	1	15	25	4	14	—	12	17	18	32	BPI: Gold; RIAA: Gold
The Slider	Released: 21 July 1972; Label: T. REX, Reprise; Formats: LP, MC, 8-track, reel-to-reel	4	13	11	11	7	15	8	—	10	17	
Tanx	Released: 16 March 1973; Label: T. REX, Reprise; Formats: LP, MC, 8-track, reel-to-reel	4	21	57	20	3	—	5	26	15	102	
Zinc Alloy and the Hidden Riders of Tomorrow	Released: 1 March 1974; Label: T. REX, Reprise; Formats: LP, MC, 8-track	12	45	—	—	—	—	—	—	—	—	
Light of Love	Released: August 1974; Label: Casablanca; Formats: LP, MC, 8-track; North America-only release	—	—	—	—	—	—	—	—	—	205	
Bolan's Zip Gun	Released: February 1975; Label: T. REX; Formats: LP, MC; Revised UK release of Light of Love	—	89	—	—	—	—	—	—	—	—	
Futuristic Dragon	Released: 30 January 1976; Label: T. REX; Formats: LP, MC	50	—	—	—	—	—	—	—	—	—	
Dandy in the Underworld	Released: 11 March 1977; Label: T. REX; Formats: LP, MC	26	—	—	—	—	—	—	—	—	—	
Billy Super Duper	Released: September 1982; Label: Marc on Wax; Formats: CD, LP, MC; Posthumous release credited as Marc Bolan & T. Rex	— (Note: Billy Super Duper did not enter the UK Albums Chart, but did peak at number 15 on the UK Independent Albums Chart.)	—	—	—	—	—	—	—	—	—	
"—" denotes releases that did not chart or were not released in that territory.

=== Live albums ===
Title	Album details	Peak chart positions	
Title	Album details	UK	GER
T. Rex in Concert	Released: 28 August 1981; Recorded: 19 May 1971 Wolverhampton 9 July 1971 Lewisham Odeon 12 August 1971 Royal Ballrooms Bournemouth 26 August 1971 Trentham Gardens Stoke-On-Trent 28 August 1971 Clifton Park Rotherham; Label: Marc; Formats: LP, MC	35	—
Born to Boogie – The Soundtrack Album	Released: November 1991; Recorded: 18 March 1972 Wembley Empire Pool; Label: Chrome Dreams; Formats: 2xCD; Soundtrack to the 1972 concert film consisting of footage from two T. Rex shows	129 (Note: Chart peak in 2005.)	89
BBC Radio 1 Live in Concert	Released: 1993; Recorded: 1 January 1970 BBC Paris Theatre London; Label: Windsong International; Formats: CD	—	—
Live 1977	Released: June 1997; Recorded: 18 March 1977 Rainbow Theatre London 20 March 1977 Locarno, Portsmouoth 11 November 1974 Agora Club, Cleveland, Ohio; Label: Edsel; Formats: 2xCD	—	—
Midnight Court at the Lyceum	Released: February 1998; Recorded: 11 April 1969 Lyceum London 25 January 1969 Brøndby Club, Copenhagen; Label: NMC Music; Formats: CD, 2xCD	—	—
There Was a Time	Released: 2000, second edition 2002; Recorded: 23 September 1967 Middle Earth Club London; Label: TAG (2000) Voiceprint Records (2002); Formats: CD	—	—
Live at the Boston Gliderdrome 1972	Released: 2001; Recorded: 15 January 1972 Boston Gliderdrome, Lincolnshire; Label: Diamondstar Productions; Formats: CD	—	—
Uncaged	Released: 2001; Recorded: 21 February 1971, 1 October 1971, 19 February 1973, Radio Bremen studios; Label: NMC Music; Formats: CD	—	—
For the Lion and the Unicorn in the Oak Forests of Faun	Released: 17 November 2003 (previously available as a bootleg in 1996); Recorded: as per Midnight Court At The Lyceum above, plus: 16 August 1969 Café au Gogo New York 13 January 1969 Queen Elizabeth Hall, London; Label: Chrome Dreams; Formats: CD	—	—
A Crown of Dark Swansdown	Released: 13 May 2016; Recorded: 4 April 1970 Sport Halle, Cologne, Germany; Label: Easy Action; Formats: CD, LP, digital download	—	—
Brondby Pop-Club	Released: 7 October 2016; Recorded: 25 January 1969 Brøndby Club, Copenhagen; Label: Easy Action; Formats: CD, digital download	—	—
"—" denotes releases that did not chart or were not released in that territory.

=== Remix album ===
Title	Album details	Peak chart positions
Title	Album details	UK
Remixes	Released: 1 September 2017; Label: Edsel; Formats: 2xCD, 3xLP, digital download	76

=== Compilation albums ===
Title	Album details	Peak chart positions							Certifications
Title	Album details	UK	AUS	FIN	GER	NOR	NZ	SPA	Certifications
Flyback 2: The Best of T. Rex	Released: March 1971; Label: Fly; Formats: LP, MC, 8-track	21	—	21	41	—	—	—	
Bolan Boogie	Released: 5 May 1972; Label: Fly; Formats: LP, MC, 8-track	1	24	—	—	13	—	12	
20th Century	Released: August 1973; Label: Ariola; Formats: LP, MC; Continental Europe-only release	—	—	—	38	—	—	—	
Great Hits	Released: 2 November 1973; Label: T. REX; Formats: LP, MC, 8-track	32	32	—	—	—	—	—	
Solid Gold	Released: June 1979; Label: EMI; Formats: LP, MC	51	—	—	—	—	—	—	
The Unobtainable T. Rex	Released: September 1980; Label: EMI; Formats: LP, MC	—	—	—	—	—	—	—	
Across the Airwaves	Released: 22 January 1982; Label: Cube; Formats: LP, MC	—	—	—	—	—	—	—	
Solid Gold Easy Action: 20 Golden Greats	Released: June 1982; Label: EMI; Formats: LP, MC; Australasia-only release	—	2	—	—	—	6	—	ARIA: Platinum
Best of the 20th Century Boy	Released: 29 April 1985; Label: K-tel; Formats: 2xLP, 2xMC	5	—	34	—	—	—	—	BPI: Gold
T. Rextasy: The Best of T. Rex, 1970–1973	Released: September 1985; Label: Warner Bros.; Formats: LP, MC; North America-only release	—	—	—	—	—	—	—	
Get It On	Released: 1986; Label: Dino Music; Formats: LP, MC; Australia-only release	—	36	—	—	—	—	—	
Cosmic Dancer: The Greatest Songs	Released: September 1987; Label: Teldec; Formats: CD, LP, MC; Germany-only release	—	—	—	40	—	—	—	
The Very Best of Marc Bolan and T. Rex	Released: May 1991; Label: Music Club; Formats: CD, MC	—	—	—	—	—	—	—	BPI: Platinum
The Ultimate Collection	Released: 16 September 1991; Label: Telstar; Formats: CD, LP, MC	4	—	—	—	—	—	—	BPI: Gold
Messing with the Mystic: Unissued Songs 1972–1977	Released: October 1994; Label: Edsel; Formats: CD	—	—	—	—	—	—	—	
Great Hits 1972–1977: The A-Sides and the B-Sides	Released: November 1994; Label: Edsel; Formats: CD	—	—	—	—	—	—	—	
The Essential Collection	Released: 25 September 1995; Label: PolyGram TV; Formats: CD, MC	24	—	—	—	—	—	—	BPI: Gold
The Best of the Unchained Series: Unreleased Recordings	Released: 1997; Label: Edsel; Formats: CD	—	—	—	—	—	—	—	
The Very Best of T-Rex	Released: May 1997; Label: Crimson; Formats: CD, MC; Re-released in 2002 as Hits! The Very Best of T. Rex	—	—	—	—	—	—	—	BPI: Platinum
The BBC Recordings 1970–1976	Released: September 1997; Label: New Millennium Communications; Formats: 2xCD	—	—	—	—	—	—	—	
The Very Best of T. Rex Vol. 2	Released: March 1999; Label: Music Club; Formats: CD	—	—	—	—	—	—	—	
Millennium Collection	Released: 23 August 1999; Label: Millennium; Formats: CD	—	—	—	—	—	—	—	
The Essential Collection	Released: 16 September 2002; Label: Universal Music TV; Formats: CD, MC	18	—	—	—	—	—	—	
Children of the Revolution: An Introduction to Marc Bolan	Released: 23 May 2005; Label: Music Club Deluxe; Formats: 2xCD	183	—	—	—	—	—	—	BPI: Gold
Greatest Hits	Released: 10 September 2007; Label: Universal; Formats: 2xCD	15	—	—	—	—	—	—	BPI: Silver
Get It On: The Collection	Released: 24 January 2011; Label: Spectrum Music; Formats: CD	—	—	—	—	—	—	—	BPI: Gold
Greatest	Released: 25 May 2015; Label: Crimson; Formats: CD	—	—	—	—	—	—	—	BPI: Silver
Gold	Released: 7 September 2018; Label: Crimson; Formats: 3xCD, 2xLP, digital download	8	—	—	—	—	—	—	BPI: Gold
"—" denotes releases that did not chart or were not released in that territory.

=== Box sets ===
Title	Album details	Peak chart positions		Certifications
Title	Album details	UK	US	Certifications
Prophets, Seers & Sages / My People Were Fair	Released: 14 April 1972; Label: Fly, A&M; Formats: 2xLP, MC; Released in the US as Tyrannosaurus Rex: A Beginning	1	113	
A Beard of Stars / Unicorn	Released: November 1972; Label: Cube; Formats: 2xLP	44	—	
History of T. Rex: The Singles Collection 1968–77	Released: November 1986; Label: Marc on Wax; Formats: 4xLP	—	—	
All the Hits and More	Released: 1991; Label: Star Direct; Formats: 3xCD, 3xLP, 3xMC	—	—	
Anthology	Released: October 1991; Label: Marc on Wax; Formats: 3xCD	—	—	
A Wizard, a True Star: Marc Bolan & T. Rex 1972–77	Released: October 1996; Label: Edsel; Formats: 3xCD	—	—	
Wax Co. Singles Volume 1 (1972–1974)	Released: 2001; Label: Edsel; Formats: 11xCDS	—	—	
Wax Co. Singles Volume 2 (1975–1978)	Released: 2002; Label: Edsel; Formats: 11xCDS	—	—	
20th Century Superstar	Released: September 2002; Label: Universal; Formats: 4xCD	—	—	
Solid Gold	Released: 15 September 2003; Label: Crimson; Formats: 3xCD	179	—	BPI: Silver
Total T.Rex 1971–1972	Released: 2 December 2005; Label: Easy Action; Formats: 5xCD+DVD	—	—	
A Whole Zinc of Finches	Released: 31 October 2005; Label: Easy Action; Formats: 5xCD+DVD	—	—	
The Electric Boogie: Nineteen Seventy One	Released: 25 June 2007; Label: Easy Action; Formats: 5xCD+DVD	—	—	
Unchained: Unreleased Recordings 1972 –1977	Released: 25 October 2010; Label: Edsel; Formats: 8xCD	—	—	
Classics	Released: January 2011; Label: Edsel; Formats: 5xCD	—	—	
Marc Bolan at the BBC: Radio Sessions and Broadcasts 1967–1977	Released: 26 August 2013; Label: Universal Music; Formats: 6xCD	146	—	
The Albums Collection	Released: 3 November 2014; Label: Edsel; Formats: 10xCD	—	—	
The 7" Singles Box Set	Released: 16 March 2015; Label: Edsel; Formats: 26x7"	—	—	
5 Classic Albums	Released: 14 October 2016; Label: Spectrum Music/Universal; Formats: 5xCD	—	—	
40th Anniversary Picture Disc Collection	Released: 13 October 2017; Label: Demon; Formats: 5x7"	—	—	
1972	Released: 22 April 2022; Label: Edsel; Formats: 5xCD, 6xLP, digital download	93	—	
"—" denotes releases that did not chart or were not released in that territory.

== EPs ==
Title	EP details	Peak chart positions	
Title	EP details	UK	UK Indie
Bolan's Best +1	Released: August 1977; Label: Cube; Formats: 7"	—	—
Life's a Gas	Released: June 1982; Label: Marc on Wax; Formats: 12"	—	—
Children of the Revolution	Released: 26 July 1982; Label: EMI; Formats: 7"	—	—
20th Century Boy	Released: 16 August 1982; Label: EMI; Formats: 7"	—	—
Truck On (Tyke)	Released: 6 September 1982; Label: EMI; Formats: 7"	—	—
Telegram Sam	Released: 27 September 1982; Label: EMI; Formats: 7"	—	—
Rare Magic	Released: June 1984; Label: Cube; Formats: 12"	159	—
Archive 4	Released: 16 June 1986; Label: Castle Communications; Formats: 12"	—	—
The Peel Sessions	Released: August 1987; Label: Strange Fruit; Formats: 12", MC	—	16
Catch a Bright Star	Released: 4 November 2016; Label: Easy Action; Formats: LP, digital download	—	—
Taverne de l'Olympia, Paris 1971	Released: 25 November 2016; Label: Easy Action; Formats: 10", digital download	—	—
Rock 'n' Roll	Released: 22 April 2017; Label: Easy Action; Formats: 7", digital download	—	—
At the Château d'Hérouville	Released: 6 October 2017; Label: Easy Action; Formats: LP, digital download	—	—
Drury Lane E.P.	Released: February 2019; Label: Easy Action; Formats: 7"	—	—
Extended Play	Released: 5 July 2019; Label: Easy Action; Formats: digital download	—	—
Dandy in the Underworld	Released: 30 September 2019; Label: Demon; Formats: 2x10"	—	—
Here There Be Trolls	Released: 11 October 2019; Label: Easy Action; Formats: 7", digital download	—	—
Theme for a Dragon	Released: 30 September 2022; Label: Easy Action; Formats: digital download	—	—
"—" denotes releases that did not chart.

== Singles ==
=== As Tyrannosaurus Rex ===
Title	Year	Peak chart positions		Album
Title	Year	UK	GER	Album
"Debora"	1968	34	—	(via B side) My People Were Fair and Had Sky in Their Hair... But Now They're Content to Wear Stars on Their Brows (Note: A-side was later re-recorded for Prophets, Seers & Sages: The Angels of the Ages)
"One Inch Rock"	1968	28	—	(via B side) Prophets, Seers & Sages: The Angels of the Ages (Note: A-side was later re-recorded for T.Rex)
"Pewter Suitor"	1969	—	—	(via B side) Unicorn
"King of the Rumbling Spires"	1969	44	—	Non-album single
"By the Light of a Magical Moon"	1970	—	—	A Beard of Stars
"Debora" / "One Inch Rock" (Note: Released as a maxi single, "Debora" alone was released on side one, with "One Inch Rock" and two other tracks, "Woodland Bop" and "The Seal of Seasons", released on side two. However, the single was promoted as a "Debora"/"One Inch Rock" double A-side.)	1972	7	45	Non-album singles
"Sleepy Maurice"	1991	—	—	Non-album singles
"—" denotes releases that did not chart or were not released in that territory.

=== As T. Rex ===
Title	Year	Peak chart positions										Certifications	Album
Title	Year	UK	AUS	CAN	GER	IRE	NL	NOR	NZ	SPA	US	Certifications	Album
"Ride a White Swan"	1970	2	68	48	34	11	—	—	9	—	76	BPI: Silver	(via B side track 1) T.Rex
"Hot Love"	1971	1	4	47	3	1	9	—	7	20	72		Non-album single
"Get It On"	1971	1	14	12	3	1	13	6	—	18	10	BPI: Platinum	Electric Warrior
"Jeepster"	1971	2	28	73	3	2	27	—	—	—	—		Electric Warrior
"Telegram Sam"	1972	1	27	66	4	1	26	6	19	—	67		The Slider
"Metal Guru"	1972	1	10	45	1	1	—	4	7	13	—		The Slider
"Children of the Revolution"	1972	2	13	—	4	1	—	—	—	14	—	BPI: Silver	Non-album single
"The Slider" (Note: "The Slider" was only released as a single in North America and New Zealand.)	1972	—	—	—	—	—	—	—	—	—	—		The Slider
"The King of the Mountain Cometh" (Note: "The King of the Mountain Cometh" was only released as a single in Japan.)	1972	—	—	—	—	—	—	—	—	—	—		Non-album single
"Solid Gold Easy Action"	1972	2	50	—	6	4	—	5	—	—	—		(via B side track 2) Tanx
"20th Century Boy"	1973	3	57	—	8	1	—	9	—	—	—	BPI: Silver	Non-album singles
"The Groover"	1973	4	—	—	5	11	—	—	—	—	—		Non-album singles
"Truck On (Tyke)"	1973	12	—	—	17	—	—	—	—	20	—		Non-album singles
"Teenage Dream" (as Marc Bolan and T. Rex)	1974	13	—	—	39	—	—	—	—	—	—		Zinc Alloy and the Hidden Riders of Tomorrow
"Light of Love"	1974	22	—	—	—	—	—	—	—	—	—		Bolan's Zip Gun
"Think Zinc" (Note: "Think Zinc" was only released as a single in Germany and Spain.)	1974	—	—	—	47	—	—	—	—	—	—		Bolan's Zip Gun
"Precious Star" (Note: "Precious Star" was only released as a single in the US.)	1974	—	—	—	—	—	—	—	—	—	—		Bolan's Zip Gun
"Zip Gun Boogie" (as Marc Bolan on original issue)	1974	41	—	—	—	—	—	—	—	—	—		Bolan's Zip Gun
"New York City"	1975	15	92	—	—	—	—	—	—	—	—		Futuristic Dragon
"Dreamy Lady" (as T. Rex Disco Party)	1975	30	—	—	—	—	—	—	—	—	—		Futuristic Dragon
"London Boys"	1976	40	—	—	—	—	—	—	—	—	—		Non-album single (Note: B side was from earlier album Bolan's Zip Gun)
"I Love to Boogie"	1976	13	—	—	—	—	—	—	—	—	—	BPI: Gold	Dandy in the Underworld
"Laser Love"	1976	41	—	—	—	—	—	—	—	—	—		Non-album single
"The Soul of My Suit"	1977	42	—	—	—	—	—	—	—	—	—		Dandy in the Underworld
"Dandy in the Underworld"	1977	—	—	—	—	—	—	—	—	—	—		Dandy in the Underworld
"Celebrate Summer"	1977	—	—	—	—	—	—	—	—	—	—		Non-album single (Note: B side was from earlier album Futuristic Dragon)
"Crimson Moon" / "Jason B Sad"	1978	—	—	—	—	—	—	—	—	—	—		Dandy in the Underworld
"Telegram Sam" (reissue)	1982	69	—	—	—	—	—	—	—	—	—		Non-album singles
"Deep Summer" (as Marc Bolan and T. Rex)	1982	—	—	—	—	—	—	—	—	—	—		Non-album singles
"Christmas Bop" (as Marc Bolan and T. Rex)	1982	— (Note: "Christmas Bop" did not enter the UK Top 75, but did peak at number 40 on the UK Independent Singles Chart.)	—	—	—	—	—	—	—	—	—		Non-album singles
"Think Zinc" (reissue)	1983	106	—	—	—	—	—	—	—	—	—		Non-album singles
"Megarex"	1985	72	—	—	—	—	—	—	—	—	—		Non-album singles
"Sunken Rags" (as Marc Bolan and T. Rex)	1985	124	—	—	—	—	—	—	—	—	—		Non-album singles
"Children of the Revolution" (remix)	1987	90	—	—	—	—	—	—	—	—	—		Non-album singles
"Get It On" (remix)	1987	54	—	—	—	—	—	—	—	—	—		Non-album singles
"20th Century Boy" (reissue; as Marc Bolan and T. Rex)	1991	13	—	—	—	8	—	—	—	—	—		The Ultimate Collection
"Metal Guru" (reissue; as Marc Bolan and T. Rex)	1991	83	—	—	—	27	—	—	—	—	—		The Ultimate Collection
"Get It On" (Bus Stop featuring T. Rex)	2000	59	—	—	—	—	—	—	—	—	—		Get It On
"Childlike Men" (as T. Rex Regeneration)	2012	—	—	—	—	—	—	—	—	—	—		Non-album single
"—" denotes releases that did not chart or were not released in that territory.

== Videography ==
=== Video albums ===
Title	Album details
Laser Love	Released: September 1985; Label: Marc on Wax; Formats: VHS
Solid Gold	Released: 4 June 1989; Label: Marc on Wax; Formats: LD; Japan-only release
T.Rexmas Special	Released: 1990; Label: Jeepster; Formats: LD; Japan-only release
Born to Boogie – The Movie	Released: 1991; Label: Picture Music International; Formats: VHS
The Ultimate Collection	Released: October 1991; Label: Telstar Video Entertainment; Formats: VHS
The Essential Video Collection	Released: 31 October 1991; Label: Relativity; Formats: VHS; US-only release
The Best of MusikLaden Live Double Feature	Released: 1998; Label: Pioneer Artists; Formats: DVD, VHS; Split with Roxy Music; North America-only release
Special Edition EP	Released: 2003; Label: Classic Pictures Entertainment; Formats: DVD
On T.V.	Released: 5 June 2006; Label: Warner Music Vision/Demon Vision; Formats: DVD
Marc	Released: 2007; Label: Network; Formats: DVD

=== Music videos ===
Year	Title	Album
1972	"Telegram Sam"	The Slider
1972	"Buick MacKane"	The Slider
1972	"Children of the Revolution"	non-album
1973	"The Groover"	non-album
1974	"Light of Love"	Bolan's Zip Gun
1975	"Dreamy Lady"	Futuristic Dragon
1977	"The Soul of My Suit"	Dandy in the Underworld
