= Bolan Boogie =

Compilation album by T. Rex
- Released: 5 May 1972
- Recorded: 1969–1971
- Genre: Glam rock, psychedelic folk
- Length: 45:44
- Label: Fly

T. Rex compilation album chronology
The Best of T. Rex (1971)	Bolan Boogie (1972)	Great Hits (1973)

Professional ratings
Review scores
Source	Rating
AllMusic	4.5/5 stars
New Musical Express	3/5 stars
Uncut	4/5 stars

Bolan Boogie is a compilation album by the English glam rock band T. Rex. After Marc Bolan had left Fly Records to form his own label distributed through EMI/T. Rex Wax Co, his former label released this compilation in 1972 with recent single A- and B-sides recorded in 1970 and 1971, many of which had not appeared on previous albums. Also included are album tracks from Tyrannosaurus Rex's Unicorn (1969), A Beard of Stars (1970) and T. Rex's T. Rex (1970).

== Release ==
Bolan Boogie was released on May 5th 1972 by the Fly record label. With T. Rextasy at its absolute peak that spring following the group's acclaimed shows at the Empire Pool in Wembley, the compilation quickly reached number one on the UK Albums Chart, spending three weeks at the top, although it would also be Bolan's last album to do so.

== Track listing ==
All tracks are written by Marc Bolan, except "Summertime Blues", written by Eddie Cochran and Jerry Capehart.

Side A
No.	Title	Length
1.	"Get It On" (single A-side, included on Electric Warrior – 1971)	4:25
2.	"Beltane Walk" (from T. Rex – 1970)	2:20
3.	"The King of the Mountain Cometh" (originally the B-side of "Hot Love" – 1971)	3:48
4.	"Jewel" (from T. Rex)	2:48
5.	"She Was Born to Be My Unicorn" (from Unicorn – 1969)	2:32
6.	"Dove" (from A Beard of Stars – 1970)	2:02
7.	"Woodland Rock" (originally the B-side of "Hot Love")	2:25
8.	"Ride a White Swan" (single A-side – 1970)	2:13

Side B
No.	Title	Length
1.	"Raw Ramp" (originally the B-side of "Get It On")	5:13
2.	"Jeepster" (single A-side from Electric Warrior)	4:08
3.	"First Heart Mighty Dawn Dart" (from A Beard of Stars)	2:41
4.	"By the Light of a Magical Moon" (single A-side, included on A Beard of Stars)	2:46
5.	"Summertime Blues" (Originally the B-side of "Ride a White Swan")	2:40
6.	"Hot Love" (single A-side - 1971)	4:55

== Personnel ==
- Marc Bolan – lead vocals, acoustic and electric guitars (all tracks), harmonium (track 5)
- Mickey Finn – congas, bongos, backing vocals (tracks 1–4, 6–14)
- Steve Currie – bass (tracks 1, 3, 7, 9, 10, 14)
- Bill Legend – drums, tambourine (tracks 1, 7, 9, 10, 14)
- Steve Peregrin Took – bongos, backing vocals, African talking drum, bass (track 5)

== Additional personnel ==
- Tony Visconti – production (all tracks), bass
- Howard Kaylan – backing vocals (tracks 1, 3, 10, 14)
- Mark Volman – backing vocals (tracks 1, 3, 10, 14)
- Rick Wakeman – piano on track 1

== Charts ==
Chart performance for Bolan Boogie
Chart (1972)	Peak position
Australian Albums (Kent Music Report)	17
Norwegian Albums (VG-lista)	13
UK Albums Chart	1
