= Great Jewish Music: Marc Bolan =

Compilation album by Various Artists
- Released: September 15, 1998
- Recorded: April – June 1998
- Genre: Avant-Garde
- Label: Tzadik Records
- Producer: Danny Cohen

Professional ratings
Review scores
Source	Rating
Allmusic	3/5 stars
The Austin Chronicle	3.5/4 stars

Great Jewish Music: Marc Bolan is a tribute album featuring the music of English singer/songwriter Marc Bolan of the band T.Rex. Produced by Danny Cohen, it was released on John Zorn's label Tzadik Records in 1998 as part of their series on "Radical Jewish Culture", following similar prior tributes to Burt Bacharach and Serge Gainsbourg.

After covering the song "Would I Be the One?" on this album, Sean Lennon recorded a different version and included that version on his 2006 album Friendly Fire. Lennon said that he did this because he liked his arrangement of the 1998 version, but was unhappy about the quality of the recording, since it was recorded on a four-track recorder due to Zorn's limited album budget of $400 or $500.

Fantômas's cover of "Chariot Choogle" for this album was the first official release by that band.

== Track listing ==
1. "Children of the Revolution" - Arto Lindsay and Marc Ribot - 2:41
2. "Telegram Sam" - Rebecca Moore - 4:27
3. "Get It On" - Kramer - 3:49
4. "Buick MacKane" - Melvins - 3:07
5. "Groove a Little" - Medeski Martin & Wood - 4:13
6. "Cosmic Dancer" - Lo Galluccio - 4:47
7. "Chariot Choogle" - Mike Patton as Fantômas - 1:51
8. "Ride a White Swan" - Tall Dwarfs - 3:05
9. "Rip Off" - Chris Cochrane - 3:40
10. "Deboraarobed" - Gary Lucas - 2:44
11. "Mambo Sun" - Eszter Balint - 3:51
12. "Jeepster" - Vernon Reid - 4:33
13. "Lunacy's Back" - Danny Cohen - 2:45
14. "Life's A Gas" - Elysian Fields - 4:11
15. "Would I Be the One?" - Sean Lennon and Yuka Honda - 3:36
16. "Love Charm" - Cake Like - 2:48
17. "Scenescof" - Trey Spruance - 1:41
18. "20th Century Boy" - Buckethead - 7:24
19. "Romany Soup" - Lloyd Cole - 3:55

== Personnel ==
"Children of the Revolution"

- Melvin Gibbs - Bass
- Dougie Bowne - Drum programming
- Marc Ribot - Guitar, producer
- Arto Lindsay - Vocals, guitar, producer
- Eddie Sperry - Engineering, mixing
- Anthony Coleman - Sampler

"Telegram Sam"

- Stephen Vitiello - Guitar, mixing
- Rebecca Moore - Producer, vocals, bass, sampler, Synthesizer, Violin, mixing

"Get It On"

- Charles Curtis - Cello
- Kramer - Producer, voice, instruments
- Tess - Vocals

"Buick MacKane"

- Mark Deutrom - Bass, producer
- Dale Crover - Drums, producer
- King Buzzo - Guitar, producer

"Groove A Little"

- Billy Martin - Drums, producer
- Chris Wood - Guitar, producer
- John Medeski - Keyboards, producer
- Scotty Hard - Producer

"Cosmic Dancer"

- Banjo Victor - Guitar
- Lo Galluccio - Producer, vocals, synthesizer

"Chariot Choogle"

- Mike Patton - Producer, vocals, instruments

"Ride a White Swan"

- Dr. Rhythm - "Drums thru a fuzz box"
- Chris Knox - Backing guitar, handclaps, lead vocals, producer
- Alec Bathgate - Guitar, handclaps, Backing vocals, producer

"Rip-Off"

- JD Foster - Bass, sampler
- Chris Cochrane - Producer, vocals, instruments

"Deboraarobed"

- Gary Lucas - Slide guitar, Electronics, vocals, producer
- Murray Weinstock - producer

"Mambo Sun"

- JD Foster - Bass, sampler, producer
- Christine Bard - Drums
- Jim Pugliese - Drums
- Chris Cochrane - Guitar
- Ted Reichman - Organ
- Martin Bisi - Engineering
- Eszter Balint - Vocals, violin

"Life's A Gas"

- Oren Bloedow - Instruments, producer
- Jennifer Charles - Vocals, producer

"Would I Be The One?"

- Sean Lennon - Producer, vocals, instruments
- Yuka Honda - Producer, vocals, instruments

"Love Charm"

- Kerri Kenney - Bass, vocals
- Jody Seifert - Drums, vocals
- Nina Hellman - Guitar, vocals
- Craig Wedren - Producer, mixing
- Kevin McMahon - Producer, mixing

"Scenescof"

- Phil Franklin - Percussion
- Trey Spruance - Producer, vocals, organ, guitar, Toy piano

"20th Century Boy"

- Buckethead - Producer, guitar, bass, Tambourine
- Travis Dickerson - Engineering
- Pinchface - Vocals, drums

"Romany Soup"

- Self Righteous Brothers - Producer
- Lloyd Cole - Vocals, instruments

== Credits ==
- Suehiro Maruo - Artwork
- Ikue Mori - Design
- John Zorn - Executive producer
- David Newgarden - Executive producer
- Kazunori Sugiyama - Executive producer
- Allan Tucker - Mastering
- Marc Bolan - Music, Lyrics
