= Prophets, Seers & Sages: The Angels of the Ages =

Studio album by Tyrannosaurus Rex
- Released: 1 November 1968
- Recorded: 16 May – 8 August 1968
- Studio: Trident, London
- Genre: Psychedelic folk; folk-pop
- Length: 30:22
- Label: Regal Zonophone
- Producer: Tony Visconti

Tyrannosaurus Rex chronology
My People Were Fair and Had Sky in Their Hair... But Now They're Content to Wear Stars on Their Brows (1968)	Prophets, Seers & Sages: The Angels of the Ages (1968)	Unicorn (1969)

Prophets, Seers & Sages: The Angels of the Ages is the second studio album by English psychedelic folk band Tyrannosaurus Rex (later known as T. Rex). It was released on 1 November 1968 by record label Regal Zonophone.

== Background ==
Tyrannosaurus Rex's debut album My People Were Fair and Had Sky in Their Hair... But Now They're Content to Wear Stars on Their Brows had been an unexpected success, charting at number 15 on the UK Albums Chart with the non-LP single "Debora" coming in at number 34 on the UK singles chart. Demand for the group's appearances increased in the summer of 1968 as they began to headline club shows and appear at large festivals; the money brought in by record sales also allowed them to buy new instruments and PA equipment. At this time the duo were also picked up by Blackhill Enterprises, who managed Pink Floyd; soon after, singer-songwriter Marc Bolan moved in with his new girlfriend June Child, who worked at Blackhill and had recently ended a relationship with Syd Barrett. That August, while finishing the recording of their second album, the group's second single "One Inch Rock" broke the top 30, peaking at number 28 and confirming their modest climb up the ladder of pop stardom.

== Songs and recording ==
Prophets, Seers & Sages was recorded from May to August 1968 at Trident Studios in London, England and produced by Tony Visconti. The album featured Marc Bolan on vocals and guitar and Steve Peregrin Took on bongos, African drums, kazoo, pixiephone and Chinese gong.

The album opened with a revisiting of Tyrannosaurus Rex's first single, the minor top 40 hit "Debora", altered midway by a reversed-tape effect, as indicated by its new title "Deboraarobed". "Eastern Spell" had first been demoed in 1966 yet was passed over for the debut. The brief "Juniper Suction" also featured backwards psychedelic effects and contained oblique references to sex with new girlfriend June Child; in a 1973 interview Marc identified it as the moment he felt he was getting somewhere as a songwriter. The term "Salamanda Palaganda" came to Bolan one day while taking a long car drive, and he couldn't get it out of his head so he wrote a song around it. "Trewlany Lawn" depicts "good" animals vs. "evil" man; the "good vs. evil" theme reappears on the closing "Scenescof Dynasty", a spoken word poem accompanied only by handclaps. Marc explained that it tells the story of two men who get sucked into the evil Scenescof's body, where they must find a way to kill him. Other tracks attempted during the sessions but not on the final album include the outtake "Nickelodeon" and the single "One Inch Rock" (also first demoed in 1966), which became a minor UK hit when it peaked at number 28 in the UK Singles Chart that August.

Marc had been dissatisfied with the production of the debut Tyrannosaurus Rex album, feeling the resulting sound was reedy and thin, so he made sure this time that for every two hours spent on recording, three would be spent on production. This resulted in a more palatable sound mix, although the instrumentation remained relatively spare. Recording sessions began on 22 April with "One Inch Rock" and "Conesuala" at Olympic Studios in London, although neither of these early versions would see release. Regrouping at Trident Studios on 16 May, the duo recorded "Stacey Grove", "One Inch Rock" (remake), "Wind Quartets", "Eastern Spell" and "Scenescof Dynasty", with most taking only a few takes with the exception of "One Inch Rock" which took 6 takes and "Eastern Spell" which took 12. On 10 June, they recorded "Salamanda Palaganda", "Conesuala" (remake), "Nickelodeon" and "Wind Quartets" (remake), although a satisfactory take of "Wind Quartets" continued to elude them. On 13 June, a master of "Wind Quartets" was completed along with overdubs to other songs. On 4 July, "Our Wonderful Brownskin Man", "Juniper Suction", "Nickelodeon" (remake) and "O Harley" were committed to tape, while another session sometime in mid-July produced the remake of "Debora" retitled "Deboraarobed" as well as "The Travelling Tragition". The final recording session took place on 8 August, resulting in masters of "Trewlany Lawn", "Aznageel the Mage" and "The Friends", all recorded in 3-5 takes each.

== Release ==
Prophets, Seers & Sages was released on 1 November 1968 by record label Regal Zonophone, but failed to chart in the top 30 of the UK Albums Chart upon first release (it reached number 44). It is speculated that its sales were adversely affected by its release coming a mere four months after the debut.

The album was released in both mono and stereo editions; on the labels, "Oh Harley (the Saltimbanques)" was spelled "O Harley (the Saltimbanques)".

The album was paired with the first Tyrannosaurus Rex album, My People Were Fair and Had Sky in Their Hair... But Now They're Content to Wear Stars on Their Brows (1968), and re-released by Fly Records as a double album on 14 April 1972, following the success of the T. Rex album Electric Warrior (1971). This re-released edition of the album reached number one in the UK Albums Chart. The double LP set was released in the United States on A&M Records titled Tyrannosaurus Rex: A Beginning, and was the first time those albums were available in that country.

In 2004, the album was remastered and reissued by A&M Records with 14 bonus tracks. In 2015, a two-disc deluxe edition was released by A&M in Europe with the first disc containing the remastered album along with non-LP tracks and BBC session material on disc one, with 30 studio outtakes on disc two.

== Reception and legacy ==
Professional ratings
Review scores
Source	Rating
AllMusic	3/5 stars
New Musical Express	2/5 stars
Tiny Mix Tapes	favourable
Uncut	2/5 stars

Initial reviews for the album were nearly as positive as for the debut, with Chris Welch in Melody Maker declaring that duo had "hit upon the simplest and most effective recording sound in history". John Ford of Beat Instrumental opined that "beneath the superficial similarity of many of the tracks there's a lot of variety, covering a wide range of moods with great effectiveness". New Musical Express, however, while complimenting the lyrics, complained that the sound became unmelodic and monotonous over its length.

In a retrospective review, AllMusic wrote that "the album delivered some of Marc Bolan's most resonant songs...The already classic pop of the opening "Deboraarobed" is further dignified by its segue into the same performance played backwards, a fairly groundbreaking move at a time when even the Beatles were still burying such experiments deep in the mix". The reviewer concluded by remarking that Bolan "created a whole new language -- half nonsense, half mystery, but wholly intoxicating". Tiny Mix Tapes wrote that it was a psychedelic folk album with "intense bongo action" and "strong backing vocals". The reviewer added that "Prophets remains a timeless album for everyone" and its original arrangements ensured it "a long life for many generations to come".

"Debora", the original recording of "Deboraarobed", features in Edgar Wright's 2017 film Baby Driver and appeared on its soundtrack.

== Track listing ==
All tracks are written by Marc Bolan.

Side A
No.	Title	Length
1.	"Deboraarobed"	3:33
2.	"Stacey Grove"	1:59
3.	"Wind Quartets"	2:57
4.	"Conesuala"	2:25
5.	"Trelawny Lawn"	1:46
6.	"Aznageel the Mage"	1:59
7.	"The Friends"	1:19

Side B
No.	Title	Length
1.	"Salamanda Palaganda"	2:15
2.	"Our Wonderful Brownskin Man"	0:51
3.	"Oh Harley (The Saltimbanques)"	2:19
4.	"Eastern Spell"	1:41
5.	"The Travelling Tragition"	1:48
6.	"Juniper Suction"	1:13
7.	"Scenescof Dynasty"	4:07

== Personnel ==
Personnel taken from the album's liner notes.

Tyrannosaurus Rex

- Marc Bolan – vocals, guitar
- Steve Peregrin Took – bongos, vocals, African talking drums, assorted percussion, kazoo, Pixiphone, Chinese gong

Additional personnel

- Tony Visconti – producer
- Malcolm Toft – engineer
- Peter Sanders – photographs
