= T. Rex (album) =

Studio album by T. Rex
- Released: 18 December 1970
- Recorded: 14 May – 31 August 1970
- Studio: Trident, London
- Genre: Rock; folk rock; glam rock; psychedelic folk
- Length: 37:41
- Label: Fly (UK); Reprise (US)
- Producer: Tony Visconti

T. Rex chronology
A Beard of Stars (1970)	T. Rex (1970)	Electric Warrior (1971)

T. Rex is a 1970 album by English rock band T. Rex, the first under that name and the fifth since their debut as Tyrannosaurus Rex in 1968. It was released on 18 December by record labels Fly and Reprise. The album continued the shift begun by its predecessor from the band's previous folk style to a minimal rock sound, with an even balance of electric and acoustic material.

== Background ==
The duo's previous album A Beard of Stars had charted moderately well at number 21, selling around the same amount of copies as previous Tyrannosaurus Rex records, but frontman Marc Bolan felt frustrated at not being able to break out of cult status. The new lineup with Finn toured extensively throughout the UK and Europe during 1970, acquainting audiences with their new electric sound while recording an album meant to capture it on tape. At the same time, Bolan's company signed with a new label, Fly Records. Just as their next single "Ride a White Swan" was to see release in October 1970, Bolan decided to shorten the group's name to T. Rex, reflecting the change in style (as well as making it easier for people to pronounce).

== Songs and recording ==
Although the album was credited to T. Rex, all the recordings (as well as the cover shot) were done when they were still known as Tyrannosaurus Rex, with the two-man lineup of singer-songwriter and guitarist Marc Bolan and percussionist Mickey Finn, while producer Tony Visconti played bass and recorder on a couple of tracks. Bolan had considered calling the album The Wizard or The Children of Rarn, before opting for a self-titled album.

The album continued in the vein of the duo's previous effort A Beard of Stars, with an even further emphasis on an electric rock sound as well as the addition of strings, scored by Visconti, on several tracks. Certain tracks like "The Time of Love is Now", "Suneye" and "Root of Star" were stylistically closer to the folk music of Tyrannosaurus Rex but electric guitars and bass are fully integrated in tracks like "Jewel", "Childe", "Beltane Walk", "Diamond Meadows", "Is It Love", and "One Inch Rock", foreshadowing the style of the follow-up. As on previous albums, the lyrics were inspired in part by Tolkien, including poetry about wizards, Druids, and a "Liquid Poetess in a buckskin dress". Journalist Tom Everett observed that Bolan was "clearly infatuated with mysticism, as well as the pure sounds of the English language", although it would be the final time this subject matter would dominate his work. Elsewhere, "The Visit" details a UFO abduction while "Diamond Meadows" and "Suneye" are more conventional love songs that presage future ballads.

The album contained electric reworkings of two old Tyrannosaurus Rex songs, one of which, "The Wizard", was originally recorded as the A side of Bolan's (solo) first single in 1965. The second was an electric version of the second Tyrannosaurus Rex single, "One Inch Rock", with an intro of scat-singing by Bolan and Finn, which the duo had been incorporating into live acoustic versions for some months prior to the album sessions. The remaining songs, however, were new material. "The Children of Rarn" and its reprise, which opened and closed the UK album, were an incursion into symphonic rock which Bolan had wanted to develop into a full concept album which he was never able to complete; a 16-minute demo suite of its songs was taped in 1971. The B-side, a cover of "Summertime Blues", plus the intricate guitar instrumental outtake "Deep Summer" were also recorded during the sessions.

Recording sessions began at Trident on 14 May 1970 with the rockers "Jewel" and "Is It Love", "Jewel" having already been premiered in concert; this session set the stage for an electric pop/rock album. On 1 June, the more tranquil "Diamond Meadows" and "The Visit" were taped along with "Ride a White Swan" (some sources list 1 July as the date for "Swan"). On 16 June, the instrumental outtake "Deep Summer" was attempted but left unreleased. On 24 June, Howard Kaylan of the duo Flo and Eddie attended the session for "Seagull Woman" to sing backup vocals for the first time on a T. Rex song (although his partner Mark Volman was also credited on the sleeve, session documentation does not confirm this). The duo would go on to sing on many of the group's subsequent string of hits. "Summer Deep" and "The Time of Love Is Now" were recorded on 26 June, while "Beltane Walk" and an early version of the "Hot Love" B-side "King of the Mountain Cometh" were attempted on 1 July. Remakes of two older songs, "One Inch Rock" and "The Wizard" were recorded 6 July along with "The Children of Rarn". The final sessions on 5 and 31 August saw "Root of Star" committed to tape. Session notes for the recording of "Childe" and "Suneye" appear to be lost.

== Album cover ==
The sleeve design was unusual, requiring a sideways look to unfold the full cover, or to have the artwork sideways to remove the LP. The cover pic was taken that summer by Pete Sanders at his parents' home in Selbridge. White pancake face makeup was worn by Marc and Mickey, while Bolan clutched his electric guitar to suit the new electric image he was trying to create. A preface to the printed lyrics states "Dedicated To All Who Are And Will Be Forevermore."

== Release ==
T. Rex was released on 18 December 1970 by Fly and Reprise. The US pressing of the LP concluded with "Ride a White Swan" rather than "The Children of Rarn (Reprise)".

The album broke T. Rex in the UK, following the surprise success of the then-recent single "Ride a White Swan", which reached No. 2 in the UK Singles Chart, and before its No. 1 follow-up "Hot Love". The album is today listed by the Official Charts Company's website as having eventually reached a chart peak of No. 7 and accumulated several runs on the charts totaling 25 weeks. This peak however took place during the 1971 United Kingdom postal workers strike, during which no album chart was issued and therefore the site recognises the Melody Maker chart for February–April 1971. The Guinness Book of British Hit Albums which did not recognise any album chart for the missing weeks, listed the album as having peaked at No. 13.

In 2004, the album was remastered and reissued by A&M Records with 9 bonus tracks. In 2014, a two-disc deluxe edition was released by A&M in Europe with the first disc containing the remastered album along with non-LP tracks and a BBC radio session on disc one, with a plethora of demos and studio outtakes on disc two.

== Reception and legacy ==
Professional ratings
Review scores
Source	Rating
AllMusic	4/5 stars
The Guardian	4/5 stars
New Musical Express	3.5/5 stars
Rolling Stone	very favourable
Uncut	3/5 stars

Upon release, Rolling Stone published a glowing review saying, "It's difficult to isolate any one or two songs as being special favorites". Reviewer Todd Everett praised the band for "their ability to intermix vocal and instrumental sounds — the voices often go into a feedback guitar imitation. It's not the kind of trick every group should try". In the UK reception was also highly positive, with Ray Hollingworth of Melody Maker describing it as "energy-packed rock, basted with Bolan's poetic and imaginative vocals", while Nick Logan of New Musical Express opined it was "immensely enjoyable...electricity has had a dual effect of strengthening the rhythmic and melodic qualities of Bolan's compositions and after five albums, it must be a source of satisfaction to pull out such good songs". Disc & Music Echo also called it superb, claiming "sweeping strings and lush backings suit this duo far better than one might have expected" while Penny Valentine at Sounds noted "people may argue that T. Rex's sound is no longer mystic and pure, but I for one am thankful it's not...Marc, while still retaining a lot of typical Bolanesque, now has much more rhythmic appeal and firm attraction".

In his retrospective review, Mark Deming of AllMusic wrote, "T. Rex is the quiet before the storm of Electric Warrior, and it retains a loopy energy and easy charm that makes it one of Bolan's watershed works". Writing for The Guardian, Alexis Petridis noted that the album "allowed Bolan's instincts to the fore: more electric guitar; sharper, simpler rhythms; vocals doused in the old-fashioned slapback echo found on "Heartbreak Hotel"; strings accentuating a penchant for what Julian Cope would later characterize as the “Glam Descend”, chord sequences lurching in downward patterns that sound simultaneously melancholy and triumphant". Likewise, a review in Ultimate Classic Rock calls it an instant classic, noting that the album is filled with songs like "Childe", "Beltane Walk", and "One Inch Rock" that are "50's rockers dressed up in early 70's flair...Bolan, along with Finn and producer Tony Visconti, mined a sound that, with just a bit of tweaking, would catapult T. Rex onto the pop charts with a string of massive hits in their native U.K."

== Influence of the album on later genres ==
Eater (band), an early British punk rock band from North London took their name from a line in the song "Suneye", which features the verse "Tyrannosaurus Rex, the eater of cars." Richard Barone of the Bongos covered "The Visit" on his first solo album, Cool Blue Halo (1987). Siouxsie Sioux covered "Jewel" in 1999 with her second band the Creatures.

== Track listing ==
All tracks are written by Marc Bolan, except where noted.

Side A
No.	Title	Length
1.	"The Children of Rarn"	0:53
2.	"Jewel"	2:46
3.	"The Visit"	1:55
4.	"Childe"	1:41
5.	"The Time of Love Is Now"	2:42
6.	"Diamond Meadows"	1:58
7.	"Root of Star"	2:31
8.	"Beltane Walk"	2:38

Side B
No.	Title	Length
1.	"Is It Love?"	2:34
2.	"One Inch Rock"	2:28
3.	"Summer Deep"	1:43
4.	"Seagull Woman"	2:18
5.	"Suneye"	2:06
6.	"The Wizard"	8:50
7.	"The Children of Rarn (Reprise)" (the U.S. version features "Ride a White Swan" in place of this track)	0:36

2004 Expanded Edition bonus tracks
No.	Title	Writer(s)	Length
16.	"Ride a White Swan" (Single A-side)		2:30
17.	"Summertime Blues" (Single B-side)	Eddie Cochran, Jerry Capehart	2:42
18.	"Poem"		0:34
19.	"The Visit" (Take 4)		1:57
20.	"Diamond Meadows" (Take 6)		1:56
21.	"One Inch Rock"		2:26
22.	"Seagull Woman"		2:19
23.	"The Wizard"		8:33
24.	"The Children of Rarn"		0:42

== Personnel ==
T. Rex

- Marc Bolan – vocals, guitar, bass, organ
- Mickey Finn – drums, bass, Pixiphone, vocals

with:

- Tony Visconti – bass, piano, recorder, string arrangements, production
- Howard Kaylan – backing vocals
- Mark Volman – backing vocals
- Roy Thomas Baker – engineering

== Charts ==
Chart (1970/71)	Peak position
Australia (Kent Music Report)	37
UK Albums Chart	7 (Official Charts website); 13 (Guinness Book of British Hit Albums)
