= Debora (disambiguation) =

Debora Racing Cars is a French car builder.

Debora may also refer to:

- Debora, a given name, a variant of Deborah
- SS Debora, Hong Kong steamship (also known as Empire Mayport and Bright Star)
- Debora (song), song by T. Rex
