= Super Spade (disambiguation) =

Super Spade is a character in the film You Are What You Eat.

Super Spade or Superspade may also refer to:

- Superspade, a term used to describe African Americans that were exceptionally gifted
- Super Spade, band formed by Johan van Reede and Annemiek van Gründling of Gore
