= My Name Is Jack =

1968 single by Manfred Mann

Single by Manfred Mann
- B-side: "There Is a Man"
- Released: 7 June 1968
- Recorded: March 1968
- Studio: Trident, London
- Genre: Pop rock; psychedelic pop
- Length: 2:50
- Label: Fontana
- Songwriter: John Simon
- Producers: Gerry Bron; Manfred Mann

Manfred Mann singles chronology
"(Theme from) Up the Junction" (1968)	"My Name Is Jack" (1968)	"Fox on the Run" (1968)

"My Name Is Jack" is a song written by American record producer John Simon and released as a single by British group Manfred Mann in 1968. Their version reached number 8 on the UK Singles Chart. It became an international Top 10 hit, but only reached number 104 in the US.

== Background ==
The lyrics and music were written by John Simon, and his own version was included on the soundtrack of the 1968 film You Are What You Eat. The song tells the story of a resident of the "Greta Garbo Home for Wayward Boys and Girls", which was the nickname of a real hostel, the Kirkland Hotel, in San Francisco, where part of the movie was filmed. Formerly Sakutaro Nakano's Kashu Hotel, 1701 Laguna Street, the building became dilapidated and was demolished, and the Christ United Presbyterian Church was opened on the site in 1975. "Superspade", a real-life Haight Ashbury drug dealer, is also mentioned.

Early versions of the Manfred Mann cover also reference "Superspade", but as it is also a slur, the band later re-recorded the song with the more familiar "Superman" in its place, at the request of their US distributor, Mercury.

The song was recorded at one of the first high-profile sessions at the newly constructed Trident Studios in London, which would later become renowned for its use by such artists as the Beatles, David Bowie, Queen, and others.

== Personnel ==
Mike d'Abo – vocals, piano
Manfred Mann – keyboards
Tom McGuinness – guitar
Klaus Voormann – bass guitar
Mike Hugg – drums

== Chart history ==
Chart (1968)	Peak position
Austria	1
Australia (Go-Set)	10
Australia (Kent Music Report)	7
Canada RPM Top Singles	27
Finland (Suomen Virallinen)	33
Germany	7
Ireland (IRMA)	13
Netherlands	16
New Zealand (Listener)	10
UK Singles Chart	8
U.S. Billboard	104

== Cover versions ==
- 1978 – Moonriders, Nouvelles Vagues
- 1994 – Pizzicato Five, Great White Wonder
