= Great Horse =

The term Great Horse may refer to

- Destrier, the "great horse" ridden by knights during the Middle Ages
- Leonardo's horse, a.k.a. Gran Cavallo, a statue of a destrier or great horse
- "Great Horse", a song by Tyrannosaurus Rex from their 1970 album A Beard of Stars
