= Malcolm Toft =

- Origin: Kingston upon Thames, England
- Genres: Hard rock, Art rock, Alternative rock, Glam rock, Progressive rock, Folk rock, Pop rock
- Occupation: Recording Engineer,
- Instrument: Guitar
- Years active: 1964 – present

Malcolm Toft is an audio engineer and businessman who worked at Trident Studios, first as an audio engineer, then as the studio's manager, and eventually as co-founder of recording console maker Trident Audio Developments. Toft went on to form another console company, Malcolm Toft Associates, which eventually led to Toft Audio Designs and the founding of Ocean Audio. Currently he manufactures a range of professional audio products under his own name. Toft was also co-owner of The Music Mill Studios in Newton Abbot, Devon. In 2009 he was awarded a visiting professorship by Leeds College of Music. He is also a member of the University of West London Student Advisory board which mentors students during the last year of their degree courses in music technology. In July 2023 The University of West London awarded him an Honorary Doctorate of Science.

== Trident Studios and Trident Audio Development ==
Toft started at Tony Pike music in 1964 as a trainee and two years later moved to CBS Studios. He joined Europe's first 8-track recording facility, Trident Studios in London, in 1967 as its first engineer after being offered the position while attending the studio's opening party. He worked with Tony Visconti during the recording of British band Tyrannosaurus Rex's first three albums and David Bowie's Space Oddity album. He later engineered James Taylor's debut album and was the mix engineer on The Beatles' song "Hey Jude."

In 1971, Toft became Trident Studios' manager. The next year, the studio decided to upgrade from 16-track to 24-tracks but wasn't able to source a console with the size, features, and configuration that they wanted, so they decided they would design and build their own. Working together with Barry Porter, Toft took on management and systems design of the project, which became the Trident A Range console and led to Toft becoming Managing Director of Trident Audio Developments, Ltd. (TRIAD), an offshoot of Trident Studios that built and sold professional recording consoles. He was responsible for the concept and many design aspects which led to the unique sound of the Trimix, Series 80, TSM, Series 65 and Series 70 consoles. In 1981 Toft, together with Jack Hartfield, bought TRIAD, but in 1988, unhappy with the direction of the company's new product designs, Toft sold his interest and left the company, although under the stipulation of a three-year non-compete agreement.

== Malcolm Toft Associates ==
In 1992, with encouragement from one of Trident's United States distributors, Toft designed a new console. Building on which he intended as something of an update to his Trident Series 80 designs, he released a range of consoles and related products under the Malcolm Toft Associates (MTA) brand. Toft later partnered with Ted Fletcher and Fletcher ElectroAcoustics to form Trident-MTA.

== Malcolm Toft and Toft Audio Designs ==
From 2001, Malcolm Toft was hired as a consultant to design products for the PMI Audio Group. These products were released under the brand name Toft Audio Designs which is owned by PMI Audio Group. PMI Audio Group acquired Trident Audio Developments' assets in October 2008, Toft was once again developing products under the direction of PMI Audio for the Trident name.

== Ocean Audio ==
At the end of 2012, after 12 years working as a freelance consultant for the PMI Audio Group, Malcolm Toft formed a new company: Ocean Audio

Under the brand name Ocean Audio, Malcolm Toft designed the first analogue console with full support for 500 series modules. The Ark

== The Music Mill ==
Toft and Rick Edwards co-founded the Music Mill Studio in Newton Abbot (Devon), UK, a recording and broadcast studio and education facility for music technology and music composition where, in partnership with South Devon College, courses in recording, radio, music, and the performing arts are taught.

In January 2009, Toft was awarded a visiting professorship in music technology by Leeds College of Music. At the 2011 Music Producers Guild awards Toft had the honor of presenting longtime colleague Tony Visconti with the PMI Audio sponsored award for Innovation in Production.

== Bassics ==
In 2015 Toft decided to move into the musical instrument field and designed the Bassics pre-amplifier system designed specifically for bass players. A unique approach to bass guitar pre-amplification which moves the controls normally found on the amplifier to a unit that can be placed directly on the floor in front of the player.

Currently, He designs a range of professional audio products under the 'Malcolm Toft' brand which combines his various products under one identity.

== Engineering credits ==
Selected engineering credits:

- 1967: David Bowie – David Bowie (1967 album)
- 1968: Tyrannosaurus Rex – Prophets, Seers & Sages: The Angels of the Ages
- 1968: James Taylor – James Taylor (album)
- 1969: David Bowie – Space Oddity
- 1969: Tyrannosaurus Rex – Unicorn
- 1970: Brian Davison – Every Which Way
- 1970: Aphrodite's Child – It's Five O'Clock
- 1970: The Nice – Five Bridges Suite
- 1971: The Nice – Elegy
- 1971: The Nice – Keith Emerson With The Nice
- 2004: Ace Kefford – Ace The Face
- 2008: The Move – Anthology 1966-1972
