= Unicorn (Tyrannosaurus Rex album) =

Studio album by Tyrannosaurus Rex
- Released: 16 May 1969 (UK) July 1969 (North America)
- Recorded: 5 November 1968 – 2 February 1969
- Studios: Trident, London
- Genre: Psychedelic folk
- Length: 39:46
- Labels: Regal Zonophone (UK); Blue Thumb (North America)
- Producer: Tony Visconti

Tyrannosaurus Rex chronology
Prophets, Seers & Sages: The Angels of the Ages (1968)	Unicorn (1969)	A Beard of Stars (1970)

Unicorn is the third studio album by English psychedelic folk band Tyrannosaurus Rex (later known as the glam rock band T. Rex). It was released on 16 May 1969 by record labels Regal Zonophone and Blue Thumb, and was the last Tyrannosaurus Rex album to feature Steve Peregrin Took.

== Background ==
By 1969, Tyrannosaurus Rex had become favorites on the UK underground circuit, with their debut album charting as high as number 15 and first two singles hitting the top 40, although the follow up album released just four months later could only bubble under at number 44. The duo made their first festival appearances at the 18th National Jazz, Blues and Pop Festival as well as the first Isle of Wight Festival, plus TV appearances in Europe. They had yet to break through into the mainstream, but at this point singer-songwriter Marc Bolan seemed steadfastly determined to remain an unrepentant hippie playing all-acoustic psychedelic folk music, even as the fashion appeared to be slowly fading. Realizing that he needed to do something to evolve his sound, however, he tried a different approach when he entered the studio at the end of 1968 to record the group's third album.

== Songs and recording ==
Like the previous Tyrannosaurus Rex album, Unicorn was recorded at London's Trident Studios with producer Tony Visconti and engineer Malcolm Toft over a period of several months in between live dates. Its music featured Marc Bolan on vocals, guitar, harmonium, lip organ and phonofiddle plus Steve Took on percussion (bongos, African talking drum, drum kit, pixiephone, gong), bass, guitar and piano, with the piano on "Catblack" played by Visconti. Marc claimed in a contemporary interview that the album was in two parts: six songs featuring just guitar and bongos like the duo's previous records, with the rest aiming for a uniquely all-acoustic, Spectoresque "wall of sound" approach utilizing overdubs of dozens of instruments, including over 20 different kinds of percussion.

The lyrical content of the songs continued to be heavily influenced by a Romantic sensibility (as in the works of Wordsworth, Keats, Shelley and Byron) coupled with Tolkien-esque fantasy imagery, as displayed in The Warlock of Love, Bolan's first book of poetry printed just prior to the release of Unicorn. As with his poetry, the words to songs on the album are difficult to decipher directly, being dependent on fantastic, dreamlike imagery such as "the toad road licked my wheel like a sabre" or "darkly ghostist host, haggard vizier of the moats." "Catblack (The Wizard's Hat)" originally stemmed from a fall 1966 demo with different lyrics, with chords mirroring oldies records like "Runaround Sue"; Bolan also claimed the piano part was brought in to further appeal to rock'n'roll fans. "Nijinsky Hind" was the author's tribute to the famed Russian ballet dancer who had been huge then "gone mad", which Marc compared to Syd Barrett's rise and fall. Meanwhile, "Romany Soup" referred to a dish Marc had recently enjoyed while on holiday in Cornwall, whose lyrics consisted of a single line repeated like a mantra.

Recording sessions began on 5 November with "Evenings of Damask", "The Seal of Seasons and "'Pon a Hill" committed to tape, although a satisfactory take of "Damask" proved elusive. On 14 November, "Warlord of the Royal Crocodiles", "The Sea Beasts" and "Throat of Winter" were completed briskly in 2-4 takes each. Sessions resumed on New Year's Day 1969 with "Stones for Avalon" and "Nijinksy Hind", the latter taking 9 takes for the master. 9 January saw "Catblack (The Wizard's Hat)", "Chariots of Silk" and "The Misty Coast of Albany" committed to tape, while a mid-January session yielded "The Pilgrim's Tale", "Like A White Star..." and "Iscariot". The album's final session on 2 February produced "She Was Born to be My Unicorn" and "Romany Soup" as well as extensive overdubs on other tracks, including the Visconti piano part on "Catblack". "Romany Soup" alone features 22 different overdubs, climaxing the album with a massive wall of sound.

In between the final two songs on the album, "The Misty Coast of Albany" and "Romany Soup", John Peel (an early supporter of the band) recited another part of Bolan's "Woodland Story", a short story whose first part had been recited by Peel at the close of the first album. Non-LP single "Pewter Suitor" was also recorded at the 14 November session, although it failed to chart on its January 1969 release.

== Album cover ==
The album's front and back cover photos were credited to Pete Sanders and shot in the kitchen of the flat he shared with John Peel. The back cover depicted Bolan and Took surrounded by books that were relevant to the subject matter of the songs. These books included the work of William Blake and a copy of Children's Shakespeare as well as photographs of the Cottingley Fairies, a famous case of two children's photographs of alleged fairies taken near their Yorkshire home. The album also featured a gatefold with the lyrics printed over a painting of two unicorn heads facing each other in side profile; the UK gatefold was in black and white while the US release had the painting in color.

== Release ==
Unicorn was released on 16 May 1969 by Regal Zonophone in the UK and Blue Thumb in the US; it was their first album to be released in the US. It reached number 12 in the UK Albums Chart, the duo's highest position to date. In November 1972, at the height of T. Rextasy, the album was combined with A Beard of Stars as a double album repackage by Cube Records, which charted at number 44 in the UK.

Unicorn was the last of Tyrannosaurus Rex's albums to feature Took; Bolan fired him after the completion of an American tour in September 1969, refusing to include Took's songs on the next album.

In 2004, the album was remastered and reissued by A&M Records with 15 bonus tracks. In 2015, a two-disc deluxe edition was released by A&M in Europe with the first disc containing the remastered album along with non-LP tracks and a BBC radio session on disc one, with studio outtakes on disc two.

== Critical reception and legacy ==
Professional ratings
Review scores
Source	Rating
AllMusic	3/5 stars
New Musical Express	3.5/5 stars
Uncut	2/5 stars

The album was initially received with the duo's best reviews to date. Nick Logan of New Musical Express called it "a happy warming sound, absorbing, refreshing and stimulating" while Melody Maker declared it their most interesting to date, singling out "Catblack (The Wizard's Hat)" as "one of the best tunes that Marc has written". Record Mirror also labeled it fresh and unique, comparing it favorably to the "unoriginal top-heavy guitar-based groups" popular at the time.

In a retrospective review, AllMusic praised most of the songs, saying "Cat Black" "comes on like a lost Spector classic, with apoplectic percussion and a positively soaring, wordless chorus". The reviewer also notes that some songs predated the transition from acoustic to electric music, remarking "you can hear the future". Julian Cope's site Head Heritage noted "the interweaving vocal shrieks, screams and yelps of both Bolan and Took merging seamlessly, whilst simultaneously creating meaning from incompressible improvisations and almost mystical religion chants. All of this further combined alongside those surreal, fairy-tale-like lyrical vignettes to create an album that takes us on an enthralling, colourful and continually imaginative little journey..." before noting the album's influence on the current wave of psych-folk, nu-folk, and anti-folk acts.

Songwriter and musician Luke Haines of the Auteurs dubbed it a "genius" album and praised Took for his contributions to the record.

== Track listing ==
All tracks are written by Marc Bolan.

Side A
No.	Title	Length
1.	"Chariots of Silk"	2:26
2.	"'Pon a Hill"	1:14
3.	"The Seal of Seasons"	1:49
4.	"The Throat of Winter"	1:59
5.	"Catblack (The Wizard's Hat)"	2:55
6.	"Stones for Avalon"	1:37
7.	"She Was Born to Be My Unicorn"	2:37
8.	"Like a White Star, Tangled and Far, Tulip That's What You Are"	3:49

Side B
No.	Title	Length
1.	"Warlord of the Royal Crocodiles"	2:11
2.	"Evenings of Damask"	2:26
3.	"The Sea Beasts"	2:26
4.	"Iscariot"	2:53
5.	"Nijinsky Hind"	2:20
6.	"The Pilgrim's Tale"	2:07
7.	"The Misty Coast of Albany"	1:43
8.	"Romany Soup"	5:40

2004 reissue bonus tracks
No.	Title	Length
17.	"Pewter Suitor" (single A-side)	3:10
18.	"King of the Rumbling Spires" (single A-side)	2:08
19.	"Do You Remember" (single B-side)	2:15
20.	"'Pon a Hill" (Take 1)	1:14
21.	"The Seal of Seasons" (Take 1)	1:40
22.	"The Throat of Winter" (Take 1)	1:46
23.	"She Was Born to Be My Unicorn" (Take 1)	2:38
24.	"Warlord of the Royal Crocodiles" (Take 1)	2:11
25.	"Evenings of Damask" (Take 5)	2:16
26.	"Iscariot" (Take 3)	1:58
27.	"The Misty Coast of Albany" (Take 1)	1:40
28.	"Romany Soup" (Take 2)	1:40
29.	"Pewter Suitor" (Take 1)	3:16
30.	"King of the Rumbling Spires" (Take 7)	2:45
31.	"Do You Remember" (Take 3)	2:17

== Personnel ==
Tyrannosaurus Rex

- Marc Bolan – acoustic and electric guitars, lead vocals, harmonium, organ, phonofiddle
- Steve Peregrin Took – drums, bongos, backing vocals, African talking drum, gong, percussion, pixiphone, bass guitar, piano

Additional personnel

- Tony Visconti – production, piano (A5)
- John Peel – narration (B8)
