= A Beard of Stars =

Studio album by Tyrannosaurus Rex
- Released: 13 March 1970
- Recorded: 29 April – 13 November 1969
- Studios: Trident, London
- Genres: Psychedelic folk; folk rock; psychedelic rock
- Length: 35:03
- Label: Regal Zonophone
- Producer: Tony Visconti

Tyrannosaurus Rex chronology
| Unicorn (1969) | A Beard of Stars (1970) | T. Rex (1970) |

Singles from A Beard of Stars
- 1. "By the Light of a Magical Moon" Released: 1970

A Beard of Stars is the fourth studio album by English psychedelic folk band Tyrannosaurus Rex, and their last before changing their name to T. Rex. It was released in March 1970 by record label Regal Zonophone.

== Background ==
Tyrannosaurus Rex's previous album, Unicorn, had been relatively successful, which encouraged Bolan to go electric. In March 1969, he bought an electric guitar which he proceeded to use on both sides of the July single "King of the Rumbling Spires / Do You Remember". Although it barely charted at number 44, Bolan wished to press further with his musical evolution but felt hamstrung by deteriorating relations with his partner, percussionist Steve Peregrin Took, who was involved heavily with drugs and wanted to contribute songs to the group's next album. Initial sessions for the new album in the spring of 1969 were fraught with tension. In response to Bolan's rebuff of his songs, Took contributed two of them as well as vocals and percussion to Twink's Think Pink album. After an American tour in August and September of 1969, Took was let go from the group, and Bolan placed an ad in Melody Maker looking for a replacement. By mid-October, he had found Mickey Finn through his housemate (and photographer for the band's album covers) Pete Sanders, and sessions for the next album resumed on 31 October.

== Songs and recording ==
A Beard of Stars was the act's first album with the new lineup and featured Bolan on vocals, guitar, organ and bass with Finn on percussion and bass. It is notable for being the first album on which Bolan played an electric guitar, although that instrument had first appeared on the band's 1969 single "King of the Rumbling Spires" / "Do You Remember". According to Mark Deming of AllMusic, A Beard of Stars "was the turning point where Marc Bolan began evolving from an unrepentant hippie into the full-on swaggering rock star he would be within a couple of years, though for those not familiar with his previous work, it still sounds like the work of a man with his mind plugged into the age of lysergic enchantment".

Four tracks from this album - two of which were "Great Horse" and "Wind Cheetah" - were salvaged from May 1969 sessions for a fourth album with original percussionist Steve Peregrin Took in the wake of "King of the Rumbling Spires". These tracks were later overdubbed for release by Finn, Bolan and Visconti, with Took's parts mixed out entirely. A further four tracks from the spring sessions – rejected for the final album – subsequently surfaced on various compilations, three ("Once Upon the Seas of Abyssinia", "Blessed Wild Apple Girl," "Demon Queen") in Bolan's lifetime, the fourth ("Ill Starred Man") posthumously.

After a period of rehearsal at Plas Tan Y Bwlch cottage in Wales, sessions resumed at Trident with Mickey Finn on 31 October and finished on 13 November. As with all previous Tyrannosaurus Rex albums, Tony Visconti sat in the producer's chair and later remarked in his autobiography that "The album was made in a really good atmosphere, helped no end by Finn’s positive spirit, which all led to the sessions being very creative and experimental." Marc ended up playing most of the instruments on the record, with Finn contributing minimal additional percussion. The new music was still primarily acoustic based but somewhat simpler and more direct, with more obvious hooks now accentuated by electric guitar and bass. While lyrical content was still heavily grounded in Romantic poetry and Tolkien fantasy imagery, Bolan's enunciation was deliberately easier to understand. During a BBC concert taped on New Year's Day 1970, Bolan introduced "Dove" as his first love song.

The first session with Finn on 31 October yielded "A Day Laye", "Fist Heart Mighty Dawn Dart", "Organ Blues" and the instrumental title track; all songs were completed within two takes except for "Organ Blues", which took six takes and did not yield a master. Work continued on "Organ Blues" on 3 November while "Lofty Skies" and "By the Light of a Magical Moon" were recorded on 7 November; the first two takes of "By the Light of a Magical Moon" were all-electric, similar to how the song was performed live. A session on the 12th yielded "Prelude", "Dove" and "Dragon's Ear" (recorded in two parts) as well as the master for "Organ Blues". The final session on 13 November saw "Pavilions of Sun", "Woodland Bop", "Find A Little Wood", and "Elemental Child" committed to tape. "Find A Little Wood" would not appear on the album, being consigned to the flip side of "By the Light of a Magical Moon" released in January 1970. The album's closing track, "Elemental Child", saw the main body of the song recorded separately from its extended guitar coda, with the two parts then joined in editing. The track, along with "Woodland Bop", "Pavilions of Sun" and "By The Light of a Magical Moon" represented Bolan's increasing desire to play electric rock and as such pointed to his future; he claimed to have taken informal guitar lessons from Eric Clapton in the leadup to its composition.

== Album cover ==
The front and back cover photography is credited to Pete Sanders, with Bolan's face gracing the front and Finn's face on the back. The album contained an insert featuring the lyrics over the photograph of a figurine of a boy playing a pan flute; in America this appeared as a gatefold.

== Release ==
A Beard of Stars was released in March 1970 by Regal Zonophone in the UK and Blue Thumb in the US. It reached No. 21 in the UK Albums Chart. The album had been preceded in January 1970 by the fifth and final Tyrannosaurus Rex single "By the Light of a Magical Moon", although it failed to chart. In November 1972, at the height of T. Rextasy, the album was combined with Unicorn as a double album repackage by Cube Records, which charted at number 44 in the UK.

In 2004, the album was remastered and reissued by A&M Records with 16 bonus tracks. In 2014, a two-disc deluxe edition was released by A&M in Europe with the first disc containing the remastered album along with non-LP tracks and a BBC radio session on disc one, with a plethora of demos and studio outtakes on disc two.

== Reception ==
Professional ratings
Review scores
| Source | Rating |
|---|---|
| AllMusic | 4/5 stars |
| New Musical Express | 3.5/5 stars |
| Uncut | 4/5 stars |

UK critics were generally favorable to the transition in sound, with Nick Logan of New Musical Express opining that the new electric guitar embellishments were employed with taste and discretion, resulting in the duo's most successful album to date. Chris Welch of Melody Maker declared "never before has T. Rex sounded so heavy or exciting", singling out "Elemental Child" for praise. There were fewer reviews of the album than before, however, with some fans having assumed Tyrannosaurus Rex to have split up after Took left. The band subsequently undertook an expansive spring tour of the UK to acquaint audiences with the new lineup and sound.

In a retrospective review, AllMusic praised the album as a "Grand Transformation. A Beard of Stars holds on to the charm of Tyrannosaurus Rex's early work while letting Bolan's natural charisma and rock moves finally take hold, and it's a unique and very pleasing entry in their catalog". In a review for Uncut, Graeme Thomson notes "It’s a quietly auspicious record, what with the arrival of Mickey Finn on percussion, and the addition of electric guitar to the mix. The result is an odd, repetitive, but not displeasing collision between fey folkabilly – princes, moons and dragons remain consistent preoccupations – and the seeds of something meaner and leaner." In another positive review, Paul Sexton at Udiscover writes "It was clear that Marc Bolan was ready to become the pop star figurehead and idol he soon turned into."

== Track listing ==
All tracks are written by Marc Bolan.

Side A
| No. | Title | Length |
|---|---|---|
| 1. | "Prelude" | 1:04 |
| 2. | "A Day Laye" | 1:56 |
| 3. | "Woodland Bop" | 1:39 |
| 4. | "Fist Heart Mighty Dawn Dart" | 2:45 |
| 5. | "Pavilions of Sun" | 2:49 |
| 6. | "Organ Blues" | 2:47 |
| 7. | "By the Light of a Magical Moon" | 2:51 |
| 8. | "Wind Cheetah" | 2:38 |

Side B
| No. | Title | Length |
|---|---|---|
| 1. | "A Beard of Stars" | 1:37 |
| 2. | "Great Horse" | 1:42 |
| 3. | "Dragon's Ear" | 2:37 |
| 4. | "Lofty Skies" | 2:54 |
| 5. | "Dove" | 2:06 |
| 6. | "Elemental Child" | 5:33 |

== Personnel ==
Tyrannosaurus Rex

- Marc Bolan - acoustic and electric guitars, lead vocals, chord organ, bass
- Mickey Finn - Moroccan clay drums, backing vocals, tabla, finger cymbals, bass

Technical

- Malcolm Toft - engineer
- Tony Visconti - piano, producer

== Charts ==
| Chart (1970) | Peak position |
|---|---|
| Australia (Kent Music Report) | 27 |
| UK Albums Chart | 21 |
