= Hot Love (T. Rex song) =

- Cover of the original 7" vinyl single

Single by T. Rex
- B-side: "Woodland Rock"; "King of the Mountain Cometh"
- Released: 12 February 1971
- Recorded: 21–22 January 1971
- Studio: Trident, London
- Genre: Glam rock
- Length: 4:53 (album version); 3:16 (single edit)
- Label: Fly
- Songwriter: Marc Bolan
- Producer: Tony Visconti

T. Rex singles chronology
"Ride a White Swan" (1970)	"Hot Love" (1971)	"Get It On" (1971)

"Hot Love" is a song by English glam rock band T. Rex, released as a standalone single on 12 February 1971 by record label Fly. It was the group's first number one on the UK Singles Chart, where it remained for six weeks beginning on 14 March 1971.

The two performances of the song on Top of the Pops in March 1971, which saw Marc Bolan dressed for the first time on television in shiny satin stagewear and glittery make-up (the latter at the suggestion of his stylist Chelita Secunda) were a crucial trigger for the glam rock movement.

== Background and recording ==
"Hot Love" was first heard in December 1970 as part of a BBC Radio 1 broadcast in a version much rawer, slower, and more relaxed than the eventual release. The single was subsequently recorded at Trident Studios on 21 and 22 January 1971, with overdubs on 26 January. The single's B-sides, "Woodland Rock" and "The King of the Mountain Cometh", were recorded onto the same 16-track tape.

The A-side, along with the B-side "Woodland Rock", marks the first time a full drum kit appeared on a T. Rex song, after Bill Fifield participated in the session at Tony Visconti's suggestion. The single was issued and, due to its success, Fifield was invited to audition to join the band, adopting the stage name Bill Legend. "King of the Mountain Cometh", initially begun during July 1970 sessions for the T. Rex album, is the only track ever on record by the Bolan/Finn/Currie trio, although officially they were the whole band for all three tracks on this record.

"Hot Love" also marked the debut of Flo & Eddie backing vocals on a T. Rex record. Eddie (Howard Kaylan) had already appeared on "Seagull Woman" from 1970's T. Rex but this was Flo's (Mark Volman's) first appearance. During the backing vocal overdub session on January 26, the tapes reveal Bolan mentioning that the group's last single, "Ride a White Swan", had hit number 2 in the UK chart.

== Release and reception ==
“Hot Love” was released as a single on 12 February 1971 by record label Fly. It followed from the success of "Ride a White Swan" to become the group's first number one placing on the UK Singles Chart, where it remained at the top for six weeks beginning in March 1971. The single, however, did not fare as well in the US, where it peaked at number 72 on the Billboard Hot 100 and at number 54 on the Cash Box Top 100. The song reached number 47 in Canada in June 1971 and number 12 in South Africa. It also charted in Australia at number 4, spending 24 weeks on the KMR charts, entering on the 19 April 1971. On the New Zealand Listener charts it reached number 7.

The single received near-unanimous praise from UK critics, with many noting the new highly commercial sound and predicting it would be a big hit. Chris Welch of Melody Maker noted it was "a sound to appeal to all pop purists", while Derek Johnson of NME felt listeners would be compelled to sing along. Penny Valentine of Sounds called it "a real smoothie of a commercial number". Peter Jones of Record Mirror noted that the song was "built around a rolling slice of rhythmic development and the vocal side is both relaxed and urgent."

In a 2015 UK poll, it was voted eleventh on the ITV special The Nation's Favourite 70s Number One.

== Use in advertising and films ==
"Hot Love" featured in the 1996 film Breaking the Waves and the 1998 film The Acid House.

The song featured in the Christmas 2020 advertising campaign for the on-line retailer Very.

== Personnel ==
Permanent band members:

- Marc Bolan – lead vocals, guitar
- Steve Currie – bass guitar
- Mickey Finn – handclaps

Other:

- Bill Fifield – drums
- Tony Visconti – string arrangement
- Howard Kaylan and Mark Volman – backing vocals

== Other sources ==
- Roberts, David (2006). British Hit Singles & Albums. London, England: Guinness World Records Limited. ISBN 1-904994-10-5.
