= Bill Legend =

British glam rock drummer (born 1944)

- Born: William Arthur Fifield; 8 May 1944 (age 82); Barking, Essex, England
- Genres: Glam rock; boogie rock; blues rock; power pop; psychedelic soul
- Occupation: Musician
- Instrument: Drums
- Years active: 1970s
- Formerly of: T. Rex; Legend; X-T. Rex

Bill Legend (born William Arthur Fifield; 8 May 1944) is an English musician and former drummer for glam rock band T. Rex during their most successful period. His life and career have been discussed in multiple published books and other works about the band.

== Biography ==
One of three children, Legend worked as a commercial artist after leaving school, while playing the drums in a variety of bands. He was drumming under his real name for a group called "Legend", fronted by Mickey Jupp, when Marc Bolan, the man behind the new-found success of T. Rex, spotted him and asked producer Tony Visconti to approach him.

Legend agreed to join T. Rex, immediately buying a number of the band's albums from their days as Tyrannosaurus Rex to familiarise himself with Bolan's previous work. At the time, T. Rex had enjoyed their first hit single with "Ride a White Swan". Bolan and his percussionist Mickey Finn had already recruited a bassist in Steve Currie, but still needed a drummer to complete the rhythm section of their new electric line-up. At Legend's first session, he played drums on "Hot Love" and the B-side "Woodland Rock". However, T. Rex stayed as a three-piece band for a short period, forcing Finn to mime playing the drums on Top of the Pops when "Hot Love" was at No. 1.

Bolan suggested Legend's stage name, which was derived from the name of the band he had been playing in with Mickey Jupp. Legend played drums for T. Rex on four albums: Electric Warrior, The Slider, Tanx and Zinc Alloy and the Hidden Riders of Tomorrow. The band had four UK No. 1 singles and four UK No. 2 singles in a three-year period, after which it began to disintegrate as the hits dried up. Legend reverted to session drumming afterwards.

Despite signing a petition against the 1997 formation of Mickey Finn's T-Rex, Legend had his own tribute band called X-T. Rex. He recruited lead vocalist Danny McCoy, lead guitarist Ross McEwen, keyboardist Lee Swindon and bassist Stuart McArthur to complete the lineup. They completed a tour of Europe and were expected to release an album titled Mover and the Groover despite T. Rex fans, including David Bowie being unhappy about a new album under a slightly different name from the original band.

Legend is the only surviving member of any T. Rex or Tyrannosaurus Rex line-up from August 1967 to June 1973. Bolan (in 1977) and Currie (in 1981) both died in car crashes, and Finn succumbed to illness in 2003. Finn's predecessor Steve Peregrin Took choked to death in 1980.
