= Ride a White Swan =

Single by T. Rex
- B-side: "Is It Love?"; "Summertime Blues"
- Released: 9 October 1970
- Recorded: 1 July 1970
- Genre: Glam rock; rock and roll
- Length: 2:14
- Label: Fly
- Songwriter: Marc Bolan
- Producer: Tony Visconti

T. Rex singles chronology
"By the Light of a Magical Moon" (1970)	"Ride a White Swan" (1970)	"Hot Love" (1971)

Official audio
- "Ride a White Swan" on YouTube

"Ride a White Swan" is a song by English band T. Rex. It was released as a stand-alone single on 9 October 1970 by record label Fly, and was the first single credited under the band's new name. It was written by the group's singer, guitarist and founder Marc Bolan. The song was included on the US version of the 1970 album, T. Rex.

The song was the band's first significant hit, and, according to Ned Raggett of AllMusic, the song "inadvertently founded glam rock mania", although Bolan did not wear characteristic glam stage clothing until the promotion of the follow up single "Hot Love".

== Background and recording ==
In spring 1969, after three acoustic Tyrannosaurus Rex albums and an equal number of singles released to limited appeal, Bolan began to make the transition from basing his band's sound around an acoustic guitar to an electric. The new sound was premiered on single "King of the Rumbling Spires" and tracks were recorded for a planned fourth album, before Bolan replaced percussionist Steve Peregrin Took with Mickey Finn following a US tour. Shortly thereafter, the new duo completed the fourth album A Beard of Stars (including some material salvaged from the final Took sessions). This was released in early 1970. Later that year a fifth album, T. Rex, was recorded under the band's new shortened name of T. Rex.

"Ride a White Swan", a simple four-stanza lyric with the second repeated as the fourth, was written in Bolan's West London home that he shared with his wife June Ellen Child. In 1976, Bolan suggested that he wrote the song after he was spiked with LSD at the launch of the British version of Rolling Stone magazine in Hanover Square, Westminster. The song, which was brimming with mythological references, was recorded on 1 July 1970. It was less than two minutes long and contained four layered guitar tracks, with Bolan also playing Tony Visconti's Fender Precision bass, with a capo placed on the fourth fret. It included a small string section but no drums, with time being kept with a synchronised tambourine and clap recorded in the bathroom of Trident Studios, London. This location was chosen for the ambient room echo. To extend the song to two and a quarter minutes, Tony Visconti looped Marc Bolan's "da da dee dee dah" vocal line at the end of the song, six times.

On the single's B-side, "Is It Love?" was recorded in June 1970 and "Summertime Blues", a cover of a popular Eddie Cochran rockabilly hit was recorded at the same session as "Ride a White Swan". Studio notes indicate the song "Jewel", which later appeared on the T. Rex album, was prepared at Trident Studios on 26 July 1970 for inclusion as the single's B-side.

== Release and reception ==
The song entered the UK singles top 50 on 24 October 1970, released on the record label Fly. Tyrannosaurus Rex had appeared in the lower reaches of the UK Top 40 on two previous occasions, but were little-known among music fans. The progress of "Ride a White Swan" was slow but steady; it entered the Top 40 on 31 October but it wasn't until 11 weeks later – on 23 January 1971 – that it reached a peak position of number 2. It was ultimately a novelty record by Dad's Army actor Clive Dunn – "Grandad" – which stopped "Ride a White Swan" from completing its climb to the top. The climb was made all the more remarkable by the song dropping a whole six places out of the Top 10 in the week leading up to Christmas 1970, only to find a second wind in the New Year. In the Cash Box Top 100 it reached #60 in February 1971 as well. On the Hot 100, "Ride a White Swan" went to #76. The song was released from Blue Thumb Records in Canada. On the New Zealand Listener charts it reached number 9.

Many UK critics were pleasantly surprised by the shortened name change and newly commercial sound. Derek Johnson of NME noted "an excellent sound...fine stuff indeed" while Chris Welch of Melody Maker stated that the song recaptured the simple drive of late 50s pop and predicted "this must be a hit, or I'll eat my toadstool." Meanwhile in America, Paul Gambaccini of Rolling Stone enthused that it was "a good record, a clever record and a soon to be successful record."

"Ride a White Swan" made Bolan a star and boosted T. Rex's fame and reputation, paving the way for its follow-up single "Hot Love" to climb to number 1 for six weeks as the phenomenon of glam rock took hold. At this point, Bolan introduced bassist Steve Currie and, prior to the next single and a major tour, recruited drummer Bill Legend to complete the line-up which remains the representation of T. Rex's halcyon era. The band would ultimately enjoy four number 1 singles and four number 2 singles in the UK by the end of 1972.

== Performances ==
Bolan performed the song twice on Top of the Pops with Mickey Finn miming bass, performances which were a major contribution to the single's success. At this point, Bolan had not yet started wearing Glam fashions onstage and instead wore dungarees for one performance.

For one performance six years after its first release, on ITV's Supersonic in 1976, he was standing in a large swan model, unusually not holding a guitar. As this was during Bolan's brief "Bolantino" phase, his corkscrew hair was also gone.

== Legacy ==
"Ride a White Swan" is considered to have heralded the glam rock movement.

When Bolan died in a car crash in 1977, T. Rex's management paid tribute to Bolan by laying a large white swan made of flowers among the floral tributes on display at Golders Green Crematorium in North London, where his funeral was held.

The song is one of many T. Rex tracks which feature in the film Billy Elliot.

An alternative take of the song is featured in the video game Lego Rock Band.

== Track listing ==
All tracks are written by Marc Bolan, except "Summertime Blues", written by Eddie Cochran and Jerry Capeheart.

Side A
No.	Title	Length
1.	"Ride a White Swan"	2:14

Side B
No.	Title	Length
1.	"Is It Love?"	2:36
2.	"Summertime Blues"	2:44

== Certifications ==
Region	Certification	Certified units/sales
United Kingdom (BPI)	Silver	200,000^{‡}
^{‡} Sales+streaming figures based on certification alone.
