= Electric Warrior =

Studio album by T. Rex
- Released: 24 September 1971
- Recorded: March–June 1971
- Studios: Trident and Advision, London; Wally Heider, Hollywood; Mediasound, New York City
- Genres: Glam rock; boogie rock; blues rock
- Length: 39:35
- Labels: Fly (UK); Reprise (US)
- Producer: Tony Visconti

T. Rex chronology
T. Rex (1970)	Electric Warrior (1971)	The Slider (1972)

Singles from Electric Warrior
- 1. "Get It On" Released: 2 July 1971; 2. "Jeepster" Released: 5 November 1971

Electric Warrior is the second studio album by English rock band T. Rex and their sixth since their 1968 debut as Tyrannosaurus Rex, released on 24 September 1971, by Fly Records in the United Kingdom and Reprise Records in the United States. The album marked a turning point in the band's style, moving away from the folk-oriented sound of the group's previous albums and pioneering a more flamboyant, pop-oriented glam rock style.

The album reached number one on the UK Albums Chart. The single "Get It On" helped to boost the album's sales and it reached the top ten of the US Billboard Hot 100 chart. Retitled "Bang a Gong (Get It On)" by the US record company, it also became the band's only North American hit. Electric Warrior has since received acclaim as a pivotal release in the glam rock movement. It had a profound influence on later musicians of different genres.

== Background ==
As T. Rex re-entered the studio to record their next album in March 1971, the band was riding a wave of sudden success prompted by their first single, "Ride a White Swan", hitting number 2 in the UK charts that January, followed by "Hot Love" which topped the charts for six straight weeks through March and April. While promoting "Hot Love" on Top of the Pops on 24 March, Marc Bolan had appeared in a silver satin suit with glitter under his eyes, sparking the glam rock craze. At the same time, the self-titled debut T. Rex album peaked within the top 10 and demand for the group's concert appearances soared. The group now set their sights on the United States, where a month-long tour was set for April (the first with a new four-man lineup, including newest member Bill Legend on drums) during which they would end up recording much of Electric Warrior.

== Songs and recording ==
The lyrics on the new album marked a dramatic departure from the dense Romantic poeticism and Tolkien fantasy imagery of Bolan's first five albums, including the most recent T. Rex album. Bolan explained that he was now writing about himself for the first time, songs he described as personal and "erotic". Fantastic imagery was still present, only now presented with a new stripped-down immediacy that was fused with basic rock'n'roll imagery of cars, women, and boogie. Musically, the album continued the electric pop/rock sound of T. Rex, recently expanded to a four-piece band with full bass and drums; only three songs retained primarily acoustic arrangements. Sonic tricks employed on the album identified by producer Tony Visconti, which had been gradually developed over the past five albums, included flanging, reverb, backwards guitars, tape loops, and plugging the guitar directly into the console to overload the mike preamplifiers. In addition, session players included Yes maestro Rick Wakeman on piano ("Get It On"), jazz trumpeter Burt Collins on flugelhorn ("Girl") and King Crimson's Ian McDonald on sax ("Rip Off"), along with a string section and ex-Turtles Flo & Eddie on androgynous backing vocals, which when fused together created a highly distinctive sound.

Initial work on the album began on 5 March at Trident Studios in London, where the previous albums had been recorded, with an early version of "Planet Queen" put to tape. On 16 March, similarly rough versions of "Mambo Sun" and "Cosmic Dancer" were laid down with no producer present and no particular plan for an album yet. Remakes of the latter two songs were attempted at Trident on 30 March, with early takes of "Cosmic Dancer" featuring Bolan on a Fender Stratocaster before feeling the sound was wrong and switching to an acoustic. Once in America for the tour, the group met with producer Visconti for sessions at Wally Heider Studios in Hollywood, with Howard Kaylan and Mark Volman of Flo & Eddie participating on backing vocals. On 18 April, the band ran through "Get It On", "Monolith" and a remake of "Planet Queen". Sessions then moved, with Visconti, to Mediasound Studios in New York City on 27 April where working versions of "Jeepster", "Lean Woman Blues" and "Girl" (with the working titles "Oh God" and "Electric Witch") were finished. Visconti later remarked that the relaxed pace of recording in America, where there was no definite goal or pressure to make an album, contributed to the unique feel of the songs.

Once back in England, extensive mixing of the work done in America proceeded at AIR Studios on 3 May. At this point, realizing they had stockpiled a large number of strong tracks, Bolan and Visconti decided to shape it into an album. On 12 May, at Advision, "The Motivator", "Rip Off" and possibly "Life's A Gas" were recorded, with early takes of "Rip Off" opening with its guitar riff until it was decided on take 3 to open with drums. The next day at Advision was devoted to overdubs on "Jeepster" and "Lean Woman Blues", with final overdubs to "Rip Off" and the taping of two new songs destined for B-side release, "There Was a Time" and "Raw Ramp/Electric Boogie", in early June. On 21 July, a master tape of the album was compiled back at Trident, although it featured a different running order of songs.

== Artwork ==
The cover artwork was designed by English art design group Hipgnosis, based on a photo taken by Kieron "Spud" Murphy of Marc Bolan at a T. Rex concert in Nottingham on 14 May 1971. The image is printed in metallic gold on a matte black background, at least for the original UK issue on Fly Records and the first German issue on Ariola. In early July, Murphy also took the photo of the band relaxing in Bolan's flat that was used for the poster that was included with the first issue in the UK and Germany. A hype sticker ("free T. Rex poster inside") advertised the poster in the UK. Some hype stickers for modern "remastering" campaigns are designed in a similar style as the original hype sticker. The poster picture was used for the gatefold of the US issue on Reprise Records. The inner sleeve artwork of the UK issue, portraits of Marc Bolan and Mickey Finn, was drawn by artist George Underwood, who had drawn the artwork for the first Tyrannosaurus Rex album in 1968, My People Were Fair and Had Sky in Their Hair... But Now They're Content to Wear Stars on Their Brows. The first German Ariola issue used the inner sleeve artwork for the gatefold.

The artwork served as the inspiration for the French electronic duo Justice, who paid homage in the design of their debut studio album, †.

== Promotion ==
T. Rex heavily promoted Electric Warrior through a string of tours, interviews, radio, and TV appearances through late 1971 and early 1972. Besides multiple appearances on Top of the Pops the group also appeared on European shows like Beat-Club, Starparade and Hits A Go-Go. A fall 1971 tour of the UK provoked scenes of fan hysteria unprecedented since the heyday of Beatlemania, causing the press to dub the new craze "T. Rextasy". A short US tour in February 1972 of mid-sized venues proved moderately successful as "Get It On", redubbed "Bang a Gong" for the American market, became the group's only top ten hit in that country.

Marc Bolan, in a 1971 interview contained on the Rhino Records reissue, said of the album, "I think Electric Warrior, for me, is the first album which is a statement of 1971 for us in England. I mean that's... If anyone ever wanted to know why we were big in the other part of the world, that album says it, for me." In another interview that year responding to charges that his music had "sold out" to commercialism, he stated "We didn't sell out or change the music; the music's the same. It's just that now it's timed in the cosmos to be successful."

Bolan was a guest on the BBC Television show Cilla in January 1973, where he and Cilla Black sang an acoustic version of "Life's a Gas".

== Release ==
Electric Warrior was released on 24 September 1971 by record label Fly in the UK and Reprise in the US. It went to number 1 on the UK Albums Chart, staying at the slot for 8 weeks. The album remained in the UK chart for a total of 44 weeks. In the US, Electric Warrior reached number 32 in the Billboard 200 chart.

Two singles were released from the album: "Get It On" in July and "Jeepster" in November. "Get It On" was T. Rex's biggest selling single, staying four weeks at the top of the UK chart and becoming the band's only top-ten US hit. In the United States, "Get It On"'s title was originally changed to "Bang a Gong (Get It On)" to distinguish it from Chase's song "Get It On", which was also released in late 1971. "Jeepster" managed to reach number 2 in the UK although it was released by Fly without Bolan's permission, making him reluctant to promote it.

== Reception ==
=== Contemporary reviews ===
Professional ratings
Review scores
Source	Rating
AllMusic	5/5 stars
Christgau's Record Guide	B
Encyclopedia of Popular Music	5/5 stars
MusicOMH	4.5/5 stars
New Musical Express	5/5 stars
Pitchfork	9.5/10
Q	4/5 stars
Record Collector	5/5 stars
Uncut	5/5 stars

In a positive 1972 review for Rolling Stone, Ben Gerson noted Bolan's transition from his earlier fairytale lyrics, noting that now "his targets are your common rock & roll cliches, as well as your common pseudo-poetic, pseudo-philosophical rock & roll cliches [...] What Marc seems to be saying on Electric Warrior is that rock is ultimately as quaint as wizards and unicorns, and finally, as defunct. Gerson concluded that the album established Bolan as "the heaviest rocker under 5’4″ in the world today." The Village Voice critic Robert Christgau was reserved in his praise: "A freak hit turned [Bolan] into a singer of rhythmic fairy tales for British pre-pubes, exactly what he was always suited for, and the great 'Bang a Gong' extends his subject matter into the rock myth itself, which has its limits but sure beats unicorns. Now if he'd only recycle a few more pop readymades I could stop complaining about fey."

Over in Bolan's home country of the UK, the album was received with near-unanimous acclaim. Nick Logan at NME remarked that Bolan had "drawn upon the range of rock and roll influences that is the diet of any child of rock, impress them with his own individual penchant for lyrics and a finely tuned producer's ear, and drag them kicking and screaming into '71". Chris Welch at Melody Maker gushed that "Marc's music is getting better all the time" while Martin Hayman of Sounds claimed it was "all down to the new, dynamic T. Rex of their recent single releases, with a much fuller, stronger sound than before". Val Mabbs of Record Mirror called it by far the best album the group had made, also complimenting the cover art, poster, and illustrations in the gatefold sleeve.

=== Retrospective reviews ===
Retrospectively, Electric Warrior has received critical acclaim and is regarded as one of Marc Bolan's best works. Chris Jones of BBC Music called the album a "slice of pop heaven," and stated that "this was the point at which he and long-term producer Tony Visconti took the hippy-dippy lyrics and Larry the Lamb vocal stylings and bolted them on to good old stripped-down, four-to-the-floor rock 'n' roll." In his retrospective review, Steve Huey of AllMusic called it "the album that essentially kick-started the U.K. glam rock craze" and wrote that "the real reason Electric Warrior stands the test of time so well – despite its intended disposability – is that it revels so freely in its own absurdity and wilful lack of substance [...] Bolan's lack of pomposity, back-to-basics songwriting, and elaborate theatrics went on to influence everything from hard rock to punk to new wave." Brian James of Pitchfork called it "the first and best of a trio of brilliant albums," stating that "When T. Rex is kicking out the jams, they sound like they're having the most gleeful, absurd good time ever committed to wax," but adding that "the most significant aspect of Electric Warrior isn't its arena rock confidence; it's that Bolan allows his grinning mask to slip [...] On ballads like 'Cosmic Dancer', 'Monolith' and 'Girl', he speaks in the same gibberish as elsewhere, but he's clearly haunted-- by what we can't say."

=== Accolades ===
In 1987, Electric Warrior was ranked number 100 in Rolling Stone magazine's "100 Greatest Albums of the Last 20 Years" list. In 2003, the album was ranked number 160 by the same magazine in its list of the 500 greatest albums of all time, maintaining the rating in a 2012 revised list, and dropping to number 188 in a 2020 revised list. In 2004, Pitchfork ranked Electric Warrior as the 20th best album of the 1970s. The album was also included in the book 1001 Albums You Must Hear Before You Die. It was voted number 873 in the third edition of Colin Larkin's All Time Top 1000 Albums (2000).

== Legacy ==
The album is credited as the first glam rock album, pioneering the development of the glam scene.

The Jam's Paul Weller cited it as one of his all-time favourite records, hailing Bolan's guitar playing as "really unique. You know his sound instantly." Lol Tolhurst of the Cure said that the band listened to it during their formative years: "We were listening to T. Rex at this time,” [...] “I recall Robert [Smith] had a copy of Electric Warrior". The Slits's guitarist Viv Albertine also mentioned a special liking for this album for "the whole sound, the whole cartoony, sexual, and humourous [sic] thing, it's very English as well. I think Prince has taken so much from Bolan." The Bongos released a cover of “Mambo Sun” which hit number 74 on the Billboard Dance Club chart in April 1981. PJ Harvey's main collaborator John Parish included the album among his favourites: "when I'm working... I like to have a few records that are most important for me, which I periodically stick on to remind myself just how good records can be. [...] I have a duty to at least try and make something as sweet and irresistible as this". Bobby Gillespie of Primal Scream has cited "Get it On" as one of his all-time favorite pop songs, adding "When I was growing up, singles were an art statement. [...] People like [..] T. Rex were changing all the time. As a fan you wanted to know what they were going to wear and whether you could follow them to that new place".

== Use in media ==
"Cosmic Dancer" is featured prominently in the soundtrack of the final segment of the 2019 Netflix documentary Dancing with the Birds, in which a male Carola's parotia successfully woos a female into mating with his courtship display. It was also played in the opening sequence of the 2000 film Billy Elliot.

"Jeepster" can be heard playing on a jukebox in Quentin Tarantino's 2007 film Death Proof. "Planet Queen" and "Get it On" were both included in the soundtrack of the 2024 film Longlegs, which also featured several allusions and references to the music of T. Rex.

"Mambo Sun" is played towards the end of Karan Kandhari's 2025 film Sister Midnight.

== Track listing ==
All tracks are written by Marc Bolan.

Side A
No.	Title	Length
1.	"Mambo Sun"	3:40
2.	"Cosmic Dancer"	4:30
3.	"Jeepster"	4:12
4.	"Monolith"	3:49
5.	"Lean Woman Blues"	3:02
Total length:		18:33

Side B
No.	Title	Length
1.	"Get It On"	4:27
2.	"Planet Queen"	3:13
3.	"Girl"	2:32
4.	"The Motivator"	4:00
5.	"Life's a Gas"	2:24
6.	"Rip Off"	3:40
Total length:		19:36

Rhino Records reissue bonus tracks
No.	Title	Length
12.	"There Was a Time"	1:00
13.	"Raw Ramp"	4:16
14.	"Planet Queen" (Acoustic Version)	3:00
15.	"Hot Love"	4:59
16.	"Woodland Rock"	2:24
17.	"King of the Mountain Cometh"	3:57
18.	"The T. Rex Electric Warrior Interview"	19:35

30th Anniversary Special Edition bonus tracks
No.	Title	Length
12.	"Rip Off" (Work in Progress)	2:30
13.	"Mambo Sun" (Work in Progress)	3:57
14.	"Cosmic Dancer" (Work in Progress)	5:15
15.	"Monolith" (Work in Progress)	4:47
16.	"Bang A Gong (Get It On)"	4:43
17.	"Planet Queen" (Work in Progress)	0:56
18.	"The Motivator" (Work in Progress)	4:19
19.	"Life's a Gas" (Work in Progress)	3:14

== Personnel ==
=== T. Rex ===
- Marc Bolan – vocals, guitar
- Mickey Finn – congas, bongos, vocals
- Steve Currie – bass
- Bill Legend – drums, tambourine

=== Additional personnel ===
- Howard Kaylan – backing vocals
- Mark Volman – backing vocals
- Rick Wakeman – keyboards on "Get It On"
- Ian McDonald – saxophone
- Burt Collins – flugelhorn

=== Technical personnel ===
- Tony Visconti – production, string arrangements
- Roy Thomas Baker – engineering
- Martin Rushent – tape operator
- George Underwood – artwork, photography
- George Marino – mastering

== Charts ==
=== Weekly charts ===
Weekly chart performance for Electric Warrior
Chart (1971–1972)	Peak position
Australian Albums (Kent Music Report)	15
German Albums (Offizielle Top 100)	14
Norwegian Albums (VG-lista)	12
UK Albums Chart	1
US Billboard 200	32

=== Year-end charts ===
Year-end chart performance for Electric Warrior
Chart (1972)	Position
German Albums (Offizielle Top 100)	24

== Certifications ==
Certifications for Electric Warrior
Region	Certification	Certified units/sales
United Kingdom (BPI)	Gold	100,000^{‡}
United States (RIAA)	Gold	500,000^{‡}
^{‡} Sales+streaming figures based on certification alone.
