= Superspade =

Superspade is a term that has been used since the early 1900s to describe African Americans that were exceptionally gifted in different areas. The label was primarily given to athletes (e.g. Jesse Owens, Muhammad Ali) and entertainers (e.g. Jimi Hendrix, Sidney Poitier). The term was used to capture "the essence of what was expected of black folks. They had to be sensational." It stems from the notion that in order to be recognized, accepted and successful, individuals who were black had to outperform their white counterparts.
