= My People Were Fair and Had Sky in Their Hair... But Now They're Content to Wear Stars on Their Brows =

Studio album by Tyrannosaurus Rex
- Released: 5 July 1968
- Recorded: April 1968
- Studio: Advision, London
- Genre: Psychedelic folk; folk-pop
- Length: 33:18
- Label: Regal Zonophone
- Producer: Tony Visconti

Tyrannosaurus Rex chronology
| My People Were Fair and Had Sky in Their Hair... But Now They're Content to Wear Stars on Their Brows (1968) | Prophets, Seers & Sages: The Angels of the Ages (1968) |

My People Were Fair and Had Sky in Their Hair... But Now They're Content to Wear Stars on Their Brows is the debut album by English psychedelic folk band Tyrannosaurus Rex (later known as T. Rex). The release of the album was planned for early May but delayed until 5 July 1968 by record label Regal Zonophone.

== Background ==
When singer-songwriter and guitarist Marc Bolan left the mod band John's Children at the end of June 1967, he formed a new group, Tyrannosaurus Rex. After a disastrous debut gig as an electric four-piece at the Electric Garden club on 22 July, Bolan stripped the group down to an acoustic duo consisting of himself on vocals and guitar and Steve Peregrin Took on backing vocals and bongos. The group began to make a name for themselves on the underground circuit in London, appearing second or third on the bill at hippie clubs like Middle Earth and striking up a friendship with influential DJ John Peel, who put them on his BBC programme Top Gear that autumn. The group began looking for a record contract at this time, and were at first briefly courted by Track Records.

== Songs and recording ==
For Marc Bolan, the album's music represented a rejection of the electric guitar-driven music he had been playing with his previous band, John's Children. Two of its songs, "Mustang Ford" and "Hot Rod Mama" (in a live BBC radio session) had been recorded the year prior in electric versions by John's Children (the former retitled "Go Go Girl" after Bolan's departure). Acoustic demos of both songs appeared on The Beginning of Doves, a collection of early tracks recorded in 1966 and 1967 and released in 1974. An early live Tyrannosaurus Rex set list at Middle Earth on 23 September 1967 also features eight songs which would eventually appear on the album. When Track Records was courting the group, two recording sessions with producer Joe Boyd at Sound Techniques studios on 6 November and 8 December resulted in acetate versions of "Highways", "Child Star", "Dwarfish Trumpet Blues" and "Chateau In Virginia Waters", the latter featuring bassist Danny Thompson of the band Pentangle. However, negotiations with Track broke down and the duo did not sign a record contract until producer Tony Visconti discovered them in March 1968 and offered them a contract with the EMI label Regal Zonophone.

Preparatory demo sessions for the My People Were Fair album took place in late March at Visconti's London flat where the group ran through their set list twice, once on their own and then again with Visconti accompanying on bass. The album was eventually recorded over four days (two days for recording, two days for mixing) at Advision Studios in London, England in early April 1968 on a minuscule budget and produced by Visconti. Advision was one of the first studios in the UK with eight-channel recording equipment. This Advision unit was a model 280 made by Scully Recording Instruments and allowed for far greater recording flexibility than the standard 4-track recorders of the era. However, Bolan later complained that it was so new that no-one knew how to use it properly, resulting in an awful stereo mix that sounded "thin and nasty."

The all-acoustic record featured Bolan on vocals and acoustic guitar with Steve Peregrin Took on backing vocals, bongos, Chinese gong, pixiphone and percussion. It also featured disc jockey John Peel, who read a children's story written by Bolan for the album's closing track, "Frowning Atahuallpa (My Inca Love)", which also included a lengthy Hare Krishna chant. Elsewhere, the main character in the song "Scenescof" (literally, "to scoff at the scene") was described by Bolan as a villain with "illusions of taking over the minds of the younger generation". "Mustang Ford" would be the first of many future Bolan compositions about cars, while others like "Dwarfish Trumpet Blues" sounded far stranger with lines about solid silver genies emerging from a deaf, dumb and blind man's toy trumpet. The album premiered Bolan's new lyrical style, a mixture of dense Romantic wordplay and Tolkien-esque fantasy imagery which would come to dominate his work through 1970. The non-LP single "Debora" also came out of the sessions and hit the UK top 40 upon release in May.

== Title and album cover ==
The elaborate cover art painting by George Underwood dealt with the same fantasy themes as the lyrics, which would pervade much of the subsequent Tyrannosaurus Rex catalogue. Underwood's artwork was based on Gustave Doré's illustrations of Dante's Inferno. Journalist Paul Stewart advanced that the extended album title reflected "the faux mysticism of the time, even down to the dedication on the sleeve to Aslan and the Old Narnians" while biographer Mark Paytress wrote that the title and the songs "struck a chord with the whimsy-stricken elements within the British underground". The album was released with a front laminated flipback cover with a sheet insert, over which the lyrics were printed over a drawing of a fearsome Tyrannosaurus Rex.

On the back cover, John Peel told a fanciful story about the group emerging from the ashes of 1967's Summer of Love:

Tyrannosaurus Rex rose out of the sad and scattered leaves of an older summer. During the hard, grey winter they were tended and strengthened by those who love them. They blossomed with the coming of spring, children rejoiced and the earth sang with them. It will be a long and ecstatic summer.

== Release ==
My People Were Fair was released on 5 July 1968 by Regal Zonophone. It reached number 15 in the UK Albums Chart upon initial release, which allowed the duo to purchase new instruments and PA equipment.

In 1972, the album was paired with Tyrannosaurus Rex's follow-up album Prophets, Seers & Sages: The Angels of the Ages (1968) and reissued as a double LP, following the success of T. Rex's Electric Warrior (1971) album. The double album reached number 1 in the UK due to the immense popularity of Bolan and T. Rex at that point, a phenomenon coined "T. Rextasy" in the British press, despite it not featuring electric rock music as had the band's recent releases. It remains the longest album title of any UK number 1 album. In the US, it was released by A&M Records as Tyrannosaurus Rex: A Beginning.

In 1985, it was re-released on Sierra Records. An expanded edition CD was released in 2004, which included the mono mix of the album, one single track and three alternate studio takes. A new mono mix was created for a deluxe edition, released in January 2015, which also included home demos for the album recorded by Visconti and exploratory studio sessions with Boyd.

== Reception ==
Professional ratings
Review scores
| Source | Rating |
|---|---|
| AllMusic | 3/5 stars |
| New Musical Express | 2/5 stars |
| Sunday Express | 5/5 stars |
| Uncut | 3/5 stars |

Initial reception for the album in Bolan's home country was highly positive, with reviews in Melody Maker, New Musical Express and Disc and Music Echo emphasizing the originality of the duo's sound and its "simplicity, fun and beauty", with Disc and Music Echo noting "the strength of the album lies in its love, beauty, fantasy and nature. And then Marc says that, for him, the album is months out of date! Which should bode well for the future". Record Mirror stated the lyrics were worth listening to, rightly predicting it would be a big seller.

Retrospective reviews have been favourable. AllMusic praised the album saying, it "approaches the listener from a totally unique angle. The Bolan voice [...] blends so perfectly with the bizarre, almost Eastern-sounding instrumentation". Reviewer Dave Thompson called it "an irresistible affair, if absolutely a child of its psychedelically-inclined time" adding, "It's hard not to be drawn to the actual dynamics of My People Were Fair, the uncanny way Tyrannosaurus Rex take the slightest musical instruments, pixie phones, glockenspiels and a Chinese gong included, to make them sound like the heaviest rock & roll band on the planet". In a five out of five star review, Paul Stewart of Sunday Express wrote that it was "varied and vibrant. The textures grab your attention but not in a hard rock, slap you round the face kind of way. This is chill out music from a time before people called it chilling out".

== Track listing ==
All tracks are written by Marc Bolan.

Side A
| No. | Title | Length |
|---|---|---|
| 1. | "Hot Rod Mama" | 3:09 |
| 2. | "Scenescof" | 1:41 |
| 3. | "Child Star" | 2:52 |
| 4. | "Strange Orchestras" | 1:47 |
| 5. | "Chateau in Virginia Waters" | 2:38 |
| 6. | "Dwarfish Trumpet Blues" | 2:47 |

Side B
| No. | Title | Length |
|---|---|---|
| 1. | "Mustang Ford" | 2:56 |
| 2. | "Afghan Woman" | 1:59 |
| 3. | "Knight" | 2:38 |
| 4. | "Graceful Fat Sheba" | 1:28 |
| 5. | "Weilder of Words" | 3:19 |
| 6. | "Frowning Atahuallpa (My Inca Love)" | 5:55 |

2004 Expanded Edition
| No. | Title | Length |
|---|---|---|
| 1. | "Hot Rod Mama" (Mono Mix) | 3:11 |
| 2. | "Scenescof" (Mono Mix) | 1:04 |
| 3. | "Child Star" (Mono Mix) | 2:51 |
| 4. | "Strange Orchestras" (Mono Mix) | 1:48 |
| 5. | "Chateau in Virginia Waters" (Mono Mix) | 2:40 |
| 6. | "Dwarfish Trumpet Blues" (Mono Mix) | 2:46 |
| 7. | "Mustang Ford" (Mono Mix) | 3:01 |
| 8. | "Afghan Woman" (Mono Mix) | 3:01 |
| 9. | "Knight" (Mono Mix) | 2:41 |
| 10. | "Graceful Fat Sheba" (Mono Mix) | 1:29 |
| 11. | "Weilder of Words" (Mono Mix) | 3:19 |
| 12. | "Frowning Atahualpa (My Inca Love)" (Mono Mix) | 5:55 |
| 13. | "Debora" (single track) | 3:07 |
| 14. | "Hot Rod Mama" (Stereo Mix) | 3:10 |
| 15. | "Scenescof" (Stereo Mix) | 1:39 |
| 16. | "Child Star" (Stereo Mix) | 2:19 |
| 17. | "Strange Orchestras" (Stereo Mix) | 1:45 |
| 18. | "Chateau in Virginia Waters" (Stereo Mix) | 2:37 |
| 19. | "Dwarfish Trumpet Blues" (Stereo Mix) | 2:46 |
| 20. | "Mustang Ford" (Stereo Mix) | 2:57 |
| 21. | "Afghan Woman" (Stereo Mix) | 1:56 |
| 22. | "Knight" (Stereo Mix) | 2:36 |
| 23. | "Graceful Fat Sheba" (Stereo Mix) | 1:27 |
| 24. | "Weilder of Words" (Stereo Mix) | 3:18 |
| 25. | "Frowning Atahualpa (My Inca Love)" (Stereo Mix) | 5:54 |
| 26. | "Child Star" (Take 2) | 2:40 |
| 27. | "Chateau in Virginia Waters" (Take 2) | 2:54 |
| 28. | "Debora" (Take 2) | 3:09 |

Note: There is a short, unlisted title track at the end of side B.

== Personnel ==
Personnel taken from the album's liner notes.

Tyrannosaurus Rex

- Marc Bolan – vocals, guitar
- Steve Peregrin Took – vocals, bongos, Chinese gong, assorted percussion, Pixiphone

Additional performer

- John Peel – spoken word, liner notes

Technical personnel

- Tony Visconti – producer
- Gerald Chevin – engineer
- George Underwood – front cover
