= King of the Rumbling Spires =

Single by Tyrannosaurus Rex
- B-side: "Do You Remember"
- Released: July 1969
- Genre: Psychedelic rock
- Length: 2:07
- Label: Regal Zonophone
- Songwriter(s): Marc Bolan
- Producer(s): Tony Visconti

Tyrannosaurus Rex singles chronology
| "Pewter Suitor" (1969) | "King of the Rumbling Spires" (1969) | "By the Light of a Magical Moon" (1970) |

"King of the Rumbling Spires" is a single by Tyrannosaurus Rex, released in July 1969. It featured the duo of Marc Bolan and Steve Peregrin Took and was written by Bolan. It was a minor chart hit, the first by the group to contain electric guitar instead of acoustic, and was Took's last appearance with the duo on record.

== Background ==
The track was significantly different from the earlier folk rock material and featured multiple electric guitars from Bolan (played on a Fender Stratocaster) and a toy drum kit from Took. Producer Tony Visconti played bass guitar and electric organ on the track. Bolan had become influenced by the emerging late 1960s rock scene featuring bands such as Led Zeppelin, Jethro Tull and Humble Pie, and wanted to record some experimental guitar work in the style he had used in his earlier stint with John's Children. However, the switch to harsh electric guitar was atypical of the duo's acoustic-based sound, and would not be a regular feature for a few years.

A review in Melody Maker called it "Bolan's most commercial production to date" and called the song "electrified teenybopper". Several reviews hoped it would be a significant hit, and move Tyrannosaurus Rex away from their cult underground image. In the event, it had a single week's appearance on the charts, at number 44, and was the last hit before Bolan regrouped the band as T. Rex to wider commercial success. It was also the last single to feature Took, who Bolan fired shortly afterwards for wanting to record his own songs as well as Bolan's, as well as creative and lifestyle differences between the pair.

Originally issued as a stand-alone single, it was later included as a bonus track on reissues of the earlier album Unicorn.

== Personnel ==
- Marc Bolan - vocals, electric guitars
- Steve Peregrine Took - drum kit, percussion
- Tony Visconti - bass guitar, electric organ
