= Trident Studios =

British music recording studio

Coordinates: 51.5144°N 0.1342°W

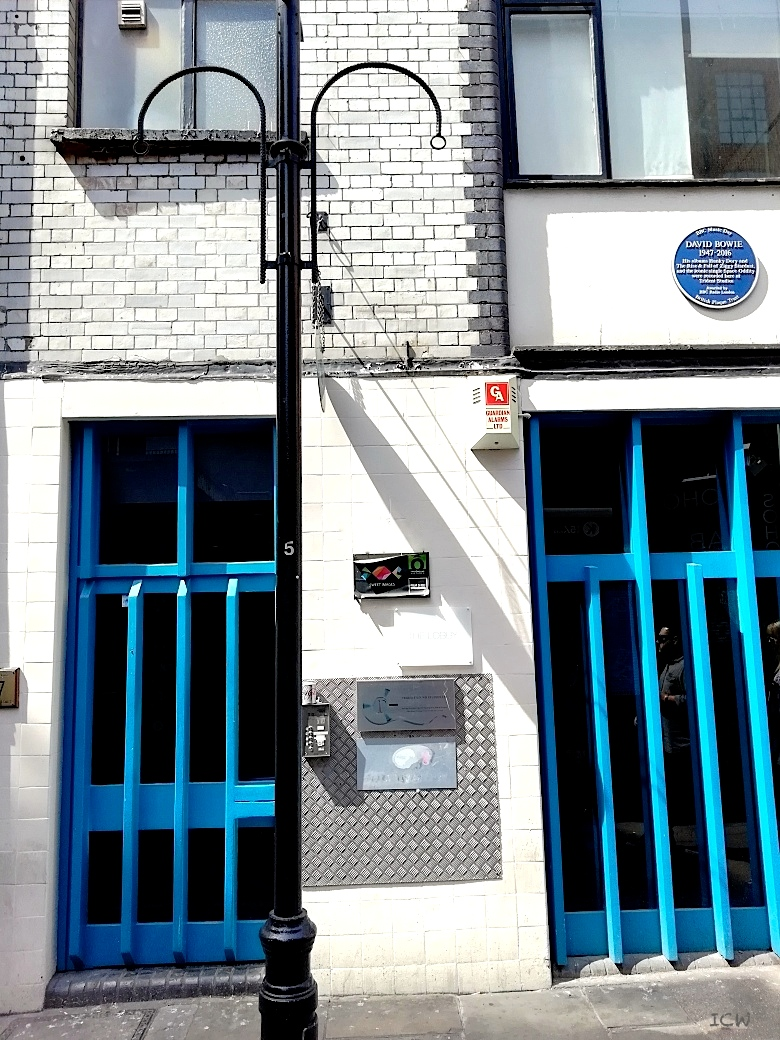
The former Trident Studios building at St Anne's Court, Soho, London, 2018, with the David Bowie blue plaque

Trident Studios logo

Trident Studios interior, c. 1975

Trident Studios was a British recording facility, located at 17 St Anne's Court in London's Soho district between 1968 and 1981. It was constructed in 1967 by Norman Sheffield, drummer of the 1960s group the Hunters, and his brother Barry Sheffield.

"My Name is Jack" by Manfred Mann was recorded at Trident in March 1968, and helped launch the studio's reputation. Later that year, the Beatles recorded their song "Hey Jude" there and part of their self-titled double album (also known as the "White Album"). Other well-known albums and songs recorded at Trident include Elton John's eponymous second album, including the single "Your Song", David Bowie's The Rise and Fall of Ziggy Stardust and the Spiders from Mars, Lou Reed's Transformer, Carly Simon's No Secrets, and Queen's albums Queen, Queen II, Sheer Heart Attack and A Night at the Opera.

Other artists recorded at Trident included the Bee Gees, Chris de Burgh, Frank Zappa, Genesis, Badfinger, Brand X, James Taylor, Joan Armatrading, Joe Cocker, Golden Earring, Harry Nilsson, Kiss, Indian Summer, Tygers of Pan Tang, Peter Gabriel, the Iveys, Marc Almond, Marc and the Mambas, Smack, Soft Cell, Rick Springfield, Rush, Free, Thin Lizzy, Tina Turner, T. Rex, Van der Graaf Generator, Yes, Black Sabbath and John Entwistle.

The Sheffield brothers had a relaxed working attitude, but also emphasised high standards of audio engineering. The studio's state-of-the-art recording equipment helped attract many major artists to record there.

The original recording facility ceased operations in 1981 and is now used as office space.

== The Beatles and Apple Records ==
In mid-1968, Trident Studios was the first in the UK to use Dolby noise reduction, and employ an eight-track reel-to-reel recording deck.

While Abbey Road Studios still used only four-track at the time, Trident's Ampex eight-track machine drew the Beatles on 31 July 1968 to record their song "Hey Jude". Paul McCartney later said about recording the track at Trident: "Words cannot describe the pleasure of listening back to the final mix of 'Hey Jude' on four giant Lockwood / Tannoy speakers which dwarfed everything else in the room ..." The band also recorded some songs for their 1968 double album The Beatles (also known as the White Album) at Trident – "Dear Prudence", "Honey Pie", "Savoy Truffle" and "Martha My Dear" – and on February 22, 1969, they first recorded "I Want You (She's So Heavy)" there for the album Abbey Road. John Lennon and Yoko Ono later returned with the Plastic Ono Band to record "Cold Turkey" featuring Eric Clapton on lead guitar.

Many of the Beatles' Apple Records artists used Trident Studios, including Badfinger, Billy Preston, Mary Hopkin, Jackie Lomax and James Taylor. Part of George Harrison's triple album All Things Must Pass, containing the hit "My Sweet Lord", and Ringo Starr's "It Don't Come Easy", were also recorded there. Harry Nilsson recorded "Without You" at Trident, and portions of several of his 1970s albums.

== Queen ==
The history of the Sheffield brothers and Trident Studios is also linked to the early discovery and success of the rock band Smile, later known as Queen. In 1972, Trident Studios started two record production companies, one of which (Neptune Productions) initially signed three artists, Mark Ashton, Eugene Wallace and Queen. The agreements with the artists were for recording and publishing, but Queen had no management, so they insisted that Trident also take on that responsibility. Trident, initially reluctant, eventually agreed and Queen signed an agreement with Trident Recording, Publishing and Management, on 1 November 1972.

The management at the time claimed the deal allowed the band full access to the studio's cutting edge facilities, and supported them by providing the best producers and engineers - so long as the foundations of the band's first album Queen were recorded 'off peak'. Roger Taylor later quoted these early off-peak studio hours as "gold dust".

After the album was completed the Sheffield brothers had great difficulty finding a record label to take on the album and release it. Finally, eight months later, the brothers decided to take on the risk and fund the release themselves and Queen released their self-titled first album under the Trident label in a license deal with EMI Records in the UK and Elektra Records in the US. Trident subsequently released Queen II and Sheer Heart Attack under this same arrangement. After the band left Trident, they signed directly with EMI and Elektra for A Night at the Opera .

== David Bowie, Elton John and others ==
In March 1968, Manfred Mann recorded Trident's first number one at the studio, the single "My Name Is Jack". From 1968 to 1981, some of the most reputed artists used the studios for their recordings, including David Bowie, Elton John, Marc Bolan/T.Rex, Carly Simon, Frank Zappa, Free, Genesis, Lou Reed, Joan Armatrading, Black Sabbath, Lindisfarne, Dusty Springfield, the Mahavishnu Orchestra, Krisma, Jeff Beck/Rod Stewart and other artists. Elton John's first US Top 40 record "Your Song" and Carly Simon's "You're So Vain" were both engineered at Trident by Robin Geoffrey Cable, who later went on to produce two albums for the Dickies.

Tony Stratton-Smith's Charisma Records was also one of the most regular clients of the studios during the 1970s. Genesis recorded several of their most renowned albums there, including Trespass (1970), Nursery Cryme (1971) and A Trick of the Tail (1976). The jazz fusion band Brand X recorded their debut studio album Unorthodox Behaviour here (1976). Other artists from the label who recorded at Trident were Van der Graaf Generator, Peter Hammill, Lindisfarne and Peter Gabriel. Charisma's first Van der Graaf Generator release, The Least We Can Do Is Wave to Each Other, was recorded at Trident from 11 to 14 December 1969. Most of the album was recorded on eight-track, but the last song, "After the Flood", was recorded on 16. Trident was also among the first studios in the UK to obtain a 16-track machine.

== The Trident 'A' Range console ==
Trident Studios interior circa 1975 from the Studio and the famous Bechstein Piano

The Trident A Range consoles were originally designed and built as an in house project by Malcolm Toft who was chief recording engineer at Trident and Barry Porter who was in charge of studio maintenance. Other studios heard about it and placed orders for consoles and Trident Audio Developments was formed with Malcolm Toft as managing director. Cherokee Studios in Los Angeles was one of the early recipients of one of the first production models, and ultimately purchased three new from Trident and one from a broker at a later time. David Bowie, Rod Stewart, and Frank Sinatra are among the early artists who first recorded hit records on Cherokee's first 'A' Range console.

According to Mix Magazine, in 2001: "Though it had a very limited run, the Trident A Range console gained a reputation for its very distinct and pleasant sound with a very "musical" EQ section. Along with channel strips from early Neve and Helios consoles, original Trident A Range modules have kept a healthy resale value and are much sought after by engineers who like to combine old-school analogue gear with cutting-edge digital recording technology."

== Studio piano ==
Trident also gained a reputation for the sound of its piano, which can be heard on the Beatles' "Hey Jude", Elton John's "Your Song", Carly Simon's "The Right Thing To Do", Queen's "Killer Queen" and many other tracks. It was a handmade C. Bechstein concert-sized instrument that was over one hundred years old. The piano was offered for auction in November 2001, but failed to sell.

== Lockwood Tannoy monitoring speakers ==
From 1968 until 1974, Trident used four large monitoring loudspeakers in the control room. These speakers were mentioned by Paul McCartney:

Words cannot describe the pleasure of listening back to the final mix of "Hey Jude" on four giant Lockwood / Tannoy speakers which dwarfed everything else in the room ...

— Paul McCartney,

The recording was done on Lockwood Tannoy speakers, and had to be equalized post-recording to fix the balance of high-end notes. The speaker drivers used were 15-inch dual-concentric Tannoy Golds, which had been newly developed, mounted in cabinets made by Lockwood, UK. They were black in colour and fabricated in Formica with a gold bezel. Two of the original loudspeakers still exist and more information can be found here at The Original Trident Studios monitoring Loudspeakers – A History

== Later history ==
Trident Studios was sold in December 1981. It was bought by its senior engineer, Stephen Short, along with three other investors while Peter Booth, who oversaw day-to-day studio operations. In 1986, Short bought out the other investors and opened Trident 2 which was opened in 1983 and the investors were J.P. Illiesco and Rusty Egan. There were also another group of producers and investors who tried to buy Trident in the 1980s after its initial closure, headed by Neville Kernick-Nixon, Flood and John Keating; the former then opened The Mad House, later known as The Music Station.

The original Trident mixing desk also survived, and was purchased in the early 1980s from the studio's owners by songwriter and former Cure bassist Phil Thornalley. It is now housed in Thornalley's own recording studio, Swamp Studios in north-west London. The Swamp is actually centred on the Trident Tri‑mix desk.

Since 1981, the studios have changed name(s) and hands multiple times, with the original building remaining in situ.

Between 1997–1998, the site was the headquarters of Rob Playford's influential drum and bass label, Moving Shadow. It was here that Goldie produced his second album Saturnz Return. Notably, David Bowie visited the site to record vocals for Goldie's song "Truth."

== Blue plaque ==
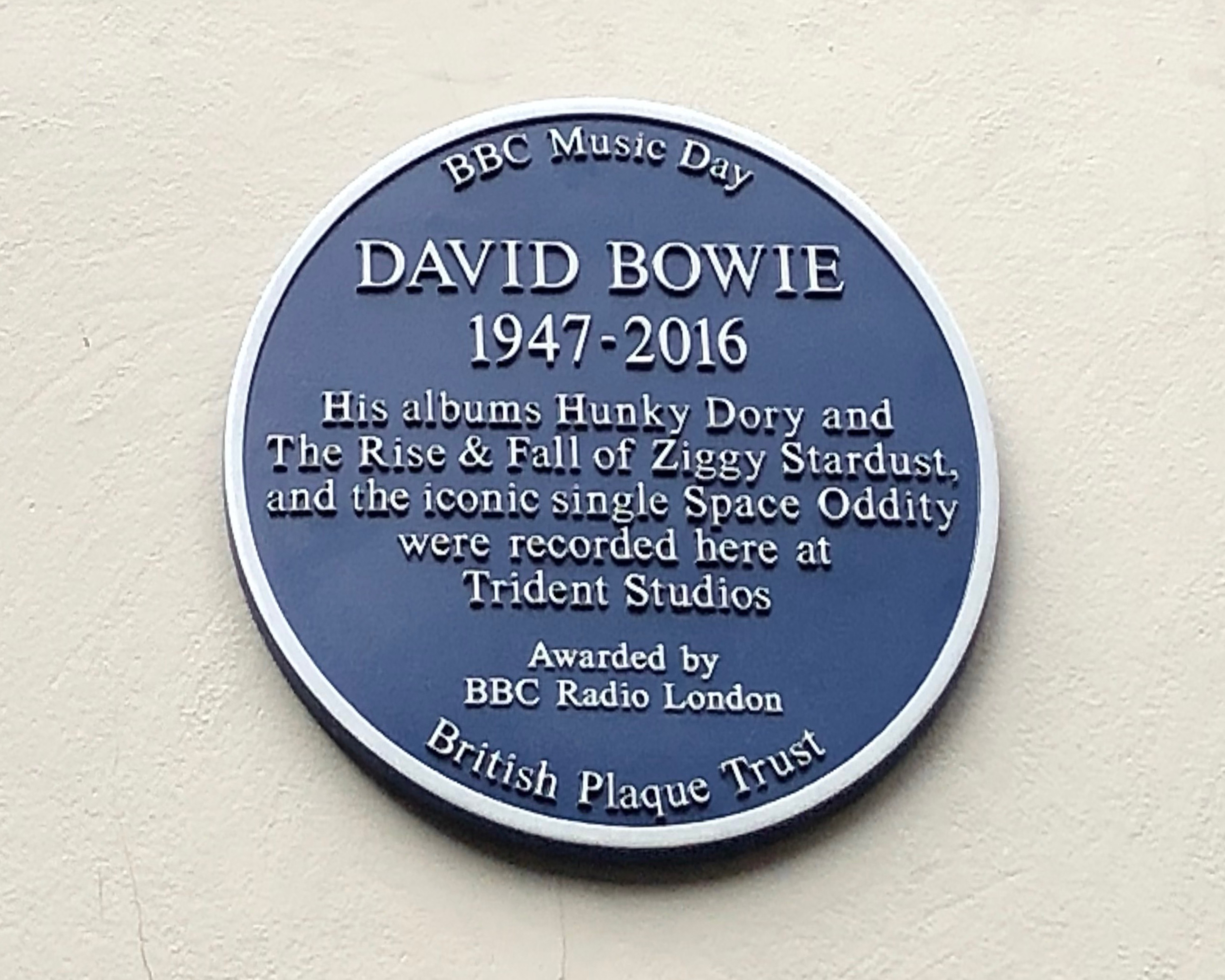
David Bowie plaque, Trident Studios, London

On 15 June 2017, a British Plaque Trust permanent blue plaque was unveiled outside the building at 17 St Anne's Court, London in the recognition of the multiple David Bowie albums recorded there.

== Partial discography ==
The following is a partial list of work either recorded, mixed or mastered at Trident Studios between 1968 and 1981, edited from the timeline on the Trident Studios official website. A further list of albums is available at Albums recorded at Trident Studios.

Artist	Title
Ace	How Long (1974)
America	America (1971)
Joan Armatrading	Whatever's for Us (1972)
The Beatles	"Hey Jude", "Dear Prudence", "Honey Pie", "Martha My Dear", "Savoy Truffle" (1968), "I Want You (She's So Heavy)" (1969)
Bee Gees	Odessa (1969)
Marc Bolan / Tyrannosaurus Rex / T-Rex	Prophets, Seers & Sages: The Angels of the Ages (1968), Unicorn (1969), A Beard of Stars (1970), T. Rex (1970), Electric Warrior (1971)
The Boomtown Rats	"I Don't Like Mondays" (1979)
David Bowie	Space Oddity (1969), The Man Who Sold the World (1970), Hunky Dory (1971), The Rise and Fall of Ziggy Stardust (1972), Aladdin Sane (1973)
Chris de Burgh	Far Beyond These Castle Walls (1974)
Billy Cobham	Spectrum (1973)
Cass Elliot	The Road Is No Place for a Lady (1972)
Free	Fire and Water (1970)
Peter Gabriel	Peter Gabriel (1978 album, often referred to as Scratch)
Genesis	Trespass (1970), Nursery Cryme (1971), Selling England by the Pound (1973), A Trick of the Tail (1976), Wind & Wuthering (1976), Seconds Out (1977), ...And Then There Were Three... (1978)
Golden Earring	Moontan (1973)
Elton John	Elton John (1970), Tumbleweed Connection (1970), 17-11-70, Madman Across the Water (1971), Honky Château (1972), Don't Shoot Me I'm Only the Piano Player (1973), Goodbye Yellow Brick Road (1973), Rock of the Westies (1975)
Judas Priest	Stained Class (1978)
Manfred Mann	"My Name is Jack" (1968)
Mott the Hoople	All the Young Dudes (1973)
Queen	Queen (1973), Queen II (1974), Sheer Heart Attack (1974)
Lou Reed	Transformer (1972)
The Rolling Stones	"Midnight Rambler" (1969), Let It Bleed (1969)
Rush	Hemispheres (1978), Permanent Waves (1980)
Carly Simon	No Secrets (1972)
Supertramp	Crime of the Century (1974)
James Taylor	James Taylor (1968)
Thin Lizzy	Nightlife (1974)
Tygers of Pan Tang	Crazy Nights (1981)
