= Pixiphone =

Toy glockenspiel

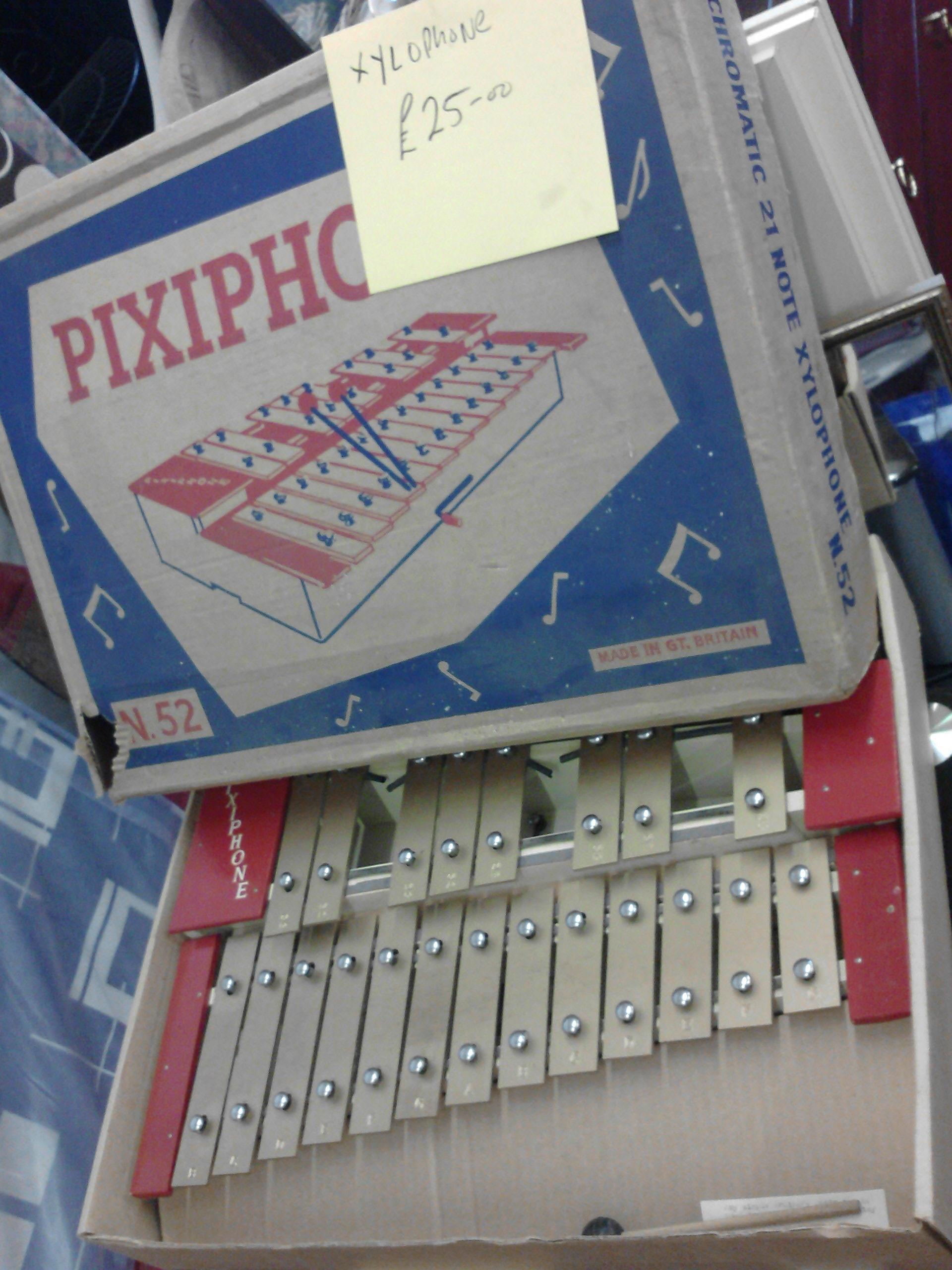

Percussion instrument
- Hornbostel–Sachs classification: 111.212 (Sets of percussion sticks)
- Developed: 1950s

Builders
- Chas E. Methven Ltd

The Pixiphone was a range of toy glockenspiels (although they were inaccurately labelled as xylophones on their packaging). The larger Pixiphones had a 'raiser-bar' which could be used to end a note abruptly, rather than letting the sound fade naturally. Although marketed as a children's toy, the Pixiphone could be tuned pitch-perfect and was very robust, resulting in many children using them at British schools for music instruction, and occasional use on professional recordings by established musicians (see "recordings" below).

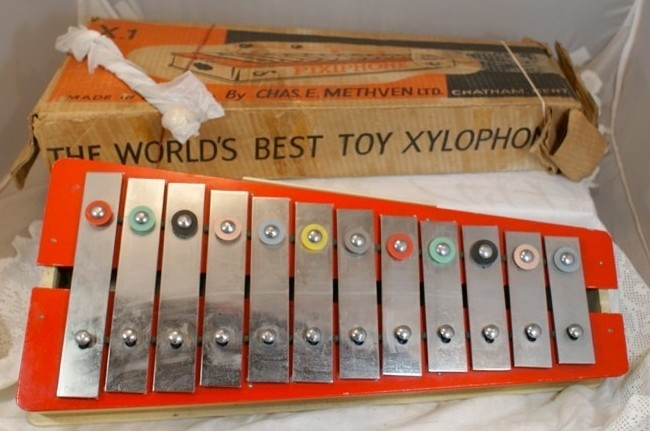
Diatonic Pixiphone

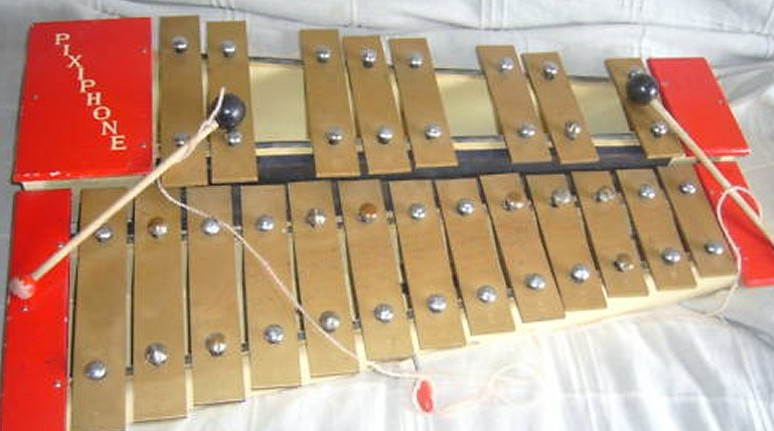
Chromatic Pixiphone

== Manufacturer ==
The Pixiphone was manufactured by Chas E. Methven Ltd, Chatham, Kent, England, and distributed by Playcraft Toys Ltd England from the 1950s to the 1970s (or possibly later).

== Recordings ==
The Pixiphone, incorrectly (or jokingly) credited as a Pixiephone, was played by Steve Took on three Tyrannosaurus Rex albums, and on David Bowie's The World of David Bowie.

The Pixiphone was used on the self titled album by the Canterbury scene band Hatfield and the North on track 5 by Jeremy Baines

The instrument was also used on the Badfinger song "She Came Out of the Cold" which featured on the compilation album Without You, by Jeremy Baines on the first Henry Cow album, and by Daisy Chute on the single "Lazy Daze". Ben Christophers also used one on two Marianne Faithfull songs, "Late Victorian Holocaust" and "Deep Water" on her Give My Love to London album, although again it is misspelled pixiephone in the booklet.

Britpop/Shoegazer band LUSH used a Pixiphone in the introduction to "Light from a Dead Star from the 1994 Album Split.

== Similar instruments ==
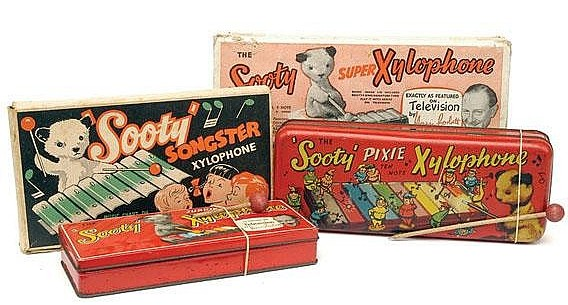
Sooty Xylophones sold in the 1950s and 1960s

A similar but unrelated instrument was sold as the Sooty Pixie Xylophone (Pixie with an e) in the same period.
