= Peter Sanders (photographer) =

British photographer

- Born: 1946 (age 79–80); London, England
- Occupation: Photographer
- Notable work: Meetings with Mountains, The Exemplars, In the Shade of the Tree, The Art of Integration
- Website: https://petersanders.com/

Peter Sanders is a British photographer. His works focus on the Muslim community around the world, especially their traditional and spiritual aspects.

== Biography ==
Born in London, Sanders began his career in photography in the mid-1960s, where he often recorded the faces of well-known musicians including Bob Dylan, Jimi Hendrix, Jim Morrison and The Rolling Stones. In the 1970s, his attention shifted, which led him to the traditional and spiritual universe of Islam. He converted to Islam in 1971. The same year, Sanders was given a unique opportunity to record the warmth of the world's largest worship gathering in Mecca during the Hajj season. These pictures have appeared in major UK and European magazines such as The Sunday Times, The Observer and Paris Match. Sanders travelled around the world to meet and capture the images of saints and sages of Islam which he has later published in a book titled 'Meetings with Mountains'.

== Works ==
- Exemplars for Our Time by Michael Sugich and Peter Sanders (Inspiral Books, 2022)
- Meetings with Mountains: Encounters with the Saints and Sages of the Islamic World (Inspiral Books, 2019)
- In the Shade of the Tree: A Photographic Journey Through the Muslim World (Inspiral Books, 2007)
- The Art of Integration: Islam in Our Green and Pleasant Land (Awakening Publications, 2008)
