= Fly Records =

British independent record label

- Founded: 1970
- Founder: David Platz
- Genre: Rock; Pop
- Country of origin: United Kingdom
- Official website: http://www.flyrecords.co.uk

Fly Records is a British independent record label, established in 1970 by the independent music publisher David Platz, and initially managed by Malcolm Jones from the offices of Essex Music in London.

== History ==
Platz had been producing records independently, in conjunction with record producers funded by Essex, and leasing them to major record labels. These creative collaborations quickly made their mark with hits such as "A Whiter Shade of Pale" (Procol Harum), "Flowers in the Rain", "I Can Hear the Grass Grow" and "Blackberry Way" (The Move) alongside influential recordings from the likes of Beverley Kutner, Tucker Zimmerman and Michael Chapman.

The producer roster involved with Platz included Denny Cordell, Gus Dudgeon, Rodger Bain, Don Paul, Johnny Worth and Tony Visconti, whom Platz had brought over to the United Kingdom at Cordell's initiation.

After a string of hits in the late 1960s licensed via labels Deram and, later, Regal Zonophone, Platz launched his own label Fly Records in 1970. Malcolm Jones had left university to work for EMI, becoming a label manager and creating his own imprint at EMI, Harvest Records, but moved to work for Platz as manager of Fly.

Fly's first release was "Ride a White Swan" by T. Rex, produced by Visconti. The following year the album Electric Warrior was both Fly's and Bolan's first No. 1 on the UK Albums Chart.

In keeping with Platz's publishing style, the label chose not to concentrate on a particular sector of the market but preferred to offer an eclectic mix of artists and releases, some aimed directly at the chart and some intended simply to enhance the profiles of new artists or artists who were linked to the Platz's publishing enterprise. Vivian Stanshall, Third World War, John Kongos, Georgia Brown, John Keating, and John Williams were all featured on the label's early releases.

In 1972, Fly consolidated their chart success with older material. Four three-track Magni-Fly singles were released which reintroduced songs from the company's back catalogue, such as "A Whiter Shade of Pale", into the UK Singles Chart. An album campaign entitled 'Toofas', (double albums priced as a single), found favour, and albums such as Procol Harum's debut set suddenly made the UK Albums Chart years after their initial release.

Once T. Rex's album Bolan Boogie reached No. 1 in the UK Albums Chart, departures at Fly HQ forced a change of plan. Jones left the label, Cordell moved to the United States forming Shelter Records, and Bolan moved to EMI, where he was given his own imprint, taking Visconti with him. The new Fly team chose to relaunch the label as Cube Records, with a new logo caging the 'Fly' in a cubic jail. A raft of new artists were signed, and Fly Records was shelved as a label in its own right.

By the time the Fly label was revived in 1988 as an independent outlet for various publishing related projects, Platz had incorporated the Fly label into his company Onward Music Ltd., whilst Platz's publishing company Bucks Music Ltd. remained his core business. The revived label's first signing in 1988 was Babayaga a band fronted by Kirsty MacColl's brother Hamish and recording engineer Matt Wallis.

Following David Platz's death on 20 May 1994, his son Simon Platz continued managing Onward's ongoing archive exploration under the wing of his own publishing company, Bucks Music Group. A host of original tapes thought lost, as well as unreleased and forgotten recordings from unfinished or unreleased projects from the production company, continues to fuel releases through Fly Records and various licensees.

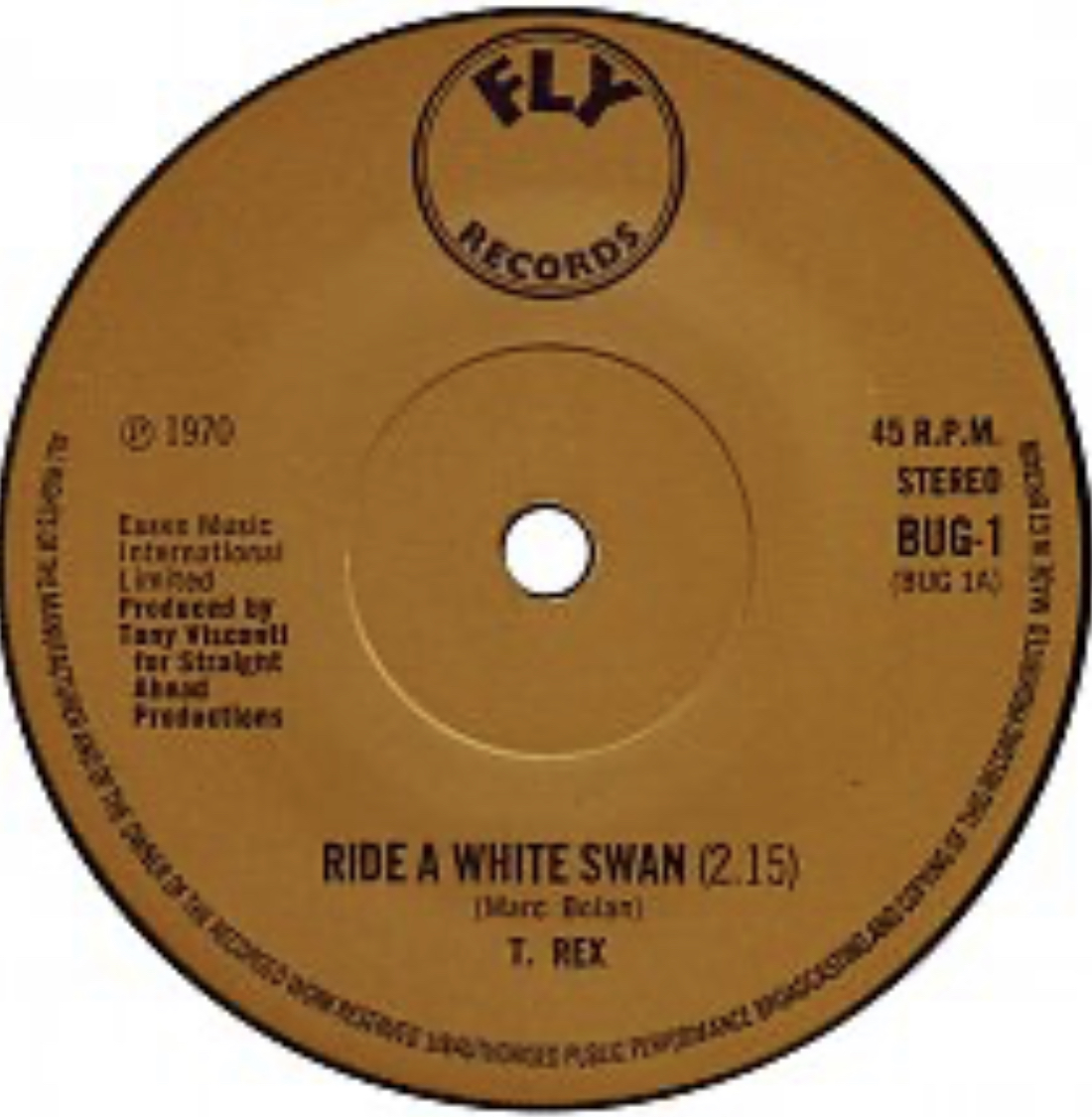
Ride a White Swan Fly Records
