= Meanings of minor-planet names: 18001–19000 =

As minor planet discoveries are confirmed, they are given a permanent number by the IAU's Minor Planet Center (MPC), and the discoverers can then submit names for them, following the IAU's naming conventions. The list below concerns those minor planets in the specified number-range that have received names, and explains the meanings of those names.

Official naming citations of newly named small Solar System bodies are approved and published in a bulletin by IAU's Working Group for Small Bodies Nomenclature (WGSBN). Before May 2021, citations were published in MPC's Minor Planet Circulars for many decades. Recent citations can also be found on the JPL Small-Body Database (SBDB). Until his death in 2016, German astronomer Lutz D. Schmadel compiled these citations into the Dictionary of Minor Planet Names (DMP) and regularly updated the collection.

Based on Paul Herget's The Names of the Minor Planets, Schmadel also researched the unclear origin of numerous asteroids, most of which had been named prior to World War II. This article incorporates text from this source, which is in the public domain: SBDB New namings may only be added to this list below after official publication as the preannouncement of names is condemned. The WGSBN publishes a comprehensive guideline for the naming rules of non-cometary small Solar System bodies.

== 18001–18100 ==
Named minor planet	Provisional	This minor planet was named for...	Ref · Catalog
18001 Lijing	1999 JY_{83}	Jing Li, Chinese-American solar astrophysicist and wife of astronomer David Jewitt, studied the solar dynamo.	IAU · 18001
18004 Krystosek	1999 JD_{86}	Rebecca Jennifer Krystosek, ISEF awardee in 2003	MPC · 18004
18009 Patrickgeer	1999 JP_{100}	Patrick L. Geer, ISEF awardee in 2003	MPC · 18009
18012 Marsland	1999 JM_{114}	Kyle Anthony Marsland, ISEF awardee in 2003	MPC · 18012
18013 Shedletsky	1999 JS_{114}	Anna-Katrina Shedletsky, ISEF awardee in 2003	MPC · 18013
18015 Semenkovich	1999 JD_{121}	Nicholas Paul Semenkovich, ISEF awardee in 2003	MPC · 18015
18016 Grondahl	1999 JU_{122}	Brian Jacob Grondahl, ISEF awardee in 2003	MPC · 18016
18019 Dascoli	1999 JJ_{126}	Jennifer Anne D'Ascoli, 2004 ISTS finalist and ISEF awardee in 2003	MPC · 18019
18020 Amend	1999 JT_{126}	Gregory Amend, ISEF awardee in 2003	MPC · 18020
18021 Waldman	1999 JH_{127}	Sarah Elyse Waldman, ISEF awardee in 2003	MPC · 18021
18022 Pepper	1999 JN_{127}	Brian Jeffrey Pepper, ISEF awardee in 2003	MPC · 18022
18024 Dobson	1999 KK_{4}	John Dobson (1915–2014), an American telescope maker and amateur astronomer	MPC · 18024
18026 Juliabaldwin	1999 KG_{13}	Julia Ruby Baldwin, ISEF awardee in 2003	MPC · 18026
18027 Gokcay	1999 KL_{14}	Chelsea Bahar Gokcay, ISEF awardee in 2003	MPC · 18027
18028 Ramchandani	1999 KO_{14}	Joia Ramchandani, ISEF awardee in 2003	MPC · 18028
18032 Geiss	1999 MG_{1}	Johannes Geiss (born 1926), a German-born space scientist at the Swiss University of Bern †	JPL · 18032
18043 Laszkowska	1999 RQ_{54}	Monika Laszkowska, ISEF awardee in 2003	MPC · 18043
18055 Fernhildebrandt	1999 TJ_{13}	Fern C. Hildebrandt (born 1927) instilled and cultivated an interest in astronomy in codiscoverer Gary Hug at a very early age. Resident now in Topeka, Kansas, she has been an example of dedication and triumph through difficult times and has inspired this codiscoverer to search the night sky.	JPL · 18055
18059 Cavalieri	1999 XL_{137}	Bonaventura Cavalieri (1598–1647), a friar and a professor at the University of Bologna.	JPL · 18059
18060 Zarex	1999 XJ_{156}	Zarex, from Greek mythology. He was a grandson of Chiron, married Rhoeo after she arrived on Delos and became the step-father of Anius.	IAU · 18060
18075 Donasharma	2000 DD_{5}	Dona Sarah Sharma, ISEF awardee in 2003	MPC · 18075
18077 Dianeingrao	2000 EM_{148}	Diane L. Ingrao (born 1951), an American secretary of the Warren Astronomical Society in Detroit, Michigan	JPL · 18077
18079 Lion-Stoppato	2000 FJ_{63}	Piero Francesco Lion-Stoppato (born 1969), an Italian space scientist at University of Padua	JPL · 18079
18084 Adamwohl	2000 HP_{47}	Adam Richard Wohl, ISEF awardee in 2003	MPC · 18084
18086 Emilykraft	2000 JQ_{21}	Emily Michele Kraft, ISEF awardee in 2003	MPC · 18086
18087 Yamanaka	2000 JA_{22}	Yvonne Joy Yamanaka, ISEF awardee in 2003	MPC · 18087
18088 Roberteunice	2000 JS_{30}	Robert Earl Eunice, ISEF awardee in 2003	MPC · 18088
18090 Kevinkuo	2000 JA_{56}	Kevin Chester Kuo, ISEF awardee in 2003	MPC · 18090
18091 Iranmanesh	2000 JN_{58}	Arya Mohammad Iranmanesh, ISEF awardee in 2003	MPC · 18091
18092 Reinhold	2000 KR_{29}	Kimberly Elise Reinhold, ISEF awardee in 2003	MPC · 18092
18095 Frankblock	2000 LL_{5}	Frank Emmanuel Block, ISEF awardee in 2003	MPC · 18095
18099 Flamini	2000 LD_{27}	Enrico Flamini (born 1951), an Italian astronomer	JPL · 18099
18100 Lebreton	2000 LE_{28}	Jean-Pierre Lebreton (born 1949), French astronomer	JPL · 18100

== 18101–18200 ==
back to top

Named minor planet	Provisional	This minor planet was named for...	Ref · Catalog
18101 Coustenis	2000 LF_{32}	Athéna Coustenis, French astronomer	JPL · 18101
18102 Angrilli	2000 LN_{34}	Francesco Angrilli, Italian space scientist	JPL · 18102
18104 Mahalingam	2000 NP_{3}	Satish Mahalingam, ISEF awardee in 2003	MPC · 18104
18106 Blume	2000 NX_{3}	William H. Blume, American senior space mission designer	JPL · 18106
18110 HASI	2000 NK_{13}	The 44 members of the Huygens Atmospheric Structure Instrument (HASI) team	JPL · 18110
18111 Pinet	2000 NB_{14}	Patrick Pinet, French astronomer	JPL · 18111
18112 Jeanlucjosset	2000 NX_{17}	Jean-Luc Josset, Swiss astronomer, director of the Space Exploration Institute in Neuchâtel, Switzerland	JPL · 18112
18113 Bibring	2000 NC_{19}	Jean-Pierre Bibring, French astronomer and planetary scientist	JPL · 18113
18114 Rosenbush	2000 NN_{19}	Vera K. Rosenbush, Ukrainian astronomer	JPL · 18114
18115 Rathbun	2000 NT_{19}	Donald Rathbun, American neurologist	JPL · 18115
18116 Prato	2000 NY_{22}	Prato province, Tuscany, Italy, where the Museo di Scienze Planetarie (Museum of Planetary Sciences) is located	JPL · 18116
18117 Jonhodge	2000 NY_{23}	Jonathon Hodge (born 1948), American teacher and astronomy communicator	JPL · 18117
18119 Braude	2000 NZ_{24}	Semen Ya. Braude, Russian radioastronomer	JPL · 18119
18120 Lytvynenko	2000 NA_{25}	Leonid Mikolajovich Lytvynenko (Leonid Nikolaevich Lytvynenko), Ukrainian radioastronomer	JPL · 18120
18121 Konovalenko	2000 NF_{25}	Alexandr A. Konovalenko, Ukrainian radioastronomer	JPL · 18121
18122 Forestamartin	2000 NL_{27}	Franco Foresta Martin, Italian science popularizer, scientific editor for the newspaper Corriere della Sera	JPL · 18122
18123 Pavan	2000 NS_{27}	Luciano Pavan, Italian musician, writer, painter and amateur astronomer	JPL · 18123
18124 Leeperry	2000 NE_{28}	Lee Taylor Perry, ISEF awardee in 2003	MPC · 18124
18125 Brianwilson	2000 OF	Californian songwriter and record producer Brian Wilson (born 1942) contributed to 1960s pop culture, with songs like Fun Fun Fun, exemplifying the pastimes of modern teenage life, through the Beach Boys' pop group harmonies, giving out very good vibrations indeed.	JPL · 18125
18127 Denversmith	2000 OX_{3}	Denver L. Smith, ISEF awardee in 2003	MPC · 18127
18128 Wysner	2000 OD_{5}	Laura C. Wysner, ISEF awardee in 2003	MPC · 18128
18132 Spector	2000 ON_{9}	Phil Spector, American record producer and songwriter †	MPC · 18132
18142 Adamsidman	2000 OG_{47}	Adam Daniel Sidman, ISEF awardee in 2003	MPC · 18142
18148 Bellier	2000 OZ_{57}	Guy and Caroline Bellier, French orthopedic surgeons, and their sons Thomas and Margaux	JPL · 18148
18149 Colombatti	2000 OB_{58}	Giacomo Colombatti, Italian planetologist	JPL · 18149
18150 Lopez-Moreno	2000 OC_{60}	José J. Lopez-Moreno, Spanish planetologist	JPL · 18150
18151 Licchelli	2000 OT_{60}	Domenico Licchelli, Italian astronomer and popularizer	JPL · 18151
18152 Heidimanning	2000 OW_{60}	Heidi L. K. Manning, American planetary scientist	JPL · 18152
18155 Jasonschuler	2000 PF_{2}	Jason Michael Schuler, ISEF awardee in 2003	MPC · 18155
18156 Kamisaibara	2000 PU_{4}	Kamisaibara, the village in Okayama prefecture.	JPL · 18156
18157 Craigwright	2000 PH_{10}	Craig John Wright, ISEF awardee in 2003	MPC · 18157
18158 Nigelreuel	2000 PM_{10}	Nigel Forest Reuel, ISEF awardee in 2003	MPC · 18158
18159 Andrewcook	2000 PW_{10}	Andrew Gordon Cook, ISEF awardee in 2003	MPC · 18159
18160 Nihon Uchu Forum	2000 PY_{12}	Nihon Uchu Forum, Japanese editor of the Japan Aerospace Exploration Agency (JAXA) annual NASDA Note.	JPL · 18160
18161 Koshiishi	2000 PZ_{12}	Hajime Koshiishi (born 1930) became interested in investigating minor planets as a natural resource. He organized a society for the study of NEAs and their resource utilization and made efforts toward the establishment of the Japan Spaceguard Association	JPL · 18161
18162 Denlea	2000 PX_{15}	Jeremy Micah Denlea, ISEF awardee in 2003	MPC · 18162
18163 Jennalewis	2000 PF_{16}	Jenna Lyanne Lewis, ISEF awardee in 2003, and IFAA recipient	MPC · 18163
18167 Buttani	2000 PS_{27}	Buttani Philippe (born 1966), a friend of one of the discoverers, started the "CCD adventure" with him in July 1994	JPL · 18167
18169 Amaldi	2000 QF	The nuclear physicist Edoardo Amaldi (1908–1989) was part of the team of Enrico Fermi and contributed to the completion of the first particle accelerator in Italy.	JPL · 18169
18170 Ramjeawan	2000 QW_{2}	Khaivchandra Ramjeawan, ISEF awardee in 2003	MPC · 18170
18171 Romaneskue	2000 QB_{5}	Roman Garrick Eskue, ISEF awardee in 2003	MPC · 18171
18174 Khachatryan	2000 QW_{14}	George Alexander Khachatryan, ISEF awardee in 2003	MPC · 18174
18175 Jenniferchoy	2000 QB_{15}	Jennifer Tze-Heng Choy, ISEF awardee in 2003	MPC · 18175
18176 Julianhong	2000 QG_{22}	Julian C. Hong, ISEF awardee in 2003	MPC · 18176
18177 Harunaga	2000 QK_{27}	Jill Shizuko Harunaga, ISEF awardee in 2003	MPC · 18177
18180 Irenesun	2000 QB_{30}	Irene Yuan Sun, ISEF awardee in 2003	MPC · 18180
18182 Wiener	2000 QC_{35}	Norbert Wiener (1894–1964) contributed to many areas of mathematics, including cybernetics, stochastic processes and quantum theory. He was the author of the book Cybernetics, or control and communication in the animal and machine (1948).	JPL · 18182
18184 Dianepark	2000 QR_{37}	Diane Hyemin Park, ISEF awardee in 2003	MPC · 18184
18189 Medeobaldia	2000 QN_{82}	Maria Elena De Obaldia, ISEF awardee in 2003	MPC · 18189
18190 Michaelpizer	2000 QY_{89}	Michael J. Pizer, ISEF awardee in 2003	MPC · 18190
18191 Rayhe	2000 QL_{90}	Ray Chengchuan He, ISEF awardee in 2003	MPC · 18191
18192 Craigwallace	2000 QP_{90}	Craig J. Wallace, ISEF awardee in 2003	MPC · 18192
18193 Hollilydrury	2000 QT_{93}	Hollilyne Drury, ISEF awardee in 2003	MPC · 18193
18196 Rowberry	2000 QY_{132}	Megan Rowberry, ISEF awardee in 2003	MPC · 18196
18197 Brandondotson	2055 P-L	Brandon Dotson, American planetary scientist.	IAU · 18197
18198 Benjaminbyron	2056 P-L	Benjamin Byron, American planetary scientist.	IAU · 18198
18199 Shackelford	2583 P-L	Autumn Shackelford, American postdoctoral researcher at the University of Central Florida.	IAU · 18199
18200 Flaviarommel	2714 P-L	Flavia Luane Rommel, Brazilian astronomer.	IAU · 18200

== 18201–18300 ==
back to top

Named minor planet	Provisional	This minor planet was named for...	Ref · Catalog
18201 Proudfoot	2733 P-L	Benjamin Proudfoot, American astronomer.	IAU · 18201
18202 Nichols-Fleming	2757 P-L	Fiona Nichols-Fleming, American planetary geophysicist.	IAU · 18202
18203 Schörghofer	2837 P-L	Norbert Schörghofer, Austrian-born planetary scientist.	IAU · 18203
18204 Emilycostello	3065 P-L	Emily Costello, American planetary scientist.	IAU · 18204
18205 Camarca	3090 P-L	Maria Camarca, American observational planetary scientist.	IAU · 18205
18228 Hyperenor	3163 T-1	Hyperenor, one of the sons of Panthoos and a great hero on the Trojan side.	JPL · 18228
18235 Lynden-Bell	1003 T-2	Donald Lynden-Bell, a professor at the University of Cambridge.	JPL · 18235
18236 Bernardburke	1059 T-2	Bernard Burke (born 1928), a professor of physics at the Massachusetts Institute of Technology.	JPL · 18236
18237 Kenfreeman	1182 T-2	Kenneth C. Freeman, a professor at the Australian National University.	JPL · 18237
18238 Frankshu	1241 T-2	Frank Shu (born 1943), a president of National Tsinghua University in Taiwan and former professor at the University of California, Berkeley	JPL · 18238
18239 Ekers	1251 T-2	Ronald Ekers, current president of the IAU and ex-director of the Australian Telescope National Facility and of the Very Large Array.	JPL · 18239
18240 Mould	1317 T-2	Jeremy Mould, Australian astronomer	JPL · 18240
18241 Genzel	1325 T-2	Reinhard Genzel (born 1952), German astronomer and 2020 Physics Nobel prize	JPL · 18241
18242 Peebles	2102 T-2	Princeton theoretical cosmologist Jim Peebles (born 1935) and 2019 Physics Nobel Prize, plays a central role in the understanding of the evolution and structure of the universe. His studies of the evolution of matter in the earliest moments of the universe were critical in the establishment of the Big Bang theory as a widely accepted hypothesis.	JPL · 18242
18243 Gunn	2272 T-2	James Edward Gunn, a professor at Princeton University.	JPL · 18243
18244 Anneila	3008 T-2	Anneila Sargent, American astronomer	JPL · 18244
18263 Anchialos	5167 T-2	The Greek heroes Anchialos and Menestheus were together on their chariot when they were killed by Hector.	JPL · 18263
18268 Dardanos	2140 T-3	Dardanos, a son of Zeus and a nymph, mythical ancestor of the Trojans.	JPL · 18268
18278 Dymas	4035 T-3	Dymas, a king of Phrygia and father of Priam's second wife Hekabe (in Latin, Hecuba).	JPL · 18278
18281 Tros	4317 T-3	Tros, a grandson of Dardanos. His country was named Troas after him, and its principal city was Troy.	JPL · 18281
18282 Ilos	4369 T-3	Ilos, the oldest son of Tros, and he built the citadel Ilion, also named Ilios. Ilos was the father of Laomedon and the grandfather of Priam.	JPL · 18282
18284 Tsereteli	1970 PU	Zurab Konstantinovich Tsereteli (b.1934), world-renowned Russian sculptor.	JPL · 18284
18285 Vladplatonov	1972 GJ	Vladimir Petrovich Platonov (born 1938), well-known journalist and documentary-film director, is the author of many books, articles and films about the creators of space-rocket technologies and the many challenges in that field	JPL · 18285
18286 Kneipp	1973 UN_{5}	Sebastian Kneipp (1821–1897), a German priest, skilled in the art of healing, introduced manifold applications of cold and warm water and suggested that a healthy way of living conformed to nature. His papers were translated into many languages and were an essential influence on modern physical therapeutics and balneology.	JPL · 18286
18287 Verkin	1975 TU_{3}	Boris Ieremievich Verkin (1919–1990), a Ukrainian Soviet physicist and creator of the scientific school of cryogenic physics and technology, was the founder and first director of the Institute for Low Temperature Physics and Engineering in Kharkiv	JPL · 18287
18288 Nozdrachev	1975 VX_{2}	Aleksandr Danilovich Nozdrachev (born 1931), a professor and head of physiology at St. Petersburg University.	JPL · 18288
18289 Yokoyamakoichi	1976 UB_{16}	Koichi Yokoyama (born 1940) is a professor emeritus of the National Astronomical observatory, Japan.	JPL · 18289
18290 Sumiyoshi	1977 DR_{2}	Sumiyoshi, in the south of Osaka prefecture, is an important port for trade between Japan and the Korean Peninsula. The Sumiyoshi Taisha shrine, a guardian of voyage, was founded in 211. At the shrine there is a lighthouse, believed to be the oldest in Japan.	JPL · 18290
18291 Wani	1977 DL_{4}	Wani was a scholar who came to Japan from Korea in the second half of the 4th century. He brought ten volumes of The Analects of Confucius and one volume of the Thousand Character Classic to Japan.	JPL · 18291
18292 Zoltowski	1977 FB	Frank B. Zoltowski (born 1957), an Australian discoverer of minor planets who made numerous critical observations of near-earth objects, notably a dramatic recovery of 1999 AN10, while he was working in South Australia during 1997–1999. He continued to make astrometric contributions on his return to the U.S.	JPL · 18292
18293 Pilyugin	1978 SQ_{4}	Nikolay Alekseyevich Pilyugin, 20th-century Russian designer of autonomous control systems and computers for space rocketry	JPL · 18293
18294 Rudenko	1978 SF_{5}	Anatolij Afanas'evich Rudenko (born 1949) is a full member of the Tsiolkovsky Russian Academy of Cosmonautics and an authority on systems analysis and high technology. He was a member of the team that created aerospace systems and developed powerful liquid-propellant engines	JPL · 18294
18295 Borispetrov	1978 TT_{7}	Boris Mikhajlovich Petrov, Russian journalist, director of the St. Petersburg regional center of the Russian News Agency ITAR-TASS	JPL · 18295

== 18301–18400 ==
back to top

Named minor planet	Provisional	This minor planet was named for...	Ref · Catalog
18301 Konyukhov	1979 QZ_{9}	Fyodor Fyodorovich Konyukhov (born 1951) has performed 50 extensive travels, mainly alone. He conquered both poles and all the highest mountains of the world. The renowned Russian traveler has taken many of the world's most difficult land and sea routes and has sailed around the world three times.	JPL · 18301
18302 Körner	1980 FL_{3}	Harald Körner (1881–1953) was headmaster of the private elementary school in Lund from 1916 to 1944, and a proponent of education for girls.	JPL · 18302
18321 Bobrov	1982 UQ_{10}	Vsevolod Bobrov (1922–1979), a Soviet ice hockey and football champion	JPL · 18321
18322 Korokan	1982 VF_{5}	Korokan was a guest house for foreign envoys built in Chikushi (now Fukuoka city) in the 8th century.	JPL · 18322
18334 Drozdov	1987 RA_{3}	Nikolaj Nikolaevich Drozdov (born 1937), a Russian professor of biology and the author and chief producer of very popular TV program V mire zhivotnykh (In the World of Animals).	JPL · 18334
18335 San Cassiano	1987 SC_{1}	San Cassiano, an Italian village in the hills near Verona in northern Italy, is renowned for its high-quality oil (Grignano) and wine (Amarone). Its isolated location affords views of both the Alps and the Adriatic Sea.	JPL · 18335
18343 Asja	1989 TN	Asja Geyer-Fischer (born 1934) is a splendid pianist with a great love for Mozart and Chopin. She is an especially good teacher for children. In 1962 she followed her husband, astronomer E. H. Geyer to the Boyden Observatory, South Africa, where he had been appointed Director of the observatory for two years.	JPL · 18343
18349 Dafydd	1990 OV_{4}	Dafydd ap Llywelyn (c. 1212–1246), prince of Wales	MPC · 18349
18359 Jakobstaude	1990 TL_{7}	Jakob Staude (born 1944) is staff astronomer at the Heidelberg Max Planck Institute for Astronomy and a well-known expert on star formation. Since 1981 Staude has also served as editor-in-chief of the German journal Sterne und Weltraum.	JPL · 18359
18360 Sachs	1990 TF_{9}	Hans Sachs (1494–1576), master of the shoemaker guild in Nuremberg from 1520, is the most important German poet of the sixteenth century.	JPL · 18360
18365 Shimomoto	1990 WN_{5}	Shigeo Shimomoto (born 1963), a Japanese amateur astronomer and computer programmer.	JPL · 18365
18368 Flandrau	1991 GZ_{1}	The Flandrau Science Center and Planetarium in Tucson, Arizona. It is part of the University of Arizona.	MPC · 18368
18376 Quirk	1991 SQ	Steve Quirk (born 1958), an Australian amateur astronomer and astrophotographer who also operates fireball patrol and meteor video cameras (Src).	MPC · 18376
18377 Vetter	1991 SH_{1}	John Francis Vetter (born 1945), an Australian amateur astronomer and retired automotive mechanic, who established the Mudgee Observatory in 2005 (Src).	IAU · 18377
18379 Josévandam	1991 VJ_{6}	José van Dam (born 1940), a Belgian bass-baritone, who entered the Brussels Royal Conservatory at the age of 17	JPL · 18379
18381 Massenet	1991 YU	Jules Massenet (1842–1912) was a prolific French composer of operas. His greatest successes were Manon (1884), Werther (1892) and Thaïs (1894). The Méditation, a violin solo with orchestra from Thaïs, became world-famous. In 1878 he was elected a member of the Académie des Beaux-Arts	JPL · 18381
18395 Schmiedmayer	1992 SH_{2}	Jörg Schmiedmayer (born 1960), an Austrian physicist and a leading expert in the field of quantum optics.	JPL · 18395
18396 Nellysachs	1992 SN_{2}	Nelly Sachs (1891–1970), a German-Swedish poet, dramatist, and Nobel Prize winner.	JPL · 18396
18398 Bregenz	1992 SQ_{23}	Bregenz, capital of the Austrian province of Vorarlberg	MPC · 18398
18399 Tentoumushi	1992 WK_{1}	The Tentoumushi astronomy club was named after the seven-starred ladybug. The club received an award from the city of Komatsu for its astronomy popularization.	JPL · 18399
18400 Muramatsushigeru	1992 WY_{3}	Shigeru Muramatsu (born 1951), a Japanese amateur astronomer living in Imabari, Ehime.	IAU · 18400

== 18401–18500 ==
back to top

Named minor planet	Provisional	This minor planet was named for...	Ref · Catalog
18403 Atsuhirotaisei	1993 AG	Atsuhiro Ikuta (1999–2011) and Taisei Ikuta (2003–2011) were two brothers who loved the stars. They died in an automobile accident on the night of 2011 December 10, on their return home from viewing a total lunar eclipse	JPL · 18403
18404 Kenichi	1993 FQ_{2}	Kenichi Miyoshi, an amateur astronomer who has contributed to astronomical awareness in Ehime Prefecture over many years.	JPL · 18404
18412 Kruszelnicki	1993 LX	Karl Kruszelnicki (born 1948), an Australian science communicator.	JPL · 18412
18413 Adamspencer	1993 LD_{1}	Adam Spencer (born 1969) is an Australian mathematics communicator, television and radio presenter.	JPL · 18413
18418 Ujibe	1993 TV_{1}	Tadashi Ujibe, an amateur astronomer who constructed the three-meter dome of his own private observatory.	JPL · 18418
18426 Maffei	1993 YN_{2}	Paolo Maffei, Italian astronomer †	MPC · 18426
18430 Balzac	1994 AK_{16}	Honoré de Balzac (1799–1850), the creator of the French realistic novel.	JPL · 18430
18431 Stazzema	1994 BM	Stazzema, a pleasant village located in the Alpi Apuane mountains of Tuscany, Italy. Since 2000, it has been the site of the Italian Park of Peace. Name proposed by Mario Di Martino	JPL · 18431
18434 Mikesandras	1994 EW_{7}	Mike Sandras, American director of the Kenner Planetarium, Louisiana.	JPL · 18434
18441 Cittàdivinci	1994 PE	Vinci is a small beautiful village in Tuscany, where the great genius Leonardo da Vinci was born in 1452. For this reason it is visited by thousands of people each year, eager to visit either the museum or see Leonardo's machines.	JPL · 18441
18449 Rikwouters	1994 PT_{19}	Rik Wouters, 19th/20th-century Belgian fauve painter and sculptor	JPL · 18449
18453 Nishiyamayukio	1994 TT	Yukio Nishiyama (born 1950) is the president of a shipbuilding design company who spends his evenings as an amateur astronomer.	JPL · 18453
18456 Mišík	1995 ES	Vladimír Mišík (born 1947), a Czech rock and blues guitarist, singer and songwriter.	JPL · 18456
18457 Syoheiyamamoto	1995 EX_{7}	Syohei Yamamoto (born 1991), a Japanese speech-language-hearing therapist.	JPL · 18457
18458 Caesar	1995 EY_{8}	Emperor Gaius Julius Caesar (100-44 B.C.) promulgated in 46 B.C. on the advice of the Alexandrine astronomer Sosigenes what is now called the Julian calendar.	JPL · 18458
18460 Pecková	1995 PG	Dagmar Pecková, Czech mezzo-soprano † Archived 2011-05-25 at the Wayback Machine	MPC · 18460
18461 Seiichikanno	1995 QQ	Seiichi Kanno (born 1954) is an education consultant and an amateur astronomer, who has observed the planets since 1970. He built an observatory in Kaminoyama city, Yamagata, in 1989, and now observes the planets with a video camera	JPL · 18461
18462 Riccò	1995 QS_{2}	Annibale Riccò, Italian astronomer †	MPC · 18462
18467 Nagatatsu	1995 SX_{52}	Tatsuo Nagahama (born 1952), an amateur astronomer.	JPL · 18467
18469 Hakodate	1995 UC_{9}	Hakodate, located at the southernmost part of Hokkaido, is a prosperous city of fishing and tourism. The night view from Mount Hakodate is one of the best tourist attractions in Japan	JPL · 18469
18472 Hatada	1995 VA_{1}	Naoki Hatada (born 1967), an editor of the Inagawa Observatory web site since 2003.	JPL · 18472
18473 Kikuchijun	1995 VK_{1}	Jun Kikuchi (born 1967) purchased his first telescope during the height of Halley's Comet fever in 1986. Though cloudy skies thwarted his attempts at comet photography, his interest in solar eclipse photography led him to France in 1999, and to China in 2008 and 2009	JPL · 18473
18493 Demoleon	1996 HV_{9}	Demoleon, a Trojan warrior and son of Antenor, was struck in the head by Achilles' spear	JPL · 18493
18497 Nevězice	1996 LK_{1}	Nevězice, village and place of a Celtic oppidum in central Bohemia, the Czech Republic † ‡	MPC · 18497
18498 Cesaro	1996 MN	Ernesto Cesàro (1859–1906), a prolific mathematician and professor at the universities of Palermo and Naples.	JPL · 18498
18499 Showalter	1996 MR	Mark R. Showalter (born 1957), planetary scientist at the SETI Institute, is (co-)discover of the Jovian gossamer ring, Saturnian moon Pan, Uranian moons Mab and Cupid, two faint Uranian rings, Neptunian moon S/2004 N 1, and Plutonian moons Kerberos and Styx. He is the leader of the Planetary Data Systems Rings Node	JPL · 18499

== 18501–18600 ==
back to top

Named minor planet	Provisional	This minor planet was named for...	Ref · Catalog
18501 Luria	1996 OB	Salvador Edward Luria (1912–1991) was an Italian-American microbiologist. He won the Nobel Prize in Physiology or Medicine in 1969 for his discoveries concerning the replication mechanism and the genetic structure of viruses. He also showed that bacterial resistance to viruses is genetically inherited.	IAU · 18501
18505 Caravelli	1996 PG_{5}	Vito Caravelli (1724–1800), a professor of mathematics at the Naval Institute of Naples.	JPL · 18505
18509 Bellini	1996 RB_{4}	Vincenzo Bellini (1801–1835), an Italian composer best known for his "Norma" and "I puritani".	JPL · 18509
18510 Chasles	1996 SN	Michel Chasles (1793–1880), a professor at the École Polytechnique and later at the Sorbonne.	JPL · 18510
18520 Wolfratshausen	1996 VK_{4}	Wolfratshausen, a city in southern Bavaria, Germany, has a long history extending back to the original name found in court papers by Holy Roman Emperor Heinrich II in 1003. Rainer Maria Rilke (1875–1926) stayed in the city with Lou Andreas-Salome (1861–1937) in 1897	JPL · 18520
18524 Tagatoshihiro	1996 VE_{8}	Toshihiro Taga (born 1951) is a Japanese amateur astronomer and president of the Tottori Society of Astronomy. He is a popularizer of astronomy.	JPL · 18524
18529 Liangdongcai	1996 WK_{3}	Liang Dongcai, renowned biophysicist and academician of the Chinese Academy of Sciences.	IAU · 18529
18531 Strakonice	1996 XM_{2}	Strakonice, a town in southern Bohemia, the Czech Republic † ‡ +	MPC · 18531
18542 Broglio	1996 YP_{3}	Luigi Broglio, Italian aeronautical engineer, conceptor and director of the San Marco programme †	MPC · 18542
18548 Christoffel	1997 AN_{12}	Elwin Bruno Christoffel (1829–1900), a professor at various German universities.	JPL · 18548
18550 Maoyisheng	1997 AN_{14}	Yisheng Mao (1896–1989) was a world-renowned scientist and one of the founders of modern bridge engineering of China. JPL	MPC · 18550
18551 Bovet	1997 AQ_{17}	Daniel Bovet (1907–1992) was a Swiss-born Italian pharmacologist known for his discovery of antihistamines. In 1957 he won the Nobel Prize in Medicine for his discoveries relating to synthetic compounds that inhibit the action of certain body substances and especially their action on the vascular system and the skeletal muscles.	IAU · 18551
18553 Kinkakuji	1997 AZ_{21}	Kinkakuji is the popular name of a gilded pavilion in the Rokuon-ji temple complex (a World Cultural Heritage site) in Kyoto, Japan.	JPL · 18553
18555 Courant	1997 CN_{4}	Richard Courant (1888–1972) studied and later taught at Göttingen. In 1934 he became a professor at New York University, where he founded and led one of the most prestigious institutes of applied mathematics, later named in his honor.	JPL · 18555
18556 Battiato	1997 CC_{7}	Franco Battiato, Italian (Sicilian) polyhedric artist and amateur astronomer †	MPC · 18556
18560 Coxeter	1997 EO_{7}	Harold Scott MacDonald Coxeter (born 1907), an English-Canadian mathematician and former professor at the University of Toronto.	JPL · 18560
18561 Fengningding	1997 EY_{34}	Fengning Ding (born 1994), ISTS awardee in 2012	JPL · 18561
18562 Ellenkey	1997 EK_{54}	Ellen Key (1849–1926) was a Swedish feminist and writer on subjects such as family life, ethics and education. She was on early advocate of child-centered approach to education.	JPL · 18562
18563 Danigoldman	1997 FC_{3}	Danielle Goldman (born 1994), ISTS awardee in 2012	JPL · 18563
18564 Caseyo	1997 GO_{6}	Casey O'Connell, mentor at the ISTS in 2012	JPL · 18564
18565 Selg	1997 GP_{35}	Timothy Selg, mentor at the ISTS in 2012	JPL · 18565
18567 Segenthau	1997 SS_{4}	Segenthau, Banat village and childhood home of the discoverer †	MPC · 18567
18568 Thuillot	1997 TL_{2}	William Thuillot (born 1951) works at the Institut de Mécanique Céleste on the theory of the motions of Jupiter's Galilean satellites, including analysis of observations of eclipses by the planet and mutual phenomena.	JPL · 18568
18572 Rocher	1997 WQ_{22}	Patrick Rocher (born 1951) works at the Institut de Mécanique Céleste in Paris. His main task has been to build an integration package to compute orbital parameters for minor planets and comets.	JPL · 18572
18574 Jeansimon	1997 WO_{23}	Jean-Louis Simon (born 1940) works at the Paris Institut de Mécanique Céleste on analytical planetary theory. He produced the first values of the secular variation of the orbital semimajor axes of the planets.	JPL · 18574
18579 Duongtuyenvu	1997 XY_{6}	Duong Tuyen Vu (born 1933) works at the Paris Institut de Mécanique Céleste on ephemerides of natural satellites.	JPL · 18579
18581 Batllo	1997 XV_{8}	Valerie Batllo (born 1967) works on cometary orbits at the Institut de Mécanique Céleste in Paris. She studies in particular how the short-period comets could be produced by encounters with the giant planets.	JPL · 18581
18583 Francescopedani	1997 XN_{10}	Francesco Pedani (1953–1998) was an amateur astronomer, biologist and school teacher of science and mathematics. In 1988 he founded the Societ Astronomica Fiorentina, an association of amateur astronomers based in Florence, Italy. He was its first president until his untimely death.	JPL · 18583
18593 Wangzhongcheng	1998 AG_{11}	Wang Zhongcheng (born 1925), neurosurgeon-academician of the Chinese Academy of Engineering.	JPL · 18593
18596 Superbus	1998 BA_{4}	Tarquinius Superbus, seventh and last king of Rome, reigned from 534 to 509 B.C.	JPL · 18596

== 18601–18700 ==
back to top

Named minor planet	Provisional	This minor planet was named for...	Ref · Catalog
18601 Zafar	1998 BL_{11}	Abu-Bakr Zafar (born 1985), ISEF awardee in 2003	MPC · 18601
18602 Lagillespie	1998 BX_{12}	Lacy Ann Gillespie (born 1985), ISEF awardee in 2003	MPC · 18602
18605 Jacqueslaskar	1998 BL_{26}	Jacques Laskar (born 1955) is principally concerned with the chaotic behavior of the principal planets. A staff member of the Institut de Mécanique Céleste in Paris, he was the first to show the chaotic motion of the inner solar system and the stabilization of the obliquity of the ecliptic by the moon.	JPL · 18605
18609 Shinobuyama	1998 BN_{48}	Shinobuyama, called "Fuku-Shima" many centuries ago, is a small mountain in Fukushima city, Japan. This beloved mountain is the symbol of the city.	JPL · 18609
18610 Arthurdent	1998 CC_{2}	Arthur Philip Dent, character in The Hitchhiker's Guide to the Galaxy†	MPC · 18610
18611 Baudelaire	1998 CB_{3}	French poet Charles Baudelaire (1821–1867) was one of the major innovators of French literature. His Les Fleurs du Mal (1857) is considered to rank with the finest of French poetry. Baudelaire is particularly known for his excellent translations of Poe's Tales, a writer whose style much resembled his own	JPL · 18611
18617 Puntel	1998 DY_{9}	Nathalie Puntel (born 1968) is a French woman who prefers deep-sky pictures to searches for minor planets.	JPL · 18617
18623 Pises	1998 DR_{13}	Observatoire des Pises, which was inaugurated in 1991, is located in the South of France. It is the Montpellier astronomical society observatory.	JPL · 18623
18624 Prévert	1998 DV_{13}	Jacques Prévert, French poet and screenwriter.	JPL · 18624
18626 Michaelcarr	1998 DO_{23}	Michael Carr (born 1947) is an instrument maker who worked at Caltech and then Princeton University.	JPL · 18626
18627 Rogerbonnet	1998 DH_{33}	Roger-Maurice Bonnet (born 1937) is a French experimental astrophysicist specializing in stellar physics. From 1983 to 2001 he was Science Director of ESA and he created Horizon 2000. Under his lead, ESA launched the scientific projects, Giotto, Hipparcos, ISO, XMM, SOHO, Cluster, Cassini-Huygens and HST.	JPL · 18627
18628 Taniasagrati	1998 DJ_{33}	Tania Sagrati (1967–2012) was the cousin of the second discoverer. She graduated from the Art Institute of Firenze and worked as an interior decorator.	IAU · 18628
18631 Maurogherardini	1998 DQ_{35}	Mauro Gherardini (1941–2008), a surveyor by profession, was a great lover of the sky. He was a popularizer of astronomy, promoting astro-navigation at evening school events.	JPL · 18631
18632 Danielsson	1998 DN_{37}	Ann-Kristin "Kikki" Danielsson (born 1952) is a well-known and popular country singer from Sweden.	JPL · 18632
18634 Champigneulles	1998 EQ_{1}	Champigneulles, Meurthe-et-Moselle, France.	JPL · 18634
18635 Frouard	1998 EX_{1}	Frouard, Meurthe-et-Moselle, France.	JPL · 18635
18636 Villedepompey	1998 EF_{2}	Pompey, a French village	JPL · 18636
18637 Liverdun	1998 EJ_{2}	Liverdun, a French village	JPL · 18637
18638 Nouet	1998 EP_{3}	Nicolas-Antoine Nouet (1740–1811), an astronomer at the Observatoire de Paris, traveled to St. Domingue to map the island. Later he mapped the Rhine region and traveled with Napoleon Bonaparte to Egypt, where he created a map of that country.	JPL · 18638
18639 Aoyunzhiyuanzhe	1998 ER_{8}	Aoyunzhiyuanzhe, meaning "Olympic Games Volunteer", honors the 1.7 million volunteers whose work, devotion, smiles and service during the 2008 Olympic and Paralympic Games touched the whole world, setting a milestone in voluntary service and opening a fresh chapter in volunteerism in China	JPL · 18639
18643 van Rysselberghe	1998 EK_{12}	Théo van Rysselberghe, 19th/20th-century Belgian pointillistic and impressionistic painter	JPL · 18643
18644 Arashiyama	1998 EX_{14}	Arashiyama, situated west of Kyoto city, is the area that includes Arashiyama mountain and the shores of the Katsuragawa river, including the Togetsukyo bridge. It is known nationally for its cherry blossoms and colorful autumn leaves and is designated as a National Historic Site and Place of Scenic Beauty.	JPL · 18644
18647 Václavhübner	1998 FD_{2}	Václav Hübner (1922–2000), a Czech amateur astronomer †	MPC · 18647
18649 Fabrega	1998 FU_{10}	Joaquin Fabrega (born 1967), an amateur astronomer from Panama	JPL · 18649
18653 Christagünt	1998 FW_{15}	Christa and Günter Rothermel, parents of uncredited German co-discoverer Jens Rothermel	MPC · 18653
18656 Mergler	1998 FW_{29}	Natalie Rose Mergler, ISEF awardee in 2003	MPC · 18656
18658 Rajdev	1998 FX_{31}	Priya Ashoke Rajdev, ISEF awardee in 2003	MPC · 18658
18659 Megangross	1998 FD_{33}	Megan Chaya Gross, ISEF awardee in 2003	MPC · 18659
18661 Zoccoli	1998 FT_{34}	Christina Marie Mariolana Zoccoli, ISEF awardee in 2003	MPC · 18661
18662 Erinwhite	1998 FV_{42}	Erin Margaret White, ISEF awardee in 2003	MPC · 18662
18663 Lynnta	1998 FW_{42}	Lynn Marie Torrech-Antonetty, ISEF awardee in 2003	MPC · 18663
18664 Rafaelta	1998 FA_{43}	Rafael Andres Torrech-Antonetty, ISEF awardee in 2003	MPC · 18664
18665 Sheenahayes	1998 FK_{49}	Sheena Marie Hayes, ISEF awardee in 2003	MPC · 18665
18668 Gottesman	1998 FU_{62}	David Alexander Gottesman, ISEF awardee in 2003	MPC · 18668
18669 Lalitpatel	1998 FP_{63}	Lalit Ramesh Patel, ISEF awardee in 2003, and IFAA recipient	MPC · 18669
18670 Shantanugaur	1998 FM_{64}	Shantanu Kadir Gaur, ISEF awardee in 2003	MPC · 18670
18671 Zacharyrice	1998 FX_{64}	Zachary Philip Rice, ISEF awardee in 2003	MPC · 18671
18672 Ashleyamini	1998 FY_{65}	Ashley Ali Amini, ISEF awardee in 2003	MPC · 18672
18675 Amiamini	1998 FJ_{70}	Ami Rebecca Amini, ISEF awardee in 2003	MPC · 18675
18676 Zdeňkaplavcová	1998 FE_{73}	Zdeňka Plavcová, Czech radio-astronomer † Archived 2011-05-25 at the Wayback Machine	MPC · 18676
18679 Heatherenae	1998 FW_{102}	Heather Renae Messick, ISEF awardee in 2003	MPC · 18679
18680 Weirather	1998 FS_{103}	Sara Jo Weirather, ISEF awardee in 2003	MPC · 18680
18681 Caseylipp	1998 FW_{103}	Casey Albert Lipp, ISEF awardee in 2003	MPC · 18681
18689 Rodrick	1998 FR_{124}	Richard Jean Rodrick, ISEF awardee in 2003	MPC · 18689
18697 Kathanson	1998 HB_{39}	Kathleen Suzanne Hanson, ISEF awardee in 2003	MPC · 18697
18698 Racharles	1998 HX_{39}	Rachael Ann Charles, ISEF awardee in 2003	MPC · 18698
18699 Quigley	1998 HL_{45}	Carolyn Ann Quigley, ISEF awardee in 2003	MPC · 18699

== 18701–18800 ==
back to top

Named minor planet	Provisional	This minor planet was named for...	Ref · Catalog
18702 Sadowski	1998 HG_{68}	John Paul Sadowski, ISEF awardee in 2003	MPC · 18702
18704 Brychristian	1998 HF_{87}	Bryan William Christian, ISEF awardee in 2003	MPC · 18704
18707 Annchi	1998 HO_{96}	Ann Chi, ISTS awardee in 2004, and ISEF in 2003	MPC · 18707
18708 Danielappel	1998 HT_{97}	Daniel Clayton Appel, ISEF awardee in 2003	MPC · 18708
18709 Laurawong	1998 HE_{99}	Laura Anne Wong, ISEF awardee in 2003	MPC · 18709
18720 Jerryguo	1998 HP_{145}	Jerry Ji Guo, ISEF awardee in 2003	MPC · 18720
18725 Atacama	1998 JL_{3}	The Atacama Desert, which covers regions II, III and IV of Chile, is the driest desert on Earth.	JPL · 18725
18727 Peacock	1998 KW_{3}	Anthony J. Peacock, British-Dutch(?) project scientist for the European Space Agency Exosat and XMM-Newton missions	JPL · 18727
18728 Grammier	1998 KZ_{3}	Richard ("Rick") S. Grammier (1955–2011) was director of solar system exploration at NASA's Jet Propulsion Laboratory.	JPL · 18728
18729 Potentino	1998 KJ_{4}	Potentino castle, near Seggiano, Tuscany, Italy.	JPL · 18729
18730 Wingip	1998 KV_{7}	Wing Ip (born 1947) is vice chancellor of the university system of Taiwan.	JPL · 18730
18731 Vilʹbakirov	1998 KW_{7}	Vilʹ S. Bakirov (born 1946) is a Ukrainian sociologist, president of the Sociological Association and corresponding member of the National Academy of Sciences of Ukraine. Since 1998 he has served as rector of Kharkiv V. N. Karazin National University, where he has promoted the development of astronomy and other sciences	JPL · 18731
18734 Darboux	1998 MY_{1}	Jean-Gaston Darboux (1842–1917), a French mathematician and professor at the Sorbonne.	JPL · 18734
18735 Chubko	1998 MH_{46}	Larysa Sergiivna Chubko, Ukrainian astronomer	JPL · 18735
18737 Aliciaworley	1998 QP_{79}	Alicia Lorraine Worley, ISEF awardee in 2003	MPC · 18737
18739 Larryhu	1998 SH_{79}	Larry Zhixing Hu, ISEF awardee in 2003	MPC · 18739
18745 San Pedro	1999 BJ_{14}	San Pedro de Atacama, a town in Chile's region II, was inhabited by the Likan Antay population for thousands of years.	JPL · 18745
18747 Lexcen	1999 FN_{21}	Ben Lexcen, Australian marine architect †	MPC · 18747
18749 Ayyubguliev	1999 GA_{8}	Ayyub Guliyev, Azerbaijani astronomer, director of the Shamakhy Astrophysical Observatory	JPL · 18749
18750 Leonidakimov	1999 GA_{9}	Leonid Afanas'evich Akimov, Ukrainian planetary scientist	JPL · 18750
18751 Yualexandrov	1999 GO_{9}	Yurij Vladimirovich Alexandrov, Ukrainian planetary scientist	JPL · 18751
18755 Meduna	1999 GS_{21}	Matthew Paul Meduna, ISEF awardee in 2003	MPC · 18755
18766 Broderick	1999 JA_{22}	Tamara Ann Broderick, ISEF awardee in 2003	MPC · 18766
18768 Sarahbates	1999 JE_{22}	Sarah Woodring Bates, ISEF awardee in 2003	MPC · 18768
18770 Yingqiuqilei	1999 JN_{25}	Yingqiuqi Lei, ISEF awardee in 2003	MPC · 18770
18771 Sisiliang	1999 JA_{26}	Sisi Liang, ISEF awardee in 2003	MPC · 18771
18773 Bredehoft	1999 JY_{36}	Belle Dean Bredehoft, ISEF awardee in 2003	MPC · 18773
18774 Lavanture	1999 JT_{38}	Douglas George Lavanture, ISEF awardee in 2003	MPC · 18774
18775 Donaldeng	1999 JD_{39}	Donald Eng, ISEF awardee in 2003	MPC · 18775
18776 Coulter	1999 JP_{39}	Michael Edward Coulter, ISEF awardee in 2003	MPC · 18776
18777 Hobson	1999 JA_{41}	Christina Nicole Hobson, ISEF awardee in 2003	MPC · 18777
18779 Hattyhong	1999 JN_{44}	Hatty Hong, ISEF awardee in 2003	MPC · 18779
18780 Kuncham	1999 JY_{44}	Vivek Kuncham, ISEF awardee in 2003	MPC · 18780
18781 Indaram	1999 JH_{45}	Maanasa Indaram, ISEF awardee in 2003	MPC · 18781
18782 Joanrho	1999 JJ_{46}	Joan Young Rho, ISEF awardee in 2003	MPC · 18782
18783 Sychamberlin	1999 JL_{47}	Sydney JoAnne Chamberlin, ISEF awardee in 2003	MPC · 18783
18785 Betsywelsh	1999 JV_{48}	Elizabeth Jean Welsh, ISEF awardee in 2003	MPC · 18785
18786 Tyjorgenson	1999 JS_{53}	Tyler Lee Jorgenson, ISEF awardee in 2003	MPC · 18786
18787 Kathermann	1999 JV_{53}	Katherine Laura Hermann, ISEF awardee in 2003	MPC · 18787
18788 Carriemiller	1999 JX_{53}	Carrie Anna Miller, ISEF awardee in 2003	MPC · 18788
18789 Metzger	1999 JV_{56}	Vincent Tyler Metzger, ISEF awardee in 2003	MPC · 18789
18790 Ericaburden	1999 JG_{57}	Erica Mariel Burden, ISEF awardee in 2003	MPC · 18790
18794 Kianafrank	1999 JG_{62}	Kiana Laieikawai Frank, ISEF awardee in 2003	MPC · 18794
18796 Acosta	1999 JH_{64}	Iyen Abdon Acosta, ISEF awardee in 2003	MPC · 18796
18800 Terresadodge	1999 JL_{76}	Terresa Louise Dodge, ISEF awardee in 2003	MPC · 18800

== 18801–18900 ==
back to top

Named minor planet	Provisional	This minor planet was named for...	Ref · Catalog
18801 Noelleoas	1999 JO_{76}	Noelle Joan Oas, ISEF awardee in 2003	MPC · 18801
18803 Hillaryoas	1999 JH_{77}	Hillary Joan Oas, ISEF awardee in 2003	MPC · 18803
18805 Kellyday	1999 JX_{77}	Kelly Jean Day, ISEF awardee in 2003	MPC · 18805
18806 Zachpenn	1999 JX_{79}	Zach Penn, ISEF awardee in 2003	MPC · 18806
18809 Meileawertz	1999 JP_{86}	Meilea Elise Wertz, ISEF awardee in 2003	MPC · 18809
18812 Aliadler	1999 KT_{13}	Alexandra Raisa Adler, ISEF awardee in 2003	MPC · 18812
18814 Ivanovsky	1999 KJ_{17}	Oleg Genrikhovich Ivanovsky, Russian Deputy Chief Designer for the Soviet Luna and Lunokhod missions, a designer for the Vostok spacecraft, director of the Museum of the Lavochkin Space Association in Moscow	JPL · 18814
18818 Yasuhiko	1999 MB_{2}	Yasuhiko Takahashi (born 1934), the younger brother-in-law of the discoverer.	JPL · 18818
18821 Markhavel	1999 NW_{9}	Mark Junichi Havel, ISEF awardee in 2003	MPC · 18821
18823 Zachozer	1999 NS_{20}	Zachary Adam Ozer, ISEF awardee in 2003	MPC · 18823
18824 Graves	1999 NF_{23}	Daniel David Graves, ISEF awardee in 2003	MPC · 18824
18825 Alicechai	1999 NO_{23}	Alice Wan Chai, ISEF awardee in 2003	MPC · 18825
18826 Leifer	1999 NG_{24}	Andrew Michael Leifer, ISEF awardee in 2003	MPC · 18826
18830 Pothier	1999 NZ_{35}	David Guillaume Pothier, ISEF awardee in 2003	MPC · 18830
18836 Raymundto	1999 NM_{62}	Raymund Chun-Hung To, ISEF awardee in 2003	MPC · 18836
18838 Shannon	1999 OQ	Claude Elwood Shannon (1916–2001), an American scientist	JPL · 18838
18839 Whiteley	1999 PG	Brett Whiteley (1939–1992) an Abstract artist and Australia's leading painter of his generation who won all of the major Australian art prizes many times over	JPL · 18839
18840 Yoshioba	1999 PT_{4}	Yoshio Oba (born 1934) is a retired professor of earth sciences at Yamagata University and an amateur astronomer who observes occultations.	JPL · 18840
18841 Hruška	1999 RL_{3}	Luboš Hruška, Czech creator of the Monument to the Victims of Evil in Plzeň †	MPC · 18841
18843 Ningzhou	1999 RK_{22}	Ning Zhou, ISTS awardee in 2004, and ISEF awardee in 2003	MPC · 18843
18845 Cichocki	1999 RY_{27}	Bruno Cichocki, civil engineer and amateur astronomer	JPL · 18845
18851 Winmesser	1999 RP_{84}	Winston Harmon Messer, ISEF awardee in 2003	MPC · 18851
18855 Sarahgutman	1999 RQ_{112}	Sarah Elizabeth Gutman, ISEF awardee in 2003	MPC · 18855
18857 Lalchandani	1999 RE_{117}	Rupa Lalchandani, ISEF awardee in 2003	MPC · 18857
18858 Tecleveland	1999 RO_{117}	Thomas Edgar Cleveland, ISEF awardee in 2003	MPC · 18858
18861 Eugenishmidt	1999 RW_{166}	Eugenia Shmidt, ISEF awardee in 2003	MPC · 18861
18862 Warot	1999 RE_{183}	Gregory Andrew Warot, ISEF awardee in 2003	MPC · 18862
18871 Grauer	1999 VQ_{12}	Albert D. Grauer (born 1942), an American astronomer.	JPL · 18871
18872 Tammann	1999 VR_{20}	Gustav Tammann, Swiss cosmologist †	MPC · 18872
18873 Larryrobinson	1999 VJ_{22}	Larry Robinson, American astronomer †	MPC · 18873
18874 Raoulbehrend	1999 VZ_{22}	Raoul Behrend, Swiss astronomer †	MPC · 18874
18876 Sooner	1999 XM	a "sooner", a person who is settling on land in the early American west before the land was officially open to settlement. The name particularly honors the U.S. state of Oklahoma and the University of Oklahoma, alma mater of the discoverer.	JPL · 18876
18877 Stevendodds	1999 XP_{7}	Steven L. Dodds (born 1961) has been furnishing telescope optics for the astronomical community since 1986. He constructed two parabolic off-axis segments (adaptive optic components) used in the Gemini North 8.1-meter telescope located on Mauna Kea.	JPL · 18877
18880 Toddblumberg	1999 XM_{166}	Todd James Blumberg, ISEF awardee in 2003	MPC · 18880
18883 Domegge	1999 YT_{8}	Domegge di Cadore, a small town nestled in the Northeastern Italian Alps, surrounded by the rose-colored Dolomites, Domegge di Cadore's very dark and clear skies are an inspiration to any astronomer.	JPL · 18883
18887 Yiliuchen	2000 AP_{181}	Yiliu Chen, ISEF awardee in 2003	MPC · 18887
18891 Kamler	2000 EF_{40}	Jonathan Jacques Kamler, ISEF awardee in 2003	MPC · 18891

== 18901–19000 ==
back to top

Named minor planet	Provisional	This minor planet was named for...	Ref · Catalog
18903 Matsuura	2000 ND_{29}	Takeshirou Matsuura (1818–1888), a Japanese geographer and explorer.	JPL · 18903
18905 Weigan	2000 OF_{10}	Wei Gan, ISEF awardee in 2003	MPC · 18905
18907 Kevinclaytor	2000 OW_{20}	Kevin E. Claytor, ISEF awardee in 2003	MPC · 18907
18910 Nolanreis	2000 OR_{22}	Nolan Herman Reis, ISEF awardee in 2003	MPC · 18910
18912 Kayfurman	2000 OM_{32}	Kay Dee Furman, ISEF awardee in 2003	MPC · 18912
18918 Nishashah	2000 OB_{50}	Nisha Vikram Shah, ISEF awardee in 2003	MPC · 18918
18923 Jennifersass	2000 PC_{23}	Jennifer Rose Sass, ISEF awardee in 2003	MPC · 18923
18924 Vinjamoori	2000 PV_{24}	Anant Vinjamoori, ISEF awardee in 2003	MPC · 18924
18928 Pontremoli	2000 QH_{9}	Pontremoli is an Italian town.	JPL · 18928
18930 Athreya	2000 QW_{27}	Khannan Kameshvaran Athreya, ISEF awardee in 2003	MPC · 18930
18932 Robinhood	2000 QH_{35}	Robin Hood, the legendary thirteenth-century English archer and outlaw of Sherwood Forest who, with his band of Merry Men, robbed rich unscrupulous officials to aid and protect the poor in what might be described as a medieval form of socialism	JPL · 18932
18935 Alfandmedina	2000 QE_{37}	Alfredo Andres Medina, ISEF awardee in 2003	MPC · 18935
18938 Zarabeth	2000 QU_{44}	Zarabeth Lehr Golden, ISEF awardee in 2003	MPC · 18938
18939 Sariancel	2000 QZ_{48}	Sari Ancel, ISEF awardee in 2003	MPC · 18939
18943 Elaisponton	2000 QA_{55}	Elais M. Ponton, ISEF awardee in 2003	MPC · 18943
18944 Sawilliams	2000 QG_{61}	Stephanie Alexandra Williams, ISEF awardee in 2003	MPC · 18944
18946 Massar	2000 QM_{75}	Sonny Raye Massar, ISEF awardee in 2003	MPC · 18946
18947 Cindyfulton	2000 QV_{76}	Cindy Marie Fulton, ISEF awardee in 2003	MPC · 18947
18948 Hinkle	2000 QT_{79}	Athena Leah Hinkle, ISEF awardee in 2003	MPC · 18948
18949 Tumaneng	2000 QX_{85}	Karen Andres Tumaneng, ISEF awardee in 2003	MPC · 18949
18950 Marakessler	2000 QX_{95}	Marissa Rachel Kessler, ISEF awardee in 2003	MPC · 18950
18953 Laurensmith	2000 QR_{114}	Lauren Marie Smith, ISEF awardee in 2003	MPC · 18953
18954 Sarahbounds	2000 QT_{119}	Sarah Brittany Bounds, ISEF awardee in 2003	MPC · 18954
18956 Jessicarnold	2000 QK_{126}	Jessica Lynn Arnold, ISEF awardee in 2003	MPC · 18956
18957 Mijacobsen	2000 QE_{128}	Michael Thomas Jacobsen, ISEF awardee in 2003	MPC · 18957
18961 Hampfreeman	2000 QR_{140}	Thomas Hampton Freeman, ISEF awardee in 2003	MPC · 18961
18964 Fairhurst	2000 QJ_{142}	Maggie Sara Fairhurst, ISEF awardee in 2003	MPC · 18964
18965 Lazenby	2000 QR_{142}	Tanya Marie Lazenby, ISEF awardee in 2003	MPC · 18965
18969 Valfriedmann	2000 QY_{152}	Valerie Star Friedmann, ISEF awardee in 2003	MPC · 18969
18970 Jenniharper	2000 QU_{168}	Jennifer Dawn Harper, ISEF awardee in 2003	MPC · 18970
18973 Crouch	2000 QJ_{193}	Kegan Kade Crouch, ISEF awardee in 2003	MPC · 18973
18974 Brungardt	2000 QX_{195}	Adam Robert Brungardt, ISEF awardee in 2003	MPC · 18974
18976 Kunilraval	2000 QH_{206}	Kunil Kaushik Raval, ISEF awardee in 2003	MPC · 18976
18979 Henryfong	2000 RC_{2}	Henry Fong, ISEF awardee in 2003	MPC · 18979
18980 Johannatang	2000 RY_{2}	Johanna Tang, ISEF awardee in 2003	MPC · 18980
18983 Allentran	2000 RG_{6}	Allen Hing Tran, ISEF awardee in 2003	MPC · 18983
18984 Olathe	2000 RA_{8}	Olathe, Kansas, location of the Sunflower Observatory †	MPC · 18984
18987 Irani	2000 RU_{23}	Natasha Rustom Irani, ISEF awardee in 2003	MPC · 18987
18991 Tonivanov	2000 RD_{35}	Tonislav Ivanov Ivanov, ISEF awardee in 2003	MPC · 18991
18992 Katharvard	2000 RK_{40}	Katherine Harvard, ISEF awardee in 2003	MPC · 18992
18994 Nhannguyen	2000 RO_{50}	Nhan Duy Nguyen, ISEF awardee in 2003	MPC · 18994
18996 Torasan	2000 RR_{53}	Kiyoshi Atsumi (1928–1996), Japanese actor known for his roles in the film It's tough being a man and in the "Tora-san" series, of which there were 48 installments during 1969–1995. The Tora-san series became a huge success in Japan and received a National Honor Award in 1996	JPL · 18996
18997 Mizrahi	2000 RG_{54}	Jonathan Albert Mizrahi, ISEF awardee in 2003	MPC · 18997

back to top

Preceded by 17,001–18,000	Meanings of minor-planet names List of minor planets: 18,001–19,000	Succeeded by 19,001–20,000
