= Teenage Dream (T. Rex song) =

Single by Marc Bolan and T. Rex

from the album Zinc Alloy and the Hidden Riders of Tomorrow
- B-side: "Satisfaction Pony"
- Released: 9 February 1974
- Recorded: August 1973, United States
- Genre: Glam rock; soul
- Length: 4:57
- Label: EMI; T. Rex Wax Co
- Songwriter: Marc Bolan
- Producers: Tony Visconti; Marc Bolan

Marc Bolan and T. Rex singles chronology
"Truck On (Tyke)" (1973)	"Teenage Dream" (1974)	"Light of Love" (1974)

"Teenage Dream" is a 1974 single by Marc Bolan and T. Rex, appeared also on the album Zinc Alloy and the Hidden Riders of Tomorrow.

== Background and recording ==
After releasing records under the 'T. Rex' name since 1970, "Teenage Dream" was the first release to be credited to 'Marc Bolan and T. Rex' "Teenage Dream" was co-produced by Tony Visconti and Bolan, and featured Lonnie Jordan of War on piano. It was released as a single in February 1974, and spent five weeks in the UK top 40, peaking at number 13. Biographer Mark Paytress called it Bolan's "coming out record", saying that it was "so drenched in melodramatic resignation that it was less a lament than a lordly glimpse through the iron bars of an increasingly detached existence". The song was described by AllMusic as "a virtual mini-opera", with "soaring strings, wailing guitars, towering chorales, and a genuinely foreboding sense of drama". Ken Barnes of Rolling Stone, however, wrote in a 1974 article that the song "suffers from pointless, jumbled lyrics and self-conscious Dylan-styled intonations and drags on for far too long." Bolan himself regarded "Teenage Dream" as the best lyric he had written. It was also chosen by Bolan's former partner Gloria Jones as her favourite Bolan lyric. He wrote and recorded the song while on tour in the United States in August 1973. It was one of the last tracks written for the Zinc Alloy album and these sessions were the last time Bolan recorded with Visconti.

The original single and album releases end with a fade out at 5 minutes. Several more recent releases include an additional part that the band recorded in 1973, extending the song for another 45 seconds. This extended version was first released in the 1980s, when the Official Marc Bolan Fan Club had the albums originally released on the "T. Rex Wax Co." label – including Zinc Alloy and the Hidden Riders of Tomorrow – reissued on the newly founded "Marc on Wax" label.

== Other releases ==
Some early UK pressings of this single are credited just to "Marc Bolan".

The song was released as a single in France and Germany with "Mad Donna" as the B-side. In Italy it was released with "Venus Loon" on the B-side. The Japanese single on the Odeon label featured "Satisfaction Pony" on the reverse.

In the US, "Teenage Dream" was included on the album Light of Love.

A version of the song was recorded for the BBC, and this was released on the album The BBC Recordings 1970–1976 in 2007.

"Teenage Dream" featured on the soundtrack of the 2010 film Scott Pilgrim vs. the World and the intro of the song was used briefly in the movie.

== Track listing ==
UK/Japanese single

1. "Teenage Dream" – 4:57
2. "Satisfaction Pony" – 3.26

French/German single

1. "Teenage Dream" – 5:00
2. "Mad Donna" – 2:17

Italian single

1. "Teenage Dream"
2. "Venus Loon"

== Cover versions ==
"Teenage Dream" was recorded and released as a single in 1994 by Darryl Read, with T.Rex drummer Bill Legend repeating his performance from the original. Reissued in 2009, the single had a promotional video filmed at the Roundhouse, London with T. Rex fans. It was also recorded by former T. Rex drummer Mickey Finn on his 2002 album Renaissance. In a 2007 concert to commemorate the 30th anniversary of Bolan's death, "Teenage Dream" was performed by Marc Almond.
