= Bolan's Zip Gun =

Bolan’s Zip Gun

Studio album by T. Rex
- Released: February 1975
- Recorded: February – August 1974
- Studio: MRI, Hollywood
- Genre: Psychedelic soul; funk rock
- Length: 33:42
- Label: T. REX (UK); Ariola (Germany)
- Producer: Marc Bolan

T. Rex chronology
Zinc Alloy and the Hidden Riders of Tomorrow (1974)	Bolan’s Zip Gun (1975)	Futuristic Dragon (1976)

Singles from Bolan’s Zip Gun
- 1. "Think Zinc" Released: 1974 (Germany only); 2. "Light of Love" Released: 1974; 3. "Zip Gun Boogie" Released: 1974

Bolan's Zip Gun is the tenth studio album by English rock band T. Rex, released in February 1975 by record label EMI.

Eight of the eleven songs on the album had already been released in the US the previous year on the Light of Love album on Casablanca Records. Zip Gun was the first release of those songs (and three others) in the UK. However, it was the only T. Rex album that failed to chart in the UK.

== Background ==
The critical and commercial failure of the ambitious Zinc Alloy and the Hidden Riders of Tomorrow in early 1974 rattled Bolan, who suddenly became uncertain as to what would please the public. With Bill Legend having quit the T. Rex lineup at the end of 1973, Davey Lutton was made drummer and new girlfriend Gloria Jones was made a permanent member on clavinet and backing vocals. Guitarist Jack Green and singer Pat Hall, who had filled out the band's live lineup in 1973, were dismissed from the group and in July 1974, Dino Dines was added as a second keyboardist. That same month, the new lineup's single "Light of Love" could only manage to reach number 22 on the UK chart, T. Rex's worst placing yet, as the press began to savage him as a portly has-been. As a result, his drinking and cocaine use further increased and he soon left England for tax purposes, settling down in the French Riviera and Hollywood Hills.

== Songs and recording ==
Bolan wanted to continue the funk and soul based direction recently glimpsed on Tanx and especially Zinc Alloy, although the production of the new album featured starker, stripped-down arrangements (perhaps as a reaction to the backlash given the heavily orchestrated Zinc Alloy) and lyrics which were simple and direct, often consisting of just three or four lines repeated over and over. Several of the songs also had a futuristic tone, especially "Space Boss", "Think Zinc", and "Golden Belt", Bolan being a great fan of science fiction. The album also featured a twin-drum sound on some tracks, notably "Solid Baby", provided by Davy Lutton and Paul Fenton.

The first sessions for the new album were held at Scorpio Sound in London at the same time Bolan was producing a solo album for Sister Pat Hall. On 22 February, "Think Zinc", "Solid Baby" and "Teen Angel" were put to tape, while on the 23rd, sax player Howie Casey joined them for "Space Boss" and a remake of "Solid Baby". On the 28th, the outtake "Sky Church Music" was attempted along with a jam of 50s rock'n'roll standards, with additional overdubs to "Think Zinc" on 7 March. In the meantime, Zinc Alloy and the Hidden Riders of Tomorrow was released to a negative reception on 1 March.

Sessions moved to Musicland Studios in Munich, where much of Zinc Alloy had been recorded, from 21–25 March with Bolan as producer. These sessions were considered dispiriting and unproductive although the outtake "Metropolis Incarnate" was attempted on the 21st, followed by two more outtakes "Preacher" and "Saturation Syncopation" plus an early version of "Light of Love" on the 23rd. Two more rehearsals, a Fats Domino cover "I'm In Love Again" and an untitled track known as "Na Na Na", broke down. On 25 March, another attempt at "Light of Love" along with another outtake, "Why Stay", were recorded. Further sessions at Scorpio Sound in April attempted to complete the Pat Hall solo album, although it was to be shelved shortly afterward.

Work on the new T. Rex album continued at MRI Studios in Hollywood with Bolan producing and Gary Ulmer engineering, but with several members of the band not invited; the first session on 14 May resulted in working versions of "Light of Love" and "Token of My Love". On the 17th, a remake of "Metropolis Incarnate" retitled "Teenage Angel" was attempted as well as the only serious recording sessions for the "Children of Rarn" project Bolan had conceived back in 1970, with rough versions of "The Children of Rarn", "We Are Dworn" and "Rarn Rarn" laid to tape along with another outtake, "Video Drama". On 19 May, further work was done on "Light of Love", with "Do I Love Thee", "Golden Belt" (working title "Dishing Fish Wop") and "I Really Love You Babe" (working titles "One From Column 13" and "Precision Debating") being completed on the 21st. 23 May saw working versions of "Precious Star", "Girl In The Thunderbolt Suit", and "Golden Belt", while 28 May produced further work on "Girl In The Thunderbolt Suit" (named "Burrito Blue Jean Wop"), a remake of "Video Drama" and another outtake named "Every Lady". Final overdubbing and mixing proceeded through June and July at MRI, with one final song, "Zip Gun Boogie", recorded in late August at Scorpio Sound. Another track, "Till Dawn" was pulled from the August 1973 sessions for Zinc Alloy and featured Bill Legend on drums.

== Release ==
With cover artwork credited to John Kosh, Bolan’s Zip Gun was released on February 14, 1975 on the T. Rex label (distributed by EMI). Two singles were pulled for release prior to the album: "Light of Love" on July 5, 1974 which reached number 22 in the UK singles chart, and "Zip Gun Boogie" on November 1, which reached number 41. Press coverage for both singles was not favorable, and the album was released to complete indifference from the public, failing to chart at all in the United Kingdom.

Bolan's Zip Gun would be the last T. Rex album to feature Mickey Finn on percussion, who was fired from the group in January 1975.

In 1994, Edsel Records's released Bolan’s Zip Gun as part of their extensive T. Rex reissue campaign, but cut down on the number of bonus tracks. A companion release, entitled Precious Star (The Alternate Zip Gun), was released in 1995 which contained alternative versions, studio rough mixes, a live version and demos of the main album and bonus tracks. A combined album digipak was released in 2002.

== Reception ==
Professional ratings
Review scores
Source	Rating
AllMusic	4/5 stars
New Musical Express	3/5 stars
Pitchfork	5.9/10
PopMatters	4/10

Upon release, Bolan's Zip Gun was poorly received by critics. In the UK, Kate Phillips of NME complained it was "a far cry from the pure voices and guitars of the old Rex days...it might drive you mad, but after six or seven minutes you don't really notice whether it's playing or not". Barbara Charone of Sounds stated that "what sounded like good, simple fun two years ago comes off sounding like inferior exercises in self-indulgence today" while Jan Iles of Record Mirror joked that "most of Marc's rumblings ride faster than a white swan but won't get to the top half as quickly!"

In a retrospective review, AllMusic praised the diversity of the material, with tracks like "the delightful knockabout "Precious Star," the unrepentant boogie of "Till Dawn" and the pounding title track" which was a return to the "understated romp he had always excelled at", "Token of My Love" was described as "equally incandescent" for being a playful blues. Reviewer Dave Thompson noted that a sparser sound "emphasized the rhythms, heightened the backing vocals, and left rock convention far behind. "Light of Love," "Golden Belt" and the heavyweight ballad "I Really Love You Babe"" all had "an earthy authenticity".

Pitchfork wrote, "A purposeful return to the looser sound of Electric Warrior, Gun fires blanks. For all its directness, the album is mostly perfunctory, working some of the same sounds and ideas, but the results lack movement and liveliness; Bolan's mojo definitely wasn't working. Worse, he really doesn't sound invested in these songs." However, reviewer Stephen M. Deusner noted that the alternate takes on the second disc of the 2014 reissue were "rougher and rawer" and "vastly improve on these songs, bringing out a charmingly stiff boogie piano on "Precious Star" and the popping bass line on "Light of Love". PopMatters shared a similar opinion saying that "Zip Gun contains enough good moments to preclude classification as a disaster, but just barely." However, reviewer Whitney Strub praised a few tracks saying, ""Light of Love" opens things on a glam-funk note, and "Precious Star" offers irresistibly creamy doo-wop."

Bolan biographer Mark Paytress called it a "fabulously flawed crystal ball which at its best made a virtue of trance-like repetition years before late seventies Industrial Music and early eighties Hip Hop paved the way for the entire dance music explosion".

== Track listing ==
All tracks are written by Marc Bolan, except as noted.

Side A
No.	Title	Length
1.	"Light of Love"	3:16
2.	"Solid Baby"	2:37
3.	"Precious Star"	2:53
4.	"Token of My Love"	3:40
5.	"Space Boss"	2:49
6.	"Think Zinc"	3:25

Side B
No.	Title	Length
1.	"Till Dawn"	3:02
2.	"Girl in the Thunderbolt Suit"	2:20
3.	"I Really Love You Babe"	3:33
4.	"Golden Belt"	2:41
5.	"Zip Gun Boogie"	3:26

1994 CD reissue bonus tracks
No.	Title	Writer(s)	Length
12.	"Do You Wanna Dance?"	Bobby Freeman	2:13
13.	"(Sittin' On) The Dock of the Bay" (sung by Gloria Jones)	Steve Cropper, Otis Redding	2:20

Precious Star (The Alternate Zip Gun)
No.	Title	Length
1.	"Light of Love"	2:22
2.	"Solid Baby"	2:29
3.	"Precious Star"	2:45
4.	"Token of My Love"	3:40
5.	"Space Boss"	3:17
6.	"Think Zinc"	3:23
7.	"Till Dawn"	4:54
8.	"Girl in the Thunderbolt Suit"	2:42
9.	"I Really Love You Babe (Precision Debating)"	3:06
10.	"Golden Belt"	3:28
11.	"Zip Gun Boogie (Live)"	9:11
12.	"Do You Wanna Dance?"	2:15
13.	"Dock of the Bay"	2:22
14.	"Solid Baby"	6:06
15.	"Till Dawn (Marc's Guide)"	4:44
16.	"Till Dawn"	4:29
17.	"Till Dawn"	4:03
18.	"Girl in the Thunderbolt Suit (Blue Jean Bop)"	2:39
19.	"Dishing Fish Wop (Golden Belt)"	3:17

== Personnel ==
- Marc Bolan – vocals, guitar, DMS (Dartmouth Music Synthesizer) and Moog
- Mickey Finn – hand percussion
- Dino Dines – keyboards
- Gloria Jones – backing vocals, clavinet
- Steve Currie – bass guitar
- Harry Nilsson – backing vocals
- Davy Lutton – drums
- Paul Fenton – additional drums on "Solid Baby"
- Bill Legend – drums on "Till Dawn"

== Charts ==
Chart (1975)	Peak position
Australia (Kent Music Report)	89
