= Paul Fenton =

Paul Fenton may refer to:

- Paul Fenton (musician) (born 1946), English drummer
- Paul Fenton (ice hockey) (born 1959), American ice hockey forward
