= Light of Love =

Studio album by T. Rex
- Released: August 1974
- Recorded: 1973–1974
- Genre: Psychedelic soul; funk rock
- Length: 34:36
- Label: Casablanca
- Producer: Marc Bolan

T. Rex chronology
Zinc Alloy and the Hidden Riders of Tomorrow (1974)	Light of Love (1974)	Bolan's Zip Gun (1975)

Professional ratings
Review scores
Source	Rating
Allmusic	2/5 stars
Rolling Stone	(favorable)
Tom Hull	D

Light of Love is a US and Canada-only album released by British rock band T. Rex in 1974. It is composed of 3 tracks previously released in the UK on the album Zinc Alloy and the Hidden Riders of Tomorrow, together with 8 songs recorded in the Spring of 1974 at Music Recorders Inc. Studios in Hollywood which would later appear on the album Bolan's Zip Gun. The album was engineered by Gary Ulmer and, in the absence of Tony Visconti (who had left T. Rex production duties), was produced by Marc Bolan himself. The album marked the first time that a T. Rex album had been produced without Tony Visconti and also marked Bolan's debut in this role. "Till Dawn", was re-recorded for Bolan's Zip Gun with Bolan at the controls.

The newly recorded songs were licensed by Neil Bogart who had just set up his Casablanca Records label, together with "Teenage Dream", "Explosive Mouth" and "Venus Loon" from the Zinc Alloy and the Hidden Riders of Tomorrow album. Despite considerable publicity and a US tour, Light of Love did not chart in the US. The reasons are disputed, but it permanently ended Bolan's attempts to gain stardom in the United States' pop market. By this point, Bolan's USA record label Reprise Records had dropped him and he had much difficulty finding a new label to sign him, but eventually signed to Casablanca Records. However, Casablanca was going bankrupt around the time and he couldn't find a label to sign him, resulting in this being the last album of the band's to be released in the US. After its failure he concentrated on the UK again (where his career was to experience a resurgence), the new tracks being re-used for the next UK album Bolan's Zip Gun. UK import sales of the Light of Love album may well have impacted the subsequent relative lack of success of Bolan's Zip Gun.

Light of Love was eventually released on CD in the UK in 1995 as part of Edsel Records extensive T. Rex reissue campaign (EDCD 413). Live tracks from the US tour, recorded at the Agora Club in Cleveland, Ohio on 11 November 1974, were released as the bonus disc of the Live 1977 compilation album.

== Track listing ==
All tracks composed by Marc Bolan

1. "Light of Love" – 3:16
2. "Solid Baby" – 2:37
3. "Precious Star" – 2:51
4. "Token of My Love" – 3:39
5. "Space Boss" – 2:47
6. "Think Zinc" – 3:21
7. "Till Dawn" – 3:01
8. "Teenage Dream" – 4:58
9. "Girl in the Thunderbolt Suit" – 2:19
10. "Explosive Mouth" – 2:25
11. "Venus Loon" – 3:02

== Personnel ==
- Marc Bolan – guitar, composer, vocals
- Steve Currie – bass
- Mickey Finn – percussion, conga, vocals, hand percussion
- Gloria Jones – clavinet, backing vocals
- Davey Lutton – drums
- Bill Legend – drums on "Till Dawn", "Teenage Dream", "Explosive Mouth" and "Venus Loon"
- Paul Fenton – additional drums on "Solid Baby"
- Tony Visconti – string arrangements, orchestra
- David Katz – strings, orchestra
