= Zinc Alloy and the Hidden Riders of Tomorrow =

Studio album by Marc Bolan & T. Rex
- Released: 1 March 1974
- Recorded: 20 March - 13 October 1973
- Studio: Musicland (Munich)
- Genres: Psychedelic soul; funk rock; glam rock
- Length: 46:17
- Labels: T. REX (UK); Ariola (Germany)
- Producers: Tony Visconti; Marc Bolan

T. Rex chronology
Tanx (1973)	Zinc Alloy and the Hidden Riders of Tomorrow (1974)	Bolan's Zip Gun (1975)

Singles from Zinc Alloy and the Hidden Riders of Tomorrow
- 1. "Teenage Dream" Released: February 9, 1974

Zinc Alloy and the Hidden Riders of Tomorrow is an album by English rock band T. Rex, the ninth since Tyrannosaurus Rex's debut LP. It was released in March 1974 on the T. Rex record label, distributed by EMI. It was the first and only album to be released under the moniker "Marc Bolan & T. Rex".

Unlike many of T. Rex's previous albums, it was not released domestically in North America; instead, the record company released the U.S.-only Light of Love in August of the same year, featuring three tracks from Zinc Alloy while the remaining songs would appear on the band's next album, Bolan's Zip Gun.

Zinc Alloy was met with bemusement by the listening public. It reportedly confused listeners and divided the band's fanbase at the time, while critical reception was universally negative. Critical re-evaluation has been more favourable, but it remains an oddity in the T. Rex canon due to its style incorporating funk and R&B influences. The album peaked at number 12 in the UK Albums chart.

== Background ==
In the spring of 1973, Marc Bolan was dissatisfied with what he perceived as an insufficient reception to the single "20th Century Boy" (which reached the UK number 3 position that March) and eager to further explore the musical directions glimpsed on the just-released Tanx LP. His two primary influences at this time were his new relationship with musician and songwriter Gloria Jones, and an affection for the black music he heard on radio while touring the US. In the midst of a European tour that March, the band entered Rosenberg Studios in Copenhagen to record new material with producer Tony Visconti once more at the helm.

== Recording ==
The initial session at Rosenberg Studios on 20 March 1973, saw rough early versions of "Liquid Gang", "Superbad" (a working title for "The Avengers"), "The Groover", its B-side "Midnight" and two outtakes, "All My Love" and "Down Home Lady" committed to tape. On 22 March, two more outtakes, "Saturation Syncopation" and "Delanie" were recorded. On 4 April at AIR Studios saw overdubs and mixing of a few prior tracks including "Midnight", while 30 April at Wally Heider Studios in Hollywood produced "Carsmile Smith and the Old One", the B-side "Satisfaction Pony", "Blackjack" and the outtake "Saturday Night" with Gloria Jones and Stephanie Spruill on backing vocals. Mixing and overdubbing was held at AIR back in London on 6–7 May, then moved to Apple Studios on 11 May for working versions of "Squint Eye Mangle" (released with "Blackjack" later in the year as a single by "Big Carrot") and another outtake, "Mr. Motion".

Bolan became one of the first English artists to record in Germany when the sessions moved to Musicland Studios in Munich between 17 and 24 June. The band's lineup expanded at this time, incorporating second guitarist Jack Green (according to tour manager Mick Grey, his participation was minimal), session player B.J. Cole on pedal steel, and backing vocalists 'The Cosmic Choir', a soul duo composed of Gloria Jones and Sister Pat Hall, sometimes augmented by Gloria's brother "Big" Richard Jones. In contemporary interviews Bolan stated "I'm spending a lot more time on recordings now", adding that he intended to remake many of the Copenhagen recordings. Approximately twenty tracks were put down at Musicland including "Galaxy", "Painless Persuasion V" (working title "Look to Your Soul"), "Change", "Nameless Wildness", "Carsmile Smith" (remake), "Liquid Gang" (remake), "Truck On (Tyke)", "Interstellar Soul", "You Got to Jive to Stay Alive", "Spanish Midnight", "The Avengers" (remake), the B-side "Sitting Here" and outtakes "Dance In The Midnight", "Saturday Night" (remake), "Hope You Enjoy The Show" (which was played at a few concerts during this period) and "Plateau Skull" (working title "Twelve Bar Blues").

The band went on a summer tour of America where "Sound Pit Part 1, "Sound Pit Part 2" and "Explosive Mouth" were taped at Sound Pit Studios in Atlanta on 30 July. On 7–9 August at Elektra Sound Recorders in Hollywood, a working version of "Teenage Dream" and further work on "Explosive Mouth" were considered, while on 28–29 August "Till Dawn" and "Venus Loon" were taped at Electric Lady Studios in New York. Between all 1973 sessions some 33 tracks were recorded overall, including 7 non-LP single sides and an additional 11 outtakes, only one of which ("Till Dawn") would see release in Bolan's lifetime.

The album was mixed at AIR Studios after the band's return from their US tour in September, with further overdubbing there on 13 October. The mixing process was difficult as Bolan was heavily addicted to cocaine by this time. He wanted total control of the sessions, often isolating himself in the mixing booth for hours and spurning Visconti's advice; as a result, this would be the last time Visconti worked with the band. By November, at the conclusion of an extensive Far East tour, drummer Bill Legend also quit, noting "I always gave him my best but it wouldn't have taken much for him to give us the occasional word of encouragement...he tended to take everyone for granted".

== Music ==
Marc's ambitions at the time were to fuse glam, pop, soul, funk, psychedelia, and heavy metal into what he called on work-in-progress session sheets "spaceage funk" and "interstellar supersoul". The results were a radical change from the classic T. Rex sound. Journalist Alexis Petridis wrote that the album features a variety of styles including "the funky clavinet, the Jerry Lee Lewis piano, the backing vocals of his new partner Gloria Jones, the strings, the horns and the trebly, distorted guitar on which Bolan would fire off extravagant, Hendrixesque solos." AllMusic described "The Avengers (Superbad)"", "Interstellar Soul" and "Liquid Gang" as "solid James Brown drive".

== Title and album cover ==
The original title of the album was A Creamed Cage in August with the artist name to be Zinc Alloy and the Hidden Riders of Tomorrow, which at the time he insisted was a send-up of the two Stardusts, Ziggy and Alvin. The record company balked, however, largely because the photo of Bolan to be used on the cover featured him with a dramatically short haircut and nearly unrecognizable. To ensure that record buyers knew who it was, the label insisted that a red banner strip stating "Marc Bolan & T. Rex" appeared on the top left corner with the title Zinc Alloy and the Hidden Riders of Tomorrow at the bottom, now relegating A Creamed Cage in August to a secondary title on the back side.

Marc had wanted the album package to be an extravagant multi-layered triple gatefold sleeve designed by John Kosh consisting of a latticework image on the front featuring Bolan's face in a pale gold surround with cage bars revealing another facial shot underneath, meant to fold-out into the 'Creamed Cage' of the subtitle. The 1973 oil crisis ended up limiting the design to an initial 1500 pressings, individually numbered like The Beatles' White Album and now very collectible, with the normal edition being a standard gatefold. Kosh's original package design won at the London Art Director's Association awards and was exhibited at the Design Centre.

== Release ==
The album was released on 1 March 1974, five weeks after the end of the group's first major UK tour in over a year. Despite arriving in shops directly after the tour, it did nothing to revive Bolan's sagging fortunes, spending just three weeks on the UK Albums chart where it peaked at number 12, while the lead single, "Teenage Dream", reached number 13 in the singles chart.

At the time of the UK release, Bolan's U.S. label Reprise had dropped Bolan and he was struggling to find another U.S. label to sign with. By the time he got a deal with Casablanca Records, he had recorded much new material, which the new record company decided to release along with a couple of tracks from Zinc Alloy as the Light of Love album in September 1974; thus, neither Zinc Alloy nor Bolan's Zip Gun were issued in the U.S. in the 1970s.

A companion release to the later Demon Records reissue, entitled Change (The Alternate Zinc Alloy), was released in 1995 and contained alternative versions, studio rough mixes, and demos of the main album and bonus tracks. The two were combined for a 2CD edition, which was released by Edsel and Rhino Records in 2002. Another reissue with rarities was issued in 2014.

== Critical reception ==
Professional ratings
Review scores
Source	Rating
AllMusic	4.5/5 stars
Pitchfork	5.8/10
Uncut	7/10

Zinc Alloy was poorly received upon release, with nearly universally hostile reviews. The British press slammed T. Rex for copying the title of the album from Bowie's The Rise and Fall of Ziggy Stardust and the Spiders from Mars, even though Bolan had spoken of releasing work under the pseudonym "Zinc Alloy" during the late 1960s. One of the few exceptions was Chris Welch at Melody Maker, who opined "there's a lot more life, guts and twists of the unexpected here than on many a more serious work" before going on to praise "Venus Loon", "Sound Pit", and "The Leopards". On the other hand, Steve Peacock of Sounds drolly stated "my idea of purgatory would be to be marooned on a desert island with a gramophone and copy of this album" while Andrew Tyler of NME groaned that "Bolan has conjured up a series of ponderous titles that he uses as a vehicle to project his inane curly-haired stud image...the whole thing puts you in mind of a half-cocked production-line band content at one stab of glory."

Retrospective reviews have been more favourable. AllMusic praised the song "You've Got to Jive to Stay Alive" as "implausibly slight, but impressively groove-ridden". In a review rated 7 out of 10, Uncut wrote: "Bolan, newly enchanted with singer Gloria Jones, gives fuller vent to funk and R&B influences, predating by several months Bowie’s and Elton John’s interest in disco and Philly soul." "Bolan was still clearly capable of inspired creativity – the dark, twisted "Explosive Mouth" and "Change" are particularly great". "The enjoyably sub-Dylan melodrama of "Teenage Dream"". The Quietus praised most of the songs, saying: "'Venus Loon' and 'Sound Pit' are startling, fantastic openers, bustling with heavy-hitting proto-disco grooves and the kind of dramatic string-stabs more akin to the Chi-Lites or O'Jays than the purely rock & roll influences of yore. Even when he does step back to the boogie of 'Explosive Mouth' there's an almost Beefheartian oddity to the grooves and shapes, a committed surrealism to the lyrics, an honesty about his own self-delusion and the destructiveness of his fantasism that imply far more self-awareness than the official story of Bolan's demise allows." Reviewer Neil Kulkarni further said that tracks like "'Galaxy' and 'Teenage Dream' swim in exquisitely dreamy breaks and bridges", featuring "the sweetly soulful harmonies and ultra-phased fades". Musically, it is said that Bolan "blends soul with funk, acid-rock, rockabilly, adds it to his palette to create a uniquely twisted stew still all his own". "'Liquid Gang', 'Carsmile Smith' and 'Painless Persuasion' are some of the most gloriously over-the-edge anthems he ever wrote, and when the band gets funky ('You've Got To Jive', 'Interstellar Soul' and 'The Avengers') they manage to be more lethally in the pocket than any of the other white rockers then trying to tap a little of James Brown's ancient-futurist magic (e.g. Led Zep, the Stones). 'The Leopards' fades you out with Marc not even singing – rapping like a Dadaist Last-Poet/Watts-Prophet, tentatively but tantalisingly hitting on an almost entirely new-type of music, somewhere 'tween Kevin Ayers and Iceberg Slim." He concluded saying that Zinc Alloy was a "fantastic mess".

The Guardian wrote that it is "better than its reputation suggests". Reviewer Alexis Petridis qualified "Teenage Dream" as "floridly elegiac" "and sufficiently ahead of the curve to start experimenting with soul music 18 months before Bowie released Young Americans". Petridis concluded that Bolan "was aiming for a sort of Spectoresque wall-of-sound effect and slightly missing the mark". Record Collector dubbed it a "reMarcable musical fusion".

== Legacy ==
AllMusic wrote that Zinc Alloy predated the change of style of Bolan's peers, saying: "soul-soaked songs like these aren't simply a new direction. They are the very signposts which would soon be guiding so many other English rock talents down some very unfamiliar alleyways. Zinc Alloy was released in March 1974. Bowie began rehearsing his Philly Dogs tour in July".

== Track listing ==
All tracks are written by Marc Bolan.

Side A
No.	Title	Length
1.	"Venus Loon"	3:01
2.	"Sound Pit"	2:50
3.	"Explosive Mouth"	2:26
4.	"Galaxy"	1:48
5.	"Change"	2:47
6.	"Nameless Wildness"	3:06
7.	"Teenage Dream"	5:45

Side B
No.	Title	Length
1.	"Liquid Gang"	3:17
2.	"Carsmile Smith & the Old One"	3:16
3.	"You've Got to Jive to Stay Alive – Spanish Midnight"	2:35
4.	"Interstellar Soul"	3:26
5.	"Painless Persuasion v. the Meathawk Immaculate"	3:26
6.	"The Avengers (Superbad)"	4:28
7.	"The Leopards Featuring Gardenia & the Mighty Slug"	3:36

1994 CD reissue bonus tracks
No.	Title	Length
15.	"The Groover"	3:24
16.	"Midnight"	2:49
17.	"Truck On (Tyke)"	3:09
18.	"Sitting Here"	2:21
19.	"Satisfaction Pony"	2:49

Change (The Alternate Zinc Alloy)
No.	Title	Length
1.	"Venus Loon"	3:05
2.	"Sound Pit (Parts 1 & 2)"	3:01
3.	"Explosive Mouth"	2:33
4.	"Galaxy"	1:03
5.	"Change (Signs)"	1:54
6.	"Nameless Wildness"	5:19
7.	"Teenage Dream"	5:57
8.	"Liquid Gang"	2:56
9.	"Carsmile Smith & the Old One"	2:34
10.	"Spanish Midnight"	0:37
11.	"Insterstellar Soul"	1:55
12.	"Painless Persuasion v. the Meathawk Immaculate"	3:29
13.	"The Avengers (Superbad)"	3:27
14.	"The Leopards Featuring Gardenia & the Mighty Slug"	2:28
15.	"The Groover"	2:50
16.	"Midnight"	2:48
17.	"Truck On (Tyke)"	1:40
18.	"Sitting There (Sitting Here)"	2:01
19.	"Satisfaction Pony"	3:27
20.	"Nameless Wildness" (Acoustic Demo)	1:47
21.	"Carsmile Smith & the Old One" (Solo / Acoustic Demo)	1:45
22.	"Carsmile Smith & the Old One" (Acoustic Demo with Organ)	1:17
23.	"The Avengers (Superbad)" (Acoustic Demo)	2:50
24.	"The Leopards Featuring Geraldine & the Mighty Slug" (Acoustic Demo)	1:08

== Personnel ==
T. Rex

- Marc Bolan – vocals, guitar, producer
- Mickey Finn – percussion
- Bill Legend – drums
- Steve Currie – bass

with:

- Danny Thompson – double bass
- B.J. Cole – steel guitar
- Jack Green – guitar
- Lonnie Jordan – keyboards
- The Cosmic Choir: Big Richard, Gloria Jones, Sister Pat Hall – backing vocals
- Tony Visconti – production, mixing, string arrangements, mellotron
- Paul Fenton – drums
- John Kosh – album cover designer and art director

== Charts ==
Chart (1974)	Peak position
Australia (Kent Music Report)	45
UK Albums Chart	12
