= Humanesque =

Studio album by Jack Green
- Released: June 1980
- Genre: Rock
- Length: 38:10
- Label: RCA
- Producer: Jack Green

Jack Green chronology
Humanesque (1980)	Reverse Logic (1981)

Professional ratings
Review scores
Source	Rating
Allmusic	4/5 stars

Humanesque is Jack Green's debut album. The track "I Call, No Answer" features Ritchie Blackmore of Deep Purple as a guest artist on lead guitar.

== Track listing ==
- All songs by Jack Green and Leslie Adey, except noted
1. "Murder" – 3:21
2. "So Much" – 3:52
3. "Valentina" – 4:22
4. "Babe" (Jack Green) – 3:33
5. "Can't Stand it" – 3:35
6. "I Call, No Answer" (Jack Green) – 3:33
7. "Life on the Line" – 4:03
8. "'Bout That Girl" (Jack Green) – 3:02
9. "Thought it was Easy" (Jack Green, Jackie Green) – 2:48
10. "Factory Girl" – 2:49
11. "This is Japan" – 3:12

== Charts ==
Chart (1981)	Peak position
Australian (Kent Music Report)	68

== Personnel ==
- Jack Green – Bass, Guitar, and Vocals.
- Ritchie Blackmore – Lead Guitar on "I Call, No Answer".
- Brian Chatton – Keyboards.
- Mel Collins – Saxophone.
- Pete Tolson – Guitar.
- Andy Dalby – Guitar.
- Ian Ellis – Bass guitar.
- Mac Poole – Drums.
- John Warwicker – Design.
- Le Breton – Design.
- Peter Kuys – Executive producer.
