= Pierre de Larivey =

French dramatist

Pierre de Larivey (20 July 1549 – 12 February 1619) was a French dramatist of Italian origin. He is credited with introducing the Italian "comedy of intrigue" into France.

== Life ==
Little is known of Larivey's biography. The suggestion made by Pierre Grosley of Troyes that Pietro Giunti, called "Larivey" (the name Larivey or l'Arrivey would have been taken by way of translation from giunto) was a member of the family of the Giunti, the famous printers of Florence and Venice, is subject to caution.

Larivey's family was established at Troyes in the Champagne region. Pierre studied law in Paris, and was in close contact with the milieu of the lawyers of Parlement. He participated in a literary circle around Jean Voyer and frequented the jurist Gilles Bourdin (Larivey would write 2 sonnets to his memory) and met there the dramatists Guillaume Le Breton and François d'Amboise. He was friends with Gilles Corrozet.

In 1572, he accompanied François d'Amboise into Poland, on a diplomatic mission and would return the year later for the crowning of the Duke of Anjou (future king Henry III) elected King of Poland. In 1585, in Paris, he was accorded the benefice of the chapel of Saint-Léonard. After, he acted as clerk to the chapter of the church of St Etienne at Troyes, and he eventually became a canon. The first volume of the Comedies facetieuses appeared in 1579, and the second in 1611. Only nine in all were printed.

== Works ==
Larivey is the author of nine plot-centered "comedies of intrigue" in prose adapted (rather than "translated") from Italian originals. He has no claim to be the originator of French comedy—the Corrivaux of Jean de la Taille dates from 1562—but Larivey naturalized the Italian comedy of intrigue in France. Despite closely following his Italian models, he succeeded in conveying a lively spoken language, often full of saucy humor. The licence of the manners depicted in these plays is matched by the coarseness of the expression. Larivey's merit lies in the use of popular language in dialogue, which often rises to real excellence, and was not without influence on Molière and Regnard. Molière's L'Avare (The Miser) owes much to the scene in Larivey's masterpiece, Les Esprits, where Séverin laments the loss of his purse, and the opening scene of the play seems to have suggested Regnard's Retour imprévu. It is uncertain whether Larivey's plays were represented, though they were evidently written for the stage. In any case, prose comedy gained very little ground in popular favor before the time of Molière.

In 1579, at Paris (with the publisher Abel L'Angelier), he published six farcical comedies:

- Le Laquais, a version of Ludovico Dolce's Il Ragazzo - Larivey introduces the character of the pedant.
- La Veuve, a version of Niccolò Buonaparte's La Vedova
- Les Esprits, a version of Lorenzino de' Medici's L'Aridosia
- Le Morfondu, a version of Antonio Francesco Grazzini's La Gelosia
- Les Jaloux, a version of Vincenzo Gabbiani's I Gelosi
- Les Escolliers, a version of Girolamo Razzi's La Cecca

The scene of these comedies is Paris. In his author's epistle to this edition, he catalogues briefly the names of his Italian models.

In 1611, in Troyes (with the publisher Pierre Chevillot), he published his Three New Comedies (Trois Nouvelles Comédies). Their tone is different from the preceding. The plots center less around overcoming obstacles to love and the characters are already married. The "unity of action", one of the Three Unities, is better respected and Larivey brings fewer modifications to the Italian originals. In his epistle to the edition (dedicated to François d'Amboise), Larivey explains how he came upon these comedies one day while cleaning his study and decided to rework them in the French manner ( "me print envie d'agencer un peu de livres que j'ay en mon estude [...] je trouvay de fortune entre quelques brouillards et manuscripts six [...] comedies toutes chargées de poussières [...]. j'ay tasché de les r'habiller [...] à la façon de ce pays").

- La Constance, a version of Girolamo Razzi's La Gostanza
- Le Fidèle, a version of Luigi Pasqualigo's Il Fedele
- Les Tromperies, a version of Nicolὸ Secchi's Gl'Inganni

The plot of these stories takes place in Troyes.

Early in his career, Larivey worked as a translator of other Italian works, including The Facetious Nights of Straparola (Facétieuses Nuits, 1573) of Straparole (Giovanni Francesco Straparola), the Philosophie fabuleuse (1577), the Philosophie (1581) of Piccolomini (Pope Pius II), and The Discourses of Capelloni (1595). In 1604, he published a translation of Ilumaniti de Jesus-Christ by Pietro Aretino.
