= Light of Love (T. Rex song) =

Single by T. Rex

from the album Bolan's Zip Gun
- B-side: "Explosive Mouth"
- Released: 13 July 1974
- Genre: Glam rock
- Length: 3:17
- Label: EMI (UK)
- Songwriter: Marc Bolan
- Producer: Marc Bolan

T. Rex singles chronology
"Teenage Dream" (1974)	"Light of Love" (1974)	"Zip Gun Boogie" (1974)

"Light of Love" is a 1974 single by the British glam rock band T. Rex. The track is taken from the album Bolan's Zip Gun whilst its B-side, "Explosive Mouth", features on the 1974 album Zinc Alloy and the Hidden Riders of Tomorrow. In the US, both songs appeared on the US only compilation album Light of Love. Rolling Stone magazine's Ken Barnes praised the single's "upbeat" and "economical" sound in a 1974 review, claiming Bolan's new output to be "fresh and attractive".

"Light of Love" was produced by Marc Bolan; it was the first T. Rex single on which the production did not involve Tony Visconti.

The single was in the UK Singles Chart for a total of five weeks, peaking at number 22, and is notable as being the first T. Rex single to miss the Top 20. It appeared as the closing track on the end credits for the Vince Vaughn film, Delivery Man (2013).
