= The Groover (T. Rex song) =

Single by T. Rex
- B-side: "Midnight"
- Released: 6 June 1973
- Genre: Glam rock
- Length: 3:24
- Label: T. Rex Wax Co; EMI (UK)
- Songwriter: Marc Bolan
- Producer: Tony Visconti

T. Rex singles chronology
"20th Century Boy" (1973)	"The Groover" (1973)	"Truck On (Tyke)" (1973)

"The Groover" is a 1973 single by English glam rock band T. Rex. Neither the track nor its B-side are taken from an album. However, they are often added as bonus material on re-releases of the 1974 album Zinc Alloy and the Hidden Riders of Tomorrow.

The single was in the UK Singles Chart for a total of nine weeks, peaking at number 4, making it the last T. Rex song to enter the top ten.

"The Groover" and its b-side "Midnight" were first recorded on 20 March 1973 at Rosenberg Studios in Copenhagen, with later overdubs back in London at the end of the month. The original master tape, later released on the Bump'n'Grind archival compilation, contains several more minutes of Bolan's closing guitar solo as the song evolves into a jam. A promotional video, primarily featuring Bolan prancing around in a film studio intercut with live clips of the group, was shot on 3 May.

The single was released on 1 June to a relatively tepid reception compared to earlier hits, although it still managed to reach number 4 in the UK, becoming the group's final top ten. Other glam acts such as David Bowie and Slade were now effortlessly topping the charts as T. Rex had a year earlier; the group were still huge but some journalists now wondered if their glam crown was slipping compared to the competition. Critical reception in the UK was particularly sour, with Steve Peacock of Sounds noting that "any competent producer could have fed in the relevant information from their past singles and made this one just as well" while Charles Shaar Murray of NME claimed "very much the same mixture as before" and instead recommend the flip side, calling it "infinitely superior". By contrast, Cash Box in the US said it was "a remarkable dance item that should drive [T. Rex's] huge following absolutely wild".

== Personnel ==
- Marc Bolan – lead vocals, guitar, backing vocals
- Mickey Finn – congas
- Steve Currie – bass guitar
- Bill Legend – drums
- Tony Visconti – producer, backing vocals
