= Lebreton =

Lebreton, which may also appear as Le Breton or LeBreton, is a surname. Notable people with the surname include:

Listed alphabetically by given name

- Alexis le Breton (born 1985), South African cricketer
- André le Breton (1708–1779), French publisher
- Anna Letitia Le Breton (1808–1886), English author and memoirist
- Auguste Le Breton (1913–1999), French crime novelist
- Flora Le Breton (1899–1951), English silent film actress
- George LeBreton (1810–1844), pioneer politician in the Oregon Country
- Gilles Lebreton (born 1958), French jurist and politician
- Guillaume Le Breton, French dramatist of the sixteenth century
- Hervey le Breton (died 1131), Breton cleric who became Bishop of Bangor in Wales and later Bishop of Ely in England
- Jean-Pierre Lebreton (born 1949), scientist at ESA, and the Huygens Project Scientist and Mission Manager
- Julie Le Breton, French Canadian actress
- Ken Le Breton (1924–1951), international speedway rider
- Louis Le Breton (1818–1866), French painter who specialised in marine paintings
- Marjory LeBreton (born 1940), Leader of the Government in the Canadian Senate
- Patrick Lebreton (born 1963), member of the National Assembly of France
- Paul Lebreton (1870–1956), French tennis player
- Pierre-Montan Berton (1727–1780), called Le Breton, French composer and conductor
- Richard le Breton (fl. 1170), one of the four knights who murdered Saint Thomas Becket
- Sarah Willie-LeBreton, American sociologist and academic administrator

== Other uses ==
- 18100 Lebreton, a main-belt asteroid
- LeBreton Dorgenois (fl. 1812), briefly served as the mayor of New Orleans
- LeBreton Flats, a neighbourhood of Ottawa, Canada
  - Lebreton Station, the former name of a rail station located here
