= Truck On (Tyke) =

Single by T. Rex

from the album Zinc Alloy and the Hidden Riders of Tomorrow
- B-side: "Sitting Here"
- Released: 16 November 1973
- Genre: Pop; glam rock
- Length: 3:09
- Label: EMI (UK)
- Songwriter: Marc Bolan
- Producer: Tony Visconti

T. Rex singles chronology
"The Groover" (1973)	"Truck On (Tyke)" (1973)	"Teenage Dream" (1974)

"Truck On (Tyke)" is a 1973 single by the British glam rock band T. Rex, released 16 November 1973. Neither the track nor its B-side, "Sitting Here", appeared on an original T. Rex studio album, but both were added as bonus material on re-releases of the 1974 album Zinc Alloy and the Hidden Riders of Tomorrow. The record was poorly received critically and did not perform as well in the charts as previous T. Rex singles. The single was in the UK Singles Chart for a total of eleven weeks, peaking at No. 12, "Truck On (Tyke)" was the second to last T. Rex single, before 1974's "Teenage Dream", to break the top 20 until 1975's "New York City". Marc Bolan acknowledged that "Truck On (Tyke) is my 14th hit record and I wouldn't be at all surprised if it didn't make number one." Later, Bolan would claim the move to be deliberate, stating that its release "was a planned thing. I wanted something not so good to happen to compare it (future material) against".
