= 18117 Jonhodge =

Main-belt asteroid

Discovery
- Discovered by: LONEOS
- Discovery site: Anderson Mesa Stn.
- Discovery date: 5 July 2000

Designations
- Named after: Jonathon Hodge (American teacher)
- Alternative designations: 2000 NY_{23} · 1993 RK_{8} 1997 WU_{27} · 1999 FB_{22}
- Minor planet category: main-belt · (inner) background

Orbital characteristics
- Epoch 4 September 2017 (JD 2458000.5)
- Uncertainty parameter 0
- Observation arc: 23.63 yr (8,630 days)
- Aphelion: 2.5586 AU
- Perihelion: 2.1464 AU
- Semi-major axis: 2.3525 AU
- Eccentricity: 0.0876
- Orbital period (sidereal): 3.61 yr (1,318 days)
- Mean anomaly: 312.54°
- Mean motion: 0° 16^{m} 23.52^{s} / day
- Inclination: 1.1404°
- Longitude of ascending node: 274.79°
- Argument of perihelion: 347.25°

Physical characteristics
- Dimensions: 3.155±0.099 km
- Geometric albedo: 0.407±0.038
- Absolute magnitude (H): 14.6

18117 Jonhodge (provisional designation 2000 NY_{23}) is a bright background asteroid from the inner regions of the asteroid belt, approximately 3 kilometers in diameter. It was discovered on 5 July 2000, by astronomer of the Lowell Observatory Near-Earth Object Search at Anderson Mesa Station near Flagstaff, Arizona, in the United States. The asteroid was named after American teacher Jonathon Hodge.

== Orbit and classification ==
Jonhodge is a non-family asteroid from the main belt's background population. It orbits the Sun in the inner main-belt at a distance of 2.1–2.6 AU once every 3 years and 7 months (1,318 days). Its orbit has an eccentricity of 0.09 and an inclination of 1° with respect to the ecliptic.

The body's observation arc begins with its first identification as 1993 RK_{8} at La Silla Observatory in September 1993, almost 7 years prior to its official discovery observation at Anderson Mesa.

== Physical characteristics ==
The asteroid's spectral type is unknown. Based to its high albedo (see below), it is likely of a stony rather than carbonaceous composition.

=== Diameter and albedo ===
According to the survey carried out by the NEOWISE mission of NASA's Wide-field Infrared Survey Explorer, Jonhodge measures 3.155 kilometers in diameter and its surface has a high albedo of 0.407.

=== Photometry ===
As of 2017, no rotational lightcurve of Jonhodge has been obtained from photometric observations. The body's rotation period, poles and shape remain unknown.

== Naming ==
This minor planet was named after Jonathon Hodge ("Jon Hodge") (born 1948 – January 4, 2006), a teacher of astronomy and science to college students, schoolchildren and the general public. The official naming citation was published by the Minor Planet Center on 15 December 2005 (M.P.C. 55722). Proposal for asteroid honor by Thor Dockweiler to Simon P. Balm (UCLA and Santa Monica College), who then submitted it to Donald Keith Yeomans at the JPL.

=== Jonathon Hodge ===
Hodge taught at Santa Monica College and served as the director (1976–2005) of the Santa Monica College Planetarium (now Drescher Planetarium), following an earlier period as a regular lecturer at the Griffith Observatory in Los Angeles. Hodge also coordinated an annual astronomical lecture series at the University of California, Los Angeles (UCLA). Hodge, along with astronomy professor "Woody" Sobel (Heywood Sobel), was instrumental in encouraging Robert P. Lozano to establish the Santa Monica Amateur Astronomy Club in 1981. Hodge was a member of the Astronomical Society of the Pacific and the International Planetarium Society. Hodge in his younger years majored in astronomy and graduated from the University of Southern California in Los Angeles with a degree in the history of medieval science, a side interest that would serve him well during his career in education and planetariums.
