= Reverse Logic =

Studio album by Jack Green
- Released: 1981
- Genre: Rock
- Length: 41:16
- Label: RCA
- Producer: Jack Green

Jack Green chronology
Humanesque (1980)	Reverse Logic (1981)	Mystique (1983)

Reverse Logic is a rock album released by Jack Green in 1981.

== Track listing ==
All songs by Jack Green, except noted

1. "One By One" – 3:39
2. "(Why Don't You) Let Me Go" – 4:24
3. "Cold Modern Day" – 3:52
4. "When I Was Young" (Jack Green, Leslie Adey) – 3:23
5. "It's A Hard World" – 3:52
6. "Let It Rock" – 2:56
7. "Too Many Fools" – 3:05
8. "Set Me Free" – 3:42
9. "Brave Madonna" – 3:28
10. "Sign of The Times" (Jack Green, Pete Tolson) – 5:24
11. "Promises" – 3:31
