= Guillaume Le Breton =

Guillaume Le Breton (sometimes also called Gabriel) was a French dramatist of the sixteenth century. Little is known of his life, although the title of his play Adonis mentions he was from the Nièvre region. Like his contemporary François d'Amboise, he associated himself with the king's Procureur général, Gilles Bourdin, as well as other dramatists of the period, such as Odet de Turnèbe and Pierre de Larivey.

According to François d'Amboise, Le Breton wrote several tragedies — Tullie, Charité, Didon and Dorothée — which are today lost. His only extant theatrical work is a mythological play entitled Adonis, which was probably produced in 1569 before Charles IX, then again eight years later at the Hôtel de Bourgogne, and finally in 1579 at the Collège de Boncourt.

Le Breton was also responsible for a translation of the travels of Cortés.

== Works ==
Original editions:

- Hernán Cortés, Voyages et conquestes du capitaine Ferdinand Courtois, es Indes occidentales, histoire traduite de la langue espagnole par Guillaume le Breton, Paris, A. L'Angelier, 1588, in-12, 416 ff.
- L'Adonis, tragédie de Guillaume Le Breton Nivernois, Paris, Abel L'Angelier, in Diverses tragedies de plusieurs autheurs de ce temps, 1597, in-12

Modern editions:

- Théâtre français de la Renaissance, la tragédie à l’époque d’Henri III, deuxième série, vol. 1 (1574-1579), Florence-Paris, Olschki-PUF, 1999. Edited by Mario Bensi.
