= Zip Gun Boogie =

Single by Marc Bolan (on original issue) / T. Rex (on reissues)

from the album Bolan's Zip Gun
- B-side: "Space Boss"
- Released: 1 November 1974
- Genre: Glam rock
- Length: 3:26
- Label: EMI (UK)
- Songwriter(s): Marc Bolan
- Producer(s): Marc Bolan

Marc Bolan (on original issue) / T. Rex (on reissues) singles chronology
"Light of Love" (1974)	"Zip Gun Boogie" (1974)	"New York City" (1975)

Audio
- "Zip Gun Boogie" on YouTube

"Zip Gun Boogie" is a 1974 single, originally credited in the UK as a solo single by Marc Bolan of the British glam rock band T. Rex. In other territories, the single was credited to "T. Rex" or "Marc Bolan and T. Rex"; almost all reissues of the track credit it solely to T. Rex. The track and its B-side feature on the 1975 T. Rex album Bolan's Zip Gun.

The single was in the UK Singles Chart for a total of three weeks, peaking at number 41, making it T. Rex's lowest charting single during Bolan's lifetime.
