= Nevězice =

- Municipality
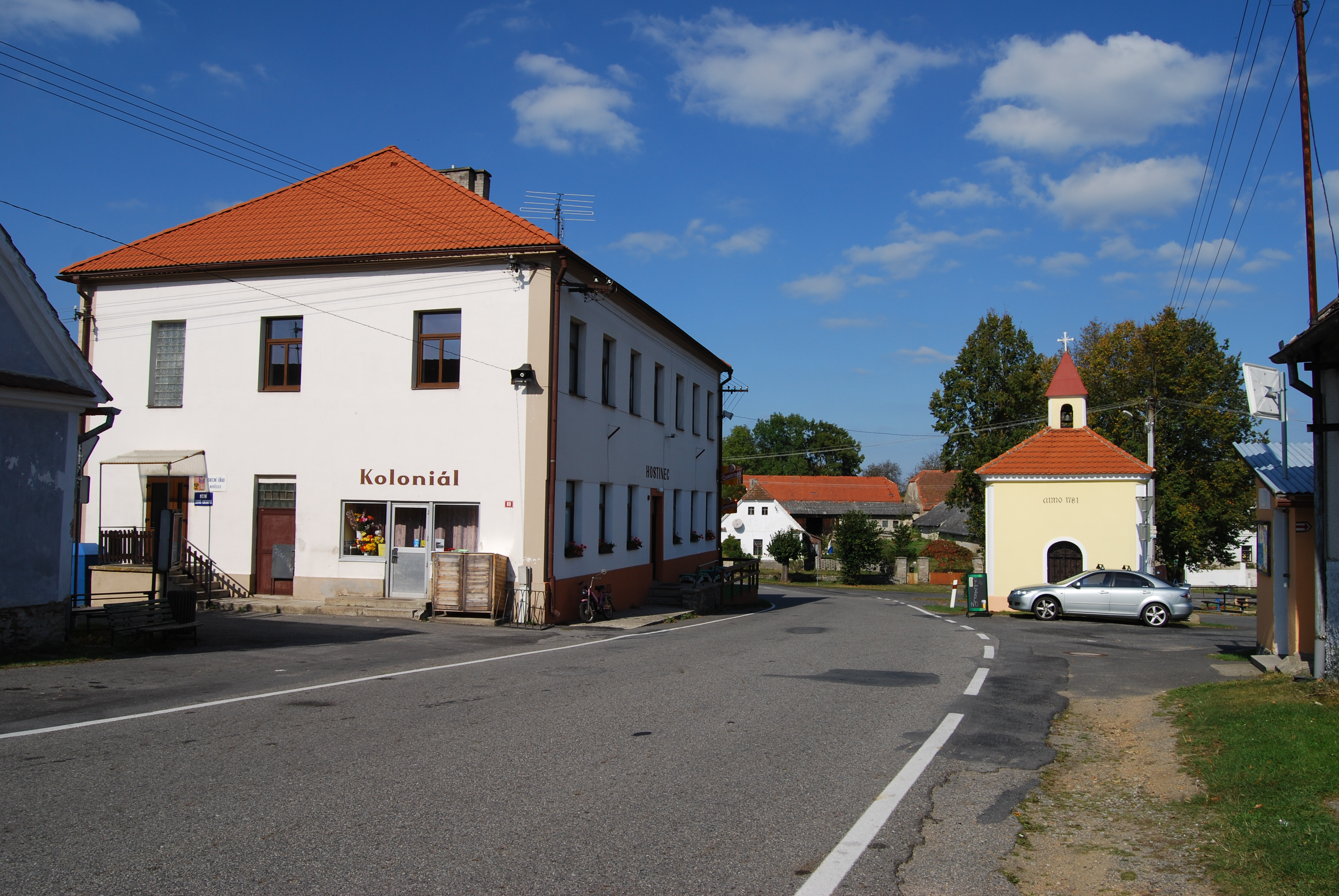
- Centre of Nevězice

- Flag Coat of arms

- Location in the Czech Republic
- Coordinates: 49°28′40″N 14°9′12″E
- Country: Czech Republic
- Region: South Bohemian
- District: Písek
- First mentioned: 1499

Area
  - Total: 9.86 km^{2} (3.81 sq mi)
- Elevation: 439 m (1,440 ft)

Population (2026-01-01)
  - Total: 128
  - Density: 13.0/km^{2} (33.6/sq mi)
- Time zone: UTC+1 (CET)
  - Summer (DST): UTC+2 (CEST)
- Postal code: 398 07
- Website: www.nevezice.cz

Nevězice is a municipality and village in Písek District in the South Bohemian Region of the Czech Republic. It has about 100 inhabitants.

Nevězice lies approximately 20 kilometres (12 mi) north of Písek, 61 km (38 mi) north-west of České Budějovice, and 71 km (44 mi) south of Prague.

== Demographics ==
Historical population
Year	Pop.	±%
1869	692	—
1880	735	+6.2%
1890	713	−3.0%
1900	615	−13.7%
1910	574	−6.7%
1921	492	−14.3%
1930	459	−6.7%
1950	325	−29.2%
1961	352	+8.3%
1970	322	−8.5%
1980	247	−23.3%
1991	160	−35.2%
2001	149	−6.9%
2011	140	−6.0%
2021	136	−2.9%
Source: Censuses
