= Jack Green (musician) =

Scottish musician and songwriter (1951–2024)

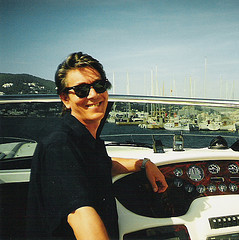

Background information
- Born: 12 March 1951; Glasgow, Scotland
- Died: 18 April 2024 (aged 73)
- Occupations: Singer; songwriter; musician
- Instruments: Vocals; guitar; bass guitar
- Years active: 1970s–2024
- Formerly of: T. Rex; Pretty Things; Rainbow; Mickey Finn's T. Rex

Jack Green (12 March 1951 – 18 April 2024) was a Scottish musician and songwriter.

== Biography ==
Green played with T. Rex between 1973 and 1974, then with Pretty Things between 1974 and 1976, recording Silk Torpedo and Savage Eye. After Phil May walked out on the Pretty Things he carried on with Peter Tolson, Gordon Edwards and Skip Alan in Metropolis. He also was a member of Rainbow for three weeks in late 1978.

In 1980, he launched a solo career with the album Humanesque. This included the single "This is Japan" which peaked at number 35 in Australia. The album generated multiple hits, particularly "Babe", in the Canadian province of Alberta, but not the rest of the country: "You couldn't find his record with a search warrant outside of Alberta. It was a strange regional phenomenon and it doesn't happen that often," according to a radio host.

This was followed by Reverse Logic in 1981, Mystique in 1983 and Latest Game in 1986.

Green joined with fellow former T. Rex members Mickey Finn and Paul Fenton in Mickey Finn's T-Rex (1997–1999).

Green later lived in Ryde, Isle of Wight, where he taught guitar, and owned a budget film production company.

A new album The Party at the End of the World was released in 2020. He died of cancer on 18 April 2024, at the age of 73.

== Solo albums ==
- (1980) Humanesque
- (1981) Reverse Logic
- (1983) Mystique
- (1986) Latest Game
- (2020) The Party at the End of the World
