= Larry Zhixing Hu =

Larry Zhixing Hu was awarded minor planet name 18739 Larryhu during the 2003 Intel International Science and Engineering Fair in Cleveland, Ohio for his grand award-winning computer science team project named "A Liquid-based Thermoelectric Application for Processor Architecture Scalability". The year prior, Larry was a member of the first team to be sent to ISEF from the state of Alabama.

Hu was awarded third place in the 2003 Intel International Science and Engineering Fair for his computer science team project. He attended the UMS Wright Preparatory School, Mobile, Alabama, U.S.A.

He graduated from the University of Washington with his Computer Information Science capstone entitled "An Explorative Study in Scalable Information Technology Applications" that contemplated the growth of computing power with respect to Moore's Law and Ray Kurzweil's Law of Accelerating Returns .

He currently lives in Seattle, Washington, works at Microsoft in the Office 365 team as a Systems and DevOps Engineer.

== Notes ==
- ^1 Larryhu Discovered 1998 Sept. 26 by MIT Lincoln Laboratory's Near-Earth Asteroid Research program.
