= Mickey Finn's T-Rex =

Tribute band to T. Rex consisting of former members

- Also known as: T-Rex; T. Rex Band; T-Rex (A Celebration of Marc and Mickey)
- Origin: Surrey, England
- Genres: Glam rock; hard rock
- Years active: 1997–present
- Label: Angel Air
- Spinoff of: T. Rex
- Members: Paul Fenton; Tony Allday; Dave Major; Linda Dawson; Graham Oliver; Jay Spargo
- Past members: Mickey Finn; Jack Green; Rob Benson; Alan Silson; Teri Sullivan
- Website: t-rex.co.uk

Mickey Finn's T-Rex are a band formed in 1997 by former T. Rex members Mickey Finn, Jack Green, and drummer Paul Fenton. Following Finn's 2003 death, the band toured regularly through early 2013. Since then, they have only publicly performed three times, all for special events. They have also done at least one private show.

== History ==
=== Formation ===
In September 1997, former T. Rex members Mickey Finn, Jack Green, and drummer Paul Fenton were invited by Mick Gray (a.k.a. Marmalade), former T. Rex tour manager, to The Marc Bolan Anniversary Concert to celebrate Marc's 50th birthday, taking place at the Cambridge Corn Exchange, where Gray was manager. Prior to this, Gray had taken former road manager Mick O'Halloran to visit Mickey Finn at his home (Gray and Finn had remained good friends through the years) to persuade him to attend the Cambridge bash. This idea was Gray's brainchild to celebrate Bolan's 50th birthday. Other artists appearing included John's Children and Rolan Bolan with T.Rextasy being the house band and headlining the event. Drummer Bill Legend was invited to appear, but did not appear on the night due to ongoing personal problems. Finn, Fenton, and Green were overwhelmed with the support at that gig, so they decided to form Mickey Finn's T. Rex. The line-up was Finn (congas), Fenton (drums), Green (guitar and vocals), Dave Major (keyboards), and Tony Allday (bass guitar). One year later, Rob Benson, a lifelong fan of T. Rex, went to see the reformed band in Northampton's Chicago Rock cafe. He met the band afterward and was asked to send an audition tape after claiming to be able to sing like Marc Bolan. The band's manager Barry Newby decided that the voice was essential to the T. Rex sound and, after hearing Rob's tape, invited him to a further audition; soon he was asked to be lead vocalist. The band renamed themselves Mickey Finn's T-Rex, and acquired the legal trademark rights for the "T-Rex" bandname. In 1999, guitarist Jack Green (who had played in T.Rex in 1973-1974) left and was replaced by founding member of Smokie Alan Silson. Danielz, lead guitarist and vocalist for T.Rextasy was asked by Paul Fenton to front the band, but he refused and decided to remain in T.Rextasy.

=== Early touring and albums ===
With a more complete sound, the band started a tour of Germany in 1999. Shortly afterwards they embarked on a full-scale tour of Japan. In 2002, the band released an album called Renaissance and a live DVD titled Back In Business. In January 2008 the band released Classic Hits on Spectra Records, who they had recently signed with.

=== Finn's death ===
Mickey Finn died in January 2003. The future of the band became unsure, but they decided to continue without him, believing it to be Mickey's wish. The band changed their name to T. Rex (A Celebration of Marc and Mickey). In July 2008, the band reverted to Mickey Finn's T-Rex, with the blessing from Mickey's family for using his name. They also replaced Silson with Graham Oliver.

== Recent events ==
The band continues to tour Europe, with a much heavier sound than T. Rex had originally. They play classic T. Rex songs from the 1970s. The only member now in the group that had any connection to T. Rex is drummer Paul Fenton. Teri Sullivan joined the band on 1 August as a background vocalist.

In 2008, a petition of around 1000 signatures signed by David Bowie, Roy Wood, Tony Visconti, and Bill Legend called for Paul Fenton to change the band's name to something other than "T. Rex (A Celebration of Marc and Mickey)" in order to make it clear that it was a tribute act, not the actual T. Rex. It has been wrongly claimed by a redundant hoax website that Bill toured Australia and Germany with a band using the name Bill Legend's T-Rex.

Rob Benson left the band in January 2010. Jay Spargo became lead singer in May 2010.

== Band members ==
Bold names indicate those who performed with T. Rex with Marc Bolan.

Current members

- **Paul Fenton** – drums (1997–present)
- Tony Allday – bass guitar (1997–present)
- Dave Major – keyboards, vocals (1997–present)
- Linda Dawson – backing vocals (2002–present)
- Graham Oliver – guitars (2003–present)
- Jay Spargo – lead vocals (2010–present)

Former members

- **Mickey Finn** – bongos, congas, drums, vocals (1997–2003; his death)
- **Jack Green** – guitars, lead vocals (1997–1999; died 2024)
- Rob Benson – lead vocals (1998–2010)
- Alan Silson – guitars (1999–2003)

Timeline

== Discography ==
- Renaissance (2002)
- A Celebration of Marc and Mickey - Classic Hits (2008)
