= Paul Fenton (musician) =

English drummer

- Born: 4 July 1946 (age 80); Huddersfield, Yorkshire, England
- Genres: Rock; pop rock; blues rock
- Occupation: Drummer
- Years active: 1967–present
- Website: www.t-rex.co.uk

Paul Fenton (born 4 July 1946 in Huddersfield, Yorkshire, England) is an English drummer, best known for his work with T. Rex. After leaving Christie, he started playing drums for T. Rex in 1973, after being recommended to Marc Bolan by his producer Tony Visconti.

Fenton also played in Carmen, a progressive rock band with a flamenco focus. The band released three albums between 1973 and 1975.

Fenton along with Mickey Finn, formed a T. Rex tribute band in 1997, named Mickey Finn's T-Rex.

== Discography ==
=== With Christie ===
- 1971 – For All Mankind
- 2012 – No Turn Unstoned

=== With Carmen ===
- 1973 – Fandangos in Space
- 1975 – Dancing on a Cold Wind
- 1976 – Gypsies

=== With T. Rex ===
- 1974 – Additional drums on the song "Solid Baby", which featured on the albums Light of Love and Bolan's Zip Gun

=== With Mickey Finn's T-Rex ===
- 2002 – Renaissance
- 2008 – Back in Business
- 2009 – Classic Hits
