= Jean-Pierre Lebreton =

French scientist (born 1949)

- Born: 21 August 1949 (age 77); Thimert-Gâtelles, France
- Education: University of Orléans
- Scientific career
- Fields: Planetary science
- Workplaces: ESA

Jean-Pierre Lebreton (born 21 August 1949) is a French planetary scientist at ESA, who specialized in plasma physics. He was the mission manager of the Huygens probe that landed on Saturn's moon Titan in 2005. Besides the Huygens mission, Lebreton is also working with the Rosetta comet probe and its Plasma Consortium Experiment, and the Venus Express space probe.

Lebreton was born on 21 August 1949 in Thimert-Gâtelles.
