= François d'Amboise =

French jurist and writer

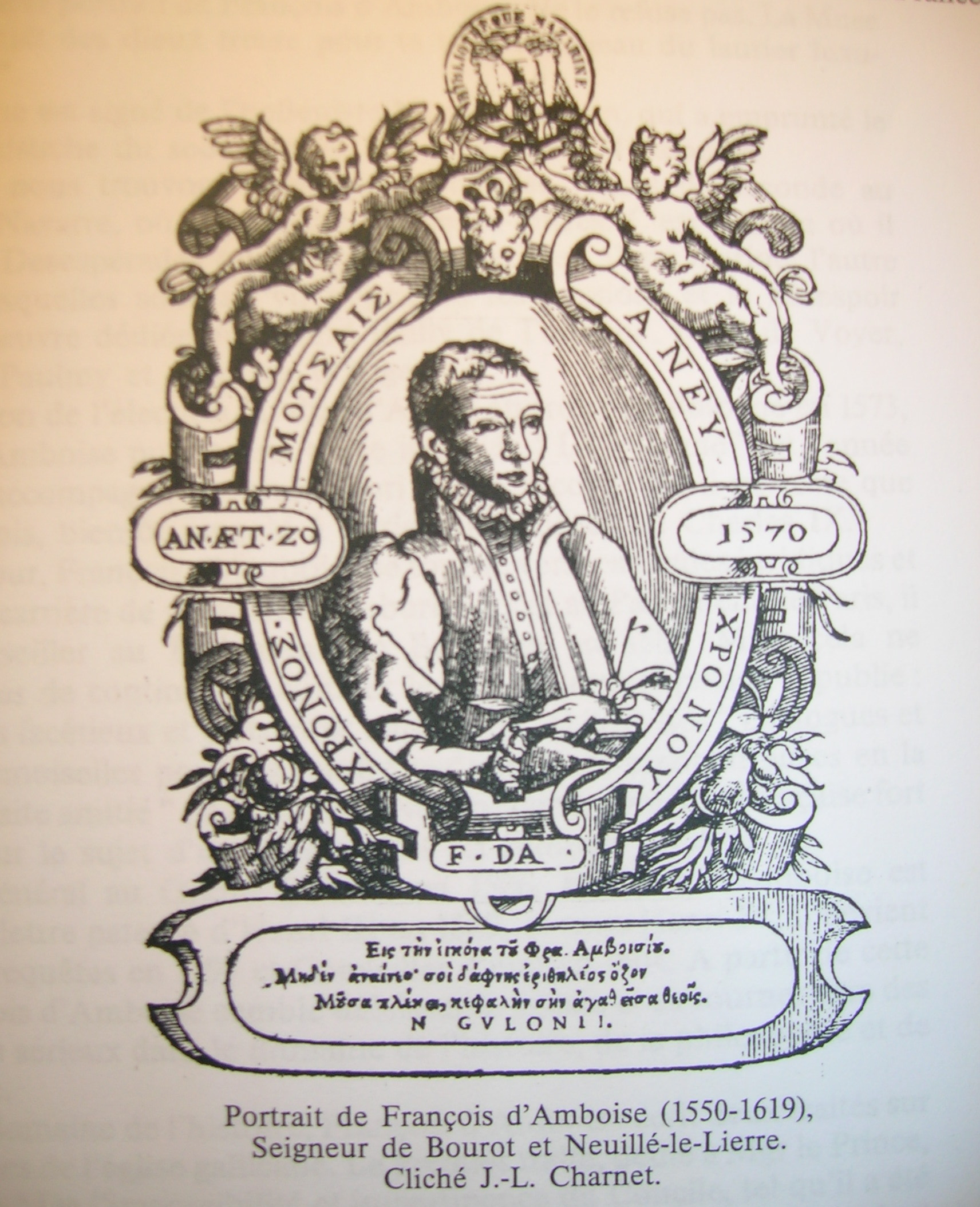
Portrait of François d'Amboise

François d'Amboise (1550 – 1619) was a French jurist and writer. He was counsellor to the Parlement of Brittany and advocate general to the Grand Conseil.

== Biography ==
François d'Amboise was born in Paris, the son of Jean d'Amboise, ordinary surgeon of the king, and the brother of Adrien d'Amboise, Bishop of Tréguier, and of Jacques d'Amboise (rector of the University of Paris). He studied rhetoric and philosophy at the College of Navarre (Paris); in 1568, he became regent to the second grade there and taught literature and philosophy.

In 1581, he became the king's lawyer in the treasury, and in 1586, advocate general to the Grand Conseil. In 1589, Henri III granted him letters of nobility. In 1596, Henry IV named him maître des requêtes, and then, in 1604, Conseiller d'État. François d'Amboise became seigneur of Vezeul, Bourot, Neuillé-le Lierre, Brouard, Lespinière, La Huardière in Touraine of Houvoy, Malnoue, Courserin, Plessis-Bourré, Hémery, and Baron of La Chartre-sur-le-Loir.

He died in Paris in 1619 and was buried in the Church of Saint-Paul-Saint-Louis.

His son was Antoine d'Amboise, seigneur of Clos Lucé, colonel of the regiment of Amboise, maréchal de camp, and governor of the citadel of Trin (Piedmont).

== Works ==
François d'Amboise wrote a comedy in verse entitled the Néapolitaines (1584) and several works of poetry, including an elegy on the death of Anne de Montmorency, Élégie sur le trépas d'Anne de Montmorency (1568). He was also responsible for an edition of the works of Peter Abelard (1616).

- Regrets facétieux et plaisantes harengues funèbres sur la mort de divers animaux pour passer le temps et resveiller les esprits mélencoliques, non moins remplis d'éloquence que d'utilité et gaillardise, Paris, N. Bonfons, 1583.
- The Néapolitaines, comedy (1584)
