= Mickey Finn (percussionist) =

British percussionist (1947–2003)

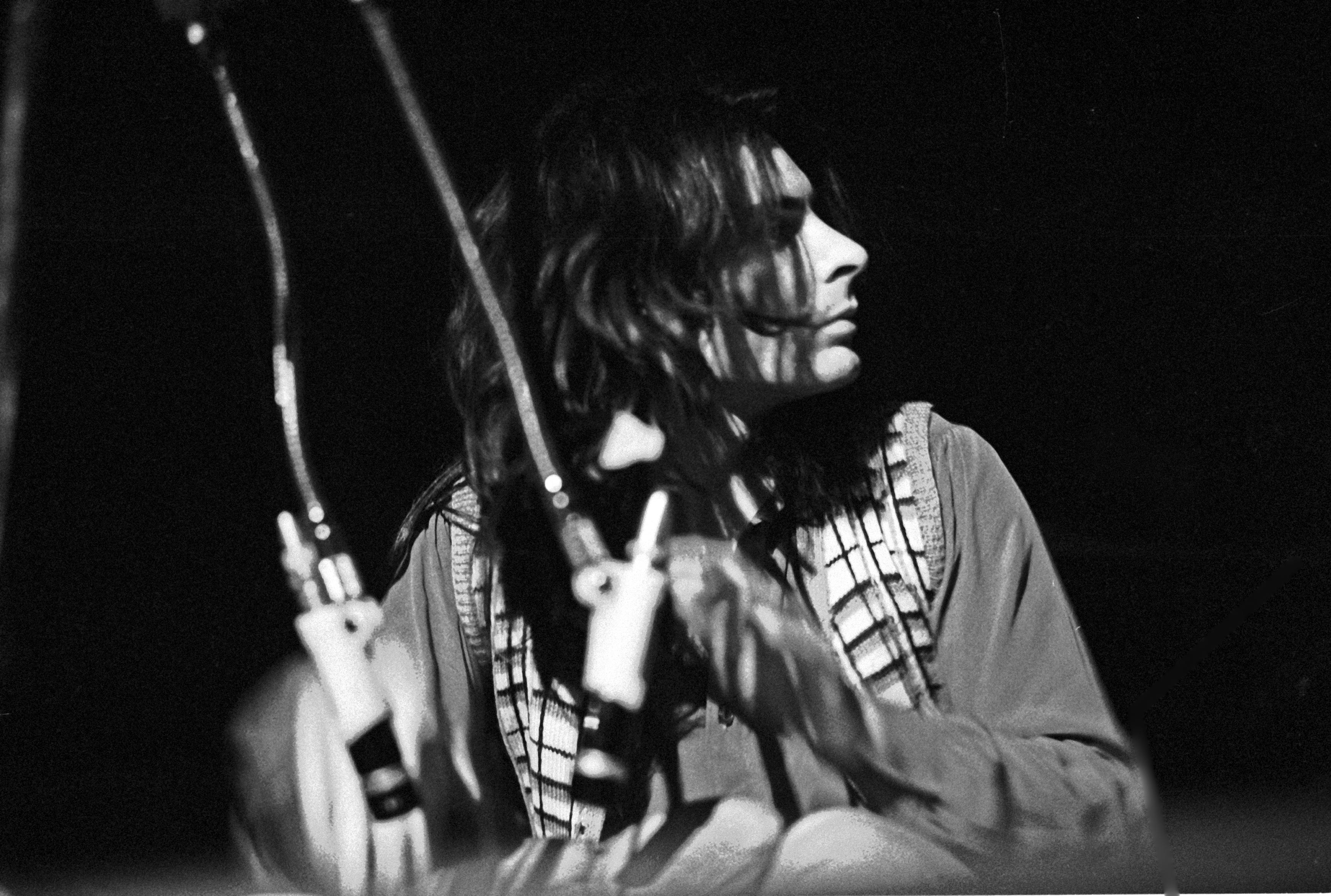
- Finn performing with T. Rex in the Musikhalle Hamburg, January 1972

Background information
- Born: Michael Norman Finn; 3 June 1947; Thornton Heath, Surrey, England
- Died: 11 January 2003 (aged 55) Croydon, Surrey, England
- Genres: Psychedelic folk, glam rock
- Occupations: Musician
- Instruments: Percussion; drums; bass; vocals
- Years active: 1969–2003
- Labels: Fly Records/Reprise, EMI, Casablanca, Demon Music Group, Track
- Formerly of: T. Rex; Hapshash and the Coloured Coat; Mickey Finn's T. Rex; The Blow Monkeys; The Soup Dragons

Michael Norman Finn (3 June 1947 – 11 January 2003) was an English musician. He was best known as the percussionist and sideman to Marc Bolan in his band Tyrannosaurus Rex (on one album, A Beard of Stars) and later the 1970s glam rock group T. Rex. After Bolan's death and T. Rex's demise, he worked as a session musician for The Blow Monkeys and The Soup Dragons.

== Career ==
Finn was born in Thornton Heath, Surrey. After he joined Tyrannosaurus Rex in late 1969, it was rumoured that Bolan had hired Finn for his good looks, and because he admired his motorcycle, rather than for his musical ability. Finn was unable to recreate the complex rhythmical patterns of his predecessor, Steve Peregrin Took, and was effectively hired as much for a visual foil for Bolan as for his drumming. The BBC news commented on this, saying "Marc Bolan was supposed to have said of Finn: 'He can't sing... but he looks superb.'"

Mickey Finn stated, on a radio show in Denmark on which he and Marc Bolan were appearing as guest DJs, that his big influence in percussion was the prolific Master Henry Gibson from Curtis Mayfield's band. In 1969–1971, Finn's contribution to Bolan's music, as bongocero, backing vocalist and occasional bass guitarist, was essential, because T. Rex started off as Tyrannosaurus Rex, a duo and Marc needed a replacement for Took. Something of a character both on and off stage, Finn was often to be seen wearing a hat (including a green bowler), a trademark that was adopted by a significant proportion of T. Rex fans.

During the late 1980s and early 1990s, Finn made a handful of guest appearances with the West London rock band, Checkpoint Charlie, fronted by Mick Lexington.

In 1991, he joined the Croydon R&B band, WD40, which had a fluid line-up based around his old friend, drummer Stewart Childs, Colin Goody (harp, vocals), and Pete Robins (guitar, vocals). The band then added guitarists, percussionists, etc. as required, but Finn was forced to retire after about 12 months due to failing health. A couple of live tracks survive from this line up. Finn was also invited to play at the Marc Bolan 50th Anniversary gig organised by Mick Gray (ex-T. Rex tour manager and roadie), to celebrate what would have been Bolan's 50th birthday at the Cambridge Corn Exchange on 30 September 1997.

Finn returned to the mainstream music scene in 1997, fronting Mickey Finn's T. Rex with Paul Fenton and Jack Green, playing old T. Rex songs until his death. He played on one live album by the band, Renaissance (2002).

== Death ==
Finn died in Croydon, Surrey, on 11 January 2003, aged 55. His manager, Barry Newby commented that it was likely that Finn's illness and death were due to liver and kidney problems but it was not confirmed at the time of the interview. In 2020, Finn was posthumously inducted into the Rock and Roll Hall of Fame as a member of T. Rex with Bolan, Steve Currie and Bill Legend.
