= The Soul of My Suit =

1977 song by T. Rex

Single by T. Rex

from the album Dandy in the Underworld
- B-side: "All Alone"
- Released: 18 March 1977
- Genre: Glam rock
- Length: 2:36
- Label: EMI
- Songwriter(s): Marc Bolan
- Producer(s): Marc Bolan

T. Rex singles chronology
"Laser Love" (1976)	"The Soul of My Suit" (1977)	"Dandy in the Underworld" (1977)

"The Soul of My Suit" is a song by English rock band T. Rex, which was released in 1977 as the second single from their twelfth and final studio album Dandy in the Underworld. The song was written and produced by Marc Bolan. "The Soul of My Suit" reached number 42 in the UK Singles Chart and remained in the top 50 for three weeks.

== Writing and recording ==
"The Soul of My Suit" is believed to have been influenced by Bolan's first wife June, whom he separated from in 1973. In a 1975 interview on Capital Radio, Bolan described "The Soul of My Suit" as having been written about "a woman who had bruised my ego". According to Gloria Jones, the song was not only influenced by Bolan's imminent divorce from June, but was also a way of him telling the public "If you don't support me, I understand". She added, "He felt that the industry had damaged his soul because they were against his music." Originally titled "You Damaged the Soul of My Suit", T. Rex first recorded the song in the spring of 1975 at Musicland Studios in Munich.

== Release ==
"The Soul of My Suit" was T. Rex's last single to enter the UK Singles Chart prior to Bolan's death in September 1977. To promote the single, the band performed the song on Top of the Pops (broadcast 24 March), Supersonic (broadcast 2 April) and Get It Together (broadcast 27 April).

== Music video ==
A music video was shot to promote the single, but was never shown at the time. The video was filmed in the Hall of Mirrors at Belle Vue in Manchester on 12 March 1977 and was Bolan's final promotional video before his death. The video surfaced from EMI's archives in 1999 and later received an upload to the band's official YouTube channel in 2020.

== Critical reception ==
Upon its release, Jim Evans of Record Mirror gave the song a three out of five rating and wrote, "Marc rides a white swan back to the old days. Voice sounds wobbly. Hit." The Lincoln, Rutland & Stamford Mercury commented, "Familiar bits of former hits. Bolan treats us to strangled outbursts to remind us of what he once was." Mike Pryce of the Worcester Evening News stated, "The punk rockers of yesteryear having moved on to something marginally more melodic." Charles Shaar Murray of the NME was negative in his review, stating that there are a "couple of halfway decent ideas which unfortunately have nothing much to do with each other and therefore don't even clash in an interesting manner". He continued, "More primeval than primal, drivel burbled fairly engagingly, though he sounds as though he's having trouble singing while keeping his cheeks sucked in."

In a review of Dandy in the Underworld, Phil McNeill of the NME noted that the song "shows Marc's voice is as good as ever – and his guitar playing, while missing the strangulated sparkle of yore, is more assured than ever". In a retrospective review of the album, Dave Thompson, writing for AllMusic, described "The Soul of My Suit" as "yearning" and felt it was the "most successful" track to retain the "demented soul revue edge" of Bolan's past work.

== Track listing ==
7-inch single (UK, France and Australia)

1. "The Soul of My Suit" – 2:36
2. "All Alone" – 2:48

7-inch single (Germany)

1. "The Soul of My Suit" – 2:36
2. "Crimson Moon" – 3:15

7-inch promotional single (Japan)

1. "The Soul of My Suit" – 2:36
2. "All Alone" – 2:48

== Personnel ==
Credits are adapted from the Dandy in the Underworld LP album liner notes.

"The Soul of My Suit"

- Marc Bolan – vocals, guitar
- Dino Dines – keyboards
- Herbie Flowers – bass
- Tony Newman – drums
- Alfalpha – additional vocals

Production

- Marc Bolan – producer
- Mike Stavrou, Jon Walls – engineers

== Charts ==
Chart (1977)	Peak position
UK Singles (OCC)	42
