= Dandy in the Underworld (song) =

1977 song by T. Rex

Single by T. Rex

from the album Dandy in the Underworld
- B-side: "Groove a Little"; "Tame My Tiger"
- Released: 27 May 1977
- Genre: Glam rock
- Length: 4:33 (album version); 3:53 (single version)
- Label: EMI
- Songwriter: Marc Bolan
- Producer: Marc Bolan

T. Rex singles chronology
"The Soul of My Suit" (1977)	"Dandy in the Underworld" (1977)	"Celebrate Summer" (1977)

"Dandy in the Underworld" is a song by English rock band T. Rex, released by EMI on 27 May 1977 as the third single from their twelfth and final studio album Dandy in the Underworld. The song was written and produced by Marc Bolan.

== Writing ==
"Dandy in the Underworld" was written in early November 1976 as the recording sessions for the Dandy in the Underworld album were drawing to a close. Bolan has described the song as a "Bolonic revision of Orpheus descending". He told Record Mirror in 1977, "'Dandy in the Underworld' is a retelling of the old story where Orpheus goes into the underworld and then returns to the light. That's been true of my life sometimes." The song was also inspired by The Picture of Dorian Gray, with Bolan revealing to Ian Ravendale in 1977, "It's a very sad song, actually. A young man goes through the social world and doesn't come out very good. It's about someone who was very flash and burned the candle at both ends."

== Recording ==
The song was recorded at AIR Studios in November 1976. It features Steve Harley (of Steve Harley & Cockney Rebel) providing vocal harmonies as well as the chorus backing vocals. Bolan met Harley in 1975 and the pair became close friends until Bolan's death in 1977. Recalling the recording session for the song, Harley told Record Collector in 2020, "The sessions were hardly a model of sobriety but being with him was a joy."

Harley first heard the finished recording on 1 February 1977 when Bolan played him a tape of the track at Harley's flat in London. Bolan recorded in his diary that Harley "loved it". When Harley was recording his debut solo album Hobo with a Grin in 1977, Bolan returned the favour by playing guitar on two tracks, "Amerika the Brave" and "Someone's Coming".

== Release ==
"Dandy in the Underworld" was released by EMI Records as a single from Dandy in the Underworld on 27 May 1977, over two months after the release of the album. The two B-sides, "Groove a Little" and "Tame My Tiger", were also written and produced by Bolan. Bolan described the latter track as a "New wave song". The first 25,000 copies of the single were to be issued with a picture sleeve.

After the preceding single "The Soul of My Suit" stalled at number 42 in the UK Singles Chart, Bolan returned to AIR Studios in April 1977 to remix and partially re-record "Dandy in the Underworld" for its upcoming release as a single. The new version featured new lead vocals and some additional guitar and strings to the backing track. The fourth verse was removed (a repeat of the first verse), thereby reducing the song's duration by over half a minute. To improve its suitability for radio play, the line "Exalted companion of cocaine nights" was changed to "T. Rex nights".

The song failed to garner significant airplay on BBC Radio when it was released. Writing for Record Mirror, Bolan commented in 1977, "The Beeb were not over anxious to play my last single and there was me thinking I had been clever by omitting the offending reference to cocaine on the album cut. But someone told me one of their judges had said 'We've been very good to Marc – we always play one in four of his singles'. Such are the mysteries of rock." The song did, however, generate some play on Independent Local Radio stations including Pennine Radio, Radio Hallam and Radio Trent. "Dandy in the Underworld" was the first T. Rex single to fail to enter the UK Singles Chart since 1970's "By the Light of a Magical Moon".

== Promotion ==
To promote the single, T. Rex appeared on Get It Together to perform the song. It was filmed in the TV studio on 22 June and broadcast on 29 June. The band also performed the song on Bolan's British TV series Marc. The episode featuring the performance was broadcast on 14 September 1977 and was the final one before Bolan's death. Steve Harley had agreed to appear on an episode of the show, but Bolan died before Harley was available. Bolan intended to perform "Dandy in the Underworld" with T. Rex and Harley, as well as an acoustic version of Steve Harley & Cockney Rebel's "Make Me Smile (Come Up and See Me)" with Harley.

== Critical reception ==
On its release, Rosalind Russell of Record Mirror predicted "Dandy in the Underworld" would be a hit and wrote, "Three track throttle from an elf turned punk. I love it and especially because he's got the nerve to go out again on a new wave and not hang onto old images like a lot of other people." Charles Shaar Murray of the NME felt the song was "the kind of over-solemn dog-spittle that Marc gets into when he feels important". He added that the single's two B-sides were "unpretentious little rock pieces that ride around the turntable more than happily". Mike Pryce of the Worcester Evening News stated, "Marc B. quietly goes on having the hits, so his fans are showing remarkable staying power. This however I see as one of his biggest for some time. Set to a raunchy old rock ballad beat, it's Bolan with all the stops out."

In a retrospective review of the song, Dave Thompson, writing for AllMusic, considered it to be "a genuine Bolan classic". As "one of Bolan's most honestly autobiographical songs in years", Thompson noted the "candid synopsis of his own decline" in the lyrics. He felt the song on the whole was proof that "just as the mid- to late-'70s punk movement took much of its impetus from Bolan's own early example, Bolan was himself rejuvenating around its energies." Mark Paytress, in his 2002 book Bolan: The Rise and Fall of a 20th Century Superstar, praised it as "pure Bolan melodrama at its best". He noted the return of Bolan's "favourite C-Am-F-G chord sequence, majestically restated despite the cheesy, pomp rock synth" and how the lyrics saw him "revisiting Greek mythology". Paytress also drew comparisons to Bolan and T. Rex's 1974 single "Teenage Dream" as Bolan "survey[s] the debris of his fractured career – only this time, with lessons learned, he was on his way back up not down".

In a 2020 retrospective on the top 10 T. Rex songs, Brian Kachejian of Classic Rock History picked "Dandy in the Underworld" as number five on the list. He considered the song to be "pure T. Rex excitement" and added that it "seemed to be a preview for the next musical chapter of Bolan's life until he was tragically killed".

== Track listing ==
7-inch single (UK)

1. "Dandy in the Underworld" – 3:53
2. "Groove a Little" – 3:27
3. "Tame My Tiger" – 2:32

7-inch single (Japan)

1. "Dandy in the Underworld" – 3:53
2. "Tame My Tiger" – 2:32

== Personnel ==
Credits are adapted from the Dandy in the Underworld LP album liner notes.

"Dandy in the Underworld"

- Marc Bolan – vocals, guitar
- Dino Dines – keyboards, synthesizer
- Herbie Flowers – bass
- Tony Newman – drums
- Steve Harley – backing vocals

Production

- Marc Bolan – producer
- Mike Stavrou, Jon Walls – engineers
