= Marc Bolan's Rock Shrine =

Memorial in Barnes, London

Coordinates: 51.4659032°N 0.2386107°W

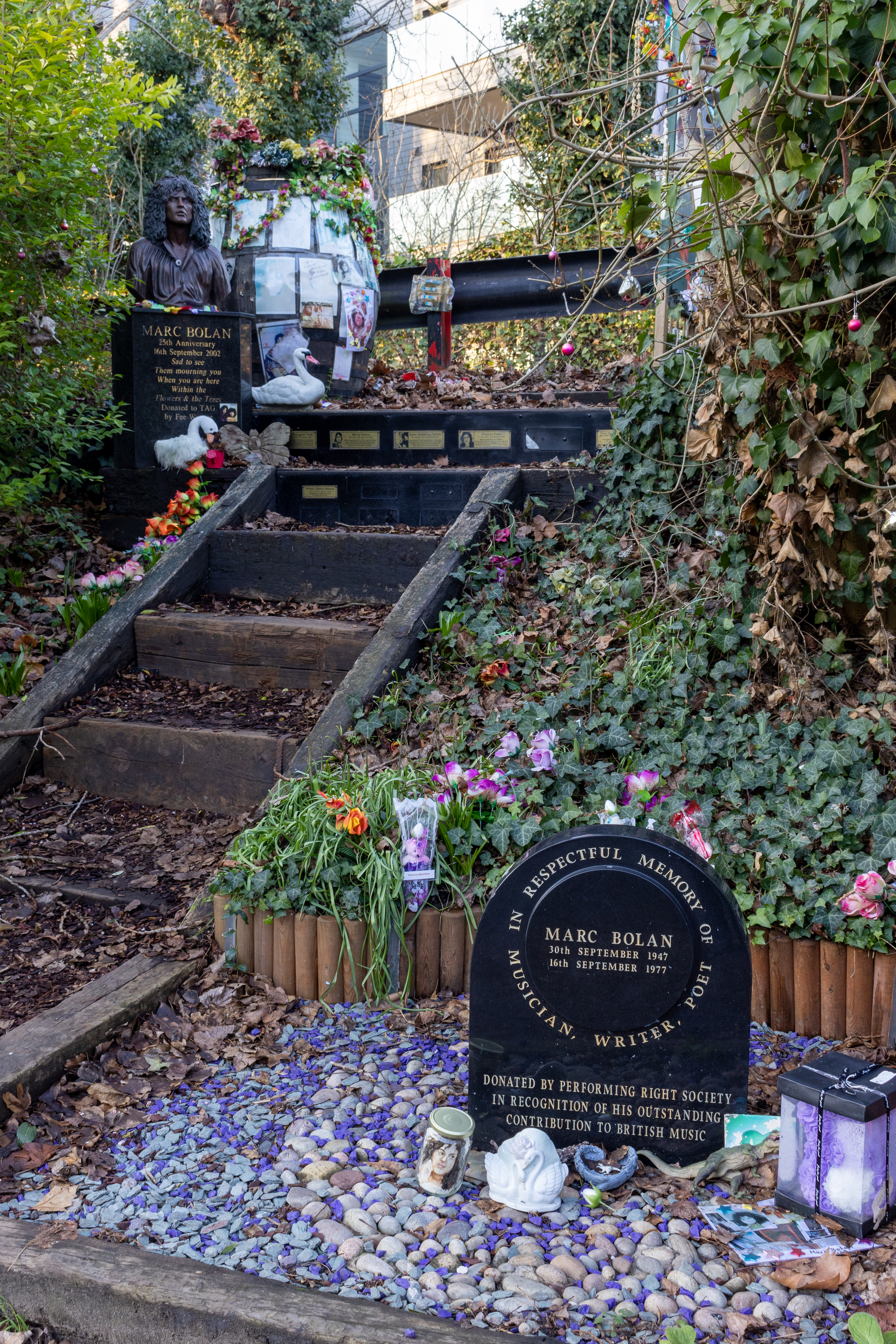
Marc Bolan's Rock Shrine showing the 1997 memorial, and the 2002 bust at the top of the steps

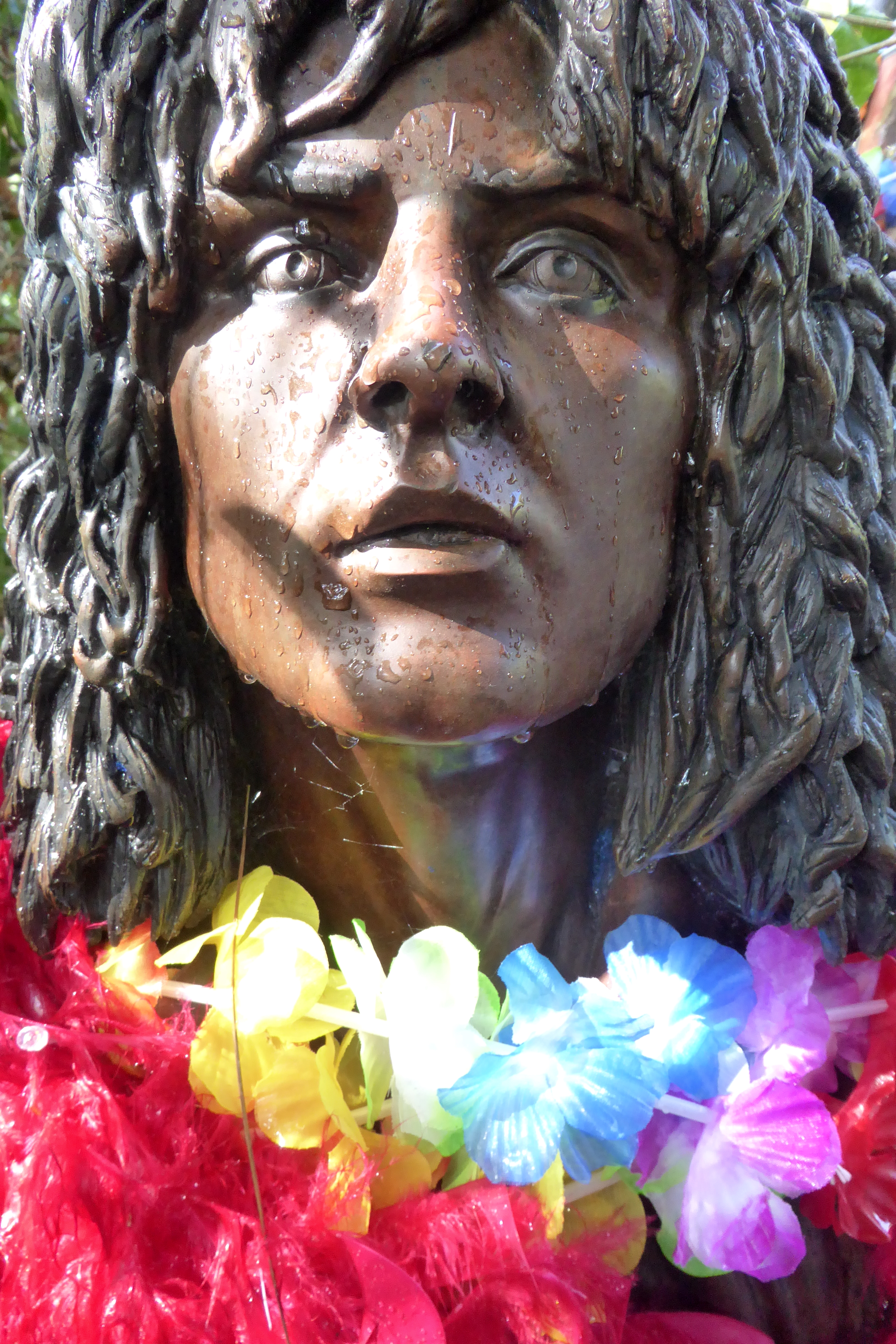
Facial detail of the bust

Marc Bolan's Rock Shrine is a memorial to glam-rock musician Marc Bolan, from the band T. Rex. It is located on the site where he died in a car crash in Barnes, London, on 16 September 1977. Bolan was a passenger in a car that hit a part-metal-and-wood fence and then a sycamore tree on Queen's Ride (part of the B306, close to Gipsy Lane), and he was pronounced dead at the scene on the arrival of paramedics at the woods. A memorial stone was unveiled at the site in 1997, and a bust of Bolan was added in 2002.

== Origins ==
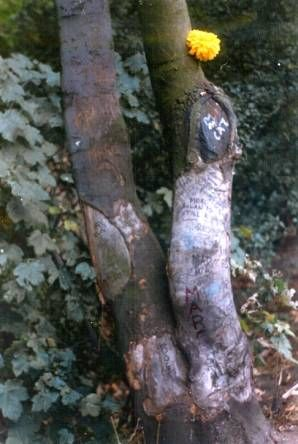
The Bolan Tree in June 1978

Marc Bolan died, aged 29, after being found unconscious as a passenger in the wreckage of his purple Mini driven by his girlfriend Gloria Jones. He was not wearing a seat belt at the time of the crash. Jones lost control of the car, which then struck a steel-reinforced chain link fence post and came to rest against a sycamore tree, after failing to navigate a small humpback bridge, near Gipsy Lane on Queens Ride, Barnes in south-west London. Bolan was a passenger in the car and was pronounced dead at the scene upon the arrival of paramedics. Jones was wearing a seat belt and was conscious after the crash, but was critically injured and spent some time in hospital. From the day of the accident, the site became a place of pilgrimage to Bolan’s fans and this was reported in various newspapers from 1978 onwards. Coincidentally, the registration number of the car was FOX 661L and within the lyrics of his single "Solid Gold Easy Action" are the lines "Easy as picking foxes from a tree" and "Woman from the east with her headlights shining".

In September 1997, on the 20th anniversary of Bolan's death, the Performing Right Society (PRS) installed a memorial stone for Bolan, facing into Gipsy Lane at the base of the embankment from the "Bolan Tree" located in Queen's Ride. In 1999, the T-Rex Action Group (TAG) was formed with the specific aim of caring for the site. TAG were granted an in perpetuity lease on the site with ownership and full responsibility for the "Bolan Tree". During 2000, TAG built steps up the embankment between the "Bolan Tree" on Queen's Ride and the PRS memorial stone facing Gipsy Lane and took action needed to make the tree safe so that the threat of it falling was removed.

In 2002 a bronze bust of Bolan, paid for exclusively by T-Rex Action Group founder Fee Warner and sculpted by Canadian sculptor Jean Robillard, was unveiled by Bolan's only child Rolan Bolan.

In 2005, memorial plaques were fitted to the steps to remember other deceased members of T. Rex: Steve Peregrin Took, Steve Currie, Mickey Finn and Dino Dines. A memorial plaque was also included for Marc Bolan's wife June Bolan (née Child) as recognition for her contribution to his success.

== Official recognition ==
In February 2007, the 30th anniversary year of Marc Bolan's death, the work undertaken by the T-Rex Action Group since 1999 was recognised by the English Tourist Board's publication of its new guide England Rocks which features 113 "Sites of Rock 'n' Roll Importance" in England. In London, 29 sites are listed, but many are "general sites" such as Abbey Road and Wembley Stadium which are not "person-specific". Only Marc Bolan, Jimi Hendrix and Freddie Mercury are listed in the guide in their own right.

== See also ==
- List of public art in Richmond upon Thames
