= Celebrate Summer =

1977 song by T. Rex

Single by T. Rex
- B-side: "Ride My Wheels"
- Released: 12 August 1977
- Genre: Glam rock
- Length: 2:38
- Label: EMI
- Songwriter(s): Marc Bolan
- Producer(s): Marc Bolan

T. Rex singles chronology
"Dandy in the Underworld" (1977)	"Celebrate Summer" (1977)	"Crimson Moon / Jason B Sad" (1978)

"Celebrate Summer" is a song by English rock band T. Rex, which was released in 1977 as a non-album single. The song was written and produced by Marc Bolan. "Celebrate Summer" was the last T. Rex release before Bolan's death in a car crash on 16 September 1977.

== Recording ==
"Celebrate Summer" was recorded at AIR Studios in April 1977. After the release of T. Rex's twelfth studio album Dandy in the Underworld in March 1977, Bolan spent April recording in Decibel Studios then AIR Studios. From the sessions at AIR Studios, he remixed and partially re-recorded the title track for its upcoming release as a single and recorded "Celebrate Summer" with T. Rex bandmates Herbie Flowers on bass and Tony Newman on drums.

Writing for Record Mirror in 1977, Bolan said, "'Celebrate Summer' has a very definite new wave feel about it. If anyone thinks it is deliberate they are quite right. I know a good thing when I hear it, and am young enough to enjoy adrenalin-rush rock."

== Release ==
"Celebrate Summer" was released by EMI Records on 12 August 1977. It was issued in a special picture sleeve bag. The song failed to garner significant airplay on BBC Radio when it was released, but did generate play on Radio Luxembourg and Radio Clyde.

To promote the single, T. Rex performed the song on Bolan's British TV series Marc on three occasions, with broadcast dates of 24 August, 31 August and 21 September, the latter being a posthumous broadcast after Bolan's death on 16 September. The episode broadcast on 7 September also featured the song being danced to by the dance troupe Heart Throb.

In the Record Mirror Reader's Poll for 1977, "Celebrate Summer" reached number 4 in the 'best single/album sleeve' category.

== Critical reception ==
On its release, Edwin Pouncey of Sounds felt "Celebrate Summer" had a "strong punk influence" and considered it to be Bolan's "best [single] for ages". Charles Shaar Murray of New Musical Express wrote, "For one golden instant I thought Marc had finally pulled off the unalloyed pop triumph that he needs as a convincing viable follow-up to 'Get It On'. This isn't it, but it's certainly the most likeable single he's made for a very long time, even though it borrows the melody and chord sequence of the Deviants' 'Let's Loot the Supermarket'."

Robin Smith of Record Mirror considered the song to be Bolan "return[ing] to his former glories". He said, "A sound reminiscent of his early days that takes off faster than a flight of white swans." Stan Sayer of the Daily Mirror commented, "Is Bolan really feeling his age or is he going, tongue in cheek, back in time with this chirpy little rock 'n' roller? The words may be modern, but the beat isn't. Still, a great combination."

In a retrospective review of the song, Dave Thompson, writing for AllMusic, described the song as "a thunderous re-creation of Bolan's classic old sound fed through the fiery updating of its punk rock legacy". He noted the "simple ingredients" of "pulsing guitar, heart-attack percussion, and a lyric which stands among the key anthems" and believed the song should have achieved "enormous" success. Mark Paytress, in his 2002 book Bolan: The Rise and Fall of a 20th Century Superstar, considered it to be "merely a quirky piece of upbeat pop" with only "a few seconds of blistering white noise guitar" recalling a new wave sound.

== Track listing ==
7-inch single (UK and France)

1. "Celebrate Summer" – 2:38
2. "Ride My Wheels" – 2:28

7-inch single (Germany)

1. "Celebrate Summer" – 2:38
2. "Tame My Tiger" – 2:33

== Personnel ==
T. Rex

- Marc Bolan – vocals, guitar, keyboards
- Herbie Flowers – bass
- Tony Newman – drums

Production

- Marc Bolan – producer
