= Laser Love (song) =

- 7" single cover

Single by T. Rex
- B-side: "Life's an Elevator"
- Released: 2 October 1976
- Genre: Glam rock; proto-punk
- Length: 3:37
- Label: T. Rex Wax Co.; EMI
- Songwriter(s): Marc Bolan
- Producer(s): Marc Bolan

T. Rex singles chronology
"I Love to Boogie" (1976)	"Laser Love" (1976)	"The Soul of My Suit" (1977)

"Laser Love" is a song by English glam rock band T. Rex. It was released as a non-album single in 1976 by record label T. Rex Wax Co.

== Release ==
"Laser Love" was released as a single on 2 October 1976 by record label T. Rex Wax Co. Neither side of the single was ever released on an official LP during the band's lifetime, yet both have been included on deluxe CD reissues of Futuristic Dragon. The song was in the UK Singles Chart for a total of four weeks, peaking at number 41.

In his book on glam rock, music historian Simon Reynolds described "Laser Love" a "proto-punky" song that was one of a smattering of excellent singles by T. Rex in their later years, further calling it "an undeserved flop."
