= Billy Super Duper =

Studio album by Marc Bolan & T. Rex
- Released: 1982
- Recorded: 1972 and 1975 at Chateau d'Herouvile, France; 1977 at Decibel Studios, London; 1982 at Crescent Studios, Bath, England
- Genre: Glam rock
- Length: 32:51
- Label: Marc on Wax
- Producer: John Bramley, Shan Bramley, Marc Bolan

T. Rex chronology
| Dandy in the Underworld (1977) | Billy Super Duper (1982) |

Marc Bolan chronology
| You Scare Me to Death (1981) | Billy Super Duper (1982) | Dance in the Midnight (1983) |

Professional ratings
Review scores
| Source | Rating |
|---|---|
| AllMusic | 3.5/5 stars |

Billy Super Duper is an album by English glam rock band T. Rex and Marc Bolan's second posthumous album release. Released in 1982 by record label Marc on Wax, it was the first LP of entirely new and unheard material released after Marc Bolan's death in 1977 as the previous posthumous release, You Scare Me to Death consisted of augmented versions of demos first released in 1974. Billy Super Duper consists of studio outtakes and home demos recorded by the band between 1972 and 1977, with arrangements produced by John and Shan Bramley (the heads of the Marc Bolan Fanclub at the time). The album was intended to "complete" the demos and bring them up to date with contemporary music.

== Release ==
Billy Super Duper was released in 1982 by record label Marc on Wax. It did not chart in the United Kingdom.

The concept behind the album was to release songs that would be on Bolan's next album, which was to be titled Jack Daniels had he survived; however, several songs were recorded for the aborted 1975 concept album Billy Super Duper, and the title track led to the album taking this name. The album bears little resemblance to Bolan's intended rock opera and is missing several key tracks that were recorded for the album and were readily available to the producers.

This album is the only way of hearing the song "Billy Super Duper" and the versions of "Depth Charge" and "Write Me a Song", which were never released in their unedited format. This led to many rumours being speculated about the fate of these tracks, including speculation that the producers permanently erased Bolan's guitar tracks or damaged the original tapes whilst editing them; in particular, the song "Billy Super Duper", which was originally fifteen minutes long, exists on this release at less than a third of its original length.

== Track listing ==
Side A
| No. | Title | Recording location(s) and date(s) | Length |
|---|---|---|---|
| 1. | "Billy Super Duper" | Chateau d'Herouville, 19 May 1975 | 3:39 |
| 2. | "Shy Boy" | Decibel Studios, April 1977 | 2:36 |
| 3. | "Depth Charge" | Chateau d'Herouville, 19 May 1975; Crescent Studios, March 1982 (guitar overdubs) | 3:58 |
| 4. | "Love Drunk" | Decibel Studios, April 1977 | 2:41 |
| 5. | "Buick MacKane & the Babe Shadow" | Chateau d'Herouville, 10 March 1972 | 3:24 |
| Total length: | | | 16:18 |

Side B
| No. | Title | Recording location(s) and date(s) | Length |
|---|---|---|---|
| 1. | "21st Century Stance" | Early 1977; Crescent Studios, March 1982 (bass, guitar and drum overdubs) | 2:35 |
| 2. | "Foxy Boy" | Decibel Studios, April 1977 | 2:15 |
| 3. | "Hot George" | Decibel Studios, April 1977; Crescent Studios, March 1982 (saxophone overdub) | 2:21 |
| 4. | "Mellow Love" | Decibel Studios, April 1977; Crescent Studios, March 1982 (string overdub) | 3:15 |
| 5. | "20th Century Baby" | Decibel Studios, April 1977 | 2:19 |
| 6. | "Write Me a Song (Supertuff)" | Unknown, 1976; Crescent Studios, March 1982 (bass, guitar and drum overdubs) | 3:08 |
| 7. | "Billy Super Duper (Reprise)" | | 0:40 |
| Total length: | | | 16:33 |

== Personnel ==
- Marc Bolan – vocals, guitars
- Mickey Finn – percussion on track 5
- Dino Dines – keyboards on tracks 1–4 and 7–10
- Gloria Jones – backing vocals on tracks 1, 7 and 9
- Steve Currie – bass on tracks 1, 3 and 5
- Davy Lutton – drums on tracks 1, 3
- Bill Legend – drums on track 5
- Herbie Flowers – bass on tracks 2, 4 and 7–10
- Tony Newman – drums on tracks 2, 4 and 7–9

1982 overdubs

- Pete Allerhand – second guitar on "Depth Charge"
- Stuart Gordon – bass and drums on tracks 6 and 11, strings on "Mellow Love"
- Manny Elias – drums on tracks 6 and 11
