= Dance in the Midnight =

Studio album by Marc Bolan
- Released: 30 December 1983
- Recorded: 1973–75
- Genre: Glam rock
- Length: 32:02
- Label: Marc on Wax
- Producer: John Bramley, Shan Bramley, Marc Bolan

Marc Bolan chronology
Billy Super Duper (1982)	Dance in the Midnight (1983)

Professional ratings
Review scores
Source	Rating
AllMusic	3.5/5 stars

Dance in the Midnight is a posthumous album credited to Marc Bolan of T. Rex. It was released in 1983 by record label Marc on Wax and was the third LP to be released after his death in 1977.

== Content ==
The album consists of unreleased studio outtakes and demos recorded by the band in the early to mid-1970s. The album contains overdubs recorded in the 1980s by session musicians at the request of the record's producers, John and Shan Bramley.

The majority of tracks have subsequently been released in their untouched format on the Unchained series.

== Release ==
Dance in the Midnight was released in 1983 by record label Marc on Wax. It reached number 83 in the UK Albums Chart.

== Track listing ==
All tracks composed by Marc Bolan; except where indicated

Side A
No.	Title	Length
1.	"Dance in the Midnight"	3:14
2.	"Everyday"	2:58
3.	"Saturday Night"	3:30
4.	"Metropolis"	4:17
5.	"Brain Police"	2:43
Total length:		16:42

Side B
No.	Title	Writer(s)	Length
1.	"Stand by Me"	Ben E. King, Jerry Leiber, Mike Stoller	2:51
2.	"All My Love"		3:18
3.	"Fast Blues (Easy Action)"		3:06
4.	"Do I Love Thee"		4:00
5.	"Down Home Lady"		2:05
Total length:			15:20
