= Dandy in the Underworld =

Studio album by T. Rex
- Released: 11 March 1977
- Recorded: May 1976; August 1976
- Studio: MRI, Los Angeles; Decibel, AIR and Trident, London
- Genre: Glam rock
- Length: 37:52
- Label: EMI
- Producer: Marc Bolan

T. Rex chronology
Futuristic Dragon (1976)	Dandy in the Underworld (1977)	Billy Super Duper (1982)

Singles from Dandy in the Underworld
- 1. "I Love to Boogie" Released: 11 June 1976; 2. "The Soul of My Suit" Released: 18 March 1977; 3. "Dandy in the Underworld" Released: 27 May 1977; 4. "Crimson Moon" Released: 14 April 1978

Dandy in the Underworld is the twelfth and final studio album by English rock band T. Rex. It was released on 11 March 1977 by record label EMI. It reached number 26 in the UK charts, the band's highest-charting album since 1974's Zinc Alloy. The lead-off single "I Love to Boogie" had been a hit single in the UK the previous year, peaking at number 13 in the singles chart.

Dandy in the Underworld was regarded by critics as a comeback for the band. It was praised for the strength of the songwriting and Bolan's vocal performances. However, it would prove to be the band's final album, as Marc Bolan died in a car crash in September 1977 at the age of 29. In 2006, an album of alternative versions and unreleased tracks called Final Cuts was released.

== Background and recording ==
At the time of the album's release, Marc Bolan and T. Rex were on a UK tour, supported by the Damned. The album and tour were notable for marking a return to form for the band.

The sessions had started in May 1976 at Decibel Studios in London with the recording of "I Love to Boogie", with Steve Currie (bass), Davey Lutton (drums) and Dino Dines (piano). Later recordings took place at MRI Studios in Los Angeles, and continued at Decibel Studios, AIR Studios and Trident Studios in London.

The track "Visions of Domino" was a re-recording of an unreleased song, "Funky London Childhood" with completely rewritten lyrics, played live on the previous Futuristic Dragon tour in 1976.

== Music ==
Biographer Mark Paytress noted that the "plastic soul" style of the band's previous works was no more. Bolan had reacquainted himself with the rock rhythms of his youth on the album. Bolan's production was more direct. Most of the material had been recorded in 1976.

== Release ==
Dandy in the Underworld was released on 11 March 1977, six months before Bolan's death. It was launched at London's leading punk rock venue The Roxy.

The title track was released as a single in a remixed and re-recorded version with the offending lyrics "Exalted companion of cocaine nights" being changed to "T. Rex nights". "Crimson Moon" was also released as a single the same year, as well as the non-album track "Celebrate Summer" in August.

Dandy in the Underworld was remastered for CD by Edsel Records in 1994 as part of their extensive T. Rex reissue campaign. A number of bonus tracks were added (see below). A companion release, entitled Prince of Players (The Alternate Dandy in the Underworld) was released in 1998 and contained alternative versions and studio rough mixes of the main album and bonus tracks. A combined album digipak was released in 2002.

An album of unreleased tracks and alternative versions of songs from the sessions that produced the album was released in 2006, titled Final Cuts. Most of these tracks were recorded at AIR Studios Oxford Street, with the addition of four tracks recorded at Decibel Studios in Stamford Hill in April 1977 after the release of Dandy in the Underworld. Seven of the twelve songs on Final Cuts were not released during Bolan's lifetime. It includes an alternative cut of the final T. Rex single "Celebrate Summer" as well as "Mellow Love", "Write Me A Song", "Hot George", "Shy Boy", "Foxy Boy", "Love Drunk" and "20th Century Baby".

== Reception and legacy ==
Professional ratings
Review scores
Source	Rating
AllMusic	3.5/5 stars
The Encyclopedia of Popular Music	3/5 stars
MusicHound Rock: The Essential Album Guide	1/5 stars
New Musical Express	3/5 stars
Pitchfork	7.9/10
Sounds	4/5 stars

Dandy in the Underworld gathered the most consistently positive reviews for any T. Rex album in five years. Having fallen from critical and commercial favour, the band had endured some fiercely hostile press, but NME, which had been amongst the most negative, noted of the album: "very listenable, well arranged [and] immaculately played." The Sydney Morning Herald noted the "superb production that gives bite and clarity to every note".

In a positive retrospective review, AllMusic stated that the album was "packed solid with powerful pop". The reviewer noted the "revitalized energy" and claimed it was "the greatest record" Bolan had released in years. Pitchfork praised the album saying, that it "finds a reinvigorated Bolan crafting some of his best hooks and calibrating his catchiest grooves in years". Reviewer Stephen M. Deusner said the tracks were well balanced: "The cosmic 'Crimson Moon', the infectious 'I'm a Fool for You Girl', and the album's centerpiece, 'Jason B. Sad', alternate between carefree and cautious, conjuring a gravity that counterbalances the upbeat, stripped-down rhythms."

The title track was prominently used in BBC TV series The Pursuit of Love, in the episode one of the first season which was broadcast in 2021.

== Track listing ==
All tracks written by Marc Bolan, except where noted.

Side A
No.	Title	Length
1.	"Dandy in the Underworld"	4:33
2.	"Crimson Moon"	3:22
3.	"Universe"	2:43
4.	"I'm a Fool for You Girl"	2:16
5.	"I Love to Boogie"	2:14
6.	"Visions of Domino"	2:23

Side B
No.	Title	Length
1.	"Jason B. Sad"	3:22
2.	"Groove a Little"	3:24
3.	"The Soul of My Suit"	2:37
4.	"Hang-Ups"	3:28
5.	"Pain and Love"	3:41
6.	"Teen Riot Structure"	3:33

1994 CD reissue bonus tracks
No.	Title	Length
13.	"To Know You Is to Love You" (Phil Spector)	2:43
14.	"City Port"	2:41
15.	"Dandy in the Underworld" (Single Version)	3:49
16.	"Tame My Tiger"	2:30
17.	"Celebrate Summer"	2:36

Prince of Players (The Alternative Dandy in the Underworld)
No.	Title	Length
1.	"Dandy in the Underworld" (Live)	3:58
2.	"Crimson Moon"	3:10
3.	"I'm a Fool for You Girl"	2:17
4.	"I Love to Boogie"	2:11
5.	"Funky London Childhood"	2:29
6.	"Jason B. Sad"	3:26
7.	"Groove a Little" (Live)	3:25
8.	"The Soul of My Suit"	4:16
9.	"Hang Ups" (Live)	4:59
10.	"Pain and Love"	3:49
11.	"Teen Riot Structure"	3:38
12.	"To Know You Is to Love You"	3:41
13.	"City Port (1973)"	2:55
14.	"Tame My Tiger"	2:46
15.	"Celebrate Summer"	2:20
16.	"I Love to Boogie"	2:05
17.	"Soul of My Suit"	2:41
18.	"Pain and Love"	1:31
19.	"Teen Riot Structure"	2:42
20.	"Celebrate Summer"	2:49
21.	"Weird Strings"	5:33

== Personnel ==
- Marc Bolan – vocals, guitar, bass guitar, percussion, maracas, tambourine
- Steve Harley – backing vocals
- Alfalpha – backing vocals
- Nick Laird-Clowes – backing vocals
- Andy Harley – backing vocals
- Sam Harley – backing vocals
- Gloria Jones – backing vocals
- Colin Jacas – backing vocals
- Dino Dines – keyboards
- Tony Newman – drums
- Herbie Flowers – bass guitar
- Scott Edwards – bass guitar
- Paul Humphrey – drums
- Miller Anderson – guitar
- Steve Currie – bass guitar
- Davy Lutton – drums

Paul Fenton - drums

- Bernie Casey – backing vocals on "The Soul of My suit"
- Chris Mercer – saxophone
- Bud Beadle – saxophone, flute
- J. Long – violin

Technical

- Mike Stavrou – engineer AIR Studios
- Jon Walls – engineer AIR Studios
- Jennifer Maidman – engineer Decibel Studio
- Mick O'Halloran – Tour Manager/Backline
- Cliff Wright – Backline/Guitar tech
- Produced by Marc Bolan

== Charts ==
Chart (1977)	Peak position	Ref
UK Albums Chart	26	
