= London Boys (T. Rex song) =

Single by T. Rex
- B-side: "Solid Baby" (UK): "Chrome Sitar" (Germany)
- Released: 21 February 1976
- Genre: Glam rock
- Length: 2:21
- Label: T. Rex Wax Co.
- Songwriter(s): Marc Bolan
- Producer(s): Marc Bolan

T. Rex singles chronology
"Dreamy Lady" (1976)	"London Boys" (1976)	"I Love to Boogie" (1976)

"London Boys" is a song by English glam rock band T. Rex. It was released a single in 1976 by record label T. Rex Wax Co. The track was not released on an album, but was originally intended to feature in Bolan's aborted rock operas The London Opera and Billy Super Duper.

== Content ==
Like all of T. Rex's music, the song is written by Marc Bolan.

== Release ==
"London Boys" was released as a single on 21 February 1976 by record label T. Rex Wax Co. The track was not released on an album, but was originally intended to feature in Bolan's aborted rock operas The London Opera and Billy Super Duper. Its B-side, "Solid Baby", is taken from T. Rex's tenth studio album Bolan's Zip Gun (1975).

The song was in the UK charts for a total of three weeks, peaking at number 40.
