= You Scare Me to Death =

Studio album by Marc Bolan
- Released: 1981
- Recorded: 1966 at De Lane Lea Studios; 1981 at Radio Luxembourg Studios and The Townhouse
- Length: 31:41
- Label: Cherry Red
- Producer: Simon Napier-Bell

Marc Bolan chronology
You Scare Me to Death (1981)	Billy Super Duper (1982)

Professional ratings
Review scores
Source	Rating
AllMusic	3/5 stars

You Scare Me to Death is a posthumous album credited to Marc Bolan of T. Rex. Released in 1981 by record label Cherry Red, it is first LP of material released after his death in 1977.

== Content ==
The album consists of outtakes and demos recorded by Bolan in 1966. Some of the songs would later be recorded by Bolan's band, Tyrannosaurus Rex. Most of these tracks have also been released in their original form on the album, The Beginning of Doves (1974). In 1981, backing instrumentals were recorded and added to Bolan's original recordings.

== Release ==
You Scare Me to Death was released in 1981 by record label Cherry Red. The album reached No. 88 on the UK Albums Chart. The title track was originally called "Horrible Breath" and was written as a proposed television jingle for Amplex tablets.

== Track listing ==
All tracks are written by Marc Bolan.

No.	Title	Length
1.	"You Scare Me to Death"	2:41
2.	"You've Got the Power"	2:38
3.	"Eastern Spell"	2:50
4.	"Charlie"	2:41
5.	"I'm Weird"	1:55
6.	"Hippy Gumbo"	2:26

Side B
No.	Title	Length
1.	"Mustang Ford"	2:39
2.	"Observations"	2:38
3.	"Jasmine '49"	3:02
4.	"Cat Black"	2:33
5.	"Black and White Incident"	2:50
6.	"The Perfumed Garden of Gulliver Smith"	2:48
Total length:		31:41

== Personnel ==
- Marc Bolan – vocals, acoustic guitar

1981 instrumentals

- Brian Odgers – bass guitar
- Graham Jarvis – drums
- Bernie Holland – guitar
- Graham Todd – piano
- Dyan Birch – backing vocals
- Frank Collins – backing vocals
- Paddy McHugh – backing vocals
