= Marc (TV series) =

1977 British TV pop music series

- Genre: Pop music show
- Directed by: Nicholas Ferguson
- Presented by: Marc Bolan
- Theme music composer: Marc Bolan
- Opening theme: "Sing Me a Song"
- Country of origin: United Kingdom
- Original language: English
- No. of seasons: 1
- No. of episodes: 6

Production
- Producer: Muriel Young
- Camera setup: Multi-camera
- Running time: 25 minutes
- Production company: Granada Television

Original release
- Network: ITV
- Release: 24 August – 28 September 1977

Marc is a British television series presented by T. Rex's lead singer Marc Bolan. It was produced in Manchester by Granada Television for the ITV network. A second series was planned but Bolan died before it could be produced.

Produced by Muriel Young and directed by Nicholas Ferguson, it ran for six weekly episodes in the autumn of 1977, before its host died in a car crash on 16 September that year. A pop music show with a very limited budget and markedly low production values, it gave Bolan a chance to showcase punk bands such as Generation X, the Jam, Radio Stars and Eddie and the Hot Rods. T. Rex lip synced at least three songs each week, with Bolan's guitar never appearing to be plugged in, a mixture of new versions of their old hits, and fresh tracks, while the guests were slotted in between. Not all were as notable as those listed above, though they also included Roger Taylor, drummer with the rock band Queen, in a rare solo TV appearance. They were also joined by a dance troupe called 'Heart Throb', images of whom standing next to Bolan, on Shutterstock, dated 10 August 1977, identify them as Isobelle Skullnice; June Griffiths; Alison Basham; and Kirsty Hayes. Bolan introduced their "Ain't it Strange", single, on Show 6; (by which time "Pam, Michael, and David" appear on the credits). Bolan referred to them in Show 6 as "My" (his) dancers".

After his friend David Bowie had soloed the last episode's penultimate song, "Heroes", he and Bolan were meant to duet "Sleeping Next To You", into the fade. A few seconds into Bowie's vocal, Bolan tripped over a microphone cable, fell forward, recovered, and smiled. Bowie is said to have called out "Could we have a wooden box for Marc to stand on?". Following the show, Bolan and Bowie co-wrote and recorded a rough outline of a new song, "Madman". The new wave band Cuddly Toys found a bootleg tape and recorded it, which became a UK Indie Chart single and featured on their Guillotine Theatre album.

The final show was recorded on 7 September 1977, but not broadcast until after Bolan's funeral on 20 September 1977, which was also attended by David Bowie and Rod Stewart, among others.

An edited highlights compilation was released in the United Kingdom on DVD in 2005. It contained only the T. Rex performances from each of the six episodes. ITV Studios licensed it for release once again, in 2017; that Region 2 (DVD region codes) release contained additional T. Rex TV performances from Shang a Lang, 'Supersonic', and 'Get it Together', all of which pre-dated the Marc shows, whilst still excluding the other artists' songs. In 2007, a DVD release of all six shows in their entirety was released in Japan only.

== Show details ==
Show 1 24 August 1977

1. "Sing Me a Song" – Marc Bolan with T. Rex
2. "All Around the World" – The Jam
3. "I Love to Boogie" – Marc Bolan with T. Rex
4. "Cool Wind From the North" – Stephanie de Sykes
5. "No Russians in Russia" – Radio Stars
6. Heart Throb's dance ("You Made Me Believe in Magic" – Bay City Rollers)
7. "Celebrate Summer" – Marc Bolan with T. Rex
8. "You Got What It Takes" – Showaddywaddy
9. "Jeepster" – Marc Bolan with T. Rex

Show 2 31 August 1977

1. Show credits
2. "Celebrate Summer" – Marc Bolan with T. Rex
3. Heart Throb's dance ("Roots Rock" - Desmond Dekker)
4. "If I Can Just Get Through Tonight" – Alfalpha
5. "You Made Me Believe in Magic" – Bay City Rollers
6. "New York City" – Marc Bolan with T. Rex
7. "Ride a White Swan" – Marc Bolan with T. Rex
8. "Just a Little Tenderness" – Mud
9. "People in Love" – 10cc
10. "Endless Sleep" – Marc Bolan with T. Rex

Show 3 7 September 1977

1. "Sing Me a Song" – Marc Bolan with T. Rex
2. "Groove a Little" – Marc Bolan with T. Rex
3. "Looking After Number One" – The Boomtown Rats
4. "You're My Baby" – Jamie Wild
5. "Let's Dance" – Marc Bolan with T. Rex
6. Heart Throb's dance ("Celebrate Summer" – Marc Bolan with T. Rex)
7. "Get Your Love Right" – Alan David
8. "Quark Strangeness and Charm" – Hawkwind
9. "Hot Love" – Marc Bolan with T. Rex

Show 4 14 September 1977

1. Show credits
2. "New York City" – Marc Bolan with T. Rex
3. "Idolizer" – Denis Conly
4. "Tulane" – Steve Gibbons Band
5. "I Love to Boogie" – Marc Bolan with T. Rex
6. "Endless Sleep" – Marc Bolan with T. Rex
7. "Confessing" – Robin Askwith
8. "I Wanna Testify" – Roger Taylor (Queen)
9. "Dandy in the Underworld" – Marc Bolan with T. Rex

Show 5 21 September 1977

1. "Sing Me a Song" – Marc Bolan with T. Rex
2. "Sunshine of Your Love" – Rosetta Stone
3. Heart Throb's dance ("Get On" - Hurriganes (FIN))
4. "Bring Back the Love" – Blue
5. "Celebrate Summer" – Marc Bolan with T. Rex
6. "No Russians in Russia" – Radio Stars
7. "Dancing in the Moonlight (It's Caught Me in Its Spotlight)" – Thin Lizzy
8. "Get It On" – Marc Bolan with T. Rex

Show 6 28 September 1977

1. Show credits
2. "Debora" – Marc Bolan with T. Rex
3. "Your Generation" – Generation X
4. "I'm a Fighter" – Lip Service
5. Heart Throb's dance ("Ain't it Strange" – )
6. "Groove A Little" – Marc Bolan with T. Rex
7. "Ride A White Swan" – Marc Bolan with T. Rex
8. Heart Throb's dance ("I Haven't Stopped Dancing Yet" – Gonzalez)
9. "Do Anything You Want to Do" – Eddie and the Hot Rods
10. "Heroes" – David Bowie
11. Instrumental jam ("Sleeping Next To You" – David Bowie and Marc Bolan & T. Rex)
