= Dreamy Lady =

Single by T. Rex

from the album Futuristic Dragon
- B-side: Do You Wanna Dance?; Dock of the Bay
- Released: 26 September 1975
- Genre: Glam rock; disco
- Length: 2:55
- Label: EMI (UK)
- Songwriter: Marc Bolan
- Producer: Marc Bolan

T. Rex singles chronology
"New York City" (1975)	"Dreamy Lady" (1975)	"London Boys" (1976)

"Dreamy Lady" is a 1975 single released by the English glam rock band T. Rex, credited to 'T. Rex Disco Party'. The track features on the 1976 album, Futuristic Dragon. Its B-side consists of covers of the songs "Do You Wanna Dance?", originally by Bobby Freeman, and "(Sittin' On) The Dock of the Bay", originally by Otis Redding. The latter of these two covers is a Gloria Jones solo song, produced by Bolan. The single is notable for its dramatic departure from the 'T. Rex sound' and its disco influence. Demo versions of the song were performed in a reggae style.

The single was in the UK Singles Chart charts for a total of five weeks, peaking at number 30.
