= Futuristic Dragon =

Studio album by T. Rex
- Released: 30 January 1976
- Studio: MRI, Hollywood, California; Paragon, Chicago, Illinois; Scorpio Sound, London, UK
- Genre: Glam rock; blue-eyed soul; disco
- Length: 40:22
- Label: EMI
- Producer: Marc Bolan

T. Rex chronology
Bolan's Zip Gun (1975)	Futuristic Dragon (1976)	Dandy in the Underworld (1977)

Singles from Futuristic Dragon
- 1. "New York City" Released: 12 July 1975; 2. "Dreamy Lady" Released: 26 September 1975

Futuristic Dragon is the eleventh studio album by English rock band T. Rex, released worldwide on 30 January 1976 by EMI Records bar North America. The album was preceded by two successful singles that went into the UK chart, "New York City" and "Dreamy Lady". The album saw Marc Bolan continuing to experiment, blending rock with soul music and disco elements on certain tracks. Derided by critics upon release, the album has since been reappraised by major British and US music media.

== Content, music and sleeve ==
The album features some unusually dense production from singer and songwriter Marc Bolan, especially on "Chrome Sitar" and "Calling All Destroyers", which contained unusual musical embellishments such as the sitar and other sonic sound effects.

The album includes a nod to a new genre disco on the track "Dreamy Lady", which was released as a single under the moniker of "T Rex Disco Party". Futuristic Dragon also contains tracks heavily influenced by American soul music, which Bolan had been experimenting with since 1973. "All Alone", "Ride My Wheels", and "Dawn Storm" all feature predominantly soul-based rhythms and instrumentation.

The sleeve illustration was conceived by artist George Underwood, who had first worked with Bolan on the 1968 Tyrannosaurus Rex album My People Were Fair and Had Sky in Their Hair....

== Release ==
Preceded by the release of two UK Top-40-hit singles from the album, "New York City" which went at number 15 and "Dreamy Lady" which reached the top 30, Futuristic Dragon was released on 30 January 1976. It reached number 50 in the UK Albums Chart. In the US, Futuristic Dragon wasn't issued domestically before 1987.

Futuristic Dragon was remastered for CD by Edsel Records in 1994. A number of bonus tracks were added including b-sides. A companion release, entitled Dazzling Raiment (The Alternate Futuristic Dragon), was released in 1997 and contained alternative versions, studio rough mixes and solo recordings of the main album. A combined album digipak was released in 2002.

== Critical reception ==
Professional ratings
Review scores
Source	Rating
AllMusic	3/5 stars
New Musical Express	3/5 stars
Pitchfork	6.7/10
PopMatters	7/10

Initial reviews were universally negative. However, retrospective reviews have been more favourable. PopMatters wrote: "The album defies expectation, presenting a surprisingly consistent set of tunes dovetailing with the burgeoning disco scene without entirely partaking of it", adding that the record was "full of lush orchestration and soul-style backing vocals". Pitchfork wrote "Futuristic Dragon has enough winning moments to suggest an upturn [...] the album wins your sympathies: It's good enough to make you wish it were better." Alexis Petridis praised it in the Guardian, saying: it "was packed with fantastic songs – the gorgeous Dawn Storm was by far the most successful of his attempts to meld his sound with soul music – and had it been released as the followup to Tanx, it might have arrested his commercial slide".

== Track listing ==
All tracks are written by Marc Bolan.

No.	Title	Length
1.	"Futuristic Dragon" (Introduction)	1:52
2.	"Jupiter Liar"	3:40
3.	"Chrome Sitar"	3:13
4.	"All Alone"	2:48
5.	"New York City"	3:55
6.	"My Little Baby"	3:06
7.	"Calling All Destroyers"	3:53

Side B
No.	Title	Length
1.	"Theme for a Dragon"	2:00
2.	"Sensation Boulevard"	3:48
3.	"Ride My Wheels"	2:25
4.	"Dreamy Lady"	2:51
5.	"Dawn Storm"	3:42
6.	"Casual Agent"	2:53

1994 CD reissue bonus tracks
No.	Title	Length
14.	"London Boys"	2:19
15.	"Laser Love"	3:35
16.	"Life's an Elevator"	2:24

Dazzling Raiment (The Alternate Futuristic Dragon)
No.	Title	Length
1.	"Futuristic Dragon" (Introduction)	1:46
2.	"Chrome Sitar"	3:16
3.	"All Alone"	2:50
4.	"New York City"	3:57
5.	"My Little Baby"	3:51
6.	"Sensation Boulevard"	3:48
7.	"Dreamy Lady"	2:50
8.	"Dawn Storm"	3:31
9.	"Casual Agent"	2:54
10.	"London Boys"	2:20
11.	"Life's an Elevator"	2:25
12.	"Futuristic Dragon" (Introduction)	1:52
13.	"All Alone"	3:51
14.	"Dreamy Lady"	2:31
15.	"Casual Agent"	4:05
16.	"Casual Agent"	4:04
17.	"All Alone" (solo recording)	2:46
18.	"Dreamy Lady" (solo recording)	2:19
19.	"London Boys" (solo recording)	1:55
20.	"Life's an Elevator" (solo recording)	2:01

== Personnel ==
- Marc Bolan – vocals, guitars, moog
- Gloria Jones – backing vocals, clavinet
- Steve Currie – bass guitar
- Davy Lutton – drums
- Dino Dines – keyboards
- Jimmie Haskell – string instruments

Technical

- George Underwood – cover artwork

== Charts ==
Chart (1976)	Peak position	Ref
UK Albums Chart	50	
