= Tony Newman =

English rock drummer (born 1943)

- Born: 17 March 1943 (age 83); Southampton, Hampshire, England
- Genre: Rock
- Instrument: Drums

Richard Anthony Newman (born 17 March 1943) is an English rock drummer. He was at various times a member of the bands Sounds Incorporated, May Blitz, Three Man Army, T. Rex, and Boxer. He has performed with Little Richard, Jeff Beck, David Bowie, George Harrison, Robert Palmer, Eric Clapton, Donovan, Mick Ronson, Gene Vincent, Crystal Gayle, The Everly Brothers and others. In 1965, Newman played with Sounds Incorporated as one of the acts opening for the Beatles at Shea Stadium in New York City.

Newman played on Donovan's "Barabajagal" (1968), and on Jeff Beck's Beck-Ola (1969). For David Bowie, he performed on the Diamond Dogs album in 1974, and live with Bowie on his subsequent North American tour, including a recording at the Tower Theater in Upper Darby Township, Pennsylvania, released as David Live. Newman was one of the featured drummers on the soundtrack to the film Tommy.

In 1977, as a member of T. Rex, Newman played with Dino Dines, Herbie Flowers and Marc Bolan on the latter's Marc television series. This line up plus Miller Anderson recorded the bulk of the band's final album Dandy in the Underworld.

His son, Richard Newman, is also a drummer who has performed regularly with Sam Brown and Deborah Bonham among others, and has also played drums for Jefferson Starship on several UK tours.

== Collaborations ==
With David Bowie

- Diamond Dogs (RCA Records, 1974)
- David Live (RCA Records, 1974)

With Crystal Gayle

- Best Always (Branson Entertainment, 1993)

With John Prine

- Aimless Love (Oh Boy Records, 1984)
- A John Prine Christmas (Oh Boy Records, 1993)

With Madeline Bell

- Comin' Atcha (RCA Victor, 1973)

With Jackie Lomax

- Is This What You Want? (Apple Records, 1969)

With Joan Armatrading

- Back to the Night (A&M Records, 1975)

With Sam Brown

- 43 Minutes (All at Once Records, 1993)
