= Dino Dines =

British musician (1944–2004)

Background information
- Birth name: Peter Leslie
- Born: 17 December 1944; England
- Died: 28 January 2004 (aged 59)
- Genres: Rock music
- Occupation(s): Keyboardist, musician
- Instrument: Keyboards
- Formerly of: T. Rex the Apostolic Intervention; Keef Hartley Band

Peter Leslie "Dino" Dines (17 December 1944 – 28 January 2004) was a British keyboard player, best known for his work as a member of T. Rex. He was also a member of the Apostolic Intervention and the Keef Hartley Band.

== Early career ==
Dines was a member of the Apostolic Intervention alongside future Humble Pie/Syd Barrett drummer Jerry Shirley. Their song "(Tell Me) Have You Ever Seen Me?" was donated by future Humble Pie frontman Steve Marriott.

Later, Dines played in the Keef Hartley Band, fronted by his future T. Rex bandmate Miller Anderson, also contributing keyboards to Anderson's first solo album, Bright City. During Dines' tenure they released the albums Halfbreed and The Battle of North West Six. He later returned for the album Overdog.

== T. Rex ==
Dines joined T. Rex in mid-1974 and remained until they disbanded in 1977 due to leader Marc Bolan's death in a car accident. During Dines' time in the band they recorded and released the albums Bolan's Zip Gun, Futuristic Dragon and Dandy in the Underworld, as well as the UK Top 30 hit singles "Light Of Love", "New York City" and "I Love to Boogie". He performed with the band extensively on the TV show Supersonic as well as on Bolan's own show Marc.

== Later years and death ==
Dines spent his later years performing with T. Rex tribute band T.Rextasy, and played on their albums. He died of a heart attack in 2004, aged 59.
