= Marc Bolan =

English guitarist and singer (1947–1977)

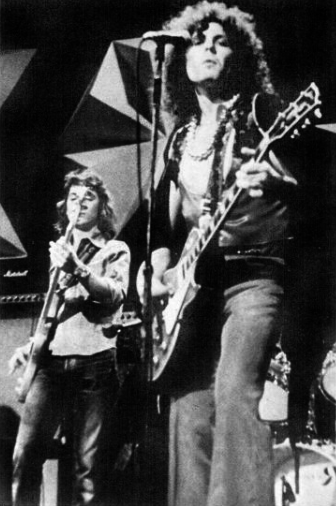
- Bolan in 1973

Background information
- Born: Mark Feld; 30 September 1947; Homerton, London, England
- Died: 16 September 1977 (aged 29) Barnes, London, England
- Genres: Glam rock; psychedelic folk; rock and roll
- Occupations: Musician; singer; songwriter; poet
- Instruments: Vocals; guitar
- Years active: 1957–1977
- Labels: Decca; Reprise; Blue Thumb; Regal Zonophone; EMI; A&M; Fly
- Formerly of: T. Rex; John's Children

Marc Bolan (/ˈboʊlən/ BOH-lən; born Mark Feld; 30 September 1947 – 16 September 1977) was an English guitarist, singer-songwriter and poet. He was a pioneer of the glam rock movement in the early 1970s with his band T. Rex. Bolan is an influence on artists in the genres of glam rock, punk, post-punk, new wave, indie rock, Britpop and alternative rock. He was posthumously inducted into the Rock and Roll Hall of Fame in 2020 as a member of T. Rex.

In the late 1960s, Bolan rose to fame as the founder and leader of the psychedelic folk band Tyrannosaurus Rex, with whom he released four critically acclaimed albums and had one minor hit, "Debora". Bolan had started as an acoustic singer-writer before heading into electric music prior to the recording of T. Rex's first single "Ride a White Swan", which went to number two in the UK singles chart. From 1970 to 1973, T. Rex achieved a level of popularity in the UK comparable to the Beatles, with a run of eleven top ten singles, four of which reached number one: "Hot Love", "Get It On", "Telegram Sam" and "Metal Guru". The 1971 album Electric Warrior, with all songs written by Bolan, received critical acclaim, reached number 1 in the UK and became a landmark album in glam rock. From 1973, he started marrying rock with other influences, including funk, soul, gospel, disco and R&B.

Bolan died in a car crash in Barnes, south-west London in 1977, and a stone memorial and bronze bust were unveiled at the site, now Marc Bolan's Rock Shrine, in 1997 and 2002. His musical influence as a guitarist and songwriter is profound; he inspired many later acts over the following decades. Bolan's March 1971 appearance on the BBC's music show Top of the Pops, wearing glitter on his face, performing the UK chart topper "Hot Love" is cited as the start of the glam rock movement.

Music critic Ken Barnes called Bolan "the man who started it all". The 1971 album Electric Warrior has been described by AllMusic as "the album that essentially kick-started the UK glam rock craze". Producer Tony Visconti, who worked with Bolan during his heyday, stated: "What I saw in Marc Bolan had nothing to do with strings, or very high standards of artistry; what I saw in him was raw talent. I saw genius. I saw a potential rock star in Marc – right from the minute, the hour I met him."

== Early life ==
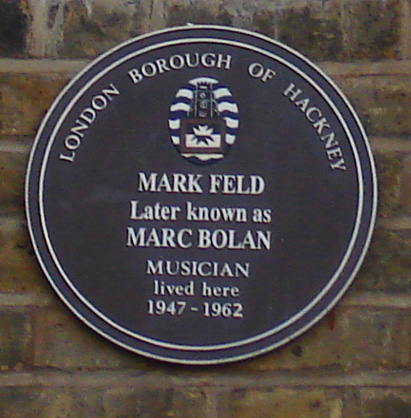
Plaque marking Bolan's childhood home, 25 Stoke Newington Common, Hackney, east London

Bolan was born Mark Feld at Hackney Hospital and grew up at 25 Stoke Newington Common, in the borough of Hackney, east London, with his elder brother Harry and Bolan as the youngest son of Simeon ("Sid") Feld (1920–1991), a cosmetics salesman and former lorry driver, and Phyllis Winifred (née Atkins; 1927–1991), who ran a stall at Berwick Street Market in Soho. His father was an Ashkenazi Jew with roots in Russia and Poland, while his mother was English, originally from Fulham. Moving to Wimbledon, southwest London, he fell in love with the rock and roll of Gene Vincent, Eddie Cochran, Arthur Crudup and Chuck Berry, and hung around coffee bars such as the 2i's in Soho.

Bolan was a pupil at Northwold Primary School, Upper Clapton. At the age of nine, he was given his first guitar and began a skiffle band. While at school, he played guitar in "Susie and the Hula Hoops", a trio whose vocalist was a 12-year-old Helen Shapiro. During lunch breaks at school, he would play his guitar in the playground to a small audience of friends. At 15, he was expelled from the now defunct William Wordsworth Secondary School, with his friend celebrity photographer, Richard Young. According to another of his friends: "He'd done something wrong and he went to see the headmaster, or the deputy headmaster, Mr. Pearson. He said he was going to give him the cane and Mark said no. He told him to hold out his hand and Mark nutted him."

He appeared as an extra in an episode of the television show Orlando, dressed as a mod. Bolan briefly joined a modelling agency and became a "John Temple Boy", appearing in a clothing catalogue for the menswear store. He was a model for the suits in their catalogues as well as for cardboard cut-outs to be displayed in shop windows. In 1962, Town magazine featured him under the name Mark Feld as an early example of the mod movement in a photo spread orchestrated by Evening Standard columnist Angus McGill.

== Music career ==
=== 1964–1967: Early career ===
In 1964, Bolan met his first manager, Geoffrey Delaroy-Hall, and recorded a slick commercial track backed by session musicians called "All at Once" (a song very much in the style of his youthful hero, Cliff Richard, the "English Elvis"), which was later released posthumously by Danielz and Caron Willans in 2008 as a very limited edition seven-inch vinyl after the original tape recording was passed on to them by Delaroy-Hall. This track is one of Bolan's first professional recordings.

Bolan then changed his stage name to Toby Tyler when he met and moved in with child actor Allan Warren, who became his second manager. This encounter afforded Bolan a lifeline to the heart of show business, as Warren saw Bolan's potential while he spent hours sitting cross-legged on Warren's floor playing his acoustic guitar. Bolan at this time liked to appear wearing a corduroy peaked cap similar to his then-current source of inspiration, Bob Dylan. A series of photographs was commissioned with photographer Michael McGrath, although he recalls that Bolan "left no impression" on him at the time. Warren also hired a recording studio and had Bolan's first acetates cut. Two tracks were later released; the Bob Dylan song "Blowin' in the Wind" and Dion's "The Road I'm On (Gloria)". A version of Betty Everett's "You're No Good" (still unreleased) was later submitted to EMI as an audition tape, but was turned down.

Warren later sold Bolan's contract and recordings for £200 to his landlord, property mogul David Kirch, in lieu of three months' back rent, but Kirch was too busy with his property empire to do anything for him. A year or so later, Bolan's mother pushed into Kirch's office and shouted at him that he had done nothing for her son. She demanded he tear up the contract and he willingly complied. The tapes of the first two tracks produced during the Toby Tyler recording session vanished for over 25 years before resurfacing in 1991 and selling for nearly $8,000. Their eventual release on CD in 1993 made available some of the earliest of Bolan's known recordings.

He signed to Decca Records in August 1965. At this point his name changed to Marc Bolan via Marc Bowland. There are several accounts of why Bolan was chosen, including that it was derived from James Bolam, that it was a contraction of Bob Dylan, and – according to Bolan himself – that Decca Records chose the name. He recorded his debut single "The Wizard" with the Ladybirds on backing vocals (later finding fame with Benny Hill), and studio session musicians playing all the instruments. "The Wizard", Bolan's first single, was released on 19 November 1965. It featured Jimmy Page and Big Jim Sullivan, was produced by Jim Economides, with music director Mike Leander. Two solo acoustic demos recorded shortly afterwards by the same team ("Reality" and "Song for a Soldier") have still only been given a limited official release in 2015 on seven-inch vinyl. Both songs are in a folk style reminiscent of Dylan and Donovan. A third song, "That's the Bag I'm In", written by New York folk singer and Dylan contemporary Fred Neil, was also committed to tape, but has not yet been released. In June 1966, a second official single was also released, with session-musician accompaniment, "The Third Degree", backed by "San Francisco Poet", Bolan's paean to the beat poets. Neither song made the charts.

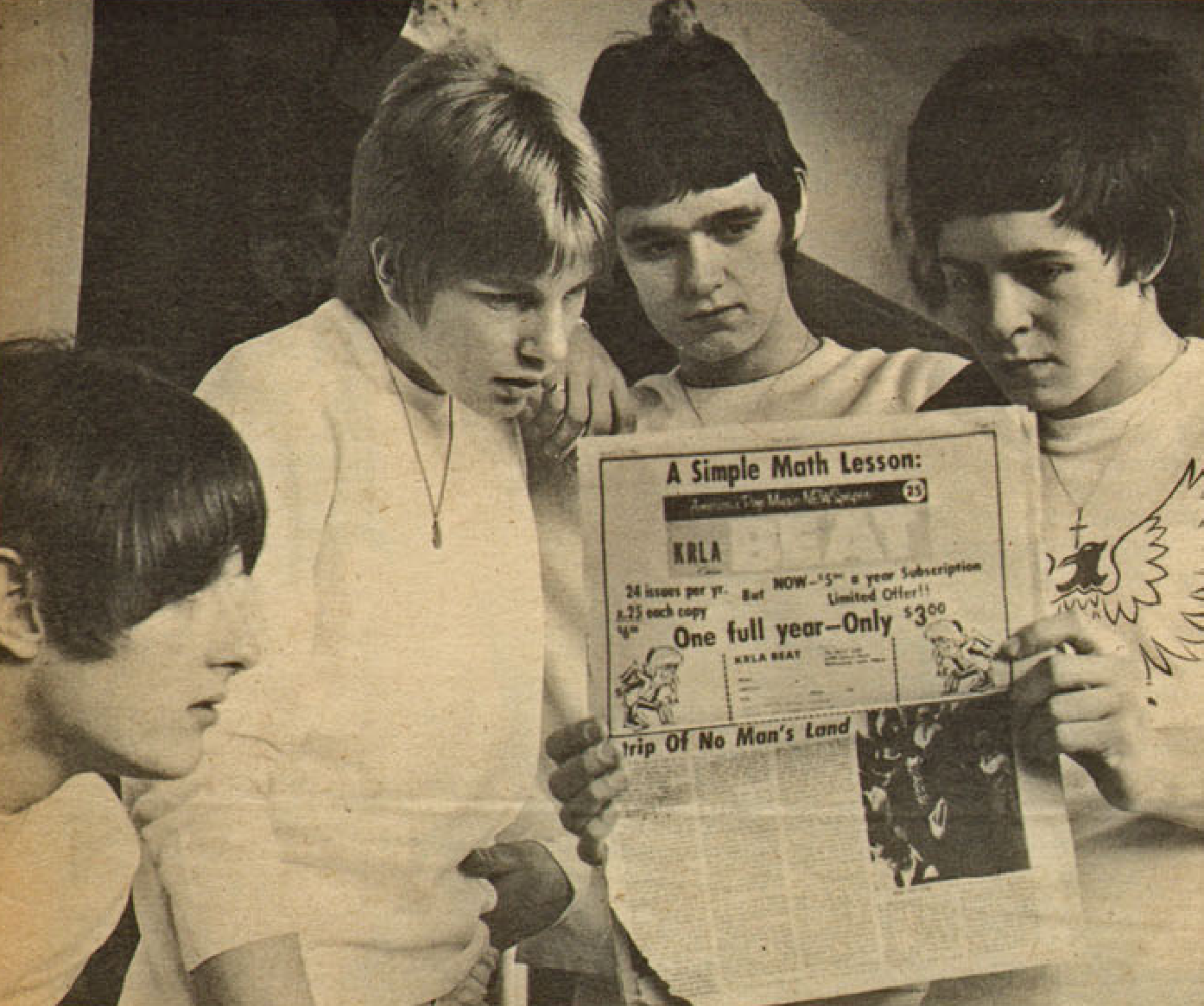
Bolan (far right) with John's Children in 1967

In 1966, Bolan turned up at Simon Napier-Bell's front door with his guitar and proclaimed that he was going to be a big star and he needed someone to make all of the arrangements. Napier-Bell invited Bolan in and listened to his songs. A recording session was immediately booked and the songs were very simply recorded (most of them were not actually released until 1974, on the album The Beginning of Doves). Only "Hippy Gumbo", a sinister-sounding, baroque folk-song, was released at the time as Bolan's third unsuccessful single. One song, "You Scare Me to Death", was used in a toothpaste advertisement. Some of the songs also resurfaced in 1982, with additional instrumentation added, on the album You Scare Me to Death. Napier-Bell managed the Yardbirds and John's Children and was at first going to slot Bolan into the Yardbirds. In early 1967, he eventually settled instead for John's Children because they needed a songwriter and he admired Bolan's writing ability. The band achieved some success as a live act but sold few records. A John's Children single written by Bolan called "Desdemona" was banned by the BBC for its line "lift up your skirt and fly".

His tenure with the band was brief. Following an ill-fated German tour with the Who, Bolan took some time to reassess his situation. Bolan's imagination was filled with new ideas and he began to write fantasy novels (The Krakenmist and Pictures Of Purple People) as well as poems and songs, sometimes finding it hard to separate facts from his own elaborate myth – he famously claimed to have spent time with a wizard in Paris who gave him secret knowledge and could levitate. The time spent with him was often alluded to but remained "mythical". In reality the wizard was probably American actor Riggs O'Hara with whom Bolan made a trip to Paris in 1965. Given time to reinvent himself, after John's Children, Bolan's songwriting took off and he began writing many of the poetic and neo-romantic songs that appeared on his first albums with T. Rex.

=== 1967–1970: Tyrannosaurus Rex ===
Bolan left John's Children when, among other problems, the band's equipment had been repossessed by their label Track Records. Unperturbed, he rallied to create Tyrannosaurus Rex, his own rock band together with guitarist Ben Cartland, drummer Steve Peregrin Took and an unknown bass player. Napier-Bell recalled of Bolan: "He got a gig at the Electric Garden then put an ad in Melody Maker to get the musicians. The paper came out on Wednesday, the day of the gig. At three o'clock he was interviewing musicians, at five he was getting ready to go on stage.... It was a disaster. He just got booed off the stage." Following this concert, Bolan pared the band down to just himself and Took, and they continued as a psychedelic-folk rock acoustic duo, playing Bolan's songs, with Took playing assorted hand and kit percussion and occasional bass to Bolan's acoustic guitars and voice. Napier-Bell said of Bolan that after the first disastrous electric gig: "He didn't have the courage to try it again; it really had been a blow to his ego... Later he told everyone he'd been forced into going acoustic because Track Records had repossessed all his gear. In fact he'd been forced to go acoustic because he was scared to do anything else."

The original version of Tyrannosaurus Rex with Took released three albums; two reached the top fifteen in the UK Albums Chart. They also had a top 40 hit "Debora" in 1968. They were supported with airplay by BBC Radio 1 DJ John Peel. One of the highlights of this era was when the duo played at the first free Hyde Park concert in 1968. Although the free-spirited, drug-taking Took was fired from the group after their first American tour, they were a force within the hippie underground scene while they lasted. Their music was filled with Bolan's otherworldly poetry. In 1969, Bolan published his first and only book of poetry entitled The Warlock of Love. Although some critics dismissed it as self-indulgence, it was full of Bolan's florid prose and wordplay, selling 40,000 copies and in 1969–70 became one of Britain's best-selling books of poetry. It was reprinted in 1992 by the Tyrannosaurus Rex Appreciation Society.

In keeping with his early rock and roll interests, Bolan began bringing amplified guitar lines into the duo's music, buying a white Fender Stratocaster decorated with a paisley teardrop motif from Syd Barrett. After replacing Took with Mickey Finn, he let the electric influences come forward even further on A Beard of Stars, the final album to be credited to Tyrannosaurus Rex. It closed with the song "Elemental Child", featuring a long electric guitar break influenced by Jimi Hendrix.

In September of 1970, the new line up of Tyrannosaurus Rex became headliners at the first Glastonbury Festival after The Kinks pulled out at the last minute. Co-creator of the festival, Michael Eavis, was close to cancelling the concert when he heard that Tyrannosaurus Rex would be playing a gig at Butlin's in Minehead that weekend. Despite Bolan agreeing for his group to replace The Kinks as headliners, and their sunset gig later being described as an inspiration for Glastonbury, Eavis could not afford to pay them at the time. He ultimately made and fulfilled an agreement to pay the group £100 per month, over a 5-month period, from profits made selling cow's milk.

=== 1971–1975: T. Rex, glam rock and other styles ===
Marc Bolan, the pixie prince of glam rock, remains a huge influence in music and fashion.

— Adam Sweeting, The Telegraph.

Becoming more adventurous musically, Bolan bought a modified vintage Gibson Les Paul guitar (featured on the cover of the album T. Rex), and then wrote and recorded his first hit "Ride a White Swan", which was dominated by a rolling hand-clapping back-beat, Bolan's electric guitar and Finn's percussion. At this time he also shortened the group's name to T. Rex. Bolan and his producer Tony Visconti oversaw the session for "Ride a White Swan", the single that changed Bolan's career which was inspired in part by Mungo Jerry's success with "In the Summertime", moving Bolan away from predominantly acoustic numbers to a more electric sound. Recorded on 1 July 1970 and released later that year, it made slow progress in the UK Top 40, until it finally peaked in early 1971 at number two. Inspired by his muse, June Child, Bolan developed a fascination with women's clothing, an unlikely characteristic for a British male rocker at the time.

Bolan followed "Ride a White Swan" and T. Rex by expanding the group to a quartet with bassist Steve Currie and drummer Bill Legend, and cutting a five-minute single, "Hot Love", with a rollicking rhythm, string accents and an extended sing-along chorus inspired somewhat by "Hey Jude". Bolan performed "Hot Love" on the BBC television show Top of the Pops wearing glitter on his face: the performance was later recognized as the foundation of glam rock. For the viewers, it was a defining moment: "Bolan was magical, but also sexually heightened and androgynous". The song was number one in the UK Singles Chart for six weeks and was quickly followed by "Get It On", a grittier, more adult tune that spent four weeks in the top spot. The song, re-titled "Bang a Gong (Get It On)" when released in the US, reached No. 10 in the Billboard Hot 100 in early 1972.

Dressed in a satin sailor suit, but also – and most importantly – with the glittery gold teardrops beneath his eyes. This performance is often acknowledged as the birth of glam. His androgynous style has been an enduring influence on fashion. From Gucci to Saint Laurent, fashion has long drawn inspiration from his style. He knew how to subvert gender norms into fantastical new shapes.

— Joobin Bekhrad, The Guardian, on Bolan's March 1971 appearance on Top of the Pops.

In November 1971, the band's record label, Fly, released the Electric Warrior track "Jeepster" without Bolan's permission. Outraged, Bolan took advantage of the timely lapsing of his Fly Records contract and left for EMI, who gave him his own record label, the T. Rex Wax Co. Its bag and label featured a head-and-shoulders image of Bolan. Despite the lack of Bolan's endorsement, "Jeepster" peaked at number two in the UK Singles Chart. Regarded as one of the band's best songs, Paste and Billboard ranked it number one and three on their lists of the top 10 T. Rex songs.

In 1972, he achieved two more UK number ones with "Telegram Sam" and "Metal Guru" taken from The Slider, and two number twos in "Children of the Revolution" and "Solid Gold Easy Action". In the same year he appeared in Born to Boogie, a documentary by Ringo Starr about T. Rex including a concert filmed at London's Wembley Empire Pool in March 1972. Mixed in were surreal scenes shot at John Lennon's mansion in Ascot and a session with T. Rex joined by Ringo Starr on a second drum kit and Elton John on piano. At this time T. Rex record sales accounted for about six per cent of total British domestic record sales. The band was reportedly selling 100,000 records a day; however, no T. Rex single ever became a million-seller in the UK, despite many gold discs and an average of four weeks at the top per number one hit. No T. Rex record was certified until 1985, as the record company had to pay for it, which Bolan's did not in the 1970s.

Bolan took to wearing top hats and feather boas on stage as well as putting drops of glitter on each of his cheekbones. Stories are conflicting about his inspiration for this – some say it was introduced by his personal assistant, Chelita Secunda, although Bolan told John Pidgeon in a 1974 interview on Radio 1 that he noticed the glitter on his wife, June Child's dressing table prior to a photo session and casually daubed some on his face there and then. Other performers – and their fans – soon took up variations on the idea.

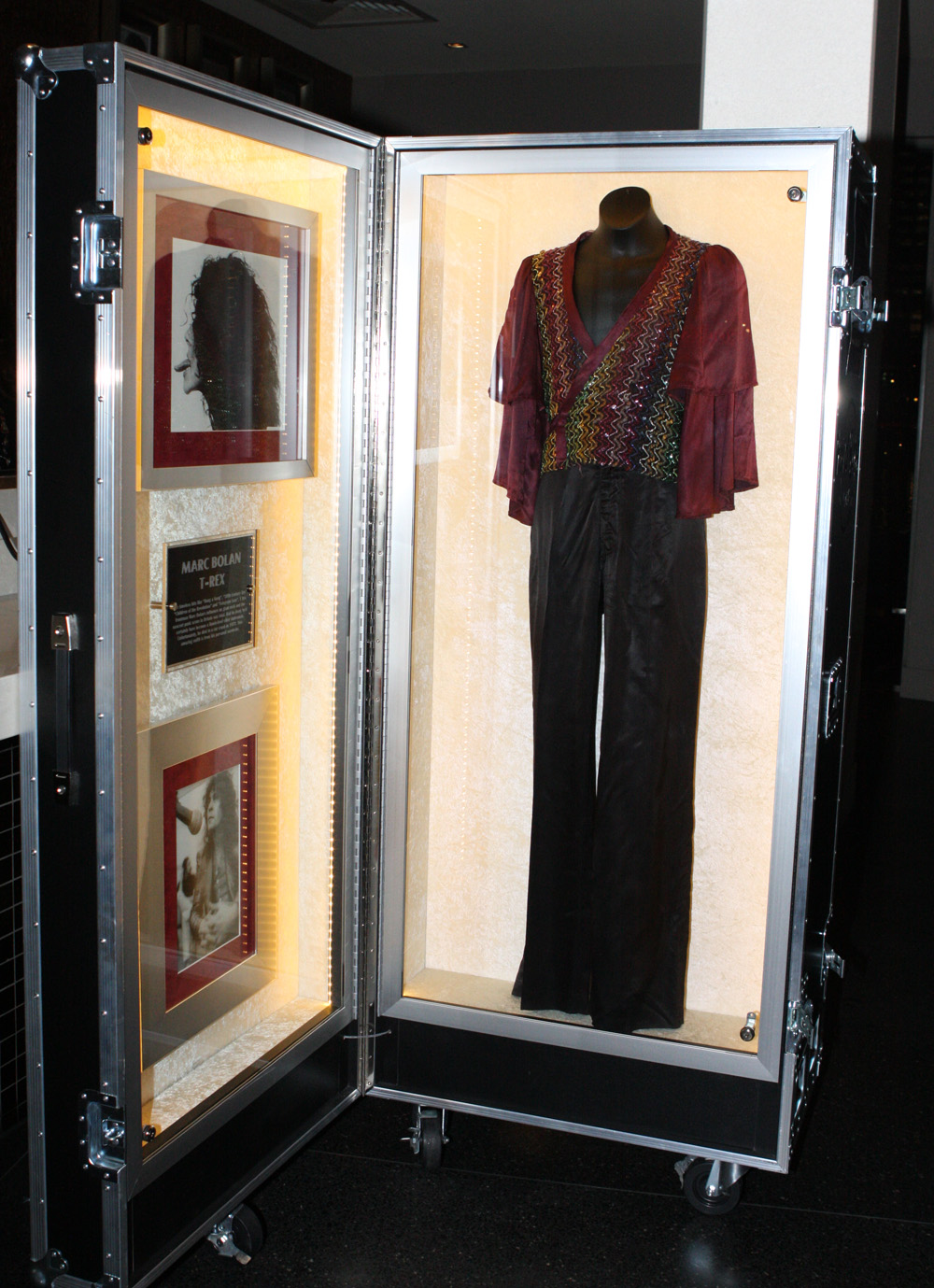
An outfit of Marc Bolan's on display at the Hard Rock Cafe in Sydney, Australia

The glam era also saw the rise of Bolan's friend David Bowie, whom Bolan had come to know in the underground days (Bolan had played guitar on Bowie's 1970 single "Prettiest Star"; Bolan and Bowie also shared the same manager, Les Conn, and producer, Tony Visconti) but their friendship was also a rivalry, which continued throughout his career. Bowie's 1972 song "All the Young Dudes" name-checked T. Rex. Bowie's song "Lady Stardust" is generally interpreted as alluding to fellow glam rock icon Bolan. The original demo version was entitled "He Was Alright (A Song for Marc)".

In 1973, Bolan played twin lead guitar alongside his friend Jeff Lynne on the Electric Light Orchestra songs "Ma-Ma-Ma Belle" and "Dreaming of 4000" (originally uncredited) from On the Third Day, as well as on "Everyone's Born to Die", which was not released at the time but appears as a bonus track on the 2006 remaster.

For the following recording sessions, he recruited soul female singers for the backing vocals on "20th Century Boy", which peaked at number 3 in March, and mid-year "The Groover" which went to number four. Tanx, parts of which found him heading towards soul, funk and gospel, was both a commercial and critical success in several European countries. "Truck On (Tyke)" missed the UK top 10 reaching only No. 12 in December. However, "Teenage Dream" from the 1974 album Zinc Alloy and the Hidden Riders of Tomorrow showed that Bolan was attempting to create richer, more involved music than he had previously attempted with T. Rex. He expanded the line up of the band to include a second guitarist, Jack Green, and other studio musicians, and began to take more control over the sound and production of his records, including by then girlfriend Gloria Jones on keyboards as well as backing vocals.

Eventually, the vintage T. Rex line-up disintegrated. Bolan's marriage came to an end because of his affair with backing singer Jones, which began in July 1973. He spent a good deal of his time in the US during this period, continuing to release singles and albums, putting R & B influences with rock on Bolan's Zip Gun.

=== 1976–1977: resurgence and final year ===
In September 1975, Gloria Jones gave birth to Bolan's son, whom they named Rolan Bolan (although his birth certificate lists him as 'Rolan Seymour Feld'). That same year, Bolan returned to the UK from tax exile in the US and Monaco and to the public eye with a low-key tour. Bolan made regular appearances on the LWT pop show Supersonic, directed by his old friend Mike Mansfield and released a succession of singles, including "New York City" which peaked at number 15. By then, Bolan was current with the music scene, incorporating disco elements in Futuristic Dragon and the single "Dreamy Lady". In June 1976, Bolan released "I Love to Boogie", which peaked at number 13. The last remaining member of Bolan's halcyon era T. Rex, Currie, left the group in late 1976. In early 1977, Bolan got a new band together, released a new album, Dandy in the Underworld, and set out on a fresh UK tour, taking along punk band the Damned as support to entice a young audience who did not remember his heyday barely five years previously.

Later in August 1977, one month before his death, Granada Television commissioned Bolan to front a six-part series called Marc in which he hosted a mix of new and established bands and performed his own songs. By this time Bolan had lost weight, appearing as trim as he had during T. Rex's earlier heyday. The show was broadcast during the post-school half-hour on ITV earmarked for children and teenagers and it was a big success. One episode reunited Bolan with his former John's Children bandmate Andy Ellison, then fronting the band Radio Stars.

Bolan's longtime friend and sometimes rival David Bowie was the final guest on the last episode of Marc. Bowie's solo song "'Heroes'" was the show's penultimate song; Bolan signed off, naming some of the musicians: "All the cats; you know who they are"; they then began to play a bluesy song, over the closing credits. After four words of Bowie's vocals, however, Bolan stumbled forward, and off the stage, but managed to grab the microphone, and find a smile. Bowie's amusement was clearly visible, and the band stopped playing after a few seconds. With no time for a retake, the occurrence was aired.

== Personal life ==
Bolan began his first serious romantic relationship, with Teresa Whipman, in 1965. They broke up in 1968 when Bolan met June Ellen Child. The pair immediately fell in love and moved into a flat together after knowing each other for only a few days. They married on 30 January 1970. She was a former secretary to his then managers, Blackhill Enterprises, also the managers of another of his heroes, Syd Barrett, who June had previously dated. She was also influential in raising her new husband's profile in the music industry. Bolan's relationship with June was tumultuous; he engaged in several affairs over the course of their marriage, including one with singer Marsha Hunt in 1969, and another with artist Barbara Nessim while recording in America in 1971. The couple separated in 1973, after June found out about Bolan's affair with his backing singer Gloria Jones. After Bolan's death, June revealed that she had abortions during their marriage because she believed Bolan was not mature enough to be a father.

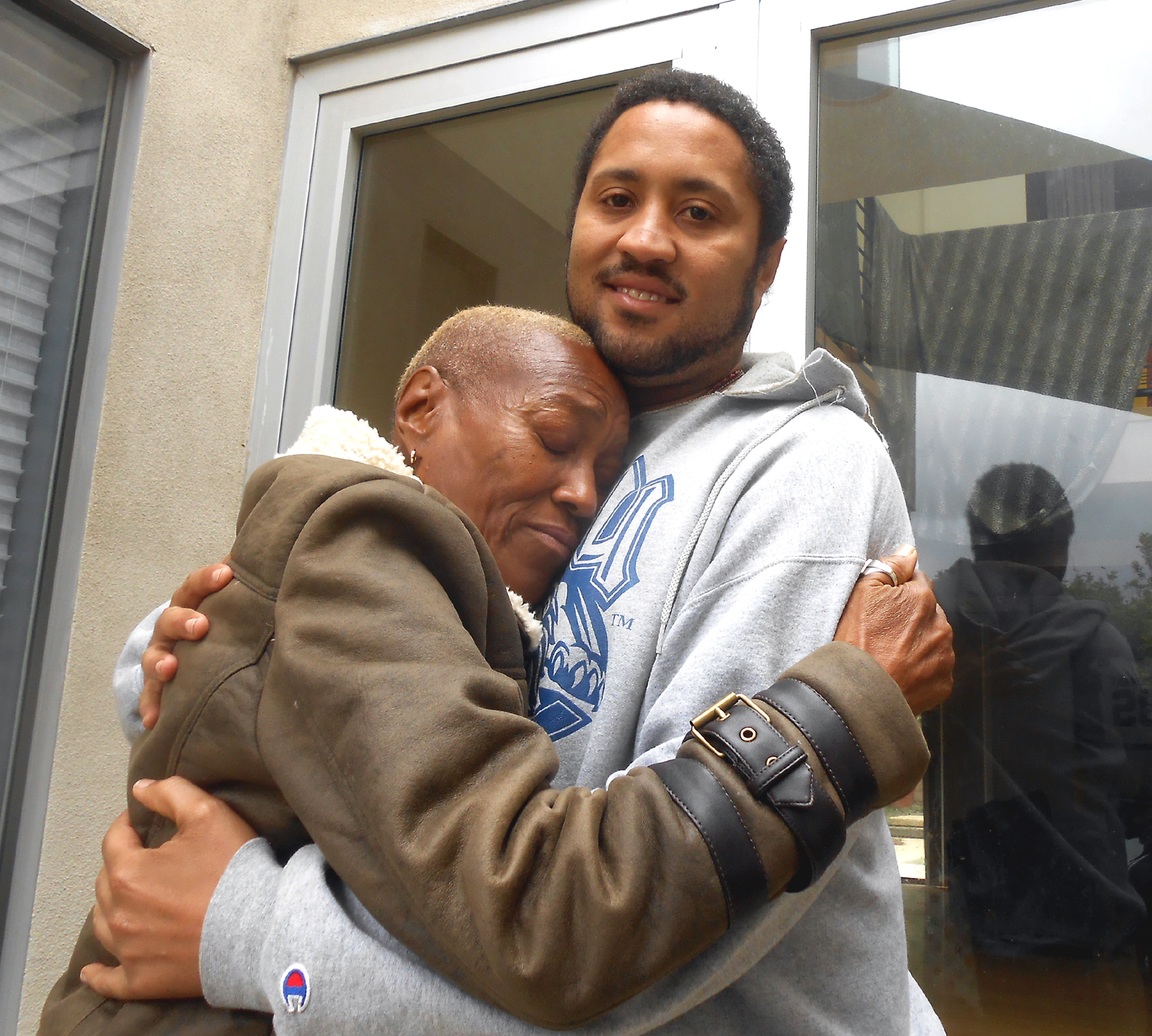
Gloria Jones with her and Marc Bolan's son Rolan in 2014

Bolan and Gloria Jones were in a romantic relationship from 1973 until his death in September 1977. The couple had a son together in September 1975 and the three of them lived together for nearly two years until Bolan's death. At the end of June 1976, June Bolan sued for divorce on the grounds of adultery, citing Gloria Jones as the third party. At the court hearing on 5 October 1976, Deputy Judge Donald Ellison declared: "I am satisfied that the husband committed adultery with the co-respondent, and that the wife finds it intolerable to live with him" and granted a decree nisi. Twelve months after that date, it was to become a decree absolute, thus severing the Bolans' matrimonial ties. "The facts are that she initially left me, and we just grew apart", Bolan explained after the ruling. "There were no great scenes, no smashing things up. It just suddenly happened one day. We weren't a couple anymore." He also used the opportunity to shed a little light on his sexuality. "Anyway, I'm gay", he only half-jested. "I can't say I was a latent homosexual – I was an early one. But sex was never a great problem. I'm a great screwer." Asked about the institution of marriage, he replied: "Gloria doesn't want to get married and neither do I. If I ever marry anyone again, I'll put in a clause that when it ends you're on your own – and that means financially, too." During an interview in 1975, Bolan was also asked about his sexuality, and said that he was bisexual.

Bolan never learned to drive, fearing he would die before reaching 30 years old. Despite this fear, cars or automotive components are at least mentioned in, if not the subject of, many of his songs. He also owned a number of vehicles, including a white 1960s Rolls-Royce that was loaned by his management to the band Hawkwind on the night of his death.

== Death ==
On Friday 16 September 1977, two weeks before his 30th birthday, Bolan was a passenger in a purple Mini 1275GT driven by Gloria Jones as they headed home from a party hosted by Rod Stewart at Morton's Club Restaurant in Berkeley Square, London. Both had been drinking alcohol, and after crossing a small humpback bridge near Gipsy Lane on Queens Ride, Barnes, south west London, the car struck a fence post and then a sycamore tree. Bolan died at the scene. Jones was critically injured, suffering a broken jaw and arm. She was not informed about Bolan's death until the day of his funeral.

The car crash site has become a shrine to his memory, where fans leave tributes beside the tree. In 2013, the shrine was featured on the BBC Four series Pagans and Pilgrims: Britain's Holiest Places. The site, Marc Bolan's Rock Shrine, is owned and maintained by the T. Rex Action Group.

His funeral service was held on 20 September 1977 at the Golders Green Crematorium in North London. Bolan's ashes were later buried under a rose bush. Bolan's funeral was attended by David Bowie, Rod Stewart, Tony Visconti and Steve Harley among other musicians. Bolan had arranged a discretionary trust to safeguard his money. A small, separate Jersey-based trust fund has allowed his son to receive some income. However, the bulk of Bolan's fortune, variously estimated at between £20 and £30 million, remains in trust.

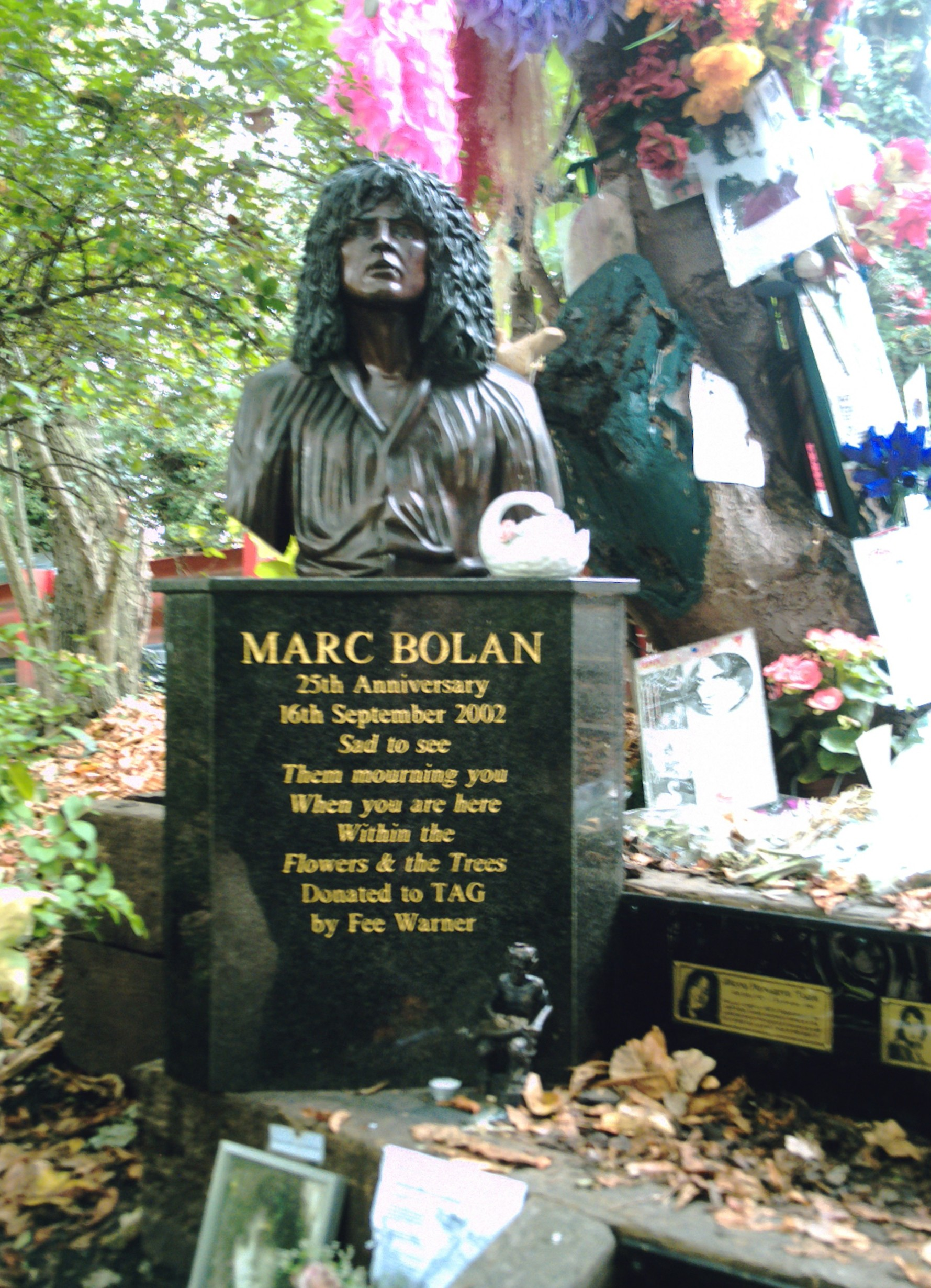
Marc Bolan's Rock Shrine at the site where he died in a car crash in Barnes, London on 16 September 1977, two weeks shy of what would have been his 30th birthday.

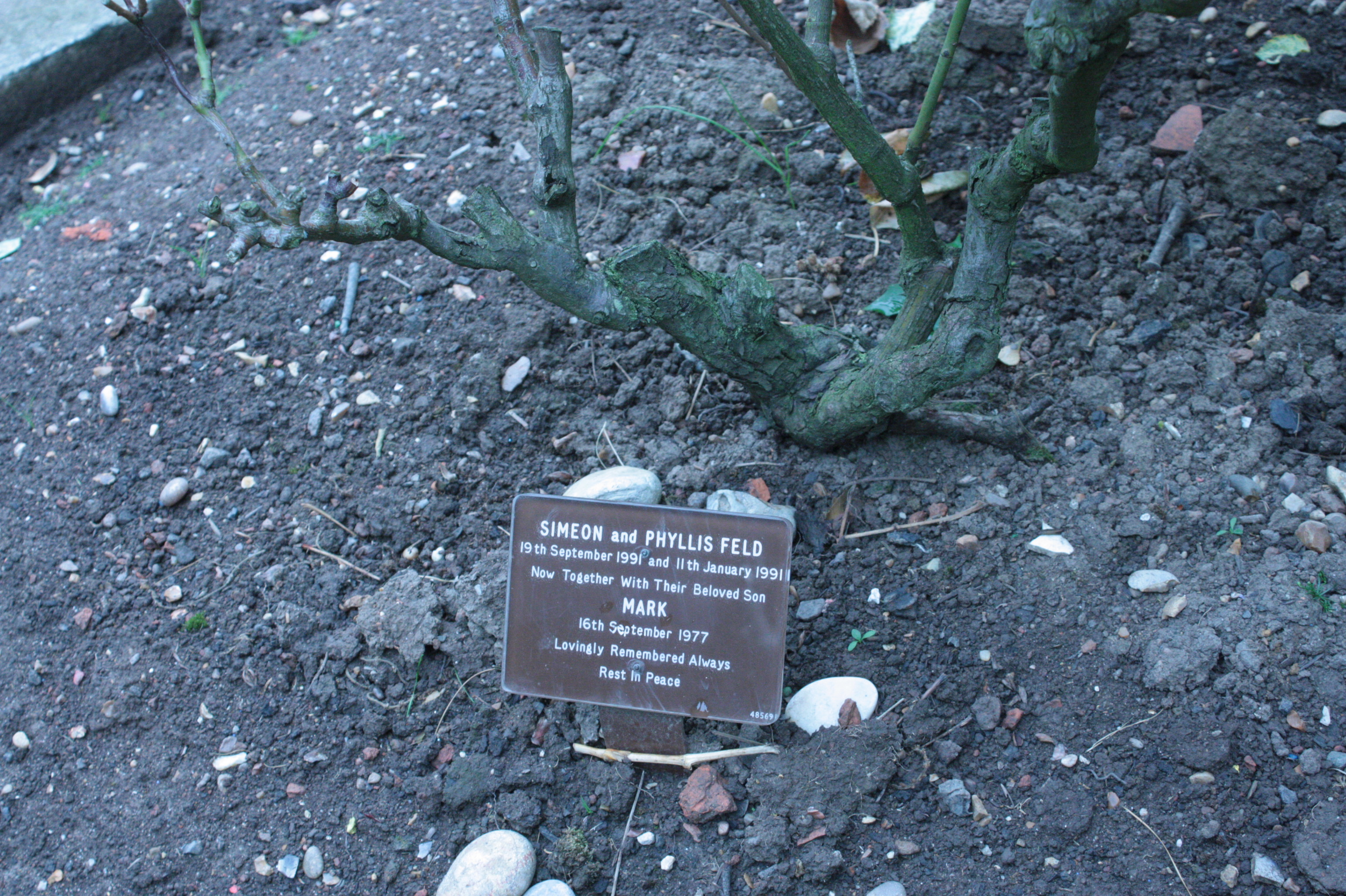
Marker for the ashes of Mark Feld (Marc Bolan) and his parents, Golders Green Crematorium

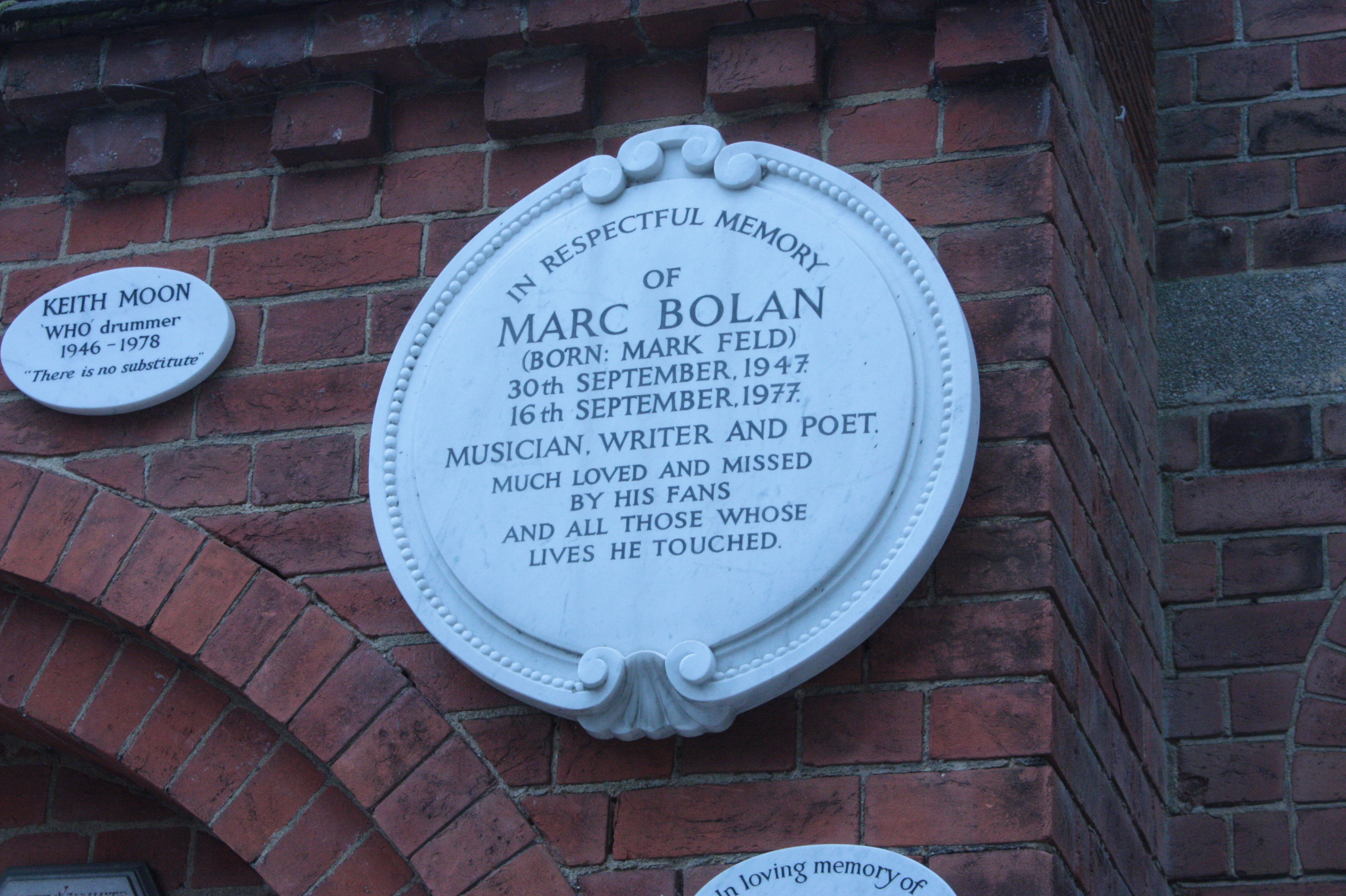
Memorial plaque to Bolan, Golders Green Crematorium

== Legacy ==
Bolan influenced artists especially in the genres of glam rock, punk, post-punk, new wave, indie rock, Britpop and alternative rock. After seeing Bolan wearing Zandra Rhodes-designed outfits, Freddie Mercury enlisted Rhodes to design costumes for the next Queen tour in 1974. Bolan was the early guitar idol of Johnny Marr, who later found fame as the guitarist of the influential indie rock band the Smiths. Emerging in the New Romantic movement in the early 1980s, Boy George spoke of the impact Bolan and Bowie had on him: "They represented a kind of bohemian existence that I – at that point – could only imagine living. I loved the music. The first time I ever saw Marc Bolan really, properly was singing 'Metal Guru' and just loved him. I don't think you can separate an artist from what they wear or what they sing – it's kind of the complete package."

The T. Rex singer captivated generations with his strutting music and hyper-sexual charisma.

— Alexis Petridis in The Guardian on "glam's greatest icon".

The 1973 album Still by former King Crimson lyricist Peter Sinfield mentions Bolan in the title track: "Beatles and Bolans, raindrops and oceans". In 1980, the Bongos were the first American group, with "Mambo Sun", to enter the Billboard charts with a T. Rex cover. Since then, Bongos frontman Richard Barone has recorded several other Bolan compositions ("The Visit", "Ballrooms of Mars"), worked with T. Rex producer Tony Visconti for his 2010 solo album, Glow, that includes a remake of Bolan's "Girl" from Electric Warrior, and has himself produced tracks for Bolan's son Rolan.

In 1985, supergroup The Power Station, with Robert Palmer as vocalist, took a version of "Get It On" into the UK Top 40 and to US No. 6, the first cover of a Bolan song to enter the charts since his death. They also performed the tune (with Michael Des Barres replacing Palmer) at the Live Aid concert. In 1986, Violent Femmes covered the song "Children of the Revolution" on their album, The Blind Leading the Naked. In 1991, Japanese rock band T-Bolan were named after T. Rex and Bolan.

It felt like he actually cast a spell. I've no doubt every aspect of how he presented himself was just an outpouring of his understanding that things could be magical, things could be heightened. Out in the ordinary world, he managed to cast a spell over all of us.

— U2 guitarist The Edge on Bolan after watching him on the BBC's Top of the Pops in March 1971.

"20th Century Boy" introduced a new generation of devotees to Bolan's work in 1991 when it was featured on a Levi's jeans TV commercial featuring Brad Pitt, and was re-released, reaching No. 13 in the UK. The song was performed by the fictional band the Flaming Creatures (performed by Placebo, reprised by Placebo and David Bowie at the 1999 Brit Awards) in the 1998 film Velvet Goldmine. In every decade since his death, a Bolan greatest hits compilation has placed in the top 20 UK albums and periodic boosts in sales have come via cover versions from artists inspired by Bolan, including Morrissey. In 1991, Morrissey and David Bowie performed a duet of "Cosmic Dancer" at the Inglewood Forum in Los Angeles.

The Cameron Crowe-created movie Almost Famous features a scene in which a Black Sabbath groupie is telling aspiring journalist William Miller about how "Marc Bolan broke her heart, man. It's famous", regarding the character of Penny Lane, played by Kate Hudson. In 2000, Naoki Urasawa created a Japanese manga entitled 20th Century Boys that was inspired by Marc Bolan's song "20th Century Boy". The series is a multiple award-winner, and has also been released in North America. The story was adopted into three successful live-action movies from 2008 to 2009, which were also released in the US, Canada and the UK.

In 2020, Kesha recorded a cover of "Children of the Revolution" along with Marc Bolan's son, Rolan Bolan, on backing vocals.

In 2007, the English Tourist Board included Bolan's Rock Shrine in their guide to Important Sites of Rock 'n Roll interest 'England Rocks'. As reported in 2011, a school is planned in his honour, to be built in Sierra Leone: The Marc Bolan School of Music and Film. A musical, 20th Century Boy, based on Bolan's life, and featuring his music, premiered at the New Wolsey Theatre in Ipswich in 2011.

In September 2020, a tribute album produced by Hal Willner, Angelheaded Hipster, was released featuring covers of Bolan songs by a variety of artists including Nick Cave, U2, Elton John, Joan Jett, Nena and Todd Rundgren. Two months later, Bolan and T. Rex bandmates Steve Currie, Mickey Finn and Bill Legend were inducted into the Rock and Roll Hall of Fame as part of the class of 2020 by Beatles drummer Ringo Starr.

In September 2025, an English Heritage blue plaque was unveiled on the site of Bolan's home in Maida Vale, west London, where he had lived from 1970 to 1972. The unveiling ceremony was attended by the Damned's Rat Scabies and Captain Sensible, Primal Scream's Bobby Gillespie, and Rick Wakeman from the band Yes.

== Discography ==
See T. Rex discography for full details of releases by Tyrannosaurus Rex and T. Rex. Solo releases and other releases are listed below.

=== Albums ===
with John's Children

- The Legendary Orgasm Album (1982)
- Smashed Blocked! (1997)

as Marc Bolan

- The Beginning of Doves (1974)
- You Scare Me to Death (1981)
- Dance in the Midnight (1983)
- Observations (1992)

with Tyrannosaurus Rex

- My People Were Fair and Had Sky in Their Hair... But Now They're Content to Wear Stars on Their Brows (1968)
- Prophets, Seers & Sages: The Angels of the Ages (1968)
- Unicorn (1969)
- A Beard of Stars (1970)

with T. Rex

- T. Rex (1970)
- Electric Warrior (1971)
- The Slider (1972)
- Tanx (1973)
- Zinc Alloy and the Hidden Riders of Tomorrow (1974)
- Bolan's Zip Gun (1975)
- Futuristic Dragon (1976)
- Dandy in the Underworld (1977)
- Billy Super Duper (1982)

=== Singles ===
as Marc Bolan

- 1965 "The Wizard / Beyond the Rising Sun"
- 1966 "The Third Degree / San Francisco Poet"
- 1967 "Hippy Gumbo / Misfit"

with John's Children

- 1967 "Desdemona / Remember Thomas A Beckett"

with Tyrannosaurus Rex

- 1968 "Debora / Child Star"
- 1968 "One Inch Rock / Salamanda Palaganda"
- 1969 "Pewter Suitor/Warlord of the Royal Crocodiles"
- 1969 "King of the Rumbling Spires / Do You Remember"
- 1970 "By the Light of a Magical Moon / Find a Little Wood"

T. Rex

- 1970 "Ride a White Swan / Is It Love / Summertime Blues"
- 1971 "Hot Love / The King of the Mountain Cometh / Woodland Rock"
- 1971 "Get It On (Bang a Gong) / Raw Ramp"
- 1971 "Jeepster / Life's a Gas"
- 1972 "Telegram Sam / Cadilac / Baby Strange"
- 1972 "Metal Guru / Thunderwing / Lady"
- 1972 "The Slider / Chariot Choogle" (not officially released, however, some copies exist)
- 1972 "Debora / One Inch Rock / Woodland Bop / The Seal of Seasons" (re-issued)(MagniFly EP)"
- 1972 "Children of the Revolution / Jitterbug Love / Sunken Rags"
- 1972 "Solid Gold Easy Action / Born to Boogie"
- 1973 "20th Century Boy / Free Angel"
- 1973 "The Groover / Midnight"
- 1973 "Truck On (Tyke) / Sitting Here"
- 1973 "Blackjack / Squint Eye Mangle" as Big Carrot
- 1974 "Teenage Dream / Satisfaction Pony"
- 1974 "Light of Love / Explosive Mouth"
- 1974 "Zip Gun Boogie / Space Boss"
- 1975 "New York City / Chrome Sitar"
- 1975 "Dreamy Lady / Do You Wanna Dance/Dock of the Bay"
- 1975 "Christmas Bop / Telegram Sam / Metal Guru" (not released, however, some paper labels exist)
- 1976 "London Boys / Solid Baby"
- 1976 "I Love to Boogie / Baby Boomerang"
- 1976 "Laser Love / Life's An Elevator"
- 1977 "The Soul of My Suit / All Alone"
- 1977 "Dandy in the Underworld / Groove a Little / Tame My Tiger"
- 1977 "To Know You Is to Love You / City Port"
- 1977 "Celebrate Summer / Ride My Wheels"
- 1977 "Ride a White Swan / The Motivator / Jeepster / Demon Queen"
- 1977 "Get It On / Hot Love" (re-issued)
- 1978 "Hot Love / Raw Ramp / Lean Woman Blues"
- 1978 "Crimson Moon / Jason B. Sad"
- 1978 "You Scare Me to Death / The Perfumed Garden of Gulliver Smith"

== Bibliography ==
- Bolan, Marc. The Warlock Of Love, Lupus Publishing: 1969.
- Tremlett, George. The Marc Bolan Story, Futura: 1975, ISBN 9780860070689
- Willans, Caron & John - ‘Wilderness of the Mind - Marc Bolan’ Xanadu Publications 1991
- Sinclair, Paul. Electric Warrior: The Marc Bolan Story, Omnibus Press: 1982, ISBN 978-0711900547
- Du Noyer, Paul. Marc Bolan: Virgin Modern Icons, Virgin Books: 1997, ISBN 978-1852276836
- McLenehan, Cliff. Marc Bolan: A Chronology 1947-1977, Helter Skelter Publishing: 2002, ISBN 978-1900924429
- Paytress, Mark. Bolan: The Rise and Fall of a 20th Century Superstar, Omnibus Press: 2003, ISBN 978-1846091476
- Ewens, Carl. Born To Boogie: The Songwriting Of Marc Bolan, Aureus Publishing: 2007, ISBN 978-1899750399
- Roland, Paul. Cosmic Dancer: The Life & Music of Marc Bolan. Tomahawk Press. 2012, ISBN 978-0956683403
- Jones, Lesley-Ann. Ride a White Swan: The Lives and Death of Marc Bolan. Hodder 2013, ISBN 978-1444758795
- Bramley, John. Marc Bolan: Beautiful Dreamer. John Blake Publishing Ltd. 2017, ISBN 978-1786064486
