= New York City (T. Rex song) =

Single by T. Rex

from the album Futuristic Dragon
- B-side: "Chrome Sitar (UK)"
- Released: 27 June 1975
- Genre: Glam rock
- Length: 3:58
- Label: EMI (UK)
- Songwriter: Marc Bolan
- Producer: Marc Bolan

T. Rex singles chronology
"Zip Gun Boogie" (1975)	"New York City" (1975)	"Dreamy Lady" (1975)

"New York City" is a 1975 single by the British glam rock band T. Rex. The track and its B-side "Chrome Sitar", are taken from the 1976 album Futuristic Dragon. The song consists of a couple of lines of lyric, "Did you ever see a woman coming out of New York City/With a frog in her hand?" and "I did don't you know/And don't it show?" repeated over a bass line.

The single was released on 27 June 1975, and was in the UK Singles Chart for a total of eight weeks, peaking at number 15.

In some countries, the B-side was "Solid Baby" taken from the previous album Bolan's Zip Gun.
