= I Love to Boogie =

- 7" single cover

Single by T. Rex

from the album Dandy in the Underworld
- B-side: "Baby Boomerang"
- Released: 11 June 1976
- Recorded: May 1976
- Genre: Glam rock; rock and roll
- Length: 2:16
- Label: EMI
- Songwriter: Marc Bolan
- Producer: Marc Bolan

T. Rex singles chronology
"London Boys" (1976)	"I Love to Boogie" (1976)	"Laser Love" (1976)

Official audio
- "I Love to Boogie" on YouTube

"I Love to Boogie" is a song by English rock band T. Rex. It was recorded in May 1976 and released as a single in June by record label EMI. It later appeared on T. Rex's final studio album, 1977's Dandy in the Underworld. Its B-side, "Baby Boomerang", was taken from an earlier T. Rex album, The Slider (1972).

== Recording ==
"I Love to Boogie" was recorded and mixed in a single day by engineer Ian Maidman at Decibel Studio in Stamford Hill, London.

== Release ==
"I Love to Boogie" was released as a single on 11 June 1976 by record label EMI. It later appeared on T. Rex's final studio album, 1977's Dandy in the Underworld. The song was in the UK Singles Chart for a total of nine weeks, peaking at No. 13.

The song was released to controversy due to its resemblance to Webb Pierce's "Teenage Boogie", prompting rockabillies to attempt to burn copies of the single at an event held in a pub on the Old Kent Road, South East London. Disc jockey Geoff Barker complained that "The records are so alike it can't be a coincidence". When Pierce's publishers contacted Bolan's London office, Bolan's manager Tony Howard employed a musicologist to analyse both songs. The musicologist noted that "Teenage Boogie" was itself based on a riff that had been around long before the song was written.

"I Love to Boogie" is amongst T. Rex's best known and most popular hits.

== Certifications ==
Region	Certification	Certified units/sales
United Kingdom (BPI)	Gold	400,000^{‡}
^{‡} Sales+streaming figures based on certification alone.

== In popular culture ==
"I Love to Boogie" features in the 2000 film Billy Elliot, as the music for a dance routine with Julie Walters and Jamie Bell.

The song was also played in the 2005 French/British animated movie The Magic Roundabout, when Dougal (voiced by Robbie Williams) and his friends battle the evil ice wizard Zeebad (voiced by Tom Baker) by placing the three magic diamonds at the roundabout for unfreezing their home land.
