= List of John Mayall band members =

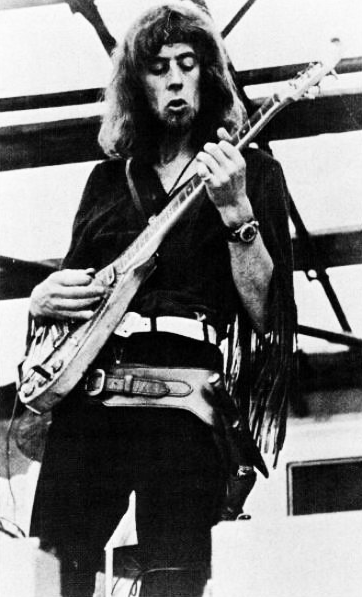
John Mayall in 1970.

John Mayall was an English blues rock musician. Originally from Macclesfield, he began his career in 1963 when he moved to London and formed John Mayall & the Bluesbreakers. The band's original lineup included Mayall on vocals, keyboards and harmonica, guitarist Bernie Watson, bassist John McVie and drummer Peter Ward. After changing personnel numerous times, the group disbanded in 1968 when Mayall relocated to the United States and continued his career using his own name. The final lineup of Mayall's solo band included bassist Greg Rzab, drummer Jay Davenport (both since 2009) and guitarist Carolyn Wonderland (since 2018).

== History ==
=== 1963–1968: The Bluesbreakers ===
Mayall formed the Bluesbreakers in February 1963. Early performers involved with the band included guitarists Sammy Prosser, Davey Graham and John Gilbey, bassists Ricky Brown and Pete Burford, and drummers Sam Stone, Brian Myall and Keith Robertson. The first official lineup of the group introduced in July included guitarist Bernie Watson, bassist John McVie and drummer Peter Ward. Martin Hart replaced Ward shortly after the band's formation. Shortly before the release of their first single, Watson and Hart were replaced by Roger Dean and Hughie Flint, respectively. A year later, Dean was replaced by Eric Clapton, who debuted with the group on 9 April 1965. By September, the guitarist had abruptly left to form a new band and tour Greece. Several substitutes filled in for Clapton, including John Weider, John Slaughter and Geoff Krivit, ending with Peter Green for around a week. Clapton returned in November. Meanwhile, McVie had been fired in October and replaced by Jack Bruce, who only stayed for around a month.

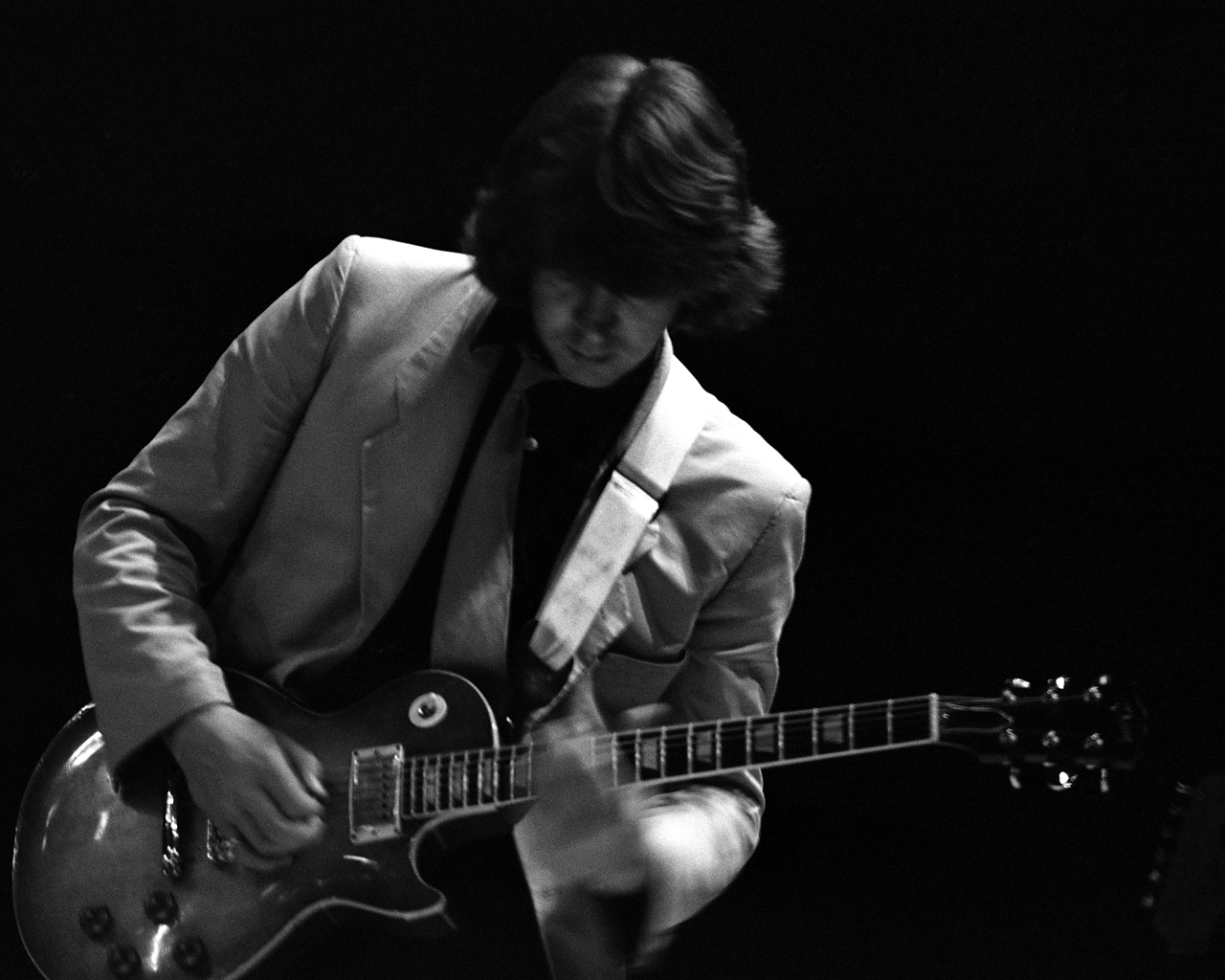
Mick Taylor was the third long-term guitarist in John Mayall's band.

Clapton remained until 17 July 1966, after forming Cream the previous day, and was replaced again by Green. Flint left the band in September, with Aynsley Dunbar taking his place. The drummer left in April 1967, when he was replaced by Micky Waller and later by Mick Fleetwood. Fleetwood was fired after two months, with Green following him to form Fleetwood Mac. McVie initially hesitated to join the pair, but did so in September. Green was replaced by Mick Taylor and Terry Edmonds, the latter of whom left after only a few weeks. Fleetwood was replaced by Keef Hartley. At the same time, Mayall expanded the group with the addition of saxophonists Chris Mercer and Rip Kant, the latter of whom was replaced by Dick Heckstall-Smith in August. McVie was initially replaced for a month by Paul Williams, and later by Keith Tillman. The group added a seventh member in February 1968, as trumpeter Henry Lowther joined the band.

After the band's first American tour in early 1968, Tillman was replaced for around a month by Andy Fraser. When the bassist joined Free, he was replaced in the Bluesbreakers by Tony Reeves; at the same time, Hartley left and was replaced by Jon Hiseman. This lineup recorded Bare Wires, which was the last studio album to bear the Bluesbreakers name. Soon after the album's release, Reeves, Hiseman and Heckstall-Smith left Mayall's band to form Colosseum, a progressive jazz-rock group. Mercer and Lowther also left, as Mayall disbanded the Bluesbreakers after just a few weeks of touring for Bare Wires. Mayall would subsequently relocate from London to Laurel Canyon, Los Angeles, California in August to continue his career as a solo artist, with Taylor joining him.

=== 1968–1981: Early solo career ===
Upon disbanding the Bluesbreakers and moving to the US, Mayall and Taylor recorded Blues from Laurel Canyon with bassist Steve Thompson and drummer Colin Allen. This lineup remained active for almost a year, until Taylor left to replace Brian Jones in The Rolling Stones on 5 June 1969. After the guitarist's departure, Mayall restructured his band to focus on more acoustic music; he replaced Taylor with Jon Mark, dropped Allen from the group, and added saxophonist Johnny Almond. Early the next year, he replaced Thompson with Alex Dmochowski and added Duster Bennett on harmonica. In August, Mark and Almond left to form the eponymous group Mark-Almond, and Mayall put together another lineup which included former Canned Heat members Harvey Mandel (guitar) and Larry Taylor (bass), as well as violinist Don "Sugarcane" Harris. From November 1970 to January 1971, Mayall recorded Back to the Roots with new drummer Paul Lagos and a range of former bandmates.

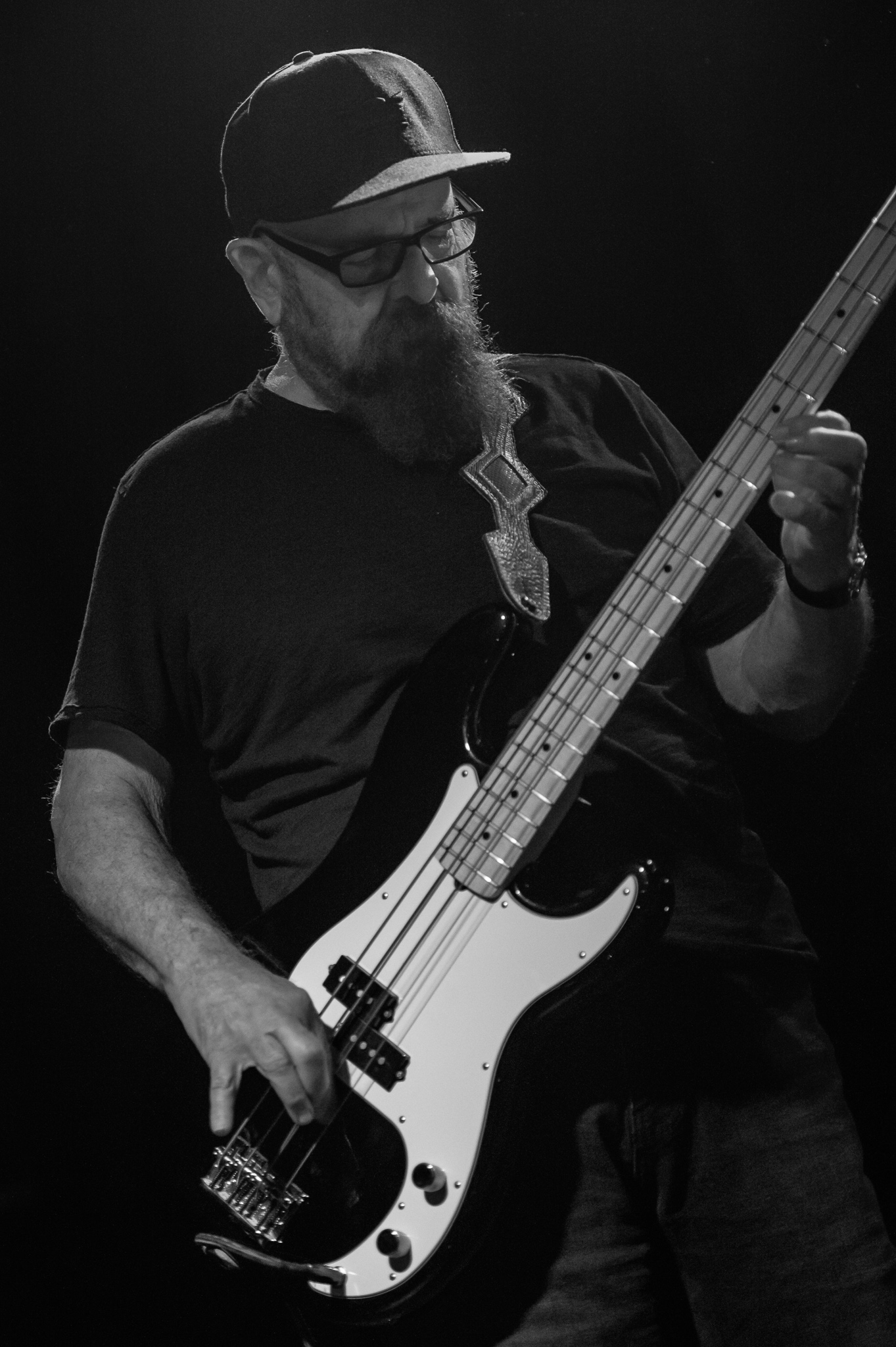
Larry Taylor had one of the longest tenures in Mayall's band in the 1970s.

Following the release of Back to the Roots, Mayall downsized to a lineup of just him, bassist Taylor and new guitarist Jerry McGee, with their only effort Memories released before the end of the year. By the end of the year, the group had been restructured again to reflect a much more jazz-heavy direction, with Mayall enlisting guitarist Freddie Robinson, drummer Ron Selico, saxophonist Clifford Solomon and trumpeter Richard "Blue" Mitchell to record the live album Jazz Blues Fusion. Patrick "Putter" Smith was added as a second bassist in early 1972, before Victor Gaskin took over a few months later. Former drummer Hartley returned to replace Selico in June, The group briefly added three more saxophonists – Charles Owens, Fred Jackson and Ernie Watts – for the live album Moving On, before all four were replaced by James "Red" Holloway. This lineup released the album Ten Years Are Gone in September 1973, which marked Mayall's ten-year anniversary as a professional musician.

In early 1974, after recovering from a broken leg, Mayall restructured his band again for a planned European tour, retaining only Holloway and adding guitarist Jesse Ed Davis, returning bassist Larry Taylor and drummer Soko Richardson. Davis was soon replaced by Randy Resnick and Hightide Harris, however. After releasing The Latest Edition, the band's lineup changed again as Mayall, Taylor and Richardson added returning violinist Don "Sugarcane" Harris and new members Rick Vito on guitar, Jay Spell on keyboards and Dee McKinnie on vocals. In 1976, Mayall collaborated with a wide range of his former bandmates for a second time on A Banquet in Blues, released in August. After the album's release, he toured with Taylor, Spell, Holloway, guitarist Gary Rowles and drummer Frank Wilson, plus touring percussionist Warren Bryant, saxophonists Jimmy Roberts, Ann Patterson and David Majal Li, trumpeter Nolan Smith, trombonist Bill Lamb, and vocalists Pepper Watkins and Patti Smith.

Mayall downsized again in 1977, bringing back Thompson and Richardson, and adding guitarist James Quill Smith. This lineup released A Hard Core Package in 1977 and The Last of the British Blues in 1978. After releasing Bottom Line in 1979, an album recorded with various session musicians, Mayall reunited with Mandel, who brought his backing band with him: bassist Angus Thomas, drummer Ruben Alvarez and vocalist Maggie Parker. Mandel pulled out of the tour early on, however, and Smith returned. No More Interviews was released at the end of the year, which also featured former guitarist Vito, keyboardist Chris Cameron and saxophonist Chris Mostert. In 1980, Road Show Blues was recorded with returning drummer Richardson and new bassist Kevin McCormick, as well as Parker and Smith.

=== 1981–2008: The band reforms ===
In December 1981, it was announced that John Mayall & the Bluesbreakers would reform for an Australian tour starting the following January, with the frontman joined by guitarist Mick Taylor, bassist John McVie and drummer Colin Allen. Hughie Flint filled in for Allen at four warm-up shows earlier in the month. The tour spawned the live video release Blues Alive, as well as several live tracks for the album Return of the Bluesbreakers. By June, McVie had been replaced by McCormick, who was then replaced by Thompson. In early 1984, Mayall and Taylor toured with bassist Tim Drummond and drummer Mike Gardner. Later in the year, Mayall introduced a new lineup of the Bluesbreakers, with Henry "Coco" Montoya and "Kal" David Raskin on guitars, Bobby Haynes on bass and Willie McNeil on drums, who recorded several tracks later released on the album Cross Country Blues. Raskin and McNeil were replaced early the following year by Walter Trout and Joe Yuele, respectively.

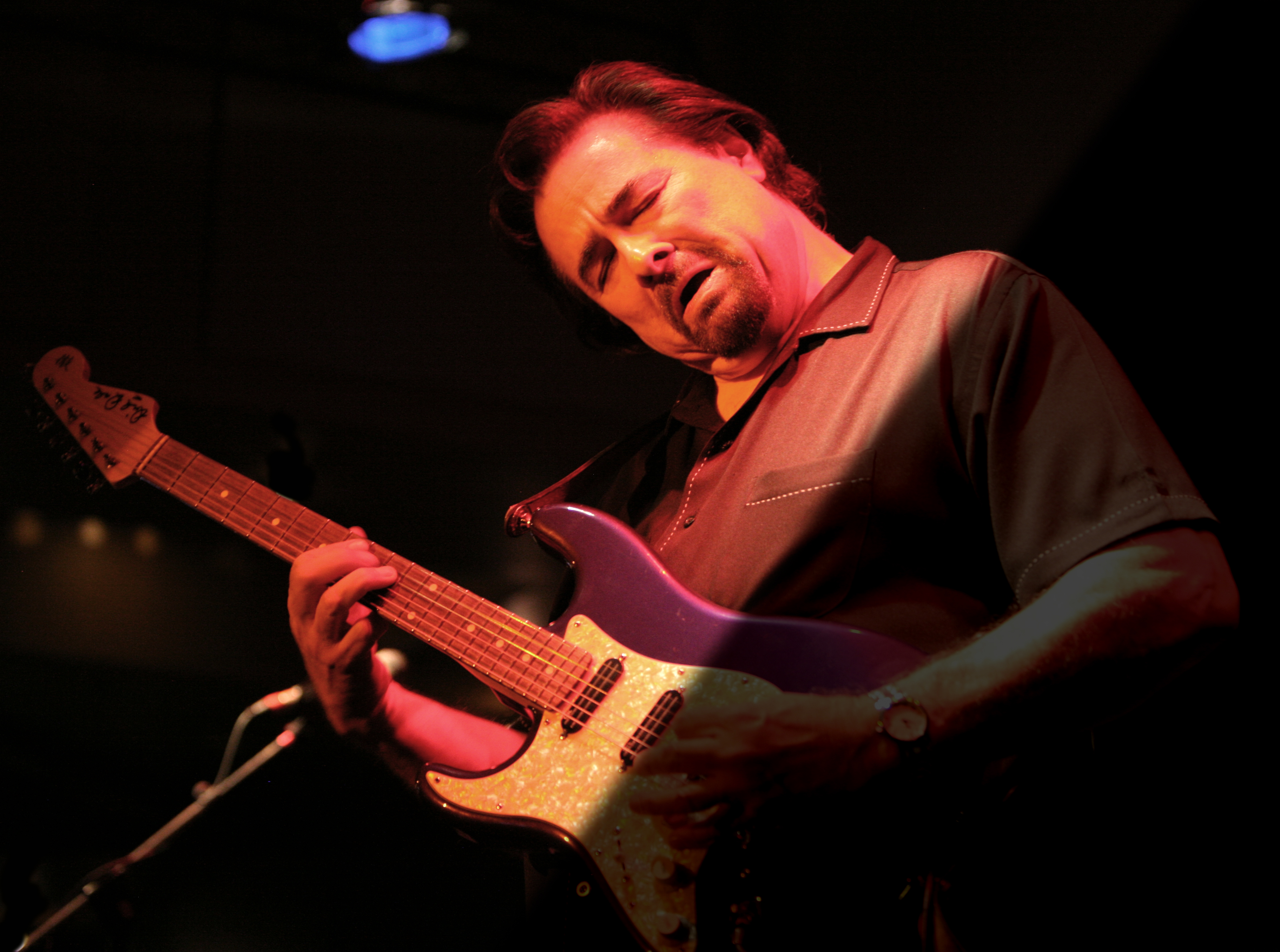
Coco Montoya was Mayall's lead guitarist between 1984 and 1993.

The lineup of Montoya, Trout, Haynes and Yuele remained stable for four years, recording two live albums and Mayall's first full studio effort in seven years, Chicago Line. In 1989, Trout left the Bluesbreakers to pursue a solo career, releasing his debut album before the end of the year. Rather than replace him, Mayall decided to reduce the band to a four-piece. In 1990, Haynes also left the group. Several tracks on 1990's A Sense of Place were recorded by Daniel "Freebo" Friedberg, who later also replaced Haynes on tour. Rick Cortes took over on bass before the end of the year. Following the release of Wake Up Call in 1993, Montoya left the band to pursue a solo career, with Buddy Whittington taking his place. Cortes left in 1996, with John Paulus taking his place in time to record 1997's Blues for the Lost Days.

Greg Rzab replaced Paulus for a European tour in 1999, but left again the following year to join The Black Crowes. Greg Boaz filled in for a tour in the summer of 2000, before Hank Van Sickle took over on a permanent basis in September. Along for the Ride, released in 2001, was credited to "John Mayall & Friends" and featured a wide range of contributors, including current band members, former members and other guest musicians. In early 2001, keyboardist Tom Canning – who had contributed to 1993's Wake Up Call as well as Along for the Ride – was added as an official member of the Bluesbreakers. In 2003, Mayall released the live album 70th Birthday Concert, recorded earlier in the year with guests including former members Eric Clapton, Mick Taylor and Henry Lowther.

=== 2008–2024: Later solo work ===
In November 2008, Mayall announced that he was retiring the Bluesbreakers name, and would return the following year with a new solo band. By January, he had revealed the members of his eponymous group: lead guitarist Rocky Athas, returning bassist Greg Rzab, and new drummer Jay Davenport. This lineup remained unchanged until September 2016, when Athas left Mayall's band due to the frontman's desire to revert to performing as a trio. This format yielded only one album, however – the 2018 live release Three for the Road – before Carolyn Wonderland joined in April 2018 as the band's new lead guitarist.

== Members ==
=== Final lineup ===
Image	Name	Years active	Instruments	Release contributions
	John Mayall	1963–2024	lead vocals; keyboards; harmonica; rhythm guitar	all John Mayall releases
	Greg Rzab	1999–2000; 2009–2024	bass; percussion	Studio albums: Along for the Ride (2001) – one track only; all from Tough (2009) to present; Other albums: UK Tour 2K (2001); Live in London (2011); Three for the Road (2018)
	Jay Davenport	2009–2024	drums; percussion	Studio albums: all from Tough (2009) to present; Other albums: Live in London (2011); Three for the Road (2018)
	Carolyn Wonderland	2018–2024	lead guitar; backing vocals	Nobody Told Me (2019)

=== Former ===
Image	Name	Years active	Instruments	Release contributions
	John McVie	1963–1965; 1965–1967; 1982	bass	Studio albums: Blues Breakers with Eric Clapton (1966); A Hard Road (1967); Crusade; A Banquet in Blues (1976) – guest appearance on one track; Along for the Ride (2001) – two tracks only; Other albums: John Mayall Plays John Mayall (1965); The 1982 Reunion Concert (1992); Rolling with the Blues (2002) – four tracks only; Live in 1967 (2015); Live in 1967, Vol. 2 (2016); Singles: all from "Crawling Up a Hill" (1964) to "Double Trouble" (1967)
	Bernie Watson	1963–1964	lead guitar	"Crawling Up a Hill" (1964)
	Peter Ward	1963	drums	none
	Martin Hart	1963–1964	drums	"Crawling Up a Hill" (1964)
	Hughie Flint	1964–1966; 1982	drums	Studio albums: Blues Breakers with Eric Clapton (1966); Other albums: John Mayall Plays John Mayall (1965); Looking Back (1969) – previously unreleased track "Stormy Monday"; Primal Solos (1977); Singles: "Crocodile Walk" (1965); "I'm Your Witchdoctor" (1965)
	Roger Dean	1964–1965 (died 2008)	lead guitar	John Mayall Plays John Mayall (1965); "Crocodile Walk" (1965)
	Eric Clapton	1965; 1965–1966	lead guitar; backing and occasional lead vocals	Studio albums: Blues Breakers with Eric Clapton (1966); Back to the Roots (1971); Other albums: Looking Back (1969) – previously unreleased track "Stormy Monday"; Primal Solos (1977); Archives to Eighties (1988) – archival appearance on five tracks; 70th Birthday Concert (2003); Singles: "I'm Your Witchdoctor" (1965); "Lonely Years" (1966)
	John Weider	1965 (died 2025)	lead guitar	none
	John Slaughter	1965	lead guitar	none
	Geoff Krivit	1965 (died 2022)	lead guitar	none
	Peter Green	1965; 1966–1967 (died 2020)	lead guitar; backing and occasional lead vocals	Studio albums: A Hard Road (1967); Blues from Laurel Canyon (1968) – guest appearance on one track; Along for the Ride (2001) – one track only; Other albums: Live in 1967 (2015); Live in 1967, Vol. 2 (2016); Singles: all from "Looking Back" (1966) to "Jenny" (1968), except "Suspicions" (1967)
	Jack Bruce	1965 (died 2014)	bass	Looking Back (1969) – previously unreleased bonus track "Stormy Monday"; Primal Solos (1977)
	Aynsley Dunbar	1966–1967	drums	Studio albums: A Hard Road (1967); Singles: all from "Looking Back" (1966) to "Curly" (1967)
	Micky Waller	1967 (died 2008)	drums	none
	Mick Fleetwood	1967	drums	Studio albums: Along for the Ride (2001) – one track only; Other albums: Live in 1967 (2015); Live in 1967, Vol. 2 (2016); Singles: "Double Trouble" (1967)
	Keef Hartley	1967–1968; 1971; 1972–1974 (died 2011)	drums	Studio albums: Crusade (1967); The Blues Alone (1967); Back to the Roots (1971); Ten Years Are Gone (1973); Other albums: The Diary of a Band, Vol. 1 (1968); The Diary of a Band, Vol. 2 (1968); Live in Europe (1971); Moving On (1972); Archives to Eighties (1988) – archival appearance on three tracks; Rock the Blues Tonight (1999) – three tracks only; Rolling with the Blues (2002); Singles: "Suspicions" (1967)
	Mick Taylor	1967–1969; 1982–1984	lead guitar	Studio albums: Crusade (1967); Bare Wires (1968); Blues from Laurel Canyon (1968); Back to the Roots (1971); Along for the Ride (2001) – one track only; Other albums: The Diary of a Band, Vol. 1 (1968); The Diary of a Band, Vol. 2 (1968); Live in Europe (1971); Primal Solos (1977) – three tracks only; Blues Alive (1983); Return of the Bluesbreakers (1985) – live tracks only; Archives to Eighties (1988) – archival appearance on four tracks; The 1982 Reunion Concert (1992); Rolling with the Blues (2002) – four tracks only; 70th Birthday Concert (2003); Singles: "Suspicions" (1967)
	Terry Edmonds	1967	rhythm guitar	none
	Chris Mercer	1967–1968	tenor saxophone; baritone saxophone	Studio albums: Crusade (1967); Bare Wires (1968); Other albums: The Diary of a Band, Vol. 1 (1968); The Diary of a Band, Vol. 2 (1968); Live in Europe (1971); Primal Solos (1977) – two tracks only; Singles: "Suspicions" (1967)
	Rip Kant	1967	baritone saxophone	Crusade (1967)
	Dick Heckstall-Smith	1967–1968 (died 2004)	tenor saxophone; soprano saxophone; baritone saxophone	Studio albums: Along for the Ride (2001) – one track only; Bare Wires (1968); Other albums: The Diary of a Band, Vol. 1 (1968); The Diary of a Band, Vol. 2 (1968); Live in Europe (1971); Primal Solos (1977) – two tracks only; Singles: "Suspicions" (1967)
	Paul Williams	1967 (died 2019)	bass	Other albums: The Diary of a Band, Vol. 2 (1968) – one track only; Singles: "Suspicions" (1967)
	Keith Tillman	1967–1968	bass	The Diary of a Band, Vol. 1 (1968); The Diary of a Band, Vol. 2 (1968)
	Henry Lowther	1967–1968	trumpet; cornet; violin	Studio albums: Bare Wires (1968); Other albums: Primal Solos (1977) – two tracks only; 70th Birthday Concert (2003) – guest appearance; Singles: "Looking Back" (1966)
	Andy Fraser	1968 (died 2015)	bass	none
	Tony Reeves	1968	bass; double bass	Studio albums: Bare Wires (1968); Other albums: Primal Solos (1977) – two tracks only
	Jon Hiseman	1968 (died 2018)	drums; percussion	Studio albums: Bare Wires (1968); Other albums: Primal Solos (1977) – two tracks only
	Steve Thompson	1968–1970; 1977–1978; 1983	bass	Studio albums: Blues from Laurel Canyon (1968); Empty Rooms (1970); Back to the Roots (1971) – one track only; A Hard Core Package (1977); Other albums: The Turning Point (1969); The Last of the British Blues (1978); Live at the Marquee 1969 (1999); Rolling with the Blues (2002) – two tracks only
	Colin Allen	1968–1969; 1982–1983	drums; tabla	Studio albums: Blues from Laurel Canyon (1968); Other albums: Blues Alive (1983); Return of the Bluesbreakers (1985) – live tracks only; The 1982 Reunion Concert (1992); Rolling with the Blues (2002) – five tracks only
	Jon Mark	1969–1970 (died 2021)	acoustic guitar	Studio albums: Empty Rooms (1970); A Banquet in Blues (1976) – guest appearance on one track; The Turning Point (1969); Live at the Marquee 1969 (1999)
	Johnny Almond	1969–1970 (died 2009)	tenor saxophone; alto saxophone; baritone saxophone; flute	Studio albums: Blues Breakers with Eric Clapton (1967) – four tracks only; A Hard Road (1967); Empty Rooms (1970); Back to the Roots (1971); A Banquet in Blues (1976) – guest appearance on one track; Other albums: The Turning Point (1969); Archives to Eighties (1988) – archival appearance on three tracks; Live at the Marquee 1969 (1999); Singles: "Looking Back" (1967)
	Alex Dmochowski	1970	bass	A Banquet in Blues (1976) – guest appearance on one track
	Anthony "Duster" Bennett	1970 (died 1976)	harmonica	none
	Larry Taylor	1970–1971; 1971–1973; 1974–1977 (died 2019)	bass	Studio albums: all from Empty Rooms (1970) to Memories (1971), and from The Latest Edition (1974) to A Banquet in Blues (1976); Other albums: Jazz Blues Fusion (1972); Moving On (1972); Lots of People (1977); Archives to Eighties (1988) – archival appearance; Rock the Blues Tonight (1999)
	Don "Sugarcane" Harris	1970–1971; 1974–1976 (died 1999)	violin; backing vocals	Studio albums: USA Union (1970); Back to the Roots (1971); Ten Years Are Gone (1973); New Year, New Band, New Company (1975); Notice to Appear (1975; A Banquet in Blues (1976) – one track only; Cross Country Blues (1992) – guest appearance on two tracks; Other albums: Archives to Eighties (1988) – archival appearance on five tracks; Rock the Blues Tonight (1999)
	Harvey Mandel	1970–1971; 1979	lead guitar	Studio albums: USA Union (1970); Back to the Roots (1971); Other albums: Archives to Eighties (1988) – archival appearance on four tracks; Rock the Blues Tonight (1999)
	Paul Lagos	1970–1971 (died 2009)	drums	Studio albums: Back to the Roots (1971); Other albums: Archives to Eighties (1988) – archival appearance on two tracks; Rock the Blues Tonight (1999)
	Gerry McGee	1971 (died 2019)	lead guitar; sitar	Studio albums: Back to the Roots (1971) – two tracks only; Memories (1971); Other albums: Archives to Eighties (1988) – archival appearance on two tracks
	Richard "Blue" Mitchell	1971–1974 (died 1979)	trumpet; flugelhorn	Studio albums: Ten Years Are Gone (1973); A Banquet in Blues (1976); Other albums: Jazz Blues Fusion (1972); Moving On (1972); Rock the Blues Tonight – three tracks only; Rolling with the Blues (2002)
	Freddie Robinson	1971–1974 (died 2009)	lead guitar	Studio albums: Ten Years Are Gone (1973); Other albums: Jazz Blues Fusion (1972); Moving On (1972); Rock the Blues Tonight – three tracks only; Rolling with the Blues (2002)
	Victor Gaskin	1971; 1972–1974 (died 2012)	bass; double bass	Studio albums: Ten Years Are Gone (1973); Other albums: Moving On (1972); Rock the Blues Tonight – three tracks only; Rolling with the Blues (2002)
	Fred Clark	1971	tenor saxophone	Ten Years Are Gone – live volume only Rock the Blues Tonight – three tracks only
	Clifford Solomon	1971–1972 (died 2004)	tenor saxophone; alto saxophone	Studio albums: Blues for the Lost Days (1997) – guest appearance on three tracks; Other albums: Jazz Blues Fusion (1972); Moving On (1972); Rolling with the Blues (2002) – four tracks only
	Ron Selico	1971–1972	drums; percussion	Jazz Blues Fusion (1972)
	Patrick "Putter" Smith	1972	bass; double bass	none
	Ernie Watts	1972–1974	tenor saxophone	Moving On (1972)
	Charles Owens	1972–1974	soprano saxophone; flute	Moving On (1972)
	Fred Jackson	1972–1974	baritone saxophone; tenor saxophone	Moving On (1972)
	James "Red" Holloway	1973–1974; 1976–1977 (died 2012)	tenor saxophone; alto saxophone; flute	Studio albums: Ten Years Are Gone (1973) - studio album only; The Latest Edition (1974); A Banquet in Blues (1976); Blues for the Lost Days (1997) – guest appearance on two tracks; Along for the Ride (2001) – one track only; In the Palace of the King (2007) – guest appearance on one track; Other albums: Lots of People (1977); Rolling with the Blues (2002)
	Soko Richardson	1974–1976; 1977–1978; 1980–1981 (died 2004)	drums; percussion	Studio albums: all from The Latest Edition (1974) to A Hard Core Package (1977); Road Show Blues (1981); Other albums: The Last of the British Blues (1978); Rolling with the Blues (2002) – four tracks only
	Jesse Ed Davis	1974 (died 1988)	lead guitar	none
	Randy Resnick	1974	lead guitar	The Latest Edition (1974)
	Hightide Harris (Willie Boyd/Willie Gitry)	1974	lead guitar	The Latest Edition (1974)
	Jay Spell	1974–1977 (died 2010)	keyboards; piano; clarinet; synthesizers	Studio albums: New Year, New Band, New Company (1975); Notice to Appear (1975); A Banquet in Blues (1976); Other albums: Lots of People (1977)
	Rick Vito	1974–1976; 1979–1980	lead guitar (1974–1976); rhythm guitar (1979–1980)	New Year, New Band, New Company (1975); Notice to Appear (1975); A Banquet in Blues (1976); No More Interviews (1979)
	Dee McKinnie	1974–1976	vocals	New Year, New Band, New Company (1975); Notice to Appear (1975); A Banquet in Blues (1976)
	Pepper Watkins	1976–1977	backing vocals	Studio albums: A Hard Core Package (1977); Other albums: Lots of People (1977); The Last of the British Blues (1978)
	Ann Patterson	1976–1977	alto saxophone; oboe; flute	Studio albums: A Hard Core Package (1977); Other albums: Lots of People (1977)
	Gary Rowles	1976–1977	lead guitar	Lots of People (1977)
	Frank Wilson	1976–1977	drums	Lots of People (1977)
	Warren Bryant	1976–1977	percussion	Lots of People (1977)
	Jimmy Roberts	1976–1977	tenor saxophone	Lots of People (1977)
	David Majal Li	1976–1977	baritone saxophone	Lots of People (1977)
	Nolan Smith	1976–1977	trumpet	Lots of People (1977)
	Bill Lamb	1976–1977	trombone; trumpet	Lots of People (1977)
	Patti Smith	1976–1977	backing vocals	Lots of People (1977)
	James Quill Smith	1977–1978; 1979–1981 (died 2018)	lead guitar; backing and occasional lead vocals	Studio albums: A Hard Core Package (1977); No More Interviews (1979); Road Show Blues (1981); Other albums: The Last of the British Blues (1978); Rolling with the Blues (2002) – four tracks only
	Maggie Mayall (nee Maggie Parker)	1979–1981	vocals; percussion	Studio albums: No More Interviews (1979); Road Show Blues (1981); Stories (2002); Tough (2009); Other albums: Rolling with the Blues (2002) – four tracks only
	Chris Mostert	1979–1980	soprano saxophone; tenor saxophone; flute	No More Interviews (1979); Road Show Blues (1981) – two tracks only
	Angus Thomas	1979–1980	bass; double bass	No More Interviews (1979)
	Rubén Alvarez	1979–1980	drums; percussion	No More Interviews (1979)
	Chris Cameron	1979–1980	keyboards; piano; synthesizers	No More Interviews (1979)
	Kevin McCormick	1980–1981; 1982–1983	bass	Studio albums: Road Show Blues (1981); Other albums: Return of the Bluesbreakers (1985) – live tracks only; Rolling with the Blues (2002) – four tracks only
	Mike Gardner	1981; 1983–1984	drums	Return of the Bluesbreakers (1985) – studio tracks only; Cross Country Blues (1992)
	Don McMinn	1981	lead guitar	Return of the Bluesbreakers (1985) – studio tracks only; Cross Country Blues (1992)
	Bobby Manuel	1981	rhythm guitar	Return of the Bluesbreakers (1985) – studio tracks only; Cross Country Blues (1992)
	Jeff Davis	1981	bass	Return of the Bluesbreakers (1985) – studio tracks only; Cross Country Blues (1992)
	Tim Drummond	1983–1984 (died 2015)	bass	Bottom Line (1979) – two tracks only; A Sense of Place (1990)
	Henry "Coco" Montoya	1984–1993	lead guitar; backing and occasional lead vocals	Studio albums: all from Chicago Line (1988) to Wake Up Call (1993); Return of the Bluesbreakers reissue bonus tracks (1993); Padlock on the Blues (1999) – guest appearance on one track; Other albums: Behind the Iron Curtain (1985); The Power of the Blues (1987); Live from Austin, TX (2007)
	Bobby Haynes Sr.	1984–1990 (died 2018)	bass	Studio albums: Chicago Line (1988); A Sense of Place (1990); Cross Country Blues (1992); Return of the Bluesbreakers reissue bonus tracks (1993); Other albums: Behind the Iron Curtain (1985); The Power of the Blues (1987)
	"Kal" David Raskin	1984–1985	lead guitar	Cross Country Blues (1992); Return of the Bluesbreakers reissue bonus tracks (1993)
	Willie McNeil	1984–1985	drums	Cross Country Blues (1992); Return of the Bluesbreakers reissue bonus tracks (1993)
	Joe Yuele	1985–2008	drums; percussion	Studio albums: Chicago Line (1988); A Sense of Place (1990); all from Wake Up Call (1993) to In the Palace of the King (2007); Other albums: Behind the Iron Curtain (1985); The Power of the Blues (1987); Archives to Eighties (1988); UK Tour 2K (2001); No Days Off (2003); 70th Birthday Concert (2003); Live from Austin, TX (2007)
	Walter Trout	1985–1989	lead guitar; harmonica; backing vocals	Studio albums: Chicago Line (1988); Other albums: Behind the Iron Curtain (1985); The Power of the Blues (1987)
	Daniel "Freebo" Friedberg	1990	bass	A Sense of Place (1990) – three tracks only
	Rick Cortes	1990–1996	bass	Wake Up Call (1993); Spinning Coin (1995)
	Buddy Whittington	1993–2008	lead guitar; backing and occasional lead vocals	Studio albums: all from Spinning Coin (1995) to In the Palace of the King (2007); Other albums: UK Tour 2K (2001); No Days Off (2003); 70th Birthday Concert (2003)
	John Paulus	1996–1999	bass	Blues for the Lost Days (1997); Padlock on the Blues (1999)
	Greg Boaz	2000	bass	none
	Hank Van Sickle	2000–2008	bass; double bass	Studio albums: Stories (2002); Road Dogs (2005); In the Palace of the King (2007); Other albums: No Days Off (2003); 70th Birthday Concert (2003)
	Tom Canning	2001–2008	keyboards; piano; backing vocals	Studio albums: Wake Up Call (1993); Along for the Ride (2001) – four tracks only; Stories (2002); Road Dogs (2005); In the Palace of the King (2007); Other albums: No Days Off (2003); 70th Birthday Concert (2003)
	Rocky Athas	2009–2016	lead guitar	Studio albums: Tough (2009); A Special Life (2014); Find a Way to Care (2015); Talk About That (2017); Other albums: Live in London (2011)

== Lineups ==
Period	Members	Releases
July – August 1963	John Mayall – vocals, keyboards, harmonica; Bernie Watson – guitar; John McVie – bass; Peter Ward – drums	none
August 1963 – April 1964	John Mayall – vocals, keyboards, harmonica; Bernie Watson – guitar; John McVie – bass; Martin Hart – drums	"Crawling Up a Hill" (1964)
April 1964	John Mayall – vocals, keyboards, harmonica; Bernie Watson – guitar; John McVie – bass; Hughie Flint – drums	none
April 1964 – April 1965	John Mayall – vocals, keyboards, harmonica; Roger Dean – guitar; John McVie – bass; Hughie Flint – drums	John Mayall Plays John Mayall (1965); "Crocodile Walk" (1965)
April – September 1965	John Mayall – vocals, keyboards, harmonica, guitar; Eric Clapton – lead guitar, backing vocals; John McVie – bass; Hughie Flint – drums	"I'm Your Witchdoctor" (1965)
September – October 1965	John Mayall – vocals, keyboards, harmonica, guitar; John Weider – lead guitar; John McVie – bass; Hughie Flint – drums	none
September – October 1965	John Mayall – vocals, keyboards, harmonica, guitar; John Slaughter – lead guitar; John McVie – bass; Hughie Flint – drums	none
October 1965	John Mayall – vocals, keyboards, harmonica, guitar; Geoff Krivit – lead guitar; John McVie – bass; Hughie Flint – drums	none
October 1965	John Mayall – vocals, keyboards, harmonica, guitar; Geoff Krivit – lead guitar; Jack Bruce – bass; Hughie Flint – drums	none
October – November 1965	John Mayall – vocals, keyboards, harmonica, guitar; Peter Green – lead guitar, backing vocals; Jack Bruce – bass; Hughie Flint – drums	none
November 1965	John Mayall – vocals, keyboards, harmonica, guitar; Eric Clapton – lead guitar, backing vocals; Jack Bruce – bass; Hughie Flint – drums	none
November 1965 – July 1966	John Mayall – vocals, keyboards, harmonica, guitar; Eric Clapton – lead guitar, backing vocals; John McVie – bass; Hughie Flint – drums	Blues Breakers with Eric Clapton (1966); "Lonely Years" (1966) (Note: "Lonely Years" features Mayall and Clapton only, and accordingly is credited to the duo rather than the Bluesbreakers.)
July – September 1966	John Mayall – vocals, keyboards, harmonica, guitar; Peter Green – lead guitar, backing vocals; John McVie – bass; Hughie Flint – drums	none
September 1966 – April 1967	John Mayall – vocals, keyboards, harmonica, guitar; Peter Green – lead guitar, backing vocals; John McVie – bass; Aynsley Dunbar – drums	"Looking Back" (1966); "Sitting in the Rain" (1967); A Hard Road (1967); All My Life (1967); "Curly" (1967) (Note: "Curly" features Green, McVie and Dunbar only, and is the only release credited to the Bluesbreakers without Mayall.); Live in 1967 (2015/16)
April 1967	John Mayall – vocals, keyboards, harmonica, guitar; Peter Green – lead guitar, backing vocals; John McVie – bass; Mickey Waller – drums	none
April – June 1967	John Mayall – vocals, keyboards, harmonica, guitar; Peter Green – lead guitar, backing vocals; John McVie – bass; Mick Fleetwood – drums	"Double Trouble" (1967)
June 1967	John Mayall – vocals, keyboards, harmonica, guitar; Peter Green – lead guitar, backing vocals; John McVie – bass; Keef Hartley – drums	none
June 1967	John Mayall – vocals, keyboards, harmonica; Mick Taylor – lead guitar; Terry Edmonson – rhythm guitar; John McVie – bass; Keef Hartley – drums; Chris Mercer – saxophone; Rip Kant – saxophone	none
June – August 1967	John Mayall – vocals, keyboards, harmonica, guitar; Mick Taylor – lead guitar; John McVie – bass; Keef Hartley – drums; Chris Mercer – saxophone; Rip Kant – saxophone	Crusade (1967)
August – September 1967	John Mayall – vocals, keyboards, harmonica, guitar; Mick Taylor – lead guitar; John McVie – bass; Keef Hartley – drums; Chris Mercer – saxophone; Dick Heckstall-Smith – saxophone	none
September – October 1967	John Mayall – vocals, keyboards, harmonica, guitar; Mick Taylor – lead guitar; Paul Williams – bass; Keef Hartley – drums; Chris Mercer – saxophone; Dick Heckstall-Smith – saxophone	"Suspicions" (1967)
October 1967 – February 1968	John Mayall – vocals, keyboards, harmonica, guitar; Mick Taylor – lead guitar; Keith Tillman – bass; Keef Hartley – drums; Chris Mercer – saxophone; Dick Heckstall-Smith – saxophone	The Diary of a Band, Volume One (1968); The Diary of a Band, Volume Two (1968)
February – March 1968	John Mayall – vocals, keyboards, harmonica, guitar; Mick Taylor – lead guitar; Keith Tillman – bass; Keef Hartley – drums; Chris Mercer – saxophone; Dick Heckstall-Smith – saxophone; Henry Lowther – trumpet, cornet, violin	none
March – April 1968	John Mayall – vocals, keyboards, harmonica, guitar; Mick Taylor – lead guitar; Andy Fraser – bass; Keef Hartley – drums; Chris Mercer – saxophone; Dick Heckstall-Smith – saxophone; Henry Lowther – trumpet, cornet, violin	none
April – July 1968	John Mayall – vocals, keyboards, harmonica, guitar; Mick Taylor – lead guitar; Tony Reeves – bass; Jon Hiseman – drums; Chris Mercer – saxophone; Dick Heckstall-Smith – saxophone; Henry Lowther – trumpet, cornet, violin	Bare Wires (1968)
August 1968 – June 1969	John Mayall – vocals, keyboards, harmonica, guitar; Mick Taylor – lead guitar; Steve Thompson – bass; Colin Allen – drums, tabla	Blues from Laurel Canyon (1968)
June 1969 – early 1970	John Mayall – vocals, keyboards, harmonica, guitar; Jon Mark – lead guitar; Steve Thompson – bass; Johnny Almond – saxophone, flute	The Turning Point (1969); Empty Rooms (1970); Live at the Marquee 1969 (1999)
Early – August 1970	John Mayall – vocals, keyboards, harmonica, guitar; Jon Mark – lead guitar; Alex Dmochowski – bass; Johnny Almond – saxophone, flute; Duster Bennett – harmonica	none
August – November 1970	John Mayall – vocals, keyboards, harmonica, guitar; Harvey Mandel – lead guitar; Larry Taylor – bass; Don "Sugarcane" Harris – violin	USA Union (1970)
November 1970 – early 1971	John Mayall – vocals, keyboards, harmonica, guitar; Harvey Mandel – lead guitar; Larry Taylor – bass; Paul Lagos – drums; Don "Sugarcane" Harris – violin	Back to the Roots (1971) (Note: In addition to the band's regular lineup, Back to the Roots also features a number of former band members as guest contributors.)
Early – late 1971	John Mayall – vocals, keyboards, harmonica, guitar; Gerry McGee – guitar; Larry Taylor – bass	Memories (1971)
Late 1971	John Mayall – vocals, keyboards, harmonica, guitar; Freddie Robinson – guitar; Victor Gaskin – bass; Keef Hartley – drums; Fred Clark – saxophone; Blue Mitchell – trumpet	Rock the Blues Tonight (1999)
November 1971 – March 1972	John Mayall – vocals, keyboards, harmonica, guitar; Freddie Robinson – guitar; Larry Taylor – bass; Ron Selico – drums; Clifford Solomon – saxophone; Blue Mitchell – trumpet	Jazz Blues Fusion (1972)
March – April 1972	John Mayall – vocals, keyboards, harmonica, guitar; Freddie Robinson – guitar; Larry Taylor – bass; Putter Smith – double bass; Ron Selico – drums; Clifford Solomon – saxophone; Blue Mitchell – trumpet	none
April – June 1972	John Mayall – vocals, keyboards, harmonica, guitar; Freddie Robinson – guitar; Larry Taylor – bass; Victor Gaskin – double bass; Ron Selico – drums; Clifford Solomon – saxophone; Blue Mitchell – trumpet	none
June – July 1972	John Mayall – vocals, keyboards, harmonica, guitar; Freddie Robinson – guitar; Larry Taylor – bass; Victor Gaskin – double bass; Keef Hartley – drums; Clifford Solomon – saxophone; Blue Mitchell – trumpet	none
July 1972 – early 1973	John Mayall – vocals, keyboards, harmonica, guitar; Freddie Robinson – guitar; Larry Taylor – bass; Victor Gaskin – double bass; Keef Hartley – drums; Clifford Solomon – saxophone; Ernie Watts – saxophone; Charles Owens – saxophone, flute; Fred Jackson – saxophone; Blue Mitchell – trumpet	Moving On (1972)
Early 1973 – early 1974	John Mayall – vocals, keyboards, harmonica, guitar; Freddie Robinson – guitar; Victor Gaskin – bass; Keef Hartley – drums; Red Holloway – saxophone, flute; Blue Mitchell – trumpet, flugelhorn	Ten Years Are Gone (1973)
March – April 1974	John Mayall – vocals, keyboards, harmonica, guitar; Jesse Ed Davis – guitar; Larry Taylor – bass; Soko Richardson – drums, percussion; Red Holloway – saxophone, flute	none
May – November 1974	John Mayall – vocals, keyboards, harmonica, guitar; Randy Resnick – guitar; Hightide Harris – guitar; Larry Taylor – bass; Soko Richardson – drums, percussion; Red Holloway – saxophone, flute	The Latest Edition (1974)
November 1974 – early 1976	John Mayall – vocals, keyboards, harmonica, guitar; Dee McKinnie – vocals; Rick Vito – guitar; Larry Taylor – bass; Soko Richardson – drums, percussion; Jay Spell – keyboards, piano, synthesizers; Don "Sugarcane" Harris – violin, vocals	New Year, New Band, New Company (1975); Notice to Appear (1975)
Early – late 1976	John Mayall – vocals, keyboards, harmonica, guitar; Dee McKinnie – vocals; Rick Vito – guitar; Larry Taylor – bass; Soko Richardson – drums, percussion; Jay Spell – keyboards, piano, synthesizers	A Banquet in Blues (1976) (Note: In addition to the band's regular lineup, A Banquet in Blues also features a number of former band members as guest contributors.)
Late 1976 – early 1977	John Mayall – vocals, keyboards, harmonica, guitar; Gary Rowles – lead guitar; Larry Taylor – bass; Frank Wilson – drums; Warren Bryant – percussion; Jay Spell – keyboards, piano, synthesizers; Red Holloway – saxophone; Jimmy Roberts – saxophone; Ann Patterson – saxophone, oboe, flute; David Majal Li – saxophone; Nolan Smith – trumpet; Bill Lamb – trombone, trumpet; Pepper Watkins – backing vocals; Patti Smith – backing vocals	Lots of People (1977)
1977–1978	John Mayall – vocals, keyboards, harmonica, guitar; James Quill Smith – lead guitar, backing vocals; Steve Thompson – bass; Soko Richardson – drums	A Hard Core Package (1977); The Last of the British Blues (1978)
Early 1979	John Mayall – vocals, keyboards, harmonica, guitar; Maggie Parker – vocals, percussion; Harvey Mandel – lead guitar; Angus Thomas – bass, double bass; Ruben Alvarez – drums, percussion	none
Early – mid-1979	John Mayall – vocals, keyboards, harmonica, guitar; Maggie Parker – vocals, percussion; James Quill Smith – lead guitar, backing vocals; Angus Thomas – bass, double bass; Ruben Alvarez – drums, percussion	none
Mid 1979 – early 1980	John Mayall – vocals, keyboards, harmonica, guitar; Maggie Parker – vocals, percussion; James Quill Smith – lead guitar, backing vocals; Rick Vito – rhythm guitar; Angus Thomas – bass, double bass; Ruben Alvarez – drums, percussion; Chris Cameron – keyboards, piano; Chris Mostert – saxophone, flute	No More Interviews (1979)
1980–1981	John Mayall – vocals, keyboards, harmonica, guitar; Maggie Parker – vocals, percussion; James Quill Smith – lead guitar, backing vocals; Kevin McCormick – bass; Soko Richardson – drums	Road Show Blues (1981)
Mid-1981	John Mayall – vocals, keyboards, harmonica, guitar; Don McMinn – lead guitar; Bobby Manuel – rhythm guitar; Jeff Davis – bass; Mike Gardner – drums	Return of the Bluesbreakers (1985) (studio tracks only)
January 1982	John Mayall – vocals, keyboards, harmonica, guitar; Mick Taylor – lead guitar; John McVie – bass; Hughie Flint – drums	none
January – June 1982	John Mayall – vocals, keyboards, harmonica, guitar; Mick Taylor – lead guitar; John McVie – bass; Colin Allen – drums	Blues Alive (1983); The 1982 Reunion Concert (1992)
June 1982 – early 1983	John Mayall – vocals, keyboards, harmonica, guitar; Mick Taylor – lead guitar; Kevin McCormick – bass; Colin Allen – drums	Return of the Bluesbreakers (1985) (live tracks only)
Early – late 1983	John Mayall – vocals, keyboards, harmonica, guitar; Mick Taylor – lead guitar; Steve Thompson – bass; Colin Allen – drums	none
Late 1983 – mid-1984	John Mayall – vocals, keyboards, harmonica, guitar; Mick Taylor – lead guitar; Tim Drummond – bass; Mike Gardner – drums	none
Summer 1984 – early 1985	John Mayall – vocals, keyboards, harmonica, guitar; Coco Montoya – lead guitar; Kal David – lead guitar; Bobby Haynes – bass; Willie McNeil – drums	Return of the Bluesbreakers (1993) (reissue bonus studio tracks only)
Early 1985 – mid-1989	John Mayall – vocals, keyboards, harmonica, guitar; Coco Montoya – lead guitar, backing vocals; Walter Trout – lead guitar, backing vocals; Bobby Haynes – bass; Joe Yuele – drums, percussion	Behind the Iron Curtain (1985); The Power of the Blues (1987); Chicago Line (1988)
Mid-1989 – early 1990	John Mayall – vocals, keyboards, harmonica, guitar; Coco Montoya – lead guitar, backing vocals; Bobby Haynes – bass; Joe Yuele – drums, percussion	A Sense of Place (1990)
Early – late 1990	John Mayall – vocals, keyboards, harmonica, guitar; Coco Montoya – lead guitar, backing vocals; Freebo – bass; Joe Yuele – drums, percussion	none
Late 1990 – 1993	John Mayall – vocals, keyboards, harmonica, guitar; Coco Montoya – lead guitar, backing vocals; Rick Cortes – bass; Joe Yuele – drums, percussion	Wake Up Call (1993)
1993–1996	John Mayall – vocals, keyboards, harmonica, guitar; Buddy Whittington – lead guitar, backing vocals; Rick Cortes – bass; Joe Yuele – drums, percussion	Spinning Coin (1995)
1996–1999	John Mayall – vocals, keyboards, harmonica, guitar; Buddy Whittington – lead guitar, backing vocals; John Paulus – bass; Joe Yuele – drums, percussion	Blues for the Lost Days (1997); Padlock on the Blues (1999)
1999 – summer 2000	John Mayall – vocals, keyboards, harmonica, guitar; Buddy Whittington – lead guitar, backing vocals; Greg Rzab – bass; Joe Yuele – drums, percussion	UK Tour 2K (2001); Along for the Ride (2001) (Note: In addition to the band's regular lineup, Along for the Ride also features a number of former band members and other musicians as guest contributors.)
Summer 2000	John Mayall – vocals, keyboards, harmonica, guitar; Buddy Whittington – lead guitar, backing vocals; Greg Boaz – bass; Joe Yuele – drums, percussion	none
September 2000 – March 2001	John Mayall – vocals, keyboards, harmonica, guitar; Buddy Whittington – lead guitar, backing vocals; Hank Van Sickle – bass, double bass; Joe Yuele – drums, percussion	none
March 2001 – November 2008	John Mayall – vocals, keyboards, harmonica, guitar; Buddy Whittington – lead guitar, backing vocals; Hank Van Sickle – bass, double bass; Joe Yuele – drums, percussion; Tom Canning – keyboards, piano, backing vocals	Stories (2002); No Days Off (2003); 70th Birthday Concert (2003) (Note: In addition to the band's regular lineup, 70th Birthday Concert also features a number of former band members as guest contributors.); Road Dogs (2005); In the Palace of the King (2007)
January 2009 – September 2016	John Mayall – vocals, keyboards, harmonica, guitar; Rocky Athas – lead guitar; Greg Rzab – bass, percussion; Jay Davenport – drums, percussion	Tough (2009); Live in London (2011); A Special Life (2014); Find a Way to Care (2015); Talk About That (2017)
September 2016 – April 2018	John Mayall – vocals, keyboards, harmonica, guitar; Greg Rzab – bass, percussion; Jay Davenport – drums, percussion	Three for the Road (2018)
April 2018 – July 2024	John Mayall – vocals, keyboards, harmonica, guitar; Carolyn Wonderland – lead guitar, backing vocals; Greg Rzab – bass, percussion; Jay Davenport – drums, percussion	Nobody Told Me (2019)

== Bibliography ==
- Bowling, David (18 July 2013), Eric Clapton FAQ: All That's Left to Know About Slowhand, Milwaukee, Wisconsin: Backbeat Books, ISBN 978-1617134548
- Brunning, Bob (26 May 1986), Blues: The British Connection, London, England: Blandford Press, ISBN 978-0713718362
- Egan, Sean (1 July 2016), Fleetwood Mac on Fleetwood Mac: Interviews and Encounters, Chicago, Illinois: Chicago Review Press, ISBN 978-1613732342
