= John Mayall discography =

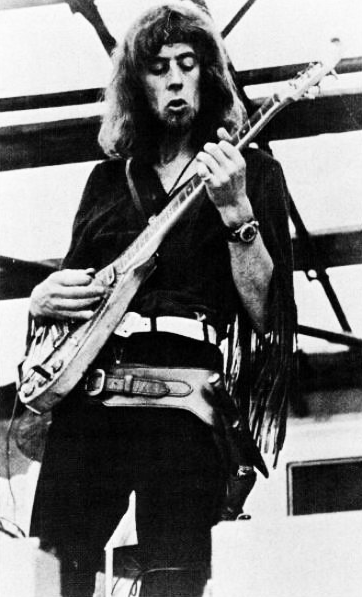
- Mayall performing in 1970
- Studio albums: 36
- EPs: 4
- Live albums: 34
- Compilation albums: 24
- Singles: 44
- Video albums: 4

The discography of English blues rock musician John Mayall, including the band John Mayall & the Bluesbreakers, consists of 35 studio albums, 34 live albums, 24 compilation albums, four extended plays (EPs), 44 singles and four video albums. Mayall's 38th studio album was released in 2022.

Mayall began his recording career in 1963 with the formation of John Mayall & the Bluesbreakers. After several early lineup changes and live debut John Mayall Plays John Mayall, the band released their self-titled debut studio album Blues Breakers with Eric Clapton in 1966, which featured guitarist Eric Clapton, bassist John McVie and drummer Hughie Flint. The album reached number 6 on the UK Albums Chart and was certified gold by the British Phonographic Industry. With new guitarist Peter Green and drummer Aynsley Dunbar, A Hard Road followed in 1967. It reached the UK Albums Chart top ten. Crusade, featuring Mick Taylor on guitar and Keef Hartley on drums, was released later in the year and peaked at number 8. It was also the group's first release to chart in the US, reaching number 136 on the Billboard 200.

Mayall's third release of 1967 was his debut solo studio album, The Blues Alone, which managed only to reach number 24 in the UK and number 128 in the US. The band's second and third live albums, The Diary of a Band, followed in January 1968 (by which time McVie had left), both of which reached the UK top 30 and the US top 100. A fourth studio album, Bare Wires, was the band's most successful to date, peaking at number 3 on the UK Albums Chart and number 59 on the US Billboard 200. Shortly after the album's release, however, the Bluesbreakers fell apart as several members left, and the group was disbanded. Relocating to the US with Taylor, Mayall released Blues from Laurel Canyon later in 1968, which reached number 33 on the UK Albums Chart and number 68 on the US Billboard 200.

Taylor left Mayall in June 1969 to join The Rolling Stones. The frontman replaced him with Jon Mark and released the live album The Turning Point later in the year, which was his first release to reach the US top 40 when it peaked at number 32. It was also certified gold by the Recording Industry Association of America. Compilation Looking Back was released around the same time, reaching number 14 in the UK and number 79 in the US. Empty Rooms followed in 1970, which saw Mayall return to the UK top ten. USA Union was released in the summer, featuring former Canned Heat members Harvey Mandel on guitar and Larry Taylor on bass, which reached a career record number 22 on the US Billboard 200. 1971's Back to the Roots peaked at number 31 in the UK and number 52 in the US.

Mayall continued to restructure his band and release new studio and live material throughout the 1970s and 1980s, with limited commercial success. In 1982 he returned to using the Bluesbreakers moniker, and in 1993 he registered on the UK Albums Chart for the first time in more than 20 years when Wake Up Call reached number 61. Since 2009, Mayall has been recording and touring under his own name, after retiring the Bluesbreaker name in late 2008.

== Albums ==
=== Studio albums ===
List of studio albums, with selected chart positions and certifications
Title	Album details	Peak chart positions											Certifications
Title	Album details	UK	AUS	BEL Fla.	BEL Wal.	CAN	FRA	GER	NED	NOR	SWI	US	Certifications
Blues Breakers with Eric Clapton (with the Bluesbreakers)	Released: 22 July 1966; Label: Decca; Formats: LP, reel-to-reel	6	—	—	—	—	—	—	—	—	—	—	BPI: Gold
A Hard Road (with the Bluesbreakers)	Released: 17 February 1967; Label: Decca; Formats: LP, reel-to-reel	10	—	—	—	—	—	—	—	—	—	—	
Crusade (with the Bluesbreakers)	Released: 1 September 1967; Label: Decca; Format: LP	8	—	—	—	—	—	—	—	20	—	136	
The Blues Alone	Released: November 1967; Label: Ace of Clubs; Formats: LP, reel-to-reel	24	—	—	—	—	—	—	—	—	—	128	
Bare Wires (with the Bluesbreakers)	Released: 21 June 1968; Label: Decca; Format: LP	3	—	—	—	—	—	—	—	9	—	59	
Blues from Laurel Canyon	Released: November 1968; Label: Decca; Formats: LP, reel-to-reel	33	—	—	—	38	—	33	—	—	—	68	
Empty Rooms	Released: March 1970; Label: Polydor; Format: LP	9	6	—	—	18	—	21	—	10	—	33	
USA Union	Released: October 1970; Label: Polydor; Formats: LP, 8-track, CS	50	—	—	—	18	—	—	—	20	—	22	
Back to the Roots	Released: March 1971; Label: Polydor; Formats: LP, 8-track, CS	31	44	—	—	40	—	—	—	—	—	52	
Memories	Released: November 1971; Label: Polydor; Formats: LP, 8-track, CS	—	—	—	—	—	—	—	—	—	—	179	
Ten Years Are Gone	Released: September 1973; Label: Polydor; Formats: LP, 8-track, CS	—	—	—	—	—	—	—	—	—	—	157	
The Latest Edition	Released: September 1974; Label: Polydor; Formats: LP, 8-track, CS	—	—	—	—	—	—	—	—	—	—	—	
New Year, New Band, New Company	Released: March 1975; Label: ABC; Formats: LP, 8-track	—	87	—	—	—	—	—	—	—	—	140	
Notice to Appear	Released: November 1975; Label: ABC; Formats: LP, 8-track, CS	—	—	—	—	—	—	—	—	—	—	—	
A Banquet in Blues	Released: August 1976; Label: ABC; Formats: LP, 8-track	—	—	—	—	—	—	—	—	—	—	—	
A Hard Core Package	Released: September 1977; Label: ABC; Formats: LP, 8-track	—	—	—	—	—	—	—	—	—	—	—	
Bottom Line	Released: May 1979; Label: DJM; Formats: LP, CS	—	—	—	—	—	—	—	—	—	—	—	
No More Interviews	Released: January 1980; Label: DJM; Formats: LP, 8-track, CS	—	—	—	—	—	—	—	—	—	—	—	
Road Show Blues	Released: May 1981; Label: DJM; Format: LP	—	—	—	—	—	—	—	—	—	—	—	
Return of the Bluesbreakers (with the Bluesbreakers)	Released: 1985; Label: AIM; Formats: CD, LP	—	—	—	—	—	—	—	—	—	—	—	
Chicago Line (with the Bluesbreakers)	Released: October 1988; Label: Island; Formats: CD, LP, CS	—	—	—	—	—	—	—	—	—	—	—	
A Sense of Place (with the Bluesbreakers)	Released: March 1990; Label: Island; Formats: CD, LP, CS	—	—	—	—	—	—	—	54	—	—	170	
Wake Up Call (with the Bluesbreakers)	Released: 6 April 1993; Label: Silvertone; Formats: CD, LP, CS	61	—	—	—	—	—	—	73	—	—	—	
Cross Country Blues (with the Bluesbreakers)	Released: 1994; Label: One Way; Format: CD	—	—	—	—	—	—	—	54	—	—	170	
Spinning Coin (with the Bluesbreakers)	Released: 28 February 1995; Label: Silvertone; Formats: CD, LP, CS	—	—	—	—	—	—	—	—	—	—	—	
Blues for the Lost Days (with the Bluesbreakers)	Released: 15 April 1997; Label: Silvertone; Format: CD	185	—	—	—	—	—	—	—	—	—	—	
Padlock on the Blues (with the Bluesbreakers and John Lee Hooker)	Released: 19 April 1999; Label: Eagle; Format: CD	—	—	—	—	—	—	—	—	—	—	—	
Along for the Ride (John Mayall & Friends)	Released: 8 May 2001; Label: Eagle; Format: CD	143	—	—	—	—	—	88	—	—	90	—	
Stories (with the Bluesbreakers)	Released: 27 August 2002; Label: Eagle; Format: CD	—	—	—	—	—	—	—	—	—	—	—	
Road Dogs (with the Bluesbreakers)	Released: 6 June 2005; Label: Eagle; Format: CD	—	—	—	—	187	—	—	—	—	—	—	
In the Palace of the King (with the Bluesbreakers)	Released: 5 March 2007; Label: Eagle; Format: CD	—	—	—	—	—	168	—	—	—	—	—	
Tough	Released: 15 September 2009; Label: Eagle; Formats: CD, LP, DL	—	—	—	—	—	140	—	—	—	—	—	
A Special Life	Released: 13 May 2014; Label: Forty Below; Formats: CD, LP, DL	—	—	185	—	—	—	—	—	—	—	—	
Find a Way to Care	Released: 4 September 2015; Label: Forty Below; Formats: CD, LP, DL	—	—	82	125	—	—	—	41	—	86	—	
Talk About That	Released: 27 January 2017; Label: Forty Below; Formats: CD, LP, DL	—	—	74	166	—	—	—	—	—	84	—	
Nobody Told Me	Released: 22 February 2019; Label: Forty Below; Formats: CD, LP, DL	—	—	69	76	—	195	28	88	—	16	—	
The Sun Is Shining Down	Released: 28 January 2022; Label: Forty Below; Formats: CD, LP, DL	—	—	—	159	—	—	84	—	—	28	—	
"—" denotes a release that did not chart or was not issued in that region.

=== Live albums ===
List of live albums, with selected chart positions and certifications
Title	Album details	Peak chart positions										Certifications
Title	Album details	UK	AUS	UK Amer.	UK Blues	UK Indie	CAN	GER	NOR	US	US Blues	Certifications
John Mayall Plays John Mayall (with the Bluesbreakers)	Released: 26 March 1965; Label: Decca; Format: LP	—	—	—	—	—	—	—	—	—	—	
The Diary of a Band, Vol. 1	Released: 3 January 1968; Label: Decca; Formats: LP, reel-to-reel	27	—	—	—	—	—	—	—	93	—	
The Diary of a Band, Vol. 2	Released: 3 January 1968; Label: Decca; Formats: LP, reel-to-reel	28	—	—	—	—	—	—	—	93	—	
The Turning Point	Released: September 1969; Label: Polydor; Formats: LP, 8-track, CS	11	—	—	—	—	48	18	17	32	—	RIAA: Gold
Live in Europe	Released: April 1971; Label: London; Formats: LP, CS	—	—	—	—	—	—	—	—	146	—	
Jazz Blues Fusion	Released: May 1972; Label: Polydor; Formats: LP, 8-track, CS	—	39	—	—	—	—	—	—	64	—	
Moving On	Released: October 1972; Label: Polydor; Format: LP, 8-track, CS	—	—	—	—	—	—	—	—	116	—	
Lots of People	Released: March 1977; Label: ABC; Formats: LP, CS	—	—	—	—	—	—	—	—	—	—	
Primal Solos	Released: August 1977; Label: Decca; Formats: LP, CS	—	—	—	—	—	—	—	—	—	—	
The Last of the British Blues	Released: August 1978; Label: ABC; Formats: LP, CS	—	—	—	—	—	—	—	—	—	—	
Behind the Iron Curtain (with the Bluesbreakers)	Released: 1985; Label: GNP Crescendo; Formats: LP, CS, CD	—	—	—	—	—	—	—	—	—	—	
The Power of the Blues (with the Bluesbreakers)	Released: 1987; Label: Entente; Format: LP, CD	—	—	—	—	—	—	—	—	—	—	
The 1982 Reunion Concert (with the Bluesbreakers)	Released: 1994; Label: One Way; Format: CD	—	—	—	—	—	—	—	—	—	—	
Rock the Blues Tonight	Released: 2 March 1999; Label: Indigo; Format: 2CD	—	—	—	—	—	—	—	—	—	—	
Live at the Marquee 1969	Released: 1999; Label: Eagle; Format: CD	—	—	—	—	—	—	—	—	—	—	
Time Capsule	Released: February 2000; Label: Private Stash; Format: CD	—	—	—	—	—	—	—	—	—	—	
UK Tour 2K	Released: 2001; Label: Private Stash; Format: CD	—	—	—	—	—	—	—	—	—	—	
Boogie Woogie Man	Released: 5 May 2001; Label: Private Stash; Format: CD	—	—	—	—	—	—	—	—	—	—	
Rolling with the Blues	Released: 15 November 2002; Label: Shakedown-Secret; Format: 2CD + DVD	—	—	—	—	—	—	—	—	—	—	
No Days Off (with the Bluesbreakers)	Released: 2003; Label: Private Stash; Format: CD	—	—	—	—	—	—	—	—	—	—	
70th Birthday Concert (with the Bluesbreakers and Friends (Eric Clapton, Mick Taylor, Chris Barber))	Released: 18 November 2003; Label: Eagle; Format: 2CD, DVD, BR	—	—	—	—	—	—	—	—	—	8	
Live: 1969	Released: 14 June 2004; Label: Eagle; Format: 2CD	—	—	—	—	—	—	34	—	—	—	
Live from Austin, TX (with the Bluesbreakers)	Released: 16 October 2007; Label: New West; Format: CD	—	—	—	—	—	—	—	—	—	—	
In the Shadow of Legends (with the Bluesbreakers)	Released: 12 September 2011; Label: Blues Boulevard; Formats: 2CD, DL	—	—	—	—	—	—	—	—	—	—	
Live in London	Released: 22 September 2011; Label: Private Stash; Formats: 2CD, DL	—	—	—	—	—	—	—	—	—	—	
Historic Live Shows, Vol. 1	Released: 16 October 2012; Label: Private Stash; Formats: CD, DL	—	—	—	—	—	—	—	—	—	—	
Historic Live Shows, Vol. 2	Released: 16 October 2012; Label: Private Stash; Formats: CD, DL	—	—	—	—	—	—	—	—	—	—	
Historic Live Shows, Vol. 3	Released: 16 October 2012; Label: Private Stash; Formats: CD, DL	—	—	—	—	—	—	—	—	—	—	
Blues Alive NYC 1976	Released: 31 March 2015; Label: RockBeat; Formats: CD, DL	—	—	—	—	—	—	—	—	—	—	
Live in 1967 (with the Bluesbreakers)	Released: 21 April 2015; Label: Forty Below; Formats: CD, LP; DL	—	—	—	—	32	—	—	—	—	4	
Live in 1967, Vol. 2 (with the Bluesbreakers)	Released: 6 May 2016; Label: Forty Below; Formats: CD, LP, DL	—	—	—	—	—	—	—	—	—	7	
Three for the Road	Released: 23 February 2018; Label: Forty Below; Formats: CD, DL	—	—	24	4	—	—	—	—	—	8	
Live in 1967, Vol. 3 (with the Bluesbreakers)	Released: 8 September 2023; Label: Forty Below; Formats: CD, LP, DL	—	—	—	—	—	—	—	—	—	7	
"—" denotes a release that did not chart or was not issued in that region.

=== Compilations ===
List of compilation albums, with selected chart positions
Title	Album details	Peak chart positions					
Title	Album details	UK	UK Blues	GER	NOR	US	US Blues
Looking Back	Released: August 1969; Label: Decca; Format: LP	14	—	12	13	79	—
The World of John Mayall, Vol. 1	Released: 16 January 1970; Label: Decca; Format: LP	—	—	—	—	—	—
The World of John Mayall, Vol. 2	Released: 1971; Label: Decca; Format: LP	—	—	—	—	—	—
Thru the Years	Released: October 1971; Label: London; Format: 2LP	—	—	—	—	164	—
Beyond the Turning Point	Released: October 1971; Label: Polydor; Format: LP	—	—	—	—	—	—
Down the Line	Released: 1972; Label: London; Format: 2LP	—	—	—	—	158	—
The Best of John Mayall	Released: 1973; Label: Polydor; Format: 2LP	—	—	—	—	—	—
So Many Roads	Released: before 1976; Label: Royal Sound (Germany); Format: LP	—	—	—	—	—	—
Blues Roots	Released: 1978; Label: Decca; Format: LP	—	—	—	—	—	—
The John Mayall Story, Vol. 1	Released: 1983; Label: Decca; Format: LP	—	—	—	—	—	—
The John Mayall Story, Vol. 2	Released: 1983; Label: Decca; Format: LP	—	—	—	—	—	—
The Collection	Released: 1986; Label: Castle Communications; Formats: CD, 2LP	—	—	—	—	—	—
Archives to Eighties (featuring Eric Clapton and Mick Taylor)	Released: 1988; Label: Polydor; Formats: CD, LP	—	—	—	—	—	—
1966–1972	Released: 1990; Label: London; Formats: 2CD, 3LP	—	—	—	—	—	—
London Blues: 1964–1969	Released: 20 October 1992; Label: Deram, PolyGram; Format: 2CD	—	—	—	—	—	—
Room to Move: 1969–1974	Released: 20 October 1992; Label: Polydor, Chronicles; Format: 2CD	—	—	—	—	—	—
Stormy Monday	Released: 10 October 1994; Label: Spectrum; Format: CD	—	—	—	—	—	—
As It All Began: 1964–69 (with the Bluesbreakers)	Released: 27 January 1998; Label: Deram; Format: CD	—	12	—	—	—	—
Drivin' On: The ABC Years (1975–1982)	Released: 22 September 1998; Label: MCA; Format: 2CD	—	—	—	—	—	—
Silver Tones: The Best of John Mayall & the Bluesbreakers (with the Bluesbreakers)	Released: 10 November 1998; Label: Silvertone; Format: CD	—	—	—	—	—	—
The Masters: Soundtrack to the Film Turning Point	Released: 1999; Label: Eagle; Format: 2CD	—	—	—	—	—	—
Steppin' Out: An Introduction to John Mayall	Released: 30 October 2001; Label: Decca; Format: CD	—	—	—	—	—	—
Rockin' the Roadshow	Released: 18 February 2003; Label: Castle Communications; Format: 2CD	—	—	—	—	—	—
Essentially John Mayall	Released: 2006; Label: Eagle Records; Format: 5 CD	—	—	—	—	—	—
Live at the BBC (with the Bluesbreakers)	Released: 15 January 2007; Label: Decca; Format: CD	—	—	—	—	—	—
So Many Roads: An Anthology (1964–1974)	Released: 3 August 2010; Label: Universal; Format: 4CD	—	—	—	—	—	15
The First Generation 1965–1974	Released: 29 January 2021; Label: Madfish / Snapper Music; Format: CD (Box Set 35CD)	—	—	—	—	—	—
The Second Generation (Live Magic 1968–1993	Released: Summer 2025; Label: Madfish / Snapper Music; Format: CD (Box Set 30CD)	—	—	—	—	—	—
"—" denotes a release that did not chart or was not issued in that region.

== Extended plays ==
List of extended plays
Title	EP details
All My Life (with the Bluesbreakers and Paul Butterfield)	Released: 6 January 1967; Label: Decca; Format: 7" vinyl
The John Mayall E.P.	Released: 1980; Label: DJM; Format: 7" vinyl
Broadcast 65 EP (with the Bluesbreakers)	Released: 22 April 2017; Label: Rhythm & Blues; Format: 7" vinyl
The Blues Breaker EP	Released: 9 May 2011; Label: One Media; Format: DL

== Singles ==
List of singles, with selected chart positions, showing year released and album name
Title	Year	Chart positions				Album
Title	Year	AUT	CAN	NLD	US	Album
"Crawling Up a Hill" (with the Bluesbreakers)	1964	—	—	—	—	non-album singles
"Crocodile Walk" (with the Bluesbreakers)	1965	—	—	—	—	non-album singles
"I'm Your Witchdoctor" (with the Bluesbreakers)	1965	—	—	—	—	non-album singles
"Lonely Years" (with Eric Clapton)	1966	—	—	—	—	non-album singles
"Key to Love" (with the Bluesbreakers)	1966	—	—	—	—	Blues Breakers with Eric Clapton
"On Top Of The World" (with the Bluesbreakers)	1966	—	—	—	—	Not issued
"Looking Back" (with the Bluesbreakers)	1966	—	—	—	—	non-album singles
"Sitting in the Rain" (with the Bluesbreakers)	1967	—	—	—	—	non-album singles
"Suspicions" (with the Bluesbreakers)	1967	—	—	—	—	Looking Back
"Jenny"	1968	—	—	—	—	Looking Back
"No Reply" (with the Bluesbreakers)	1968	—	—	—	—	Bare Wires
"Broken Wings" (with the Bluesbreakers)	1968	—	—	—	—	Bare Wires
"The Bear"	1968	—	—	—	—	Blues from Laurel Canyon
"Walking On Sunset"	1968	—	—	—	—	Blues from Laurel Canyon
"Don't Waste My Time"	1969	—	54	37	81	Empty Rooms
"Don't Pick A Flower"	1969	18	—	—	—	Empty Rooms
"Room to Move"	1969	14	92	5	102	The Turning Point
"Thinking of My Woman"	1970	—	—	—	—	Empty Rooms
"Nature's Disappearing"	1970	—	—	—	—	USA Union
"Took the Car"	1970	—	—	—	—	USA Union
"Dream with Me"	1971	—	—	—	—	Back to the Roots
"Prisons on the Road"	1971	—	—	—	—	Back to the Roots
"Play the Harp"	1972	—	—	—	—	Memories
"Moving On"	1972	—	—	—	—	Moving On
"Gasoline Blues"	1974	—	—	—	—	The Latest Edition
"Let Me Give"	1974	—	—	—	—	non-album single
"Step in the Sun"	1975	—	—	—	—	New Year, New Band, New Company
"Sunshine"	1976	—	—	—	—	A Banquet in Blues
"Bottom Line"	1979	—	—	—	—	Bottom Line
"Falling"	1979	—	—	—	—	No More Interviews
"The Last Time" (with the Bluesbreakers)	1989	—	—	—	—	Chicago Line
"Fascinatin' Lover" (with the Bluesbreakers)	1989	—	—	—	—	Chicago Line
"Sensitive Kind" (with the Bluesbreakers)	1990	—	—	—	—	A Sense of Place
"Jacksonboro Highway" (with the Bluesbreakers)	1990	—	—	—	—	A Sense of Place
"Congo Square" (with the Bluesbreakers)	1990	—	—	—	—	A Sense of Place
"Mail Order Mystics" (with the Bluesbreakers)	1993	—	—	—	—	Wake Up Call
"Ain't No Brakeman" (with the Bluesbreakers)	1995	—	—	—	—	Spinning Coin
"Dead City" (with the Bluesbreakers)	1997	—	—	—	—	Blues for the Lost Days
"Pride & Faith" (with the Bluesbreakers)	2002	—	—	—	—	Stories
"World Gone Crazy" (split with Walter Trout)	2014	—	—	—	—	A Special Life
"The Sum of Something" (live)	2018	—	—	—	—	Three for the Road
"Big Town Playboy" (live)	2018	—	—	—	—	Three for the Road
"Distant Lonesome Train"	2018	—	—	—	—	Nobody Told Me
"What Have I Done Wrong" (featuring Joe Bonamassa)	2018	—	—	—	—	Nobody Told Me
"—" denotes a release that did not chart or was not issued in that region.

== Video albums ==
List of video albums
Title	Album details
Blues Alive (with the Bluesbreakers)	Released: 1983; Label: Pioneer Artists; Format: VHS
Purely Music	Released: 15 August 1991; Label: Image; Format: Laserdisc
70th Birthday Concert (with the Bluesbreakers and Friends)	Released: 9 December 2003; Label: Eagle Vision; Format: DVD
The Godfather of British Blues/ The Turning Point	Released: 29 June 2004; Label: Eagle Vision; Format: DVD
