= Anne Patterson =

Anne Patterson may refer to:

== People ==
- Anne M. Patterson (born 1959), Associate Justice of the New Jersey Supreme Court
- Anne W. Patterson (born 1949), U.S. diplomat, Assistant Secretary of State for Near Eastern Affairs
- Anne Patterson (artist) (born 1960), American designer, painter and sculptor
- Ann Patterson (born 1946), American jazz saxophonist and bandleader

== See also ==
- Ann Patterson, American jazz musician
- Anna Patterson, Vice President of Engineering, Artificial Intelligence at Google
