= Looking Back (John Mayall album) =

Compilation album by John Mayall
- Released: August 1969
- Recorded: February 1963 – May 1969
- Genre: Blues
- Length: 37:54
- Label: Decca (UK) (Single L.P.); Decca (TELDEC) (GER) (Double L.P.)
- Producer: John Mayall, Mike Vernon

John Mayall chronology
Blues from Laurel Canyon (1968)	Looking Back (1969)	Thru the Years (1969)

Professional ratings
Review scores
Source	Rating
Allmusic	3/5 stars
The Penguin Guide to Blues Recordings	3/4 stars

Looking Back is the seventh album released by John Mayall in August 1969 by Decca Records. The album features songs by both John Mayall's Bluesbreakers and John Mayall solo work. The album reached No. 79 on the Billboard 200. Confusingly, there are two different albums with the title "Looking Back": a Decca UK release as a single album (SKL 5010) and a Decca Germany (issued by TELDEC) release as a double album (DS 3104/1-2). Later issues on CD would use the Deram label.

== Album description ==
The German Decca release was a double album, whilst the UK Decca release only featured Eric Clapton on one track. However, the German release did not have the title track in its track listing, and the songs are not as rare, with several songs ("Parchman Farm", "Double Crossing Time", "The Super-Natural", "Steppin' Out", "Ramblin' on my Mind", "The Death of J. B. Lenoir", "Checking Up on my Baby", and "I Can't Quit You Baby") already released on The Bluesbreakers' studio albums (Blues Breakers with Eric Clapton, A Hard Road, and Crusade).

== Track listings ==
=== Decca UK release ===
Side one
No.	Title	Writer(s)	Original release	Length
1.	"Mr. James"	John Mayall	B-side of Decca F11900	2:55
2.	"Blues City Shakedown (instr.)"	Mayall	B-side of Decca F12120	2:23
3.	"Stormy Monday (live)"	T-Bone Walker	Previously unreleased	4:36
4.	"So Many Roads"	Paul Marshall, P. Williams	B-side of Decca F12506	4:46
5.	"Looking Back"	Johnny "Guitar" Watson	A-side of Decca F12506	2:37
6.	"Sitting in the Rain"	Mayall	A-side of Decca F12545	2:59

Side two
No.	Title	Writer(s)	Original release	Length
1.	"It Hurts Me Too"	Mel London, Hudson Whittaker	B-side of Decca F12621	2:57
2.	"Double Trouble"	Otis Rush, M. Melka	A-side of Decca F12621	3:22
3.	"Suspicions (Part Two)"	Mayall	B-side of Decca F12684	5:29
4.	"Jenny"	Mayall	B-side of Decca F12732	4:38
5.	"Picture on the Wall"	Mayall	A-side of Decca F12732	3:02

=== Decca Germany release ===
Side one
No.	Title	Writer(s)	Length
1.	"Third Degree"	Eddie Boyd	3:17
2.	"Stormy Monday"	T-Bone Walker	4:34
3.	"Jenny"	Mayall	4:33
4.	"Picture on the Wall"	Mayall	3:03
5.	"Chicago Line"	Mayall	4:39

Side two
No.	Title	Writer(s)	Length
1.	"Steppin' Out"	Memphis Slim, James Bracken	2:29
2.	"Have You Heard"	Mayall	5:54
3.	"Ramblin' on My Mind"	Robert Johnson	3:11
4.	"The Super-Natural"	Peter Green	2:54
5.	"Double Crossing Time"	Mayall, Eric Clapton	3:06
6.	"Parchman Farm"	Mose Allison	2:24

Side three
No.	Title	Writer(s)	Length
1.	"Dust My Blues"	Elmore James	2:47
2.	"You Don't Love Me"	Willie Cobbs	2:47
3.	"Don't Kick Me"	Mayall	3:09
4.	"Brown Sugar"	Mayall	3:41
5.	"The Death of J. B. Lenoir"	Mayall	4:17
6.	"Stand Back Baby"	Mayall	1:48

Side four
No.	Title	Writer(s)	Length
1.	"Checkin' Up on My Baby"	Sonny Boy Williamson	3:49
2.	"I Can't Quit You Baby"	Willie Dixon	4:28
3.	"Sandy"	Mayall	3:46
4.	"Blood on the Night"	Mayall	8:59

== Personnel ==
- John Mayall – Lead vocals, piano, organ, guitar, harmonica

John Mayall & The Bluesbreakers

- Bernie Watson – Guitar on "Mr. James"
- Roger Dean – Guitar on "Blues City Shakedown"
- Eric Clapton – Lead guitar on "Stormy Monday"
- Peter Green – Lead guitar on tracks 4 to 8, 10, and steel guitar on "Picture on the Wall"
- Mick Taylor – Lead guitar on "Suspicions (Part Two)"
- John McVie – Bass guitar on tracks 1, 2, and 4 to 8.
- Jack Bruce – Bass guitar on "Stormy Monday"
- Paul Williams – Bass guitar on "Suspicions (Part Two)"
- Martin Hart – Drums on "Mr. James"
- Hughie Flint – Drums on "Blues City Shakedown" and "Stormy Monday"
- Aynsley Dunbar – Drums on "So Many Roads", Looking Back", and "Sitting in the Rain"
- Mick Fleetwood – Drums on "It Hurts Me Too" and "Double Trouble"
- Keef Hartley – Drums on "Suspicions (Part Two)" and "Picture on the Wall"
- Dick Heckstall-Smith – Tenor and soprano saxophones on "Suspicions (Part Two)"
- Chris Mercer – Tenor saxophone on "Suspicions (Part Two)"

Additional musicians

- Malcolm Poole – Bass guitar
- Colin Allen – Drums
- John Almond – Flute, saxophone

Production

- John Mayall – Producer
- Mike Vernon – Producer
- Tony Clarke – Producer on "Blues City Shakedown"
- Bob Gordon – Photography

== Charts ==
Album

Year	Chart	Position
1969	Billboard 200	79
1969	UK Top 40 Albums	14
