= Road Dogs (John Mayall album) =

Studio album by John Mayall
- Released: June 2005
- Recorded: 10 January – 10 February 2005
- Genre: Blues
- Length: 70:45
- Label: Eagle
- Producer: John Mayall

John Mayall chronology
The Turning Point Soundtrack (2004)	Road Dogs (2005)	Live at the BBC (2007)

Professional ratings
Review scores
Source	Rating
AllMusic	3.5/5 stars
All About Jazz	(favorable)

Road Dogs is a studio album by British Bluesman John Mayall with the Bluesbreakers. Recorded between 10 January and 10 February 2005 in Calabasas, California.

== Track listing ==
All song words and music by John Mayall except where indicated.

1. "Road Dogs" (6:03)
2. "Short Wave Radio" (5:05)
3. "So Glad" (4:05)
4. "Forty Days" (4:06)
5. "To Heal the Pain" (5:16)
6. "Burned Bridges" (4:32)
7. "Snake Eye" (4:01)
8. "Kona Village" (4:54)
9. "Beyond Control" (6:35)
10. "Chaos in the Neighborhood" (5:10)
11. "You'll Survive" (4:41)
12. "Awestruck and Spellbound" (Buddy Whittington, Joe Yuele, 3:58)
13. "With You" (4:37)
14. "Brumwell's Beat" (Joe Yuele, Buddy Whittington, 3:56)
15. "Scrambling" (3:40)

== Personnel ==
The Bluesbreakers

- John Mayall – vocals, keyboards, harmonica
- Buddy Whittington – guitars
- Hank Van Sickle – bass guitar
- Joe Yuele – drums

Additional musicians

- Tom Canning – keyboards on all tracks but 1, 4 & 5
- Dave Morris Jr. – violin on 5
- Eric Steckel – lead guitar on track 10

Transcribed from an original album cover.
