= Live from Austin, TX (John Mayall album) =

Live album by John Mayall and the Bluesbreakers
- Released: October 16, 2007
- Recorded: September 13, 1993
- Venue: Austin City Limits, Texas
- Genre: Blues rock
- Length: 47:13
- Label: New West Records
- Producer: G.Biggs, C.Strang

John Mayall and the Bluesbreakers chronology
In the Palace of the King (2007)	Live from Austin, TX (2007)

Live from Austin, TX is a live album by John Mayall and the Bluesbreakers. The performance from September 13, 1993 was for the TV show Austin City Limits and has been released in 2007 on CD and DVD. Only John Mayall is credited on the cover but he can be heard to announce 'The Bluesbreakers': Joe Yuele on drums, Rick Cortes on bass and Coco Montoya on lead guitar. Texas guitarist David Grissom makes a guest appearance on last track.

The concert marks for John Mayall's band a return to the standard quartet format, after some ten years with twin lead guitars. Playing alone now gives Coco Montoya the opportunity to present his own approach to the music which sounds more British blues. Mayall, who was soon to turn 60 years old, is also in top form as pianist, harmonica player and singer.

Eight of the nine tracks are songs from the album Wake Up Call released earlier the same year. Among them, "Nature's Disappearing" was already a re-recording of a song from USA Union (1970). "The Bear" is the exception which comes from Blues from Laurel Canyon, a 1968 album.

== Track listing ==
All tracks composed by John Mayall; except where indicated

1. "I Want to Go" (J.B. Lenoir) - 3:51
2. "Ain't That Lovin' You Baby" (Jimmy Reed) - 6:46
3. "Maydell" (Warren Haynes, Johnny Neel) - 4:05
4. "Wake Up Call" (David Egan, David Love Lewis) - 5:04
5. "I'm a Sucker for Love" - 7:13
6. "Nature's Disappearing" - 5:38
7. "I Could Cry" (Junior Wells) 7:13
8. "The Bear" - 7:39
9. "Mail Order Mystics" (Chris Smither) - 8:25
