= A Hard Road =

Studio album by John Mayall & the Bluesbreakers
- Released: 17 February 1967
- Recorded: 11, 12, 19 & 24 October; 11 November 1966
- Studio: Decca Studios, London
- Genre: Blues rock
- Length: 37:13 (original); 79:22 (2006 reissue)
- Label: Decca (UK); London (U.S.)
- Producer: Mike Vernon

John Mayall & the Bluesbreakers chronology
Blues Breakers with Eric Clapton (1966)	A Hard Road (1967)	Crusade (1967)

John Mayall chronology
Blues Breakers with Eric Clapton (1966)	A Hard Road (1966)	Crusade (1967)

Professional ratings
Review scores
Source	Rating
Allmusic	4/5 stars
Rolling Stone	(Highly Positive)
Encyclopedia of Popular Music	4/5 stars
Living Blues	(Positive)
About.com	5/5 stars
The Penguin Guide to Blues Recordings	3/4 stars

A Hard Road is the third album (and second studio album) recorded by John Mayall & the Bluesbreakers, released in 1967. It introduced Peter Green on lead guitar following the departure of Eric Clapton, and also featured John McVie on bass, Aynsley Dunbar on drums and John Almond on saxophone. Tracks 5, 7 and 13 feature the horn section of Alan Skidmore and Ray Warleigh. Green additionally sings lead vocals on "You Don't Love Me" and "The Same Way". The cover art and the original LP sleeve design are by Mayall.

The album reached #8 on the UK album charts which is Mayall's third best showing on the chart next to Bare Wires and Bluesbreakers with Eric Clapton which reached #3 and #6, respectively. Two different expanded versions of the album were released in 2003 and 2006.

== Reception ==
Reaction to the album was mostly positive, and many praised Green's guitar playing. Team Rock rated the album at 14, on their "Top 30 British Blues Rock Albums of All Time". The two re-issues of the album, in 2003 (double CD) and 2006 (single CD), have compiled all of the Peter Green studio contributions he made to John Mayall's Bluesbreakers over 1966–1971. The bonus tracks missing from the 2006 remaster (except "Evil Woman Blues") appeared on the remastered versions of the next Bluesbreakers studio albums, "Crusade" and "Bare Wires".

It was voted number 638 in the third edition of Colin Larkin's All Time Top 1000 Albums (2000).

== Track listing ==
All tracks by John Mayall except where noted.

=== Original album ===
Side one

1. "A Hard Road" – 3:12
2. "It's Over" – 2:51
3. "You Don't Love Me" (Willie Cobbs) – 2:50
4. "The Stumble" (instrumental) (Freddie King, Sonny Thompson) – 2:54
5. "Another Kinda Love" – 3:06
6. "Hit the Highway" – 2:17
7. "Leaping Christine" – 2:25

Side two

1. "Dust My Blues" (Elmore James, Joe Josea) – 2:50
2. "There's Always Work" – 1:38
3. "The Same Way" (Peter Green) – 2:11
4. "The Super-Natural" (instrumental) (Green) – 2:57
5. "Top of the Hill" – 2:40
6. "Someday, After Awhile (You'll Be Sorry)" (King, Thompson) – 3:02
7. "Living Alone" – 2:23

=== 2003 expanded version (2CD/36 tracks) ===
==== Disc one ====
1–14 Original album tracks (as above)

15. "Evil Woman Blues" (Green) – 4:05
16. "All My Life" (Robinson) – 4:25
17. "Ridin' on the L & N" (Burley, Hampton) – 2:32
18. "Little by Little" (London, Wells) – 2:47
19. "Eagle Eye" – 2:52

==== Disc two ====
1. "Looking Back" (Watson) – 2:37
2. "So Many Roads" (Paul) – 4:47
3. "Sitting in the Rain" – 2:59
4. "Out of Reach" (Green) – 4:44
5. "Mama, Talk to Your Daughter" (Atkins, Lenoir) – 2:39
6. "Alabama Blues" (Lenoir) – 2:31
7. "Curly" (Green) – 4:51
8. "Rubber Duck" (Dunbar, Green) – 4:00
9. "Greeny" (Green) – 3:56
10. "Missing You" (Green) – 1:59
11. "Please Don't Tell" – 2:29
12. "Your Funeral and My Trial" (Williamson) – 3:56
13. "Double Trouble" (Rush) – 3:22
14. "It Hurts Me Too" (London) – 2:57
15. "Jenny" – 4:38
16. "Picture on the Wall" – 3:03
17. "First Time Alone" – 5:00

The additional material is:

Disc 1: 15 from Raw Blues; 16–19 from the John Mayall's Bluesbreakers with Paul Butterfield EP

Disc 2: 1–3 and 13–16 from Looking Back; 4–7 and 9–12 from Thru the Years; 8 from the B-side of "Curly" single; 17 from Blues from Laurel Canyon

=== 2006 UK expanded version (1CD/28 tracks, 4 unreleased) ===
1–14 Original album tracks (as above)

15. "Looking Back" (Watson) – 2:37
16. "So Many Roads" (Paul) – 4:47
17. "Mama, Talk to Your Daughter" (Atkins, Lenoir) – 2:39
18. "Alabama Blues" (Lenoir) – 2:31
19. "All My Life" – 4:25
20. "Ridin' on the L & N" (Burley, Hampton) – 2:32
21. "Eagle Eye" – 2:52
22. "Little By Little" – 2:47
23. "Sitting in the Rain" – 2:59
24. "Out of Reach" (Green) – 4:44
25. "No More Tears" – 2:19
26. "Ridin' on the L & N" (Burley, Hampton) – 2:19
27. "Sitting in the Rain" – 2:53
28. "Leaping Christine" – 1:55

The previously unreleased tracks 15–16, 23 from Looking Back (Decca SKL 5010); 17–18, 24 from Thru the Years (Decca SKL 5086); 19–22 are from the John Mayall's Bluesbreakers with Paul Butterfield EP (Decca DFE 8673); 25–28 are from BBC Light Programme Saturday Club session recorded 23 January 1967

== Personnel ==
Original album

John Mayall & the Bluesbreakers

- John Mayall – vocals, guitar, harmonica, piano, organ
- Peter Green – guitar, vocals
- John McVie – bass
- Aynsley Dunbar – drums

with:

- John Almond, Alan Skidmore – saxophones
- Ray Warleigh – wind instruments

2003 expanded edition Same as above with the addition of:

- Colin Allen – drums
- Paul Butterfield – harmonica, vocals
- Mick Fleetwood – drums
- Henry Lowther – trumpet
- Nick Newell – saxophone

Production

- Produced by Mike Vernon
- Recording Engineer: Gus Dudgeon
