= John Mayall & the Bluesbreakers =

English blues band

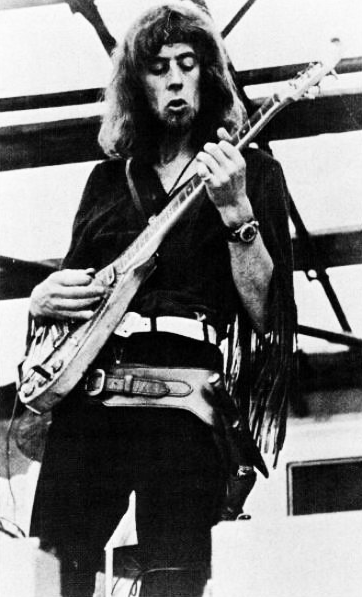
- John Mayall in 1970, the year the Bluesbreakers first broke up

Background information
- Origin: London, England
- Genres: British blues; blues rock
- Years active: 1963–1970; 1982–2008; 2020–2024
- Labels: Decca; London; Deram
- Spinoffs: Cream; Fleetwood Mac; Colosseum
- Past members: John Mayall; (List of band members)
- Website: johnmayall.com

John Mayall & the Bluesbreakers were an English blues rock band led by multi-instrumentalist, singer and songwriter John Mayall. The band has been influential as an incubator for British rock and blues musicians. Many of the best known bands to come out of Britain in the 1960s and 1970s had members that came through the Bluesbreakers at one time, forming the foundation of British blues music that is still played heavily on classic rock radio. Among those with a tenure in the Bluesbreakers are guitarists Eric Clapton (later of Cream, Blind Faith, Derek and the Dominos and a successful solo career), Peter Green (later of Fleetwood Mac) and Mick Taylor (later of the Rolling Stones), bassists John McVie (later of Fleetwood Mac), Jack Bruce (later of Cream) and Tony Reeves (later of Colosseum), drummers Hughie Flint, Aynsley Dunbar (later of Frank Zappa & the Mothers of Invention, Journey and Jefferson Starship), Mick Fleetwood (later of Fleetwood Mac) and Jon Hiseman (later of Colosseum), and numerous others.

Mayall used the band name between 1963 and 1970, then dropped it for twelve years. In 1982, a 'Return of the Bluesbreakers' was announced, and the name was used until the band again dissolved in 2008. The name has become generic, without a clear distinction between recordings by Mayall alone and those by Mayall and his band.

== History ==
The band that would evolve into the Bluesbreakers in 1965 was formed in February 1963 and became an ever-changing lineup of more than 100 combinations of musicians performing under the name. Eric Clapton joined in April 1965, a few months after the release of their first album. Clapton brought guitar-led blues influences to the forefront of the group; he had left the Yardbirds in order to concentrate on the blues.

The first single released by John Mayall and his band, in May 1964, was the song "Crawling Up a Hill", with "Mr. James" as the B-side. The band on the single was composed of Peter Ward, John McVie on bass, Bernie Watson on guitar, and Martin Hart on drums. After the release, Watson was replaced by Roger Dean, and Hart by Hughie Flint. This lineup played on the album John Mayall Plays John Mayall, recorded in December 1964 and released in 1965. After this, the band released a single called "Crocodile Walk", with "Blues City Shakedown" as the B-side, which was produced by Tony Clarke of Decca Records. Dean then left the group and was replaced by Clapton.

The group lost their record contract with Decca that year, which also saw the release of a single called "I'm Your Witchdoctor" (produced by Jimmy Page) in October 1965, the first credited to John Mayall & the Bluesbreakers, followed by a return to Decca in 1966. Then in August 1966 Mayall and Clapton released the single "Lonely Years", with the B-side "Bernard Jenkins", which was released by Purdah Records. The album Blues Breakers with Eric Clapton was released in July; it reached the Top Ten in the UK.

Shortly after Blues Breakers with Eric Clapton was released, Clapton saw Buddy Guy in concert and, being impressed by his trio, the idea for Cream was formed, and he left to form this new group with Ginger Baker and Jack Bruce. Clapton was replaced by Peter Green for the album A Hard Road, which was recorded with McVie on bass and Aynsley Dunbar on drums. Then the same line-up served as backing band for the album Eddie Boyd and His Blues Band Featuring Peter Green. After this, Green left to form Fleetwood Mac.

Mick Taylor then joined the group, and they recorded Crusade on 12 July 1967. Soon after, McVie joined Fleetwood Mac and was replaced by Tony Reeves for the album Bare Wires, which was their highest-charting UK album. Then Reeves, Dick Heckstall-Smith and Jon Hiseman left to form Colosseum. Following a further album, Blues from Laurel Canyon, Taylor then left to join the Rolling Stones, and the name "Bluesbreakers" was dropped from Mayall albums.

By the time the 1960s were over, the Bluesbreakers had finally achieved some success in the United States.

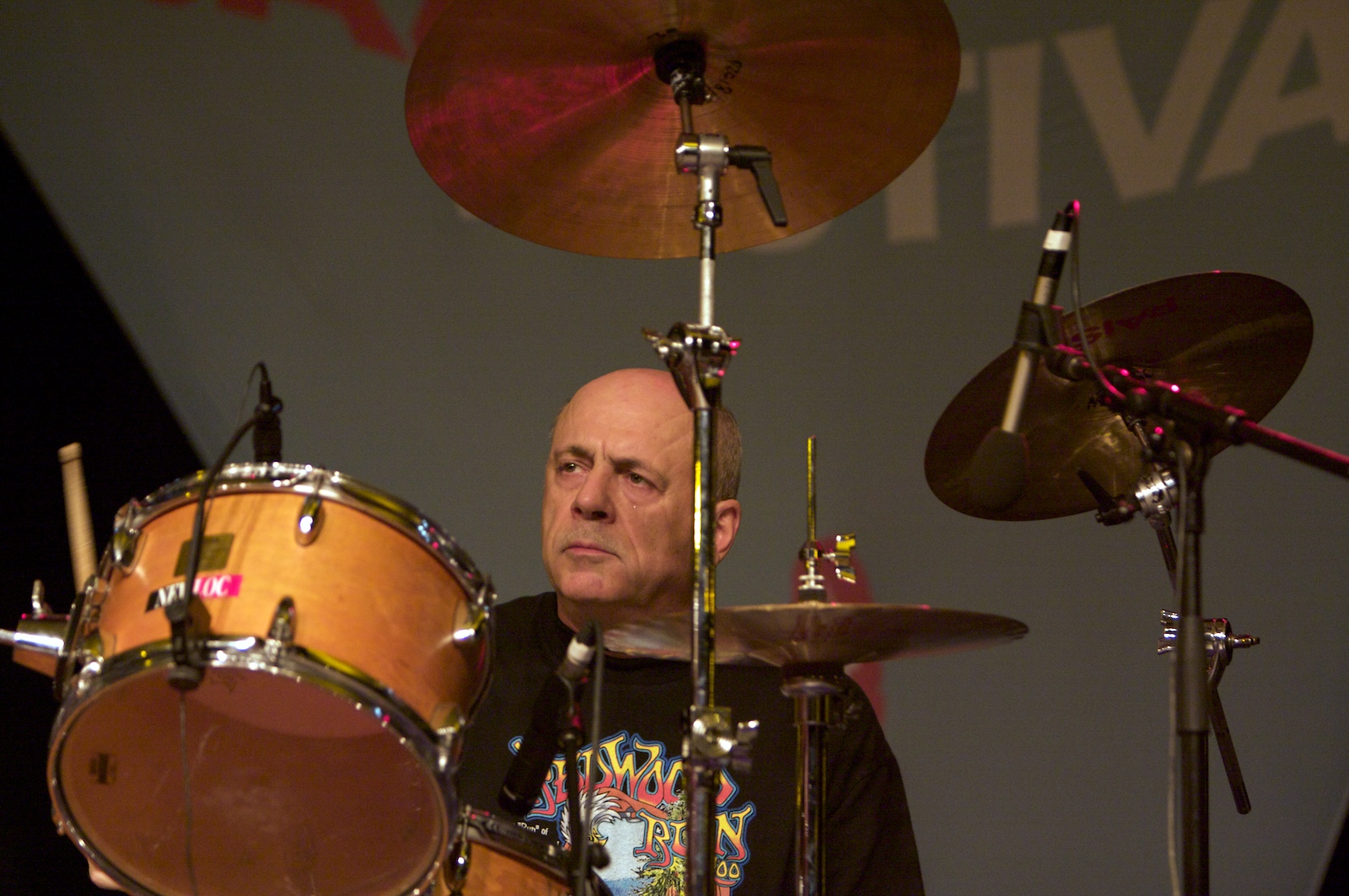
Joe Yuele, drummer with the band, 2008

With some interruptions, the Bluesbreakers have continued to tour and release albums (over 50 to date), though they never achieved the critical or popular acclaim of their earlier material. In 2003, Clapton, Taylor and Chris Barber reunited with the band for Mayall's 70th Birthday Concert in Liverpool—the concert was later released on CD and DVD. In 2004, their lineup included Buddy Whittington, Joe Yuele, Hank Van Sickle and Tom Canning, and the band toured the UK with Taylor as a guest musician.

In November 2008, Mayall announced on his website he was disbanding the Bluesbreakers, to cut back on his heavy workload and give himself freedom to work with other musicians. A 2009 solo tour with Rocky Athas (formerly of Black Oak Arkansas) was the first musical venture Mayall undertook after disbanding the band. Former band member Johnny Almond died on 18 November 2009 from cancer, aged 63.

In 2009, Eagle Records asked Mayall for a new album, and he put together a solo band including Athas (guitar), Tom Canning (keyboard), Greg Rzab (bass) and Jay Davenport (percussion) and produced the album Tough the same year. After a year, Canning left because of other priorities.

John Mayall died on 22 July 2024 at the age of 90, effectively ending the band.

== Members ==
Final lineup

- John Mayall – vocals, keyboards, harmonica, rhythm guitar (1963–2024; died in 2024)
- Jay Davenport – drums, percussion (2009–2024)
- Greg Rzab – bass, double bass (1999–2000, 2009–2024)
- Carolyn Wonderland – lead guitar, vocals (2018–2024)

== Discography ==
Studio albums

- Blues Breakers with Eric Clapton (1966)
- A Hard Road (1967)
- John Mayall's Bluesbreakers with Paul Butterfield EP (1967)
- Crusade (1967)
- Bare Wires (1968)
- Blues from Laurel Canyon (1968)
- Empty Rooms (1969)
- Return of the Bluesbreakers (1985)
- Chicago Line (1988)
- A Sense of Place (1990)
- Cross Country Blues (1992)
- Wake Up Call (1993)
- Spinning Coin (1995)
- Blues for the Lost Days (1997)
- Padlock on the Blues (1999)
- UK Tour 2K – Recorded LIVE in England May 2000 (John Mayall & the Bluesbreakers - Private Stash Records) (2001)
- No Days Off – Recorded LIVE in England May 2002 (John Mayall & the Bluesbreakers - Private Stash Records) (2003)
- Stories (2002)
- Road Dogs (2005)
- In the Palace of the King (2007)
- Historic LIVE Shows Volume 3 - Recorded LIVE in Houston Texas November 1997 And Holland July 1998 (John Mayall & the Bluesbreakers - Private Stash Records) (2012)

== See also ==
- Category: John Mayall & the Bluesbreakers albums
- Marshall Bluesbreaker
