= Blues Breakers with Eric Clapton =

Blues Breakers
- Album cover with band members. L–R John Mayall, Eric Clapton, John McVie and Hughie Flint

Studio album by John Mayall with Eric Clapton
- Released: 22 July 1966
- Recorded: May 1966
- Studios: Decca, London
- Genres: Blues rock; blues
- Length: 37:39
- Label: Decca
- Producer: Mike Vernon

John Mayall chronology
John Mayall Plays John Mayall (1965)	Blues Breakers (1966)	A Hard Road (1967)

Singles from Blues Breakers with Eric Clapton
- 1. "Key to Love" Released: 1966

Blues Breakers, colloquially known as The Beano Album, is the debut studio album by the English blues rock band John Mayall & the Bluesbreakers, originally credited to John Mayall with Eric Clapton. Produced by Mike Vernon and released in 1966 by Decca Records (UK) and London Records (US), it pioneered a guitar-dominated blues-rock sound.

The album was commercially successful and most critics viewed it positively. In 2003 and 2012, Rolling Stone ranked it number 195 on its list of the "500 Greatest Albums of All Time". It was voted number 391 in Colin Larkin's All Time Top 1000 Albums (2000).

== Background ==
After the release of Mayall's first album, the live John Mayall Plays John Mayall, Eric Clapton joined the group as the lead guitarist. Mayall originally intended for his second album to also be a live one in order to capture the guitar solos performed by Clapton. A set was recorded at the Flamingo Club, with Jack Bruce (with whom Clapton would subsequently work in Cream) on bass. The recordings, however, were of poor quality and were not used, although one song, "Stormy Monday" was included on Mayall's retrospective Looking Back (1969).

== Recording ==
With the original plan of a live album now discarded, John Mayall & the Bluesbreakers recorded Blues Breakers at Decca Studios, West Hampstead, London, in May 1966. The guitar that Eric Clapton used during these sessions was a sunburst 1960 Gibson Les Paul Standard with two PAF humbucking pickups. It was stolen in 1966 and its whereabouts remain unknown. Blues-rock guitarist Joe Bonamassa claims to have been told the guitar is in a private collection in the eastern United States. He also asserts that it is a 1959 model rather than 1960 model. The guitar became known as the "Blues Breaker" or "Beano" Les Paul, and a replica was issued by Gibson in 2012. Critics consider Clapton's guitar tone and playing on this album to be influential in the artistic and commercial development of rock-styled guitar playing.

The band on this album includes Mayall on piano, Hammond organ, harmonica, and most vocals; bassist John McVie; drummer Hughie Flint; and Clapton. Augmenting the band was a horn section added during post-production, with Alan Skidmore, Johnny Almond, and Derek Healey.

== Musical style ==
The album consists of blues standards by well-known artists, such as Otis Rush, Freddie King and Robert Johnson, as well as a few originals penned by Mayall and Clapton. Most tracks serve as a showcase for Clapton's playing. Although he provided some co- and backing vocals with his former group, the Yardbirds, "Ramblin' on My Mind" is Clapton's first solo lead vocal to be recorded.

== Artwork ==
The album is often called The Beano Album by fans because of its cover photograph showing Eric Clapton reading The Beano, a British children's comic. Clapton stated in his autobiography that he was reading The Beano on the cover because he felt like being "uncooperative" during the photo shoot. David Wedgbury took the photograph near the Old Kent Road.

== Reception ==
Professional ratings
Review scores
Source	Rating
AllMusic	5/5 stars
About.com	5/5 stars
The Virgin Encyclopedia of the Blues	5/5 stars
BBC	(Highly Positive)
Chicago Tribune	4/4 stars
Encyclopedia of Popular Music	5/5 stars
The Penguin Guide to Blues Recordings	3.5/4 stars

It was voted number 391 in the third edition of Colin Larkin's All Time Top 1000 Albums (2000). In 2003 the album was ranked number 195 on Rolling Stone magazine's list of The 500 Greatest Albums of All Time, maintaining the rating in a 2012 revised list.

Robert Dimery included the album in his book 1001 Albums You Must Hear Before You Die. Apart from being one of the most influential blues albums, it also started the now-iconic combination of a Gibson Les Paul guitar through a overdriven Marshall Bluesbreaker amplifier.

== Track listing ==
=== Original album ===
Details taken from the original London Records (US) LP record album (the Decca (UK) album does not list running times); other releases may show different information.

Side one
No.	Title	Writer(s)	Length
1.	"All Your Love"	Otis Rush	3:33
2.	"Hide Away" (instrumental)	Freddie King, Sonny Thompson	3:15
3.	"Little Girl"	Mayall	2:35
4.	"Another Man"	Mayall	1:45
5.	"Double Crossing Time"	Eric Clapton, Mayall	3:02
6.	"What'd I Say"	Ray Charles	4:25

Side two
No.	Title	Writer(s)	Length
1.	"Key to Love"	Mayall	2:06
2.	"Parchman Farm"	Mose Allison	2:20
3.	"Have You Heard"	Mayall	5:55
4.	"Ramblin' on My Mind" (Clapton on vocals)	Robert Johnson	3:07
5.	"Steppin' Out" (instrumental)	L.C. Frazier a.k.a. Memphis Slim	2:30
6.	"It Ain't Right"	Marion Walter Jacobs a.k.a. Little Walter	2:40

=== 1998 remastered European reissue on the Deram label ===
Includes all tracks in both mono and stereo: 1–12 as above in mono, 13–24 as 1–12 above in stereo. Also issued by Universal Japan, on the Decca label, in 2001.

=== 2001 American reissue on the Deram label ===
Also includes two bonus tracks from a 1966 UK single on Purdah Records:

13. "Lonely Years" (Mayall) – 3:21
14. "Bernard Jenkins" (Clapton) – 3:48

=== 40th anniversary Deluxe Edition (Decca) (2006) ===
Disc one
1–12: original album in mono
13–24: original album in stereo
Disc two

1. "Crawling up a Hill" (Mayall) – 2:08
2. "Crocodile Walk" (Mayall) – 2:23
3. "Bye Bye Bird" (Sonny Boy Williamson, Willie Dixon) – 2:49
4. "I'm Your Witchdoctor" (Mayall) – 2:11
5. "Telephone Blues" (Mayall) – 3:57
6. "Bernard Jenkins" (Clapton) – 3:49
7. "Lonely Years" (Mayall) – 3:19
8. "Cheatin' Woman" (Mayall) – 2:03
9. "Nowhere to Turn" (Mayall) – 1:42
10. "I'm Your Witchdoctor" (Mayall) – 2:10
11. "On Top of the World (Stereo mix)" (Mayall) – 2:34
12. "Key to Love" (Mayall) – 2:02
13. "On Top of the World" (Mayall) – 2:34
14. "They Call It Stormy Monday" (T-Bone Walker) – 4:35
15. "(Intro) Maudie" (John Lee Hooker, Mayall) – 2:27
16. "It Hurts to Be in Love" (Dixon, Toombs) – 3:22
17. "Have You Ever Loved a Woman" (Myles) – 6:44
18. "Bye Bye Bird" (Williamson, Dixon) – 3:51
19. "Hoochie Coochie Man" (Dixon) – 3:53

Recording locations (disc two)
1–3: BBC Saturday Club session
4–7: appeared as singles (A and B sides)
8–10: BBC Saturday Club session
11: unreleased track (stereo mix)
12–13: BBC Saturday Club session
14: live track (recorded 3/17/66 at the Flamingo Club, London) from Looking Back
15–19: live tracks (recorded 3/17/66 at the Flamingo Club, London) from Primal Solos

== Personnel ==
Blues Breakers

- John Mayall – vocals, piano, organ, harmonica
- Eric Clapton – guitar, vocals on "Ramblin' on My Mind"
- John McVie – bass guitar
- Hughie Flint – drums

Horn section on tracks 7, 9, 11

- Alan Skidmore – tenor saxophone
- Johnny Almond – baritone saxophone (also on track 5)
- Derek Healey – trumpet (original album sleeve erroneously shows "Dennis Healey")

Additional musicians

- Geoff Krivit – guitar (disc two tracks 8–10, not featured on original album)
- Jack Bruce – bass (disc two tracks 14–19, not featured on original album)

Production

- Gus Dudgeon – engineer
- Mike Vernon – producer

== Charts ==
Chart (1966)	Peak position
UK (UK Album Chart)	6

== Certifications ==
Region	Certification	Certified units/sales
United Kingdom (BPI)	Gold	100,000^{^}
^{^} Shipments figures based on certification alone.

== Sources ==
- Clapton, Eric (2007). Clapton: The Autobiography. New York City: Broadway Books. ISBN 978-0-7679-2536-5.
- Dimery, Robert; Lydon, Michael (2010). 1001 Albums You Must Hear Before You Die (Revised and Updated ed.). Universe. ISBN 978-0-7893-2074-2.
- Hjort, Christopher (9 February 2007). Strange Brew. Jawbone. ISBN 978-1-906002-00-8.
- Maloof, Rich (2004). Jim Marshall, Father of Loud: The Story of the Man Behind the World's Most Famous Guitar Amplifiers. Hal Leonard. ISBN 978-0-87930-803-2.
- Roberty, Mark (1993). Slowhand: The Complete Life and Times of Eric Clapton. New York City: Crown Trade Paperbacks. ISBN 0-517-88118-7.
- Schumacher, Michael (2003). Crossroads: The Life and Music of Eric Clapton. New York City: Citadel Press. ISBN 978-0806524665.
- Slaven, Neil (1966). Bluesbreakers with Eric Clapton (Album liner notes). John Mayall & the Bluesbreakers. New York City: London Records. LL 3492.
