= John Mayall Plays John Mayall =

Live album by John Mayall & the Bluesbreakers
- Released: March 26, 1965
- Recorded: 7 December 1964
- Venue: Klooks Kleek, West Hampstead, London
- Genre: Blues, rhythm and blues
- Length: 34:50
- Label: Decca
- Producer: Tony Clarke

John Mayall & the Bluesbreakers chronology
| John Mayall Plays John Mayall (1965) | Blues Breakers with Eric Clapton (1966) |

John Mayall Plays John Mayall is a live album and the first release by John Mayall & the Bluesbreakers, issued in 1965 on Decca Records. It was recorded live at the Klooks Kleek club in West Hampstead, London, on 7 December 1964. Guitarist Roger Dean stated that sound cables were run for 100 yards out of the window of the club to Decca Studios, which was two buildings away.

Professional ratings
Review scores
| Source | Rating |
|---|---|
| AllMusic | 3/5 stars |

== Track listing ==
All tracks written by John Mayall except where otherwise indicated.

1. "Crawling Up a Hill" - 2:21
2. "I Wanna Teach You Everything" - 3:05
3. "When I'm Gone" (Smokey Robinson) - 3:08
4. "I Need Your Love" (Walter Spriggs, Willie Spriggs) - 4:08
5. "The Hoot Owl" - 2:35
6. "R&B Time" ["Night Train" (Jimmy Forrest, Lewis C. Simpkins, Oscar Washington) / "Lucille" (Al Collins, Richard Penniman)] - 2:15
7. "Crocodile Walk" - 2:26
8. "What's the Matter with You" - 2:34
9. "Doreen" - 2:46
10. "Runaway" - 2:25
11. "Heartache" - 2:57
12. "Chicago Line" - 4:10

2006 Decca Remastered Edition bonus tracks

1. "Crawling Up a Hill" - 2:15
2. "Mr. James" - 2:49
3. "Crocodile Walk" - 2:14
4. "Blues City Shakedown" - 2:22
5. "My Baby Is Sweeter" - 2:59

== Personnel ==
John Mayall & the Bluesbreakers

- John Mayall – vocals, harmonica, "cembalett" (Cembalet electric piano), organ, 9-string guitar
- Roger Dean – guitar
- John McVie – bass guitar
- Hughie Flint – drums

with:

- Nigel Stanger – tenor saxophone, slide saxophone
