= The 1982 Reunion Concert =

Live album by John Mayall and the Bluesbreakers
- Released: 1994
- Recorded: 17 June 1982
- Venue: The Wax Museum, Washington D.C.
- Genre: Blues
- Length: 56:40
- Label: Repertoire
- Producer: John Mayall, Don Nix

John Mayall and the Bluesbreakers chronology
Cross Country Blues (1992)	The 1982 Reunion Concert (1994)	Spinning Coin (1995)

Professional ratings
Review scores
Source	Rating
AllMusic	2/5 stars

The 1982 Reunion Concert is a live album from a concert by British blues musician John Mayall. His sidemen are Mick Taylor on guitar, John McVie on bass and Colin Allen on drums. The concert took place at the Wax Museum, Washington DC, on 17 June 1982. It was released in 1994 by Repertoire Records as a CD credited to John Mayall and the Bluesbreakers.

During the first two decades of his career John Mayall has been constantly experimenting with band formats and various musicians. In 1982 he teamed up with three musicians from his previous line-ups and toured briefly in America and Australia. At that time all of them were residing in the US. Mick Taylor had left the Rolling Stones and was pursuing a solo career. John McVie had taken time off from his band Fleetwood Mac. Colin Allen, after disbanding Stone the Crows, had been a member of Focus. There is no evidence of studio recordings with this personnel, but another live performance with guest bluesmen (Albert King, Buddy Guy, Sippie Wallace, Junior Wells etc.) has been released on video as Blues Alive. For contractual reasons, John Mayall did not release any new material during the first half of the 1980s. The CD and the video both appeared in the early 1990s, when Mayall had regained some of his popularity with a new incarnation of his 'Bluesbreakers'. More recordings from the tour were released in 2011.

== Track listing ==
All tracks composed by John Mayall; except where noted

1. "Hard Times Again" (4:54)
2. "You Never Can Be Trusted" (3:57)
3. "Howlin' Moon" (4:15)
4. "Ridin' on the Santa Fe" (3:34)
5. "I Should Know Better" (Mayall, Mick Taylor) (5:25)
6. "My Time After Awhile" (Bob Geddins, Ron Badger) (5:28)
7. "She Can Do It" (3:50)
8. "Lookin' for Willie" (9:29)
9. "Room to Move" (6:58)
10. "Get Me Some Dollars" (4:53)
11. "Have You Heard" (7:34)

On track 9 Mick Taylor doubles Mayall on keyboards. Tracks 2,3,4,6 and 8 appeared on the Australian release Return of The Bluesbreakers (1994), where eight tracks, from what was to become Cross Country Blues, are also included.

== Personnel ==
- John Mayall – guitar, harmonica, organ, piano, vocals
- Mick Taylor – lead guitar
- John McVie – bass guitar
- Colin Allen – drums

=== Production ===
- Don Nix – producer
- John Mayall – author, composer, liner notes, producer
- Maggie Mayall – photography
- David Hewitt – recording engineer
- John Hoier – remixing engineer
- Mark Brennan – liner notes
- Frank Gryner – remastering
