= Ten Years Are Gone =

Studio album / Live album by John Mayall
- Released: September 1973
- Studio: Sunset Sound, Los Angeles, California
- Genre: Jazz blues
- Length: 82:59
- Label: Polydor
- Producer: Don Nix

John Mayall chronology
Moving On (1972)	Ten Years Are Gone (1973)	The Latest Edition (1974)

Professional ratings
Review scores
Source	Rating
Allmusic	3/5 stars

Ten Years Are Gone is a double album by John Mayall. Record one (Tracks 1–9) was recorded at Sunset Sound, Los Angeles, and record two (Tracks 10–14) was recorded in concert at the New York Academy of Music. The album was released in 1973. Like its predecessors Jazz Blues Fusion and Moving On, it features Freddy Robinson on guitar and Blue Mitchell on trumpet.

== Track listing ==
All tracks composed by John Mayall; except where indicated

1. "Ten Years Are Gone" – 4:46
2. "Driving Till The Break of Day" – 5:03
3. "Drifting" – 4.34
4. "Better Pass You By" – 5:12
5. "California Campground" – 3:12
6. "Undecided" (Freddy Robinson) – 2:51
7. "Good Looking Stranger" – 4:23
8. "I Still Care" – 4:17
9. "Don't Hang Me Up" – 4:11
10. "Introduction" – 2:05
11. "Sitting Here Thinking" – 7:58
12. "Harmonica Free Form" – 11:36
13. "Burning Sun" – 5:10
14. "Dark of the Night" – 17:41

== Personnel ==
- John Mayall – piano, guitar, harmonica, vocals (on all tracks except 6)
- Freddy Robinson – guitar (on all tracks), vocal (track 6 only)
- Victor Gaskin – bass
- Keef Hartley – drums
- Sugarcane Harris – violin (studio album only)
- Blue Mitchell – trumpet, flugelhorn
- Red Holloway – alto & tenor saxophone, flute (studio album only)
- Fred Clark – saxophones (live album only)

Technical

- Wayne Dailey – engineer
- Leandro Correa, Andy Kent – photography

Live album recorded in late 1972.
