= Rocky Athas =

American songwriter and guitarist (born 1954)

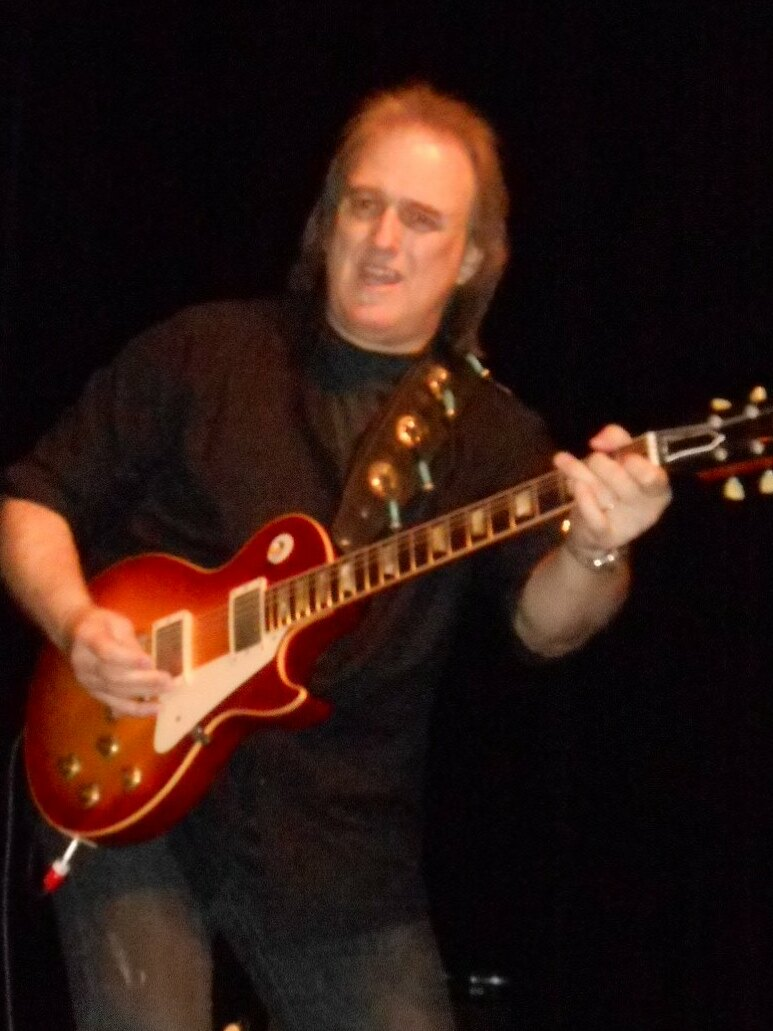
- Athas performing in 2014.

Background information
- Born: October 15, 1954 (age 71); Texas, U.S.
- Genres: Blues
- Occupations: Guitarist; songwriter
- Formerly of: Black Oak Arkansas
- Website: rockyathas.com

Rocky Athas (born October 15, 1954) is an American songwriter and guitarist, best known for his work with Black Oak Arkansas, Glenn Hughes, Buddy Miles, Double Trouble and John Mayall.

== Career ==
=== Early years ===
Rocky Athas first founded the blues band 'Lightning' that toured Texas and played as supporting act for numerous local bands. When he was 23, The Original Texas Music Magazine, BUDDY Magazine, ranked him in the Top 10 best guitarists. Rocky Athas is one of the first and youngest Texas guitarists to receive this recognition, also granted to Eric Johnson, Jimmie Vaughan, Stevie Ray Vaughan, Billy Gibbons and Johnny Winter.

=== Black Oak Arkansas ===
He then joined several acts as a lead guitarist, including Black Oak Arkansas. He wrote two of the band's greatest hits, "Ready as Hell" and "Wild Bunch". While in BOA, he met Johnnie and Tommy Bolin (Deep Purple and James Gang), who became close friends. After Tommy's death, Rocky performed tribute shows to his friend with Johnnie Bolin and Glenn Hughes (Deep Purple and Trapeze) in support of the Tommy Bolin Archives foundation. In 2009, he released A Tribute to Tommy Bolin with Glenn Hughes & Friends, a live tribute album to Tommy Bolin.

=== 2000–2010 ===
In 2000, Rocky recorded Blues Berries with Buddy Miles and Stevie Ray Vaughan's rhythm section, Double Trouble. Rocky also covered 'The Wind Cries Mary' for the album Blue Haze – Songs of Jimi Hendrix.

==== The Rocky Athas Group ====
In 2003, he founded The Rocky Athas group and released Miracle, produced by Jim Gaines, with whom he became friends while recording Blues Berries. In 2005, the band released a second album, VooDoo Moon, in collaboration with Larry Samford. In 2007, he released Lightning Strikes Twice, made up of tracks from his first band 'Lightning'.

==== John Mayall ====
In 2009, John Mayall asked him to play lead guitar on Tough. In 2014, he recorded a second album with Mayall, A Special Life. Athas intensively toured with the legendary bluesman until 2016, when John Mayall decided to operate as a trio.

=== 2011–present ===
In 2014, Rocky released Let My Guitar Do The Talking...With My Friends on Cherryburst Records. The album is instrumental, and Athas used several vintage guitars from his personal collection. His old friend Smokin' Joe Kubek and John Mayall both appeared on the album.

In 2015, Rocky released two compilations, entitled The Essential Rocky Athas (Volume I and Volume II), featuring several bonus tracks, including a cover of "'White Room" by Cream.

In 2017, Athas released Shakin' The Dust, produced by Jim Gaines (Stevie Ray Vaughan, Santana's Supernatural).

== Influences ==
Athas has been influenced by Jimi Hendrix and Eric Clapton. Other influences are Freddie King, The Beatles, Cream, Mountain and Leslie West.

== Discography ==
=== With Black Oak Arkansas ===
- 1984: Ready as Hell
- 1999: The Wild Bunch

=== With Glenn Hughes & Friends ===
- 1997: A Tribute to Tommy Bolin

=== With Buddy Miles ===
- 2002: Blues Berries

=== With The Rocky Athas Group ===
- 2003: Miracle
- 2005: VooDoo Moon
- 2007: Lightning Strikes Twice
- 2017: Shakin' the Dust

=== With John Mayall ===
- 2009: Tough
- 2011: Live in London
- 2014: A Special Life

=== Solo ===
- 1999: That's What I Know
- 2007: Rocky Athas' Lightning - Lightning Strikes Twice
- 2014: Let My Guitar Do The Talking ... with My Friends
- 2017: Shakin' The Dust
- 2024: Livin' My Best Life
