= Tough (John Mayall album) =

Studio album by John Mayall
- Released: 15 September 2009
- Recorded: 21–30 March 2009
- Studio: LAFX, North Hollywood, California
- Genre: Blues rock
- Length: 54:49
- Label: Eagle, Eagle Rock (US)
- Producer: John Mayall, Michael Aarvold, Maggie Mayall

John Mayall chronology
Live from Austin, Tx (2007)	Tough (2009)	A Special Life (2014)

Professional ratings
Review scores
Source	Rating
Allmusic	3.5/5 stars

Tough is a studio album by John Mayall. Released in 2009, the album features Jay Davenport on drums, Greg Rzab on bass, Tom Canning on keyboards and Rocky Athas on lead guitar. Mayall sings and plays harmonica, organ and guitar.

== Track listing ==
All tracks composed by John Mayall; except where indicated

1. "Nothing to Do with Love" (Jerry Lynn Williams, John F. Miller) – 5:54
2. "Just What You're Looking For" (Peter Harper) – 4:23
3. "Playing with a Losing Hand" (Walter Trout) – 4:09
4. "An Eye for An Eye" (Jeffrey Pitchell) – 4:34
5. "How Far Down" (Gary Nicholson, Kenneth Greenberg) – 5:04
6. "Train to My Heart" (David Fields) – 4:34
7. "Slow Train to Nowhere" – 4:28
8. "Numbers Down" (Andrew Winton) – 3:59
9. "That Good Old Rockin' Blues" – 4:55
10. "Tough Times Ahead" – 7:18
11. "The Sum of Something" (Curtis Salgado) – 5:31

== Personnel ==
- John Mayall – lead vocals, harmonica, piano, organ, 6- and 12-string guitars
- Maggie Mayall – backing vocals
- Rocky Athas – guitars
- Tom Canning – piano, backing vocals, organ
- Greg Rzab – bass
- Jay Davenport – drums

Other credits

- Michael Aarvold – engineer, mastering, producer
- Fabrice Demessence – photography
- Stuart Green – design
- Maggie Mayall – photography, producer, track notes
- Jeremy Olsen – photography
