= Ann Patterson =

American jazz saxophonist and bandleader (born 1946)

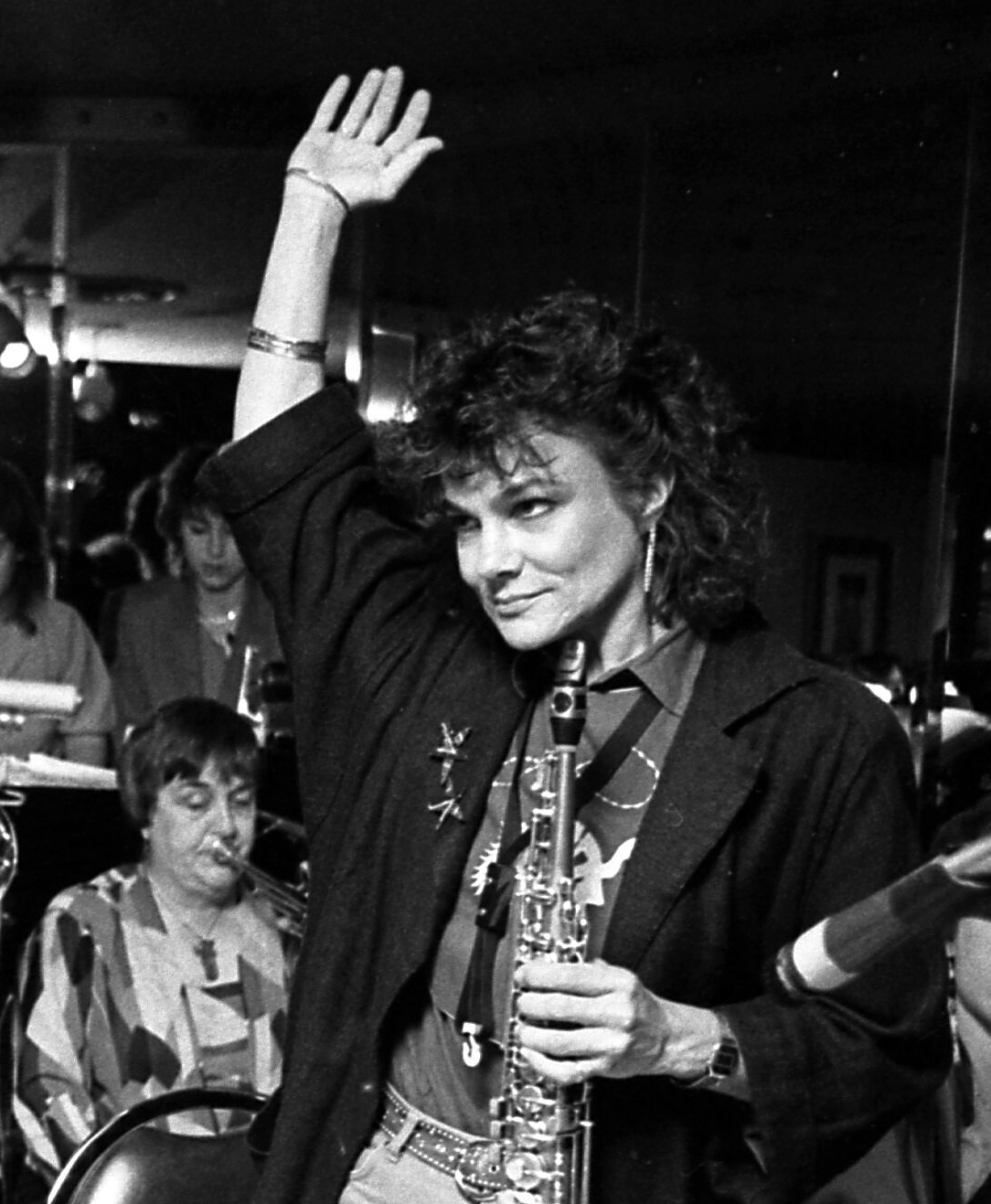
Patterson in 1986

Ann Estelle Patterson (born July 30, 1946) is an American jazz saxophonist and bandleader. She has worked extensively as a big band player and formed her own all-female big band, Maiden Voyage, in 1981, which was active into the 2000s. She earned a doctorate in jazz studies from the University of Southern California, and is currently an applied music professor at El Camino College.
