= Bare Wires =

1968 album by John Mayall & the Bluesbreakers

Studio album by John Mayall's Bluesbreakers
- Released: 21 June 1968
- Recorded: 3, 9, 24 and 30 April 1968
- Studio: Decca Studios, West Hampstead, London, England
- Genre: Blues, blues-rock, jazz rock
- Length: 45:20
- Label: Decca
- Producer: Mike Vernon, John Mayall

John Mayall's Bluesbreakers chronology
Crusade (1967)	Bare Wires (1968)

John Mayall chronology
Crusade (1967)	Bare Wires (1968)	Blues from Laurel Canyon (1968)

Professional ratings
Review scores
Source	Rating
Allmusic	3/5 stars
Rolling Stone	(negative)
Encyclopedia of Popular Music	5/5 stars
The Penguin Guide to Blues Recordings	3/4 stars

Bare Wires is a studio album by John Mayall's Bluesbreakers, featuring Mick Taylor on guitar, Chris Mercer and Dick Heckstall-Smith on saxophones, Jon Hiseman on drums, Henry Lowther on cornet and violin, and Tony Reeves on bass. It was released in 1968 on Decca Records. The album was the last John Mayall studio album to feature the name "Bluesbreakers". The album was also Mayall's first successful U.S. album, reaching #59 on the Billboard 200.

It was voted number 566 in the third edition of Colin Larkin's All Time Top 1000 Albums (2000).

== Background and recording ==
Guitarist Peter Green left the Bluesbreakers to form Fleetwood Mac, and was replaced by Mick Taylor. Shortly before recording sessions for the album, bassist Andy Fraser, who would later join Free, also left the group, while drummer Keef Hartley was replaced by Jon Hiseman. Mayall asked if anyone knew someone who could play bass guitar, and Hiseman informed him that his friend Tony Reeves, who had played double bass for most of his career, had recently bought a bass guitar. The album included more jazz influences than usual.

Reeves recalled of the album's making, "Rehearsals with John Mayall weren't really rehearsals; we didn't play very much, for a lot of the rehearsal time you sat around listening to what he wanted to do. He played records to demonstrate the feel or a style, or a sound that he was looking for. All of the things on the Bare Wires album were worked out in the studio – we must have done one or two rehearsals actually playing the music, but I can’t remember that. Seems to me, most of the work took place in the recording studio."

Following the album, Mayall pared down the group from a seven-piece to a three-piece band and ultimately dropped the Bluesbreakers entirely. Reeves, Hiseman and Dick Heckstall-Smith went on to form Colosseum.

=== Songs ===
The songs "No Reply" and "She's Too Young" were released as a single by Decca. The seven songs on the album's A-side ("Bare Wires", "Where Did I Belong", "I Started Walking", "Open Up a New Door", "Fire", "I Know Now" and "Look in the Mirror") are arranged into a medley. Some CD issues of Bare Wires combine these seven songs onto a single track with the title "Bare Wires Suite", seemingly inspired by the headline "Bare Wires: A Suite by John Mayall" which appears on the album's inner gatefold.

According to Reeves, the song "Hartley Quits" was titled after a front-page headline in Melody Maker about Keef Hartley's departure from the Bluesbreakers.

== Track listing ==
The individual track times are those printed on the original vinyl releases. Some CD issues of the album combine tracks 1–7 onto a single track under the title "Bare Wires Suite".

=== Original album ===
All tracks are written by John Mayall, except where noted.

Side one
No.	Title	Length
1.	"Bare Wires"	1:25
2.	"Where Did I Belong"	3:05
3.	"I Started Walking"	2:20
4.	"Open Up a New Door"	3:00
5.	"Fire"	3:45
6.	"I Know Now"	5:35
7.	"Look in the Mirror"	2:51

Side two
No.	Title	Length
8.	"I'm a Stranger"	5:14
9.	"No Reply" (Mayall, Mick Taylor)	3:09
10.	"Hartley Quits" (Taylor)	2:55
11.	"Killing Time"	4:48
12.	"She's Too Young"	2:22
13.	"Sandy"	3:50

Reissue bonus tracks
No.	Title	Original release	Length
14.	"Picture on the Wall"	B-side of Decca Single F12732	3:03
15.	"Jenny"	A-side of Decca Single F12732	4:40
16.	"Knockers Step Forward"	Thru the Years	3:14
17.	"Hide and Seek"	Thru the Years	2:25
18.	"(Intro) Look at the Girl"	Primal Solos	6:47
19.	"Start Walkin'"	Primal Solos	8:23

== Personnel ==
John Mayall's Bluesbreakers

- John Mayall – vocals, harmonica, piano, harpsichord, organ, harmonium, guitar

on tracks 1–13 and 16–19:

- Mick Taylor – lead guitar, Hawaiian guitar
- Chris Mercer – tenor, baritone saxophone
- Dick Heckstall-Smith – tenor, soprano saxophone
- Jon Hiseman – drums, percussion
- Henry Lowther – cornet, violin
- Tony Reeves – string bass, bass guitar

on tracks 14 and 15:

- Peter Green – guitar
- Keef Hartley – drums

Production

- Mike Vernon, John Mayall – producers
- Derek Varnals – engineer
- Pete Smith, Jan Persson – photography

== Charts ==
Chart (1968)	Peak position
UK (The Official Charts Company)	3
Norway (VG-lista)	9
France (InfoDisc)	1
US Billboard 200	59
