= Wake Up Call (John Mayall album) =

Studio album by John Mayall & the Bluesbreakers
- Released: April 6, 1993
- Recorded: 1993
- Genre: Rock, blues rock, blues
- Length: 53:14
- Label: Silverstone
- Producer: R.S. Field, Dave McNair

John Mayall & the Bluesbreakers chronology
Cross Country Blues (1992)	Wake Up Call (1993)	The 1982 Reunion Concert (1994)

Professional ratings
Review scores
Source	Rating
Allmusic	3/5 stars
The Penguin Guide to Blues Recordings	3/4 stars

Wake Up Call is an album by British bluesman John Mayall (also called a John Mayall & the Bluesbreakers album) with various special guest appearances by Buddy Guy, Mick Taylor, Mavis Staples and other musicians, released on 6 April 1993.

== Track listing ==
- All songs written by John Mayall, except where noted.
1. "Mail Order Mystics" (Chris Smither) - 4:40
2. "Maydell" (Johnny Neel, Warren Haynes) - 3:56
3. "I Could Cry" (Junior Wells) - 5:09
4. "Wake Up Call" (David Egan, David Love Lewis) - 4:12
5. "Loaded Dice" (Gary Nicholson, Wally Wilson) - 4:27
6. "Undercover Agent for the Blues" (Leanne & Tony Joe White) - 5:21
7. "Light the Fuse" - 4:14
8. "Anything I Can Say" (Brendan Croker) - 3:43
9. "Nature's Disappearing" - 4:52
10. "I'm a Sucker for Love" - 4:05
11. "Not at Home" - 4:07
12. "Ain't That Lovin' You Baby" (Jimmy Reed) - 4:12

== Personnel ==
The Bluesbreakers

- John Mayall - lead vocals, piano, harp, guitar, flute, Hammond organ
- Coco Montoya - lead and rhythm guitar
- Rick Cortes - bass guitar
- Joe Yuele - drums

Additional musicians

- Buddy Guy - vocal and lead guitar on "I Could Cry"
- Mavis Staples - vocal on "Wake Up Call"
- Mick Taylor - lead guitar on "Wake Up Call" and "Not at Home"
- Albert Collins - lead guitar on "Light the Fuse" and "I'm a Sucker for Love"
- David Grissom - rhythm and lead guitar
- Michael Bruno - percussion
- Joe Sublett - saxophone
- Darrell Leonard - trumpet
- Maggie Mayall - backing vocals
- Tom Canning - Hammond organ

Production

- Neal Avron - Assistant Engineer
- R.S. Field - Producer
- John Gabrysiak - Executive Producer
- Efren Herrera - Assistant Engineer
- Ron Kaplan - Executive Producer
- Stephen Marcussen - Mastering
- Richard McLaurin - Photography
- Dave McNair - Engineer and Producer
