= Crusade (album) =

1967 album by John Mayall & the Bluesbreakers

Studio album by John Mayall's Bluesbreakers
- Released: 1 September 1967
- Recorded: 12 July 1967
- Studio: Decca West Hampstead Studios, London
- Genre: Blues rock
- Length: 45:50 (original); 79:09 (2007 reissue)
- Label: Decca (United Kingdom); London (United States)
- Producer: Mike Vernon

John Mayall's Bluesbreakers chronology
A Hard Road (1967)	Crusade (1967)	Bare Wires (1968)

John Mayall chronology
A Hard Road (1967)	Crusade (1967)	The Blues Alone (1967)

Professional ratings
Review scores
Source	Rating
Allmusic	4.5/5 stars
Rolling Stone	(Negative)
The Penguin Guide to Blues Recordings	3/4 stars

Crusade is the fourth album and third studio album by the British blues rock band John Mayall & the Bluesbreakers, released on 1 September 1967 on Decca Records. It was the follow-up to A Hard Road, also released in 1967. As with their two previous albums, Crusade was produced by Mike Vernon. The album was the first recordings of the then-18-year-old guitarist Mick Taylor.

== Track listing ==
=== Original release ===
All songs by John Mayall except as noted.

1. "Oh, Pretty Woman" (A. C. Williams) – 3:40
2. "Stand Back Baby" – 1:50
3. "My Time After Awhile" (Ron Badger, Sheldon Feinberg, Robert Geddins) – 5:15
4. "Snowy Wood" (instrumental) (Mayall, Mick Taylor) – 3:41
5. "Man of Stone" (Eddie Kirkland) – 2:29
6. "Tears in My Eyes" – 4:20
7. "Driving Sideways" (instrumental) (Freddie King, Sonny Thompson) – 4:03
8. "The Death of J. B. Lenoir" – 4:27
9. "I Can't Quit You Baby" (Willie Dixon) – 4:35
10. "Streamline" – 3:19
11. "Me and My Woman" (Gene Barge) – 4:05
12. "Checkin' Up on My Baby" (Sonny Boy Williamson II) – 3:59

=== Expanded release ===
13. "Curly (edit)" (Peter Green)
14. "Rubber Duck" (Peter Green, Aynsley Dunbar)
15. "Greeny" (Peter Green)
16. "Missing You" (Peter Green)
17. "Please Don't Tell"
18. "Your Funeral and My Trial" (Sonny Boy Williamson II)
19. "Double Trouble" (Otis Rush)
20. "It Hurts Me Too" (Mel London)
21. "Suspicions (Part One)"
22. "Suspicions (Part Two)"

== Other versions ==
An expanded edition includes ten more tracks, seven of them already available on the 1971 compilation Thru the Years, though "Curly", an energetic guitar instrumental, is edited by more than a minute on Crusade. These recordings were made with earlier lineups, except two versions of "Suspicions", recorded later with a band similar to the Crusade lineup. A remastered and expanded version of this album was scheduled for release in the UK on 6 August 2007.

== Personnel ==
John Mayall & the Bluesbreakers

- John Mayall – vocals, organ, piano, harmonica, bottleneck guitar
- Mick Taylor – lead guitar
- John McVie – bass guitar (except tracks 21–22)
- Keef Hartley – drums

with:

- Chris Mercer – tenor saxophone (except tracks 13–20)
- Rip Kant – baritone saxophone (except tracks 13–22)
- Peter Green – lead guitar (tracks 13–20)
- Aynsley Dunbar – drums (tracks 13–18)
- Mick Fleetwood – drums (tracks 19–20)
- Paul Williams – bass guitar (tracks 21–22)
- Dick Heckstall-Smith – tenor and soprano saxophone (tracks 21–22)
