= Blues from Laurel Canyon =

1968 studio album by John Mayall

Studio album by John Mayall
- Released: November 1968
- Recorded: 26–28 August 1968
- Studios: Decca Studios, London
- Genre: Electric blues
- Length: 47:59 (original); 61:11 (2007 reissue)
- Labels: Decca (UK); London (U.S.)
- Producers: Mike Vernon, John Mayall

John Mayall chronology
Bare Wires (1968)	Blues from Laurel Canyon (1968)	The Turning Point (1969)

Professional ratings
Review scores
Source	Rating
Allmusic	4.5/5 stars
The Penguin Guide to Blues Recordings	2.5/4 stars

Blues from Laurel Canyon is a 1968 album by John Mayall, featuring British blues music. It was his first album after the breakup of his band the Bluesbreakers in May 1968.. It was also his last album with Decca before moving to Polydor.

== Background ==
John Mayall sings and plays harmonica, organ and guitar on the album. The other band members are a young Mick Taylor (guitar), Colin Allen (drums) and Stephen Thompson (bass). The guitarist Peter Green is featured on the track "First Time Alone". The album was the final Mayall record before Taylor joined the Rolling Stones. The engineer was Derek Varnals. All the songs on the album were written by Mayall.

The title of the album derives from Laurel Canyon, California, United States (in the Los Angeles area) where John Mayall subsequently lived from 1969 to 1979. It forms a record of his visit there before moving to the U.S. on a more permanent basis. The area was favoured by many musicians at the time. It was recorded at Decca Studios in West Hampstead, London, England between 26 and 28 August 1968, and was released on the Decca label. The album peaked at number 33 in the UK Albums Chart.

A remastered and expanded version of this album was released in the United Kingdom in August 2007.

== Track listing ==
All songs composed by John Mayall.

=== Original tracks ===
1. "Vacation" – 2:47
2. "Walking on Sunset" – 2:50
3. "Laurel Canyon Home" – 4:33
4. "2401" – 3:42
5. "Ready to Ride" – 3:32
6. "Medicine Man" – 2:43
7. "Somebody's Acting Like a Child" – 3:27
8. "The Bear" – 4:40
9. "Miss James" – 2:30
10. "First Time Alone" – 4:49
11. "Long Gone Midnight" – 3:27
12. "Fly Tomorrow" – 9:00

=== Bonus tracks ===
13. "2401" – 3:56 (Single version)
14. "Wish You Were Mine" – 8:36 (Live '68, previously on Primal Solos)

== Personnel ==
- John Mayall – guitar, harmonica, keyboards, vocals, artwork, design
- Mick Taylor – guitar, pedal steel guitar
- Colin Allen – drums, tabla
- Steve Thompson – bass guitar
- Peter Green – guitar on "First Time Alone"

Technical

- Derek Varnals – engineer
- Adrian Martins – assistant engineer
- Dominique Tarlé, Stephen C. LaVere, Rob Bosboom – photography
