= The Collectors Colosseum =

The Collectors' Colosseum

Compilation album by Colosseum
- Released: 1971
- Recorded: 1968–1970
- Genre: Rock
- Length: 38:43
- Label: Bronze
- Producer: Jon Hiseman, Gerry Bron

The Collectors' Colosseum is a compilation album by Colosseum that was released in England in 1971.

== Track listing ==
1. "Jumping off the Sun" - 3:40, originally recorded late in 1969, with Chris Farlowe's vocals overdubbed over Dave Clempson's originals. In addition, there are extra guitar overdubs by Clempson.
2. "Those about to Die" - 4:52, excerpt from their first LP
3. "I Can't Live Without You" – 4:15, recorded 1968
4. "Beware The Ides of March" - 5:53, from their first LP
5. "Walking in the Park" – 3:55, idem
6. "Bolero" – 5:29, recorded late in 1969
7. "Rope Ladder to the Moon" - 3:22, recorded late in 1969 and composed by Jack Bruce
8. "The Grass is Greener" - 7:37, recorded late in 1969

== Personnel ==
- On tracks 2, 3, 4, and 5 : Jon Hiseman on drums, Dick Heckstall-Smith on saxes, Dave Greenslade on organ, Tony Reeves on bass, James Litherland on guitar & vocals.
- On tracks 6 and 8 : Jon Hiseman on drums, Dick Heckstall-Smith on saxes, Dave Greenslade on organ, Tony Reeves on bass, Dave Clempson on guitar and vocals.
- On track 1 : Jon Hiseman on drums, Dick Heckstall-Smith on saxes, Dave Greenslade on organ, Tony Reeves on bass, Dave Clempson on guitar and vocals, Chris Farlowe on vocals.
