= The Grass Is Greener (album) =

Studio album by Colosseum
- Released: January 1970
- Recorded: Summer/Winter 1969
- Genre: Progressive rock
- Length: 38:30
- Label: Dunhill
- Producers: Tony Reeves, Gerry Bron

Colosseum chronology
Valentyne Suite (1969)	The Grass Is Greener (1970)	Daughter of Time (1970)

The Grass Is Greener is an album by Colosseum, released in January 1970.

In contrast to other albums by Colosseum, The Grass Is Greener was released only in the United States and Canada, on the Dunhill label, distributed by ABC. It was conceived as a North American alternative to November 1969's Valentyne Suite, complete with a muted, blue-green variation of the aforementioned album's cover. It features four tracks recorded with then-new guitarist/vocalist Clem Clempson in the winter of 1969 ("Jumping Off the Sun", "Lost Angeles", "Rope Ladder to the Moon", "Bolero"); three tracks from the 1969 Vertigo LP Valentyne Suite but with vocal and guitar parts provided by Clempson ("Butty's Blues", "The Machine Demands a Sacrifice", "The Grass Is Greener") instead of James Litherland; and one track, "Elegy", that appears to be the same as the original from Valentyne Suite, including Litherland's vocal. The record was remastered and released as a bonus disc in Sanctuary Records' 2003 deluxe CD edition of Valentyne Suite.

== Reception ==
Professional ratings
Review scores
Source	Rating
AllMusic	3.5/5 stars
Babyblaue Seiten	10/15 stars

In a review of The Grass Is Greener at AllMusic, Jim Newsom said he was "impress[ed]" with Dick Heckstall-Smith's saxophones and woodwinds, and Dave Clempson's "blazing guitar licks". Newsom found "Jumping off the Sun" and Jack Bruce's "Rope Ladder to the Moon", "especially strong", and called the title track the "highlight of this disc".

Achim Breiling wrote at Babyblaue Seiten that in contrast to its predecessor, Valentyne Suite, The Grass Is Greener is a well balanced and diverse album. Breiling opined that, except for "Jumping off the Sun", which he felt is a little too "poppy", all the tracks are "beautiful", bluesy-jazz-rock songs, and some of Colosseum's best recorded numbers.

== Track listing ==
Side one
No.	Title	Writer(s)	Length
1.	"Jumping Off the Sun"	Mike Taylor, Dave Tomlin	3:00
2.	"Lost Angeles"	Dave Greenslade, Dick Heckstall-Smith	5:30
3.	"Elegy"	James Litherland	3:26
4.	"Butty's Blues"	Litherland	6:45

Side two
No.	Title	Writer(s)	Length
5.	"Rope Ladder to the Moon"	Pete Brown, Jack Bruce	3:42
6.	"Bolero"	Maurice Ravel	5:28
7.	"The Machine Demands a Sacrifice"	Brown, Jon Hiseman, Litherland	2:48
8.	"The Grass Is Greener"	Heckstall-Smith, Hiseman	7:31

== Personnel ==
- Dave Greenslade – organ, keyboards, vocals
- Dick Heckstall-Smith – saxophone
- Jon Hiseman – drums
- Dave "Clem" Clempson – guitar, vocals
- Tony Reeves – bass
- James Litherland – vocals (on "Elegy")
