= Supershow =

1969 film directed by John Crome

- DVD cover
- Directed by: John Crome
- Cinematography: Mike Molloy
- Edited by: Ted Hooker
- Production company: Cinétel
- Release date: 1970
- Running time: 70 minutes
- Country: United Kingdom
- Language: English

Supershow (later with the subtitle "The Last Great Jam of the 60's!") is a 1969 music documentary film directed by John Crome and produced by Tom Parkinson. Tom Keylock, the Rolling Stones road manager was another figure pivotal in the production of the show.

== Production ==
The project was instigated by the Colour Tel film company, the recent credits of which included The Rolling Stones Rock and Roll Circus and Jimi Hendrix at Royal Albert Hall.

Filming took place over a two-day period in March 1969 in a disused linoleum factory at Staines, England. Artists who were filmed on 25 March included Led Zeppelin, Buddy Guy, Jack Bruce, Buddy Miles, Dick Heckstall-Smith and Chris Mercer. Those filmed on 26 March included Eric Clapton, Jon Hiseman's Colosseum, Buddy Guy, Roland Kirk and Stephen Stills. This project also marks one of the rare film appearances of Glenn Ross Campbell and The Misunderstood. Allegedly Jimi Hendrix was due to appear but missed the plane from New York City.

The whole project was planned with great secrecy and filming went ahead at a reputed cost of £100 per minute.

The film received a limited run in London, premiering at the Lyceum Theatre in November 1969. It later emerged as an official video release by Virgin Vision in 1986.

Footage of Led Zeppelin's performance of the song "Dazed and Confused" which was originally filmed for Supershow later appeared on the Led Zeppelin DVD in 2003.

== Track listing ==
| No. | Title | Writer(s) | Performer(s) | Length |
|---|---|---|---|---|
| 1. | "Those Who Are About to Die Salute You" | Dave Greenslade, Dick Heckstall-Smith, Jon Hiseman, Tony Reeves | Jon Hiseman's Colosseum |
| 2. | "Love Potions" | | Buddy Miles, Stephen Stills, Jack Bruce, Dallas Taylor, Dick Heckstall-Smith, Chris Mercer |
| 3. | "Under the Jasmin Tree" | John Lewis | Modern Jazz Quartet |
| 4. | "Mary Had a Little Lamb" | Traditional, Music by Buddy Guy | Buddy Guy, Jack Bruce, Buddy Miles |
| 5. | "Primitive Ohio" | Rahsaan Roland Kirk | Roland Kirk Quartet |
| 6. | "Dazed and Confused" | Jimmy Page, inspired by Jake Holmes | Led Zeppelin |
| 7. | "Checking on My Baby / Texas Blues" | Sonny Boy Williamson II | Buddy Miles, Glenn Campbell, Buddy Guy, Stephen Hoard, Chris Mercer |
| 8. | "Visitor from Venus" | John Lewis | Modern Jazz Quartet |
| 9. | "Bad Hat" | | Glenn Campbell with The Misunderstood |
| 10. | "Hoochie Coochie Man" | Willie Dixon | Buddy Guy |
| 11. | "Debut" | Dave Greenslade, Dick Heckstall-Smith, Jon Hiseman, Tony Reeves | Jon Hiseman's Colosseum |
| 12. | "Crossroads" | Robert Johnson | Stephen Stills, Buddy Miles, Dallas Taylor |
| 13. | "Stormy Monday / Kansas City" | T-Bone Walker / Jerry Leiber and Mike Stoller | Buddy Guy, Roland Kirk, Jack Bruce, Jimmy Hopps, Rahn Burton |
| 14. | "I Say a Little Prayer" | Burt Bacharach, Hal David | Roland Kirk Quartet |
| 15. | "My Time After a While" | Ron Badger, Sheldon Feinberg, Robert Geddins | Buddy Guy, Jack Bruce, Buddy Miles |
| 16. | "Black Queen" | Stephen Stills | Stephen Stills, Buddy Miles, Jack Bruce |
| 17. | "Slate 27" | | Eric Clapton, Roland Kirk, Dick Heckstall-Smith, Jack Bruce, Jon Hiseman, Rahn Burton, Vernon Martin |
| 18. | "End Jam" | | Eric Clapton, Buddy Guy, Stephen Stills, Duster Bennett, Plus Others |
| Total length: | | | | 70:49 |
