= Colosseum Live =

Live album by Colosseum
- Released: June 1971
- Recorded: 18 & 27 March 1971
- Venues: Manchester University; The Big Apple, Brighton
- Genres: Jazz fusion, blues-rock
- Length: 73:48
- Labels: Bronze (UK); Warner Bros. (U.S.)
- Producers: Gerry Bron, Jon Hiseman, Colosseum

Colosseum chronology
Daughter of Time (1970)	Colosseum Live (1971)	Colosseum LiveS - The Reunion Concerts (1994)

Colosseum Live is a live album by Colosseum, released in 1971. It was one of the band's most commercially successful albums, remaining in the UK Albums Chart for six weeks and peaking at number 17. The album peaked at number 48 in Australia in 1972. It was their first album to chart in the United States, reaching No. 192 there.

== Overview ==
This album was recorded at Manchester University (18 March 1971) and the Big Apple, Brighton (27 March 1971), on the Daughter of Time tour. After Colosseum Live, the band broke up for 23 years and reunited in 1994 with exactly the same line-up.

== Reception ==
Professional ratings
Review scores
Source	Rating
Allmusic	3.5/5 stars

Allmusic wrote that "With good material, some towering performances, and a powerful atmosphere, this is everything you could hope for from a live album." They made note of the performances of all the players except Dave Greenslade, and commented that the band arrangements, duets during the fills, and the way solos flow from one to the other are all interesting and effective.

== Track listing ==
1. "Rope Ladder to the Moon" (Pete Brown, Jack Bruce) – 9:43
2. "Walking in the Park" (Graham Bond) – 8:21
3. "Skelington" (Dave Clempson, Jon Hiseman) – 14:52
4. "Tanglewood '63" (Mike Gibbs) – 10:12
5. "Encore... "Stormy Monday Blues"" (T-Bone Walker) – 7:29
6. "Lost Angeles" (Dave Greenslade, Dick Heckstall-Smith, Chris Farlowe) – 15:43
7. "I Can't Live Without You" (James Litherland) – 7:28 [Bonus Track on later edition CD]

== Personnel ==
Colosseum

- Mark Clarke - bass, vocals
- Dave "Clem" Clempson - guitars, vocals
- Chris Farlowe - vocals
- Dave Greenslade - organ, vibraphone
- Dick Heckstall-Smith - saxophones
- Jon Hiseman - drums

== Charts ==
Chart (1971–72)	Peak position
Australian Albums (Kent Music Report)	48
UK Albums (Official Charts)	17
Billboard Top LPs	192
