= Daughter of Time (album) =

Studio album by Colosseum
- Released: November 1970
- Recorded: Summer 1970
- Venues: Royal Albert Hall, London ("The Time Machine", 2 July 1970)
- Studios: Lansdowne, London (all other tracks)
- Genres: Jazz rock; progressive rock
- Length: 38:04
- Labels: Vertigo (UK); Dunhill (U.S.)
- Producer: Gerry Bron

Colosseum chronology
The Grass Is Greener (1970)	Daughter of Time (1970)	Colosseum Live (1971)

Daughter of Time is the fourth album by English jazz rock band Colosseum, released in 1970. The album remained for five weeks in the UK Albums Chart peaking number 23. Recorded in the midst of an upheaval in the band's lineup, only one of its eight tracks, "Three Score and Ten, Amen", features all six of the official band members.

== Background ==
The song "Downhill and Shadows" was named by co-writer Jon Hiseman from a quote by actor Robert Mitchum.

== Reception ==
Professional ratings
Review scores
Source	Rating
Allmusic	3/5 stars

Mike DeGagne gave the album a rave retrospective review in Allmusic, chiefly praising the wide variety of instruments used, but also acknowledging the melancholy tones and sense of drama. His only criticism was that the songs are too short, "all around six minutes in length" (in fact, only three of the songs are around six minutes in length, with one of them being eight minutes plus while half of them are much shorter).

== Track listing ==
No.	Title	Writer(s)	Length
1.	"Three Score and Ten, Amen"	Clem Clempson, Dave Greenslade, Jon Hiseman	5:38
2.	"Time Lament"	Greenslade, Jon Hiseman	6:13
3.	"Take Me Back to Doomsday"	Clempson, Greenslade, Hiseman, Dick Heckstall-Smith	4:25
4.	"The Daughter of Time"	Barry Dennen, Greenslade, Heckstall-Smith	3:33
5.	"Theme for an Imaginary Western"	Pete Brown, Jack Bruce	4:07
6.	"Bring Out Your Dead"	Clempson, Greenslade	4:20
7.	"Downhill and Shadows"	Clempson, Hiseman, Tony Reeves	6:13
8.	"The Time Machine" (live)	Hiseman	8:11

== Personnel ==
- Chris Farlowe – lead vocals (tracks 1, 2, 4, 5, 7)
- Dick Heckstall-Smith – soprano and tenor saxophones; spoken word (track 1)
- Dave "Clem" Clempson – guitar; lead vocals (track 3)
- Dave Greenslade – organ, piano, vibes, backing vocals
- Mark Clarke – bass guitar (tracks 1, 5, 7)
- Jon Hiseman – drums, percussion

Additional personnel

- Barbara Thompson – flute, alto, soprano, tenor, and baritone saxophones, backing vocals (tracks 1–4)
- Louis Cennamo – bass guitar (tracks 2–4, 6)

== Charts ==
Chart (1970–71)	Peak position
UK Albums (Official Charts)	23
