= Colosseum LiveS – The Reunion Concerts =

LiveS The Reunion Concerts 1994

Live album by Colosseum
- Released: 1995; 26 August 2003 (Live Cologne 1994)
- Recorded: 24 June 1994 Freiburg; 28 October 1994 Cologne
- Genre: Jazz rock
- Length: 76:36; 49:46 (Live Cologne 1994)
- Labels: Intuition Records; Angel Air Records (Live Cologne 1994)
- Producer: Jon Hiseman

Colosseum chronology
Colosseum Live (1971)	LiveS The Reunion Concerts 1994 (1995)	Bread & Circuses (1997)

Professional ratings
Review scores
Source	Rating
Allmusic	3.5/5 stars
Maelstrom	8/10 stars

LiveS The Reunion Concerts 1994 is a live album by English progressive jazz-rock band Colosseum. It includes two tracks from their reunion concert at the Zelt-Musik-Festival in Freiburg, Germany and six tracks from the second reunion concert at the E-Werk in Cologne, Germany.

In 2003 Live Cologne 1994 was released, which contains the rest of the titles played in Reunion Concerts 1994 in Cologne.

In the same year a DVD with the complete Cologne concert was released under the title The Complete Reunion Concert Cologne 1994 (including a 90-minute documentary The Story of Colosseum).

== Track listing ==
=== LiveS The Reunion Concerts 1994 ===
1. "Those About to Die ..." (Greenslade, Heckstall-Smith, Hiseman, Reeves) — 5:06 *
2. "Elegy" (James Litherland) — 4:17
3. "The Valentyne Suite": (Colosseum) — 20:41
  1. "January's Search" (Greenslade, Hiseman) — 5:38
  2. "February's Valentyne" (Greenslade, Hiseman) — 5:16
  3. "The Grass Is Always Greener" (Heckstall-Smith, Hiseman) — 9:47
4. "Theme for an Imaginary Western" (Pete Brown, Jack Bruce) — 6:30
5. "The Machine Demands Another Sacrifice" (James Litherland) — 2:02
6. "Solo Colonia" (Hiseman) — 12:27
7. "Lost Angeles" (Greenslade, Heckstall-Smith, Farlowe) — 13:22
8. "Stormy Monday Blues" (T-Bone Walker) — 12:11 *

* live at Zelt-Musik-Festival, Freiburg, Germany, June 24, 1994.

=== Live Cologne 1994 ===
1. "Those About to Die" (Tony Reeves) — 5:22
2. "Skelington" (Clempson, Hiseman) — 12:24
3. "Tanglewood '63" (Mike Gibbs) — 10:54
4. "Rope Ladder To The Moon" (Bruce, Brown) — 9:41
5. "Stormy Monday Blues" (T-Bone Walker) — 5:27
6. "Walking In The Park" (Graham Bond) — 6:36

== Personnel ==
Colosseum

- Mark Clarke - bass guitar, vocals
- Dave "Clem" Clempson - guitars, vocals
- Chris Farlowe - vocals
- Dave Greenslade - keyboards, E-mu Proteus 2 & Roland U20, Hammond organ, vibraphone, vocals
- Dick Heckstall-Smith - saxophones
- Jon Hiseman - drums, percussion, cymbals
