= Valentyne Suite =

Studio album by Colosseum
- Released: November 1969
- Recorded: Spring and summer 1969
- Genres: Psychedelic rock; progressive rock; jazz rock
- Length: 35:00
- Label: Vertigo (UK)
- Producers: Tony Reeves, Gerry Bron

Colosseum chronology
Those Who Are About to Die Salute You (1969)	Valentyne Suite (1969)	The Grass Is Greener (1970)

Valentyne Suite is the second album released by the band Colosseum. It was Vertigo Records' first album release, and reached number 15 in the UK Albums Chart in 1969. The album peaked at number 18 in Australia in 1970.

Though the song "The Kettle" is officially listed as having been written by Dick Heckstall-Smith and Jon Hiseman, a credit which is confirmed by Hiseman's liner notes for the album, bassist and producer Tony Reeves later claimed that it was written by guitarist and vocalist James Litherland. The song's riff was later interpolated in three songs, notably "Ya Mama" by Fatboy Slim.

Colosseum – "Colosseum – Valentyne Suite, Theme 1 – January"
30 seconds (<10% of 6:20)

== Reception ==
Professional ratings
Review scores
Source	Rating
AllMusic	4/5 stars

AllMusic derided the first three tracks, referring to "The Kettle" and "Butty's Blues" as, "tarted-up 12-bar blues", and claiming that "Elegy" was beyond James Litherland's abilities as a vocalist. They were more approving of the rest of the album, and described Dave Greenslade's solo on "The Valentyne Suite" as, "something to offer a challenge to vintage Keith Emerson, but with swing." They were critical of Litherland and Reeves's playing on the song, however, and concluded, "In retrospect this might not quite be the classic it seemed at the time, but it remains listenable..."

== Track listing ==
Valentyne Suite was originally written with "Beware the Ides of March" as the final movement, but since "Beware the Ides of March" had already been released in the UK on Those Who Are About to Die Salute You, "The Grass is Always Greener" was substituted for the final movement in the UK release. Compact Disc issues of the suite follow the track listing of the UK release.

Side one
No.	Title	Writer(s)	Length
1.	"The Kettle"	Dick Heckstall-Smith, Jon Hiseman	4:25
2.	"Elegy"	James Litherland	3:10
3.	"Butty's Blues"	Litherland	6:44
4.	"The Machine Demands a Sacrifice"	Litherland, Heckstall-Smith, Pete Brown, Hiseman	3:52

Side two
No.	Title	Writer(s)	Length
5.	"The Valentyne Suite": "Theme One: January's Search" (6:20); "Theme Two: February's Valentyne" (3:37); "Theme Three: The Grass is Always Greener" (6:52)"	Dave Greenslade, Heckstall-Smith, Hiseman	16:49

== Personnel ==
=== Colosseum ===
- Dave Greenslade – Hammond organ, vibraphone, piano, backing vocal on "The Machine Demands a Sacrifice"
- Dick Heckstall-Smith – saxophones
- Jon Hiseman – drums, machine on "The Machine Demands a Sacrifice"
- James Litherland – guitars, lead vocals
- Tony Reeves – bass guitars

=== Guest musicians ===
- Neil Ardley – conductor on "Butty's Blues", string arrangement on "Elegy"
- Barbara Thompson – flute on "The Machine Demands a Sacrifice"

== Charts ==
Chart (1969–70)	Peak position
Australian Albums (Kent Music Report)	18
UK Albums (Official Charts)	15
