= Those Who Are About to Die Salute You =

Studio album by Colosseum
- Released: March 1969
- Recorded: November 1968
- Genres: Jazz fusion; progressive rock
- Length: 39:38
- Labels: Fontana (UK); Dunhill (U.S.)
- Producers: Tony Reeves, Gerry Bron

Colosseum chronology
Those Who Are About to Die Salute You (1969)	Valentyne Suite (1969)

Those Who Are About to Die Salute You is the debut album by Colosseum, released in 1969 by Fontana. It is one of the pioneering albums of jazz fusion. The title is a translation of the Latin phrase morituri te salutant that according to popular belief (but not academic agreement), gladiators addressed to the emperor before the beginning of a gladiatorial match.

The album reached number 15 in the UK Albums Chart.

== Background ==
"Debut" is the first song Colosseum ever played as a group. Tony Reeves later recalled that "Debut" "was actually a phrase that I remembered Mick Taylor playing with John Mayall, and I changed it a bit into a bass line. [Sings the part.] And then the band all joined in – this is what happens during rehearsals – so technically you should have everybody's name in the writing credit, including, I guess, Mick Taylor's!"

"Mandarin" started from a series of sketches by Dave Greenslade that were based on a Japanese soft scale. Tony Reeves compiled the sketches into the main theme and arranged the song.

"Beware the Ides of March" borrows a theme of the fugue of "Toccata and Fugue in D minor" by Johann Sebastian Bach (Bach BWV 565).

Colosseum also recorded "I Can't Live Without You", which appears on the 2004 re-release as a bonus track.

== Reception ==
Allmusic's retrospective review is laudatory, saying the album "is a powerful one, unleashing each member's instrumental prowess at one point while consolidating each talent to form an explosive outpouring of progressive jazz/rock the next." They highly praised the variety and uniqueness of each song, the playing of the musicians, and the group's ability to create a blend of jazz, rock, and classical elements that was unconventional yet accessible. They concluded "the album never strays from its intensity or its creativity", and added that Valentyne Suite is similar and just as outstanding, even though Allmusic's official review of that album is largely negative.

It was voted number 23 in the All-Time 50 Long Forgotten Gems from Colin Larkin's All Time Top 1000 Albums.

== Track listing ==
=== UK release ===
side one
No.	Title	Writer(s)	Length
1.	"Walking in the Park"	Graham Bond	3:51
2.	"Plenty Hard Luck"	Dave Greenslade, Dick Heckstall-Smith, Jon Hiseman, James Litherland, Tony Reeves	4:23
3.	"Mandarin"	Reeves, Greenslade	4:27
4.	"Debut"	Greenslade, Heckstall-Smith, Hiseman, Reeves	6:20

side two
No.	Title	Writer(s)	Length
5.	"Beware the Ides of March"	Greenslade, Heckstall-Smith, Hiseman, Reeves	5:34
6.	"The Road She Walked Before"	Heckstall-Smith	2:39
7.	"Backwater Blues"	Bessie Smith	7:35
8.	"Those About to Die"	Greenslade, Heckstall-Smith, Hiseman, Reeves	4:49

=== US release ===
In the United States, the album was released in July 1969 on the Dunhill label with a different tracklist and a different cover.

side one
No.	Title	Writer(s)	Length
1.	"The Kettle"	Heckstall-Smith, Hiseman	4:15
2.	"Plenty Hard Luck"	Greenslade, Heckstall-Smith, Hiseman, Litherland, Reeves	4:20
3.	"Debut"	Greenslade, Heckstall-Smith, Hiseman, Reeves	6:13
4.	"Those About to Die"	Greenslade, Heckstall-Smith, Hiseman, Reeves	4:47

side two
No.	Title	Writer(s)	Length
5.	"Valentyne Suite": "Theme One - January's Search"; "Theme Two - February's Valentyne"; "Theme Three - Beware the Ides Of March"	Heckstall-Smith, Hiseman, Greenslade	15:18
6.	"Walking in the Park"	Bond	3:49

=== 2004 remastered release ===
A remastered version was released in 2004 on Sanctuary Records. Tracks 1–8 were the same as the original UK album.

No.	Title	Writer(s)	Length
9.	"I Can't Live Without You"	Litherland	4:16
10.	"A Whiter Spade Than Mayall"		4:51
11.	"Walking In The Park"	Bond	3:44
12.	"Beware The Ides Of March"	Greenslade, Heckstall-Smith, Hiseman, Reeves	4:09
13.	"Plenty Hard Luck"	Greenslade, Heckstall-Smith, Hiseman, Litherland, Reeves	2:42
14.	"Walking In The Park"	Bond	3:16

Track 9: Studio outtake.

Track 10: Recorded 12-Dec-1968, broadcast 17-Jan-1969 – BBC "Top Gear". At that point, the name of the band was Jon Hiseman's Colosseum.

Tracks 11 to 13: Recorded 24-Feb-1969, broadcast 16-Mar-1969 – BBC "Symonds On Sunday".

Track 14: With Brian Matthews voiceover, BBC Top Of The Pops".

== Personnel ==
Colosseum

- Dave Greenslade – Hammond organ, vibraphone, piano, backing vocals on "The Road She Walked Before"
- Dick Heckstall-Smith – tenor and soprano saxophone
- James Litherland – guitar, lead vocals
- Tony Reeves – bass guitar
- Jon Hiseman – drums

with:

- Jim Roche – guitar on "Backwater Blues"
- Henry Lowther – trumpet on "Walking in the Park"

Technical

- Adrian Kerridge – engineer
- Linda Glover – sleeve design
- Richard Sterling – front cover photography

== Charts ==
Chart (1969)	Peak position
UK Albums (Official Charts)	15
