= Tomorrow's Blues =

Studio album by Colosseum
- Released: 2003
- Studio: Temple Music Studio, Sutton, Surrey
- Genre: Pop rock
- Length: 53:17
- Label: Castle/Sanctuary
- Producer: Jon Hiseman, Dave Greenslade, Dave Clempson

Colosseum chronology
Bread and Circuses (1997)	Tomorrow's Blues (2003)	An Introduction To...Colosseum (2004)

Tomorrow's Blues is an album by the band Colosseum that was released in 2003.

== Track listing ==
1. "Tomorrow's Blues" (Clempson, Bell) – 6:41
2. "Come Right Back" (Greenslade) – 4:32
3. "In the Heat of the Night" (Quincy Jones, Alan Bergman, Marilyn Bergman) – 5:37
4. "Hard Times Rising" (Clempson, Brown) – 6:41
5. "Arena in the Sun" (Greenslade) – 3:25
6. "Thief in the Night" (Clempson, Brown) – 5:47
7. "Take the Dark Times With the Sun" (Greenslade) – 5:12
8. "The Net Man" (Greenslade) – 5:39
9. "Leisure Complex Blues" (Heckstall-Smith, Brown) – 5:12
10. "No Demons" (Greenslade) – 4:31

== Personnel ==
Colosseum

- Chris Farlowe - lead vocals (all but 9)
- Dick Heckstall-Smith - saxophones
- Dave "Clem" Clempson - guitar, backing vocals
- Dave Greenslade - synthesizer, piano, Hammond organ
- Mark Clarke - bass, backing and lead (9) vocals
- Jon Hiseman - drums, cymbals
