= Bread and Circuses (Colosseum album) =

Bread & Circuses

Studio album by Colosseum
- Released: 1997
- Recorded: April 1996–July 1997
- Genre: Jazz rock
- Length: 50:04
- Producer: Steve Chase, Jon Hiseman, Dave Clempson, Dave Greenslade

Colosseum chronology
Colosseum LiveS - The Reunion Concerts (1994)	Bread & Circuses (1997)	Tomorrow's Blues (2003)

Bread & Circuses is a 1997 album by Colosseum.

== Track listing ==
1. "Watching Your Every Move" (Dick Heckstall-Smith, Clem Clempson, Jon Hiseman) – 4:03
2. "Bread & Circuses" (Clempson, Hiseman)– 3:37
3. "Wherever I Go" (Dave Greenslade) – 4:15
4. "High Time" (Clempson, Garry Bell) – 4:06
5. "Big Deal" (Heckstall-Smith, Pete Brown) – 5:11
6. "The Playground" (Greenslade) – 5:07
7. "No Pleasin'" (Greenslade) – 5:02
8. "I Could Tell You Tales" (Greenslade, Heckstall-Smith, Brown) – 5:04
9. "Storms Behind the Breeze" (Greenslade) – 4:42
10. "The One That Got Away" (Greenslade, Mark Clarke) (Note: Per BMI records (see BMI Work #18267808). The album's liner notes provide no songwriting credit for this track.) – 4:15
11. "The Other Side of the Sky" (Greenslade) – 4:42

== Personnel ==
Colosseum

- Chris Farlowe - lead vocals (all but 6)
- Dick Heckstall-Smith - saxophones
- Dave "Clem" Clempson - guitars, backing vocals
- Dave Greenslade - Hammond organ, synthesizers, piano
- Mark Clarke - bass, backing and lead (6) vocals
- Jon Hiseman - drums

Additional personnel

- Chris "Snake" Davis - trumpet
- Dave O'Higgins - saxophone
- Barbara Thompson - brass arrangement (7)

== See also ==
- Bread and Circuses (disambiguation)
