= The Sound of '65 =

Studio album by The Graham Bond Organization
- Released: February 26, 1965
- Recorded: December 16, 19, 1964, January 4, 5 and February 4, 1965
- Studios: Olympic Studios, Carlton St, West End of London
- Genres: Rhythm and blues, jazz
- Length: 34:17
- Label: Columbia (The Gramophone Co. Ltd. label)
- Producer: Robert Stigwood

The Graham Bond Organization chronology
The Sound of '65 (1965)	There's a Bond Between Us (1965)

Professional ratings
Review scores
Source	Rating
Allmusic	4.5/5 stars

The Sound of 65 is the debut album by rhythm and blues/jazz group The Graham Bond Organisation, featuring its best-known line-up of Graham Bond (vocals, alto saxophone, Hammond B-3 organ and Mellotron), Jack Bruce (vocals, acoustic and electric basses, harmonica), Dick Heckstall-Smith (tenor and soprano saxophone) and Ginger Baker (drums).

Melody Maker's Chris Welch has suggested The Sound of '65 "may have been the greatest album of the Sixties" and "one of the most exciting and influential of its time" given the respect paid by luminaries like Steve Winwood and Bill Bruford. This album and the group's second and last, There's a Bond Between Us are now considered "essential listening for anyone who is seriously interested in either British blues, The Rolling Stones' early sound, or the history of popular music, in England or America, during the late '50s and early '60s" and is also known among fans of Cream, which Bond's rhythm section joined in the next year.

In his book A New Day Yesterday: UK Progressive Rock & the 70s (2020), Mike Barnes notes that The Sound of '65 was the first album to feature the Mellotron, a tape loop-based keyboard instrument which later became popular in progressive rock. Barnes describes Bond as one of the most influential artists of the 1960s, partly for his band's "freshly minted, jazz-inflected take on R&B including some classical influences."

The ensemble's cover of "Wade in the Water", released as a single, begins with an interpolation of Johann Sebastian Bach's Toccata and Fugue in D minor, BWV 565. It was one of the first singles purchased by keyboardist Keith Emerson, who described the intro as "cool", and similarly interpolated Toccata and Fugue in D Minor during the Nice's "Rondo" (from The Thoughts of Emerlist Davjack, 1967).

== Track listing ==
Side A

1. "Hoochie Coochie Man" (Willie Dixon) – 3:11
2. "Baby Make Love to Me" (Janet Godfrey, John Group) – 1:49
3. "Neighbour, Neighbour" (Alton Joseph Valier) – 2:37
4. "Early in the Morning" (Traditional, arranged by Group) – 1:47
5. "Spanish Blues" (Graham Bond) – 3:03
6. "Oh Baby" (Bond) – 2:39
7. "Little Girl" (Bond) – 2:11

Side B

1. "I Want You" (Bond) – 1:43
2. "Wade in the Water" (Traditional, arranged by Group and Paul Getty) – 2:39
3. "Got My Mojo Working" (McKinley Morganfield) – 3:08
4. "Train Time" (Group) – 2:21
5. "Baby Be Good to Me" (Godfrey, Group) – 2:21
6. "Half a Man" (Bond) – 2:02
7. "Tammy" (Jay Livingston, Ray Evans) – 2:46

== Personnel ==
- Graham Bond – Hammond organ, vocals, Mellotron, alto saxophone
- Dick Heckstall-Smith – tenor saxophone
- Jack Bruce – electric and acoustic basses, vocals, harmonica
- Ginger Baker – drums
