= Cactus Choir =

Studio album by Dave Greenslade
- Released: 1976
- Genre: Progressive rock
- Length: 41:36
- Label: Warner Bros. (UK)
- Producer: Gregg Jackman, Dave Greenslade, Rupert Hine

Dave Greenslade chronology
Cactus Choir (1976)	The Pentateuch of the Cosmogony (1979)

Professional ratings
Review scores
Source	Rating
Allmusic	4/5 stars

Cactus Choir is the first solo album by British keyboardist Dave Greenslade, released in 1976 soon after the disbandment of his own eponymous band, Greenslade. His Greenslade bandmate Tony Reeves also plays on half of the album's tracks. The artwork for the cover is by Roger Dean.

== Track listing ==
All music written by Dave Greenslade. Lyrics written by Jon Hiseman (2) and Martin Hall (4, 6b).

Side one

1. "Pedro's Party" - 2:38
2. "Gettysburg" - 3:58
3. "Swings and Roundabouts" - 4:19
4. "Time Takes My Time" - 6:00
5. "Forever and Ever" - 4:06

Side two

6. "Cactus Choir" - 6:15

a)"The Rider" - 2:52
b)"Greeley and the Rest" - 2:01
c)"March at Sunset" - 1:22

7. "Country Dance" - 5:36
8. "Finale" - 8:37

2014 reissue bonus track

9. "Gangsters" - 2:56

== Personnel ==
- Dave Greenslade — keyboards, lead vocal (4), vibraphone (5, 6, 8), handclaps (1), percussion (3), co-producer
- Tony Reeves — bass guitar (1, 2, 6, 8)
- Simon Phillips — drums, percussion (1, 3)
- Steve Gould — lead and backing vocals (2, 6)
- Dave Markee — bass guitar (3, 4), percussion (3)
- John G. Perry — bass guitar (7)
- Mick Grabham — guitar (4)
- Lissa Gray — backing vocal (4)
- Bill Jackman — bass flute (8), bass clarinet (8)
- Gregg Jackman — co-producer, engineer, handclaps (1)
- Rupert Hine — co-producer, handclaps (1)
- Chris Tsangarides, Martin Moss - assistant engineers
- Simon Jeffes — orchestra arranger
- Martin Ford — orchestra conductor
