= Graham Bond =

English musician (1937–1974)

- Also known as: Grahame Bond
- Born: Graham John Clifton Bond; 28 October 1937; Romford, England
- Died: 8 May 1974 (aged 36) Finsbury Park station, London, England
- Genres: Blues; blues rock; occult rock; jazz rock; R&B
- Instruments: Keyboards, saxophone, vocals
- Years active: 1960s–1974
- Label: Decca
- Website: grahambond.org

Graham John Clifton Bond (28 October 1937 – 8 May 1974) was an English rock/blues musician and vocalist, considered a founding father of the English rhythm and blues boom of the 1960s.

Bond was an innovator, described as "an important, under-appreciated figure of early British R&B", along with Cyril Davies and Alexis Korner. Jack Bruce, John McLaughlin and Ginger Baker first achieved prominence in his group, the Graham Bond Organisation. Bond was voted Britain's New Jazz Star in 1961. He was an early user of the Hammond organ/Leslie speaker combination in British rhythm and blues – he "split" the Hammond for portability – and was the first rock artist to record using a Mellotron. As such he was a major influence upon later rock keyboardists: Deep Purple's Jon Lord said: "He taught me, hands on, most of what I know about the Hammond organ."

== Biography ==
Bond was born in Romford, Essex, England. Adopted from a Dr Barnardo's home, he was educated at the Royal Liberty School in Gidea Park, East London, where he learned music. His first jazz gig was in 1960 with the Goudie Charles Quintet, staying for a year.

He first gained national attention as a jazz saxophonist as a member of the Don Rendell Quintet, then briefly joined Alexis Korner's Blues Incorporated before forming the Graham Bond Quartet, a jazz group, with musicians he met in the Korner group, Ginger Baker on drums and Jack Bruce on double bass, together with John McLaughlin on guitar and himself on saxophone. Tracks from this 1962-63 GBQ lineup can be heard on the album Solid Bond.

Deciding to switch to blues, as it was gaining popularity in England, and keeping the rhythm section of Bruce and Baker from the jazz quartet while adding Dick Heckstall-Smith on saxophones, Bond now instead played the Hammond organ and sang. This lineup became The Graham Bond Organisation (GBO), and released their first album, The Sound of '65, in February of that year. Their second album There's A Bond Between Us (October 1965), is considered the first recording of rock music that uses a Mellotron.

The group was plagued by substance abuse problems, particularly Bond's, as well as the relentless bickering between Baker and Bruce. Due to his declining situation, Bond entrusted running of the band to Baker, who then used that power to fire Bruce, which saw the band continue, albeit with declining success as a trio. Baker would leave soon after to start his own band, with the first invite going to Eric Clapton, at the time guitarist with the UK's premier blues band, John Mayall & the Bluesbreakers. Clapton accepted, with the caveat that Jack Bruce be added as vocalist and bassist. Meanwhile, the Organisation carried on as a trio with Jon Hiseman on drums, but Bond's mental and physical health continued to deteriorate, until the band eventually dissolved in 1967. The group's lack of commercial success is generally put down to Bond being "unable to find a commercially successful niche. Some jazz fans regarded Bond's band as too noisy and rock-based, while the pop audience found his music complicated and too jazzy". Heckstall-Smith and Hiseman went on to form Colosseum, recording Bond's song "Walkin' in the Park" for their first album. According to John Steel, in that same period over the 1960s, Bond gave the rock band The Animals their name before they hit fame after seeing them perform at the Club a'Gogo in Newcastle.

After the break-up of the Organisation, Bond continued to exhibit mental disorders, with manic episodes and periods of intense depression, exacerbated by heavy drug use. Moving to America, he recorded two albums and performed session work for Harvey Mandel and Dr. John, among others, but he returned to England in 1969. He then formed the Graham Bond Initiation with his new wife Diane Stewart, who shared his interest in magick, and in 1970 the occult rock group Magick, which recorded Holy Magick and We Put Our Magick on You. He was also re-united with old band members while playing saxophone in Ginger Baker's Air Force and spending a short time in the Jack Bruce Band. Solid Bond, a double-album compiling live tracks recorded in 1963 by the Graham Bond Quartet (Bond, McLaughlin, Bruce and Baker) and a studio session from 1966 by the Graham Bond Organisation (Bond, Heckstall-Smith and Hiseman) was released that same year.

In 1972, Bond teamed up with Pete Brown to record Two Heads are Better Than One. He also recorded an album with the John Dummer Band in 1973, although this was not released until 2008. After the near-simultaneous collapse of his band and his marriage, Bond then formed Magus with British folk-singer Carolanne Pegg and bassist Pete Macbeth, which disbanded around Christmas 1973 without recording. During that same period, Bond discovered American singer-songwriter-guitarist Mick Lee, and they played together live but did not record. Plans to include Chris Wood of Traffic never materialized due to Bond's death.

Bond's financial affairs were in chaos, and the years of lack of commercial success and the recent demise of Magus had badly hurt his pride. Throughout his career he had been hampered by severe bouts of drug addiction, and he spent January 1973 in hospital after a nervous breakdown. According to Harry Shapiro, in his biography The Mighty Shadow, Bond was considered as a possible replacement for Patrick Moraz in Refugee. On 8 May 1974, Bond was run over by a train at Finsbury Park station and died at the age of 36. Most sources list the death as a suicide. Friends agree that he was off drugs, although becoming increasingly obsessed with the occult (he believed he was Aleister Crowley's son).

In 2015, Bond's work was the focus of a two-hour special on the Dr Boogie radio show.

== Discography ==
=== as The Graham Bond Organisation ===
- The Sound of '65 (1965)
- There's a Bond Between Us (1965)
- Rock Generation Vols. 3 & 4 (1972, live recordings at Klooks Kleek 1964)

=== Other Bond-led recordings ===
- Solid Bond 1963-1966 (Warner Bros 1970)
- Wade In The Water (Classics, Origins & Oddities) 1963-1966 (Repertoire Records 4-CD set 2012)
- Live At The BBC And Other Stories 1962-1972 (Repertoire Records 4-CD set 2015)
- Love Is the Law (Pulsar, 1969, as Grahame Bond)
- Mighty Grahame Bond (Pulsar, 1969, as Grahame Bond)
- Holy Magick (Vertigo, December 1970)
- We Put Our Magick on You (Vertigo, October 1971)
- Two Heads Are Better Than One (with Pete Brown, 1972)

=== In other groups ===
- Roarin' (with Don Rendell New Jazz Quartet, Jazzland, October 1961)

== Bibliography ==
- Bob Brunning (1986), Blues: The British Connection, London: Helter Skelter, 2002, ISBN 1-900924-41-2
- Bob Brunning, The Fleetwood Mac Story: Rumours and Lies Omnibus Press, 2004, foreword of B. B. King
- Dick Heckstall-Smith (2004), The Safest Place in the World: A personal history of British Rhythm and blues, Clear Books, ISBN 0-7043-2696-5 – First Edition: Blowing The Blues – Fifty Years Playing The British Blues
- Christopher Hjort, Strange brew: Eric Clapton and the British blues boom, 1965-1970, foreword by John Mayall, Jawbone (2007), ISBN 1-906002002
- Harry Shapiro, Alexis Korner: The Biography, Bloomsbury Publishing PLC, London 1997, Discography by Mark Troster
- Harry Shapiro, Graham Bond: The Mighty Shadow, Square One (UK), 1992
- Martyn Hanson: Playing the Band – the musical life of Jon Hiseman. Temple Music, 2010. ISBN 9780956686305
