= Big Chief (disambiguation) =

"Big Chief" is a song written by Earl King.

Big Chief may also refer to:

== Music ==
- Big Chief (American band), American funk rock band
- Big Chief (British band), British jazz band
- Big Chief Ellis, American blues pianist
- Big Chief Russell Moore, American jazz trombonist
- Big Chief Henry's Indian String Band, American string band
- Big Chief!, a 1961 album by Junior Mance
- Big Chief (Sunny Murray album), 1969

== Other ==
- Big Chief Bonner, American college football player
- Big Chief Keen-eyed-Mole, a fictional character from The Adventures of Tintin
- Big Chief tablet, a paper notebook brand
- Big Chief Restaurant in Wildwood, Missouri, US
- Big Chief, a nickname for William Howard Taft, the 27th president of United States
