= Anthology (Colosseum album) =

Compilation album by Colosseum
- Released: 2000
- Genre: Rock, jazz
- Length: 124:10

Anthology is a 2000 compilation album by Colosseum.

== Track listing ==
1. "Valentyne Suite" – 16:55
2. "Beware the Ides of March" – 5:36
3. "Debut" – 6:20
4. "I Can't Live Without You" – 4:15
5. "Bolero" – 5:29
6. "Time Lament" – 6:12
7. "Theme from an Imaginary Western" – 4:06
8. "The Time Machine" – 8:09
9. "Rope Ladder to the Moon" – 9:44 (live)
10. "Three Score and Ten, Amen" – 5:37
11. "Downhill and Shadows" – 6:13
12. "Walking in the Park" – 3:55
13. "Backwater Blues" – 7:37
14. "The Kettle" – 4:27
15. "Elegy" – 3:12
16. "Butty's Blues" – 6:45
17. "The Machine Demands a Sacrifice" – 3:54
18. "Lost Angeles" – 15:44
