= Dave Gelly =

British jazz critic (born 1938)

David Gelly
- Born: 28 January 1938 (age 88); Bexleyheath, Kent, England
- Education: St Dunstan's College; Downing College, Cambridge
- Occupations: Jazz critic, musician, broadcaster
- Instruments: Saxophone
- Labels: Mainstem Records, Spotlight Records
- Formerly of: New Jazz Orchestra

David "Dave" Gelly MBE (born 28 January 1938) is a British jazz critic and musician. A long-standing contributor to newspaper The Observer, he was honoured at the 1999 British Jazz Awards as "Jazz Writer of the Year". Gelly is a jazz saxophonist and broadcaster, presenting a number of shows for BBC Radio 2 including Night Owls for much of the 1980s.

== Biography ==
=== Early life ===
Gelly was born in Bexleyheath, Kent, on 28 January 1938, and grew up in south London. He attended St Dunstan's College, and won a scholarship to read English under F. R. Leavis at Downing College, Cambridge.

=== Career ===
Gelly played with Art Themen, George Walden and Lionel Grigson in the Cambridge University band, and from the mid-1960s co-led his own quartets and quintets with Frank Ricotti, with Jeff Scott, and with Barbara Thompson.

Gelly was a member of the New Jazz Orchestra, directed by Neil Ardley, which also featured Ian Carr, Jon Hiseman, Barbara Thompson, Mike Gibbs, Don Rendell, and Trevor Tomkins.

Gelly was also a teacher during the 1960s and 1970s at William Penn School, Dulwich.

== Discography ==
As leader/co-leader

- 2001: Strike A Light (Mainstem Records)

As sideman

- 1968: Le Dejeuner sur L'Herbe – The New Jazz Orchestra
- 1971: A Symphony of Amaranths – Neil Ardley
- 1973: Mike Taylor Remembered (with Jon Hiseman, Barbara Thompson, Ian Carr, Henry Lowther, Norma Winstone, Ron Mathewson, Stan Sulzmann, Alan Branscombe and Chris Pyne, among others)
- 2003: John Williams's Tenorama (Spotlite Records)

== Publications ==
- The Giants of Jazz (Schirmer Books, 1986) with Miles Kington
- Masters of Jazz Saxophone: The Story of the Players and Their Music (2000)
- Stan Getz: Nobody Else But Me (2002) ISBN 0-87930-729-3
- Being Prez: The Life and Music of Lester Young (Equinox, 2007)
- An Unholy Row (Equinox, 2014)
