= Colosseum (band) =

English jazz-rock band

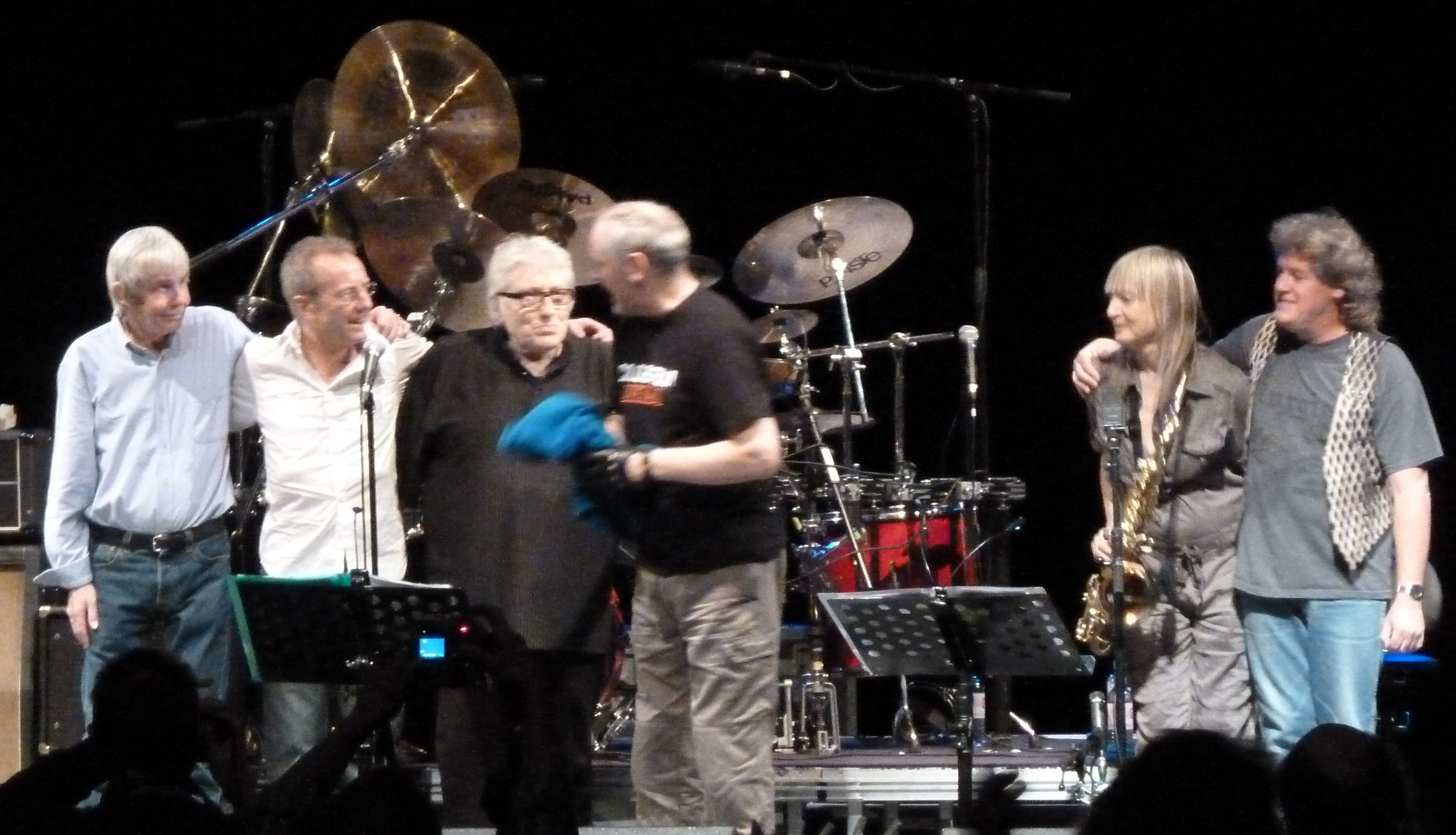
- Colosseum in 2010

Background information
- Origin: England
- Genres: Jazz rock; progressive rock
- Years active: 1968–1971; 1994–2015; 2020–present
- Labels: Fontana; Vertigo; Dunhill
- Spinoffs: Colosseum II; Tempest; Greenslade
- Members: Dave "Clem" Clempson; Mark Clarke; Chris Farlowe; Kim Nishikawara; Malcolm Mortimore; Nick Steed
- Past members: Dave Greenslade; Dick Heckstall-Smith; Jon Hiseman; James Litherland; Tony Reeves; Jim Roche; Louis Cennamo; Barbara Thompson; Adrian Askew

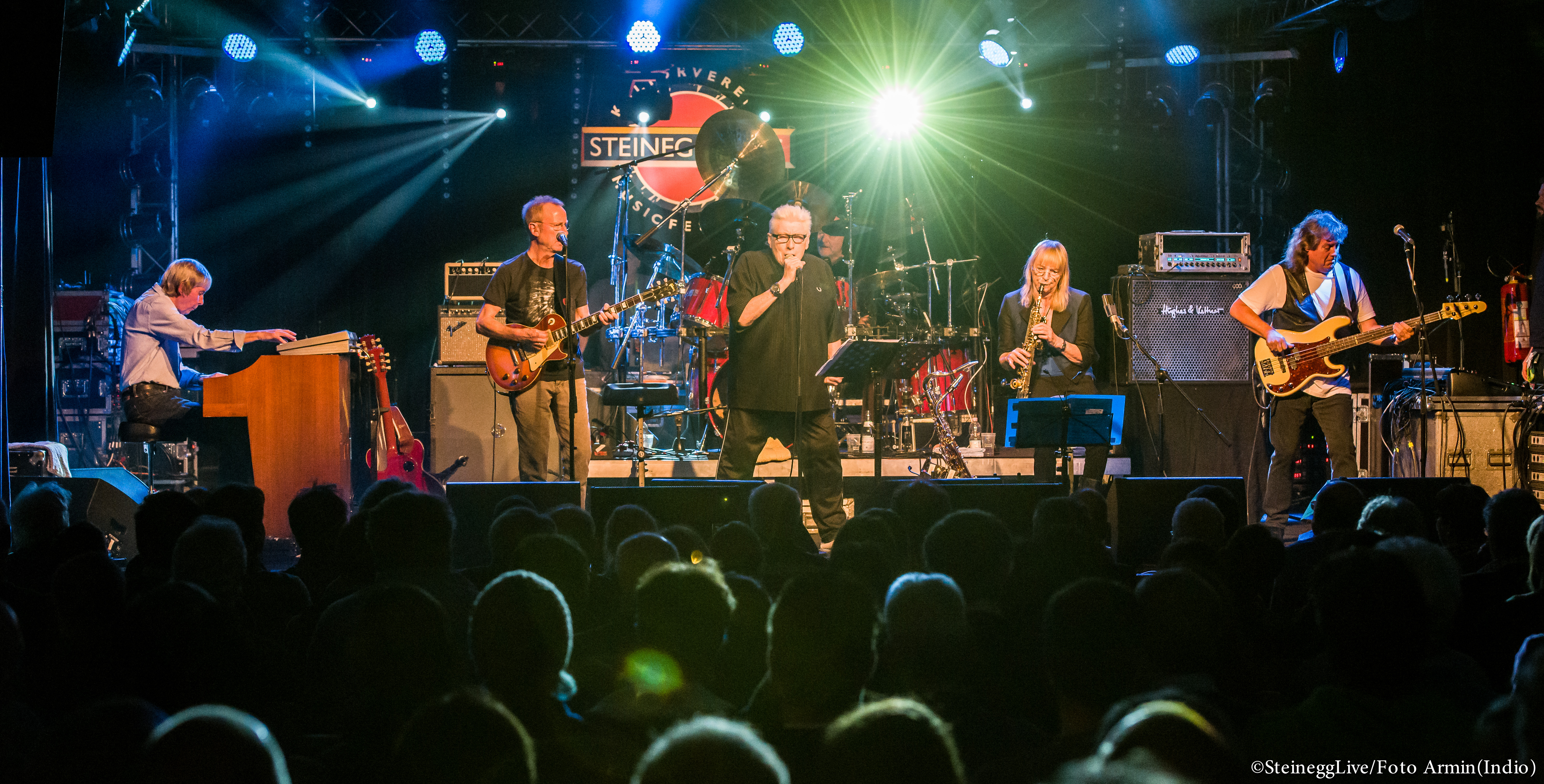
Colosseum live at Steinegg Live Festival 2014.

Colosseum are an English jazz rock band, mixing blues, rock and jazz-based improvisation. Colin Larkin wrote that "the commercial acceptance of jazz rock in the UK" was mainly due to the band. Between 1975 and 1978 a separate band Colosseum II existed playing progressive rock, founded by Colosseum band leader Jon Hiseman.

== History ==
=== Original tenure; 1968–1971 ===
Colosseum, one of the first bands to fuse jazz, rock and blues, were formed in early 1968 by drummer Jon Hiseman and tenor sax player Dick Heckstall-Smith, who had previously worked together in the New Jazz Orchestra and in The Graham Bond Organisation, where Hiseman had replaced Ginger Baker in 1966. They met up again early in 1968 when they both played in John Mayall's Bluesbreakers, during which time they played on the Bare Wires album. Childhood friend Dave Greenslade was quickly recruited on organ, as was bass player Tony Reeves who had also known both Hiseman and Greenslade since being teenage musicians in South East London. The band's line-up was completed, after lengthy auditions, by Jim Roche on guitar and James Litherland (guitar and vocals), although Roche only recorded one track before departing.

Their first album, Those Who Are About to Die Salute You, which opened with the Bond composition "Walkin' in the Park", was released by Philips' Fontana label in early 1969. In March the same year they were invited to take part in Supershow, a two-day filmed jam session, along with Modern Jazz Quartet, Led Zeppelin, Jack Bruce, Roland Kirk Quartet, Eric Clapton, Stephen Stills, and Juicy Lucy.

Colosseum's second album, later in 1969, was Valentyne Suite, notable as the first release on Philips' newly launched Vertigo label, established to sign and develop artists that did not fit the main Philips brand, and the first label to sign heavy metal pioneers Black Sabbath.

For the third album, The Grass Is Greener, released only in the United States in 1970, Dave "Clem" Clempson replaced James Litherland. Louis Cennamo then briefly replaced Tony Reeves on bass, but was himself replaced by Mark Clarke within a month. Hiseman then recruited vocalist Chris Farlowe to allow Clempson to concentrate on guitar. This line-up had already partly recorded the 1970 album Daughter of Time.

In March 1971, the band recorded concerts at the Big Apple Club in Brighton and at Manchester University. Hiseman was impressed with the atmosphere at the Manchester show, and the band returned five days later for a free concert that was also recorded. The recordings were released as a live double album Colosseum Live in 1971. In October 1971 the original band broke up.

=== Interim, 1971–1994 ===
After the band split, Jon Hiseman formed Tempest with bassist Mark Clarke; Dave Greenslade formed Greenslade together with Tony Reeves; Chris Farlowe joined Atomic Rooster and Dick Heckstall-Smith embarked on a solo career. Clem Clempson joined the hit group Humble Pie.

Hiseman formed another group called Colosseum II in 1975, with a stronger orientation towards jazz-fusion rock. The band featured guitarist Gary Moore and Don Airey on keyboards. They released three albums before disbanding in 1978.

=== Reunion, 1994–2015 ===
Colosseum reunited on 24 June 1994 at the Freiburg Zelt Musik Festival, with the same line-up as when they split in 1971. On 28 October they played a concert in Cologne at E-Werk which was recorded for a TV Special. Recordings from this show were released in 1995 as a CD and a video, and re-released in 2004 as a DVD. The rejuvenated band then played a lengthy tour of mainly German concerts. A second tour followed in 1997 to promote their new studio album "Bread and Circuses". They also appeared at major festivals in 1998, 1999 and 2000.

In 2003 they toured on the back of the "Tomorrow's Blues" CD, followed also by gigs in England in 2004. Hiseman's wife, saxophonist Barbara Thompson, joined the band on various occasions. When Dick Heckstall-Smith died in December 2004 she became a permanent member of the band.

In 2005 there were three memorial concerts for Dick Heckstall-Smith, one in Hamburg and two in England.

On 24 September 2005 they performed in Moscow, followed by more concerts in 2006.

In 2007 they made their first appearance in Japan and returned to play more dates in Germany.

Further tours of Europe were made in 2010.

In October 2010, Jon Hiseman's biography, Playing the Band - The Musical Life of Jon Hiseman, was published. In November 2012, a Kindle version (with minor re-edits) of Playing the Band was published.

Colosseum played their "Summer 2011" tour of 22 gigs in Germany, Italy, Austria, Finland and Poland. The tour started in June and ended on 20 August in Rostock, Germany, at the Bad Doberan "Zappanale" festival. According to the interview of the bandleader Jon Hiseman, Bad Doberan was the last concert of the band. Their second 'last' concert was in Poland, Slupsk, at the "Legends of Rock" festival on 13 August 2011 and the third 'last' concert in Finland, Äänekoski, at the "Keitelejazz" festival on the 23 July 2011. These announcements were based on Barbara's deterioration of health due to Parkinson's disease, which prevented her from playing. However, with the advent of new medication, her ability to play was renewed; so those announcements proved to have been premature, and the band continued to record and play until 2015.

More studio releases followed, as expanded editions of Valentyne Suite and Colosseum Live, and several compilation sets of earlier work. From 2011 to 2014, Colosseum gradually recorded their album, titled Time on our Side, which was eventually released late in 2014 to coincide with their final flurry of dates in Germany and the UK. These included 24 concerts during 2014 in Central Europe, starting 23 October at the Steinegg Festival, Collepietra, Italy, followed by concerts in February 2015 before ending on the 28th of that month at the Shepherd's Bush Empire, London. At all these concerts, Jon Hiseman informed from the stage that this tour would be Colosseum's last.

After 23 years the band played what Hiseman referred to as 'the last hurrah!' before an audience at the Shepherd's Bush Empire, London, on 28 February 2015. Special guest was Ana Gracey, the daughter of Jon Hiseman and Barbara Thompson. Together with Chris Farlowe she sang her own composition "Blues to Music", which was also included on the final Colosseum CD.

=== Second reunion, 2020–present ===
Colosseum reunited again after the death of Jon Hiseman to play selected shows in 2020. The line-up is Chris Farlowe, Clem Clempson and Mark Clarke, joined by Kim Nishikawara (sax), Adrian Askew (keys, organ) and Malcolm Mortimore (drums). In September 2020, it was reported that the keyboard position would be filled by Nick Steed. This line-up started touring on 29 August in Hamburg at Landhaus Walter to be continued in UK. On 15 April 2022 they released their new studio album, Restoration.

== Members ==
=== Current members ===
Image	Name	Years active	Instruments	Release contributions
	Dave "Clem" Clempson	1969–1971; 1994–2015; 2020–present	guitar; vocals; keyboards	all releases from The Grass Is Greener (1970) onwards, except Live At The Boston Tea Party, August 1969 – (2020) and Live At The Montreux Jazz Festival 1969 – (2020)
	Mark Clarke	1970–1971; 1994–2015; 2020–present	bass; vocals	all releases from Daughter of Time (1970) onwards, except Live At The Boston Tea Party, August 1969 (2020), Live At The Montreux Jazz Festival 1969 – (2020), Live At Ruisrock, Turku, Finland, 1970 – (2020)
	Chris Farlowe	1970–1971; 1994–2015; 2020–present	vocals	all releases from Daughter of Time (1970) onwards, except Live At The Boston Tea Party, August 1969 (2020), Live At The Montreux Jazz Festival 1969 – (2020), Live At Ruisrock, Turku, Finland, 1970 – (2020)
	Kim Nishikawara	2020–present	saxophones	all releases from Restoration (2022) onwards
	Malcolm Mortimore	2020–present	drums	all releases from Restoration (2022) onwards
	Nick Steed	2020–present	organ; synthesizers; piano	all releases from Restoration (2022) onwards

=== Former members ===
Image	Name	Years active	Instruments	Release contributions
	Dave Greenslade	1968–1971; 1994–2015 (died 2026)	organ; piano; synthesizer; vibraphone; keyboards; backing vocals	all releases from Those Who Are About to Die Salute You (1969) to Transmissions, Live At The BBC (2020)
	Jon Hiseman	1968–1971; 1994–2015 (died 2018)	drums	all releases from Those Who Are About to Die Salute You (1969) to Transmissions, Live At The BBC (2020)
	Dick Heckstall-Smith	1968–1971; 1994–2004 (until his death)	saxophone; flute	all releases from Those Who Are About to Die Salute You (1969) to The Complete Reunion Concert – (2003); Live At The Boston Tea Party, August 1969 (2020); Live At The Montreux Jazz Festival 1969 (2020); Live At Ruisrock, Turku, Finland, 1970 (2020); Live At Piper Club, Rome, Italy 1971 (2020); Live '71, Canterbury, Brighton & Manchester (2020); Transmissions, Live At The BBC (2020)
	James Litherland	1968–1969	guitar; vocals	Those Who Are About to Die Salute You (1969); Valentyne Suite (1969); The Grass Is Greener (1970); The Collectors Colosseum (1971); Epitaph (1986); Milestones (1989); Night Riding (1990); Daughter of Time (1991); The Time Machine(1991); The Ides of March (1995); Anthology (2000); Best - Walking in the Park (2000); The Kettle (2001); The Best Of (2002); An Introduction To...Colosseum (2004); Live At The Boston Tea Party, August 1969 (2020); Live At The Montreux Jazz Festival 1969 (2020); Transmissions, Live At The BBC (2020)
	Tony Reeves	1968–1970; 1999 (live substitute for Mark Clarke)	bass	
	Jim Roche	1968	guitar	Those Who Are About to Die Salute You (1969) one track; Milestones (1989); Night Riding (1990); Daughter of Time (1991); The Ides of March (1995); Anthology (2000); An Introduction To...Colosseum (2004); Morituri Te Salutant (2009)
	Louis Cennamo	1970	bass	Daughter of Time (1970) four tracks; Epitaph (1986); Milestones (1989); Night Riding (1990); Daughter of Time (1991); The Ides of March (1995); Anthology (2000); Best - Walking in the Park (2000); An Introduction To...Colosseum (2004); Morituri Te Salutant (2009)
	Barbara Thompson	2004–2015 (guest appearances in 1970 and 2004) (died 2022)	saxophones; flute; backing vocals (1970)	Daughter of Time (1970) session appearance on 4 tracks; Epitaph (1986); Milestones (1989); Night Riding (1990); Daughter of Time (1991); The Time Machine (1991); The Ides of March (1995); Bread & Circuses (1997); Anthology (2000); Best - Walking in the Park (2000); Tomorrow's Blues (2003); An Introduction To...Colosseum (2004); Time on Our Side (2014)
	Adrian Askew	2020	organ; keyboards	none

=== Touring musicians ===
Image	Name	Years active	Instruments	Notes
	Paul Williams	1999 (died 2019)	vocals	live substitute for Chris Farlowe

== Discography ==
=== Studio albums ===
- Those Who Are About to Die Salute You (1969)
- Valentyne Suite (1969)
- The Grass Is Greener (1970) (U.S. release only)
- Daughter of Time (1970)
- Bread and Circuses (1997)
- Tomorrow's Blues (2003)
- Time on Our Side (2014)
- Restoration (2022)
- XI (2025)

=== Singles ===
- "Walking in the Park" / "Those About to Die, Salute You" – (1969)
- "Walking in the Park" / "The Road She Walked Before" – (1969)
- "The Kettle" / "Plenty Hard Luck" – (1969)
- "The Daughter of Time" / "Bring Out Your Dead" – (1971)

=== EPs ===
- Bread & Circuses – (1997)
- The Kettle – (2001)

=== Live albums ===
- Colosseum Live – (1971)
- LiveS The Reunion Concerts 1994 – (1995)
- Live Cologne 1994 – (2003)
- The Complete Reunion Concert – (2003)
- Live05 – (2007)
- Theme for a Reunion – (2009)
- Live At The Boston Tea Party, August 1969 – (2020)
- Live At The Montreux Jazz Festival 1969 – (2020)
- Live At Ruisrock, Turku, Finland, 1970 – (2020)
- Live At Piper Club, Rome, Italy 1971 – (2020)
- Live '71, Canterbury, Brighton & Manchester – (2020)
- Transmissions, Live At The BBC – (2020)

=== Compilation albums ===
- The Collectors Colosseum – (1971)
- Epitaph – (1986)
- Milestones – (1989) (2-CD collection)
- Night Riding – (1990)
- Daughter of Time – (1991)
- The Time Machine – (1991)
- The Ides of March – (1995)
- Anthology – (2000) (2-CD collection)
- Best - Walking in the Park – (2000)
- The Best Of – (2002)
- An Introduction To...Colosseum – (2004)
- Morituri Te Salutant – (2009) (4-CD collection)

=== DVD ===
- Colosseum LiveS : The Complete Reunion Concert Cologne 1994 – (2002)

== See also ==
- Tempest (UK band)
- Greenslade
- Colosseum II

== Literature ==
- Hanson, Martyn: Playing The Band - The Musical Life of Jon Hiseman, Edited by Colin Richardson 2010, London, Temple Music Books, ISBN 9780956686305
