= Bread and Circuses (disambiguation) =

Bread and circuses was how the Roman poet Juvenal characterized the imperial leadership's way of placating the masses.

Bread and Circuses may also refer to:

== Literature ==
- "The Code of Romulus" or "Bread and Circuses", a 2007 short story by Caroline Lawrence

== Music ==
- Tropicália: ou Panis et Circenses, an album by members of the Tropicalismo movement
- Bread and Circuses (Colosseum album), 1997
- Bread and Circuses (Graham Collier album), 2002
- Bread and Circuses (The View album), 2011
- Bread & Circus (Toad the Wet Sprocket album), 1989
- The Greatest Story Never Told Chapter 2: Bread and Circuses, a 2012 album by rapper Saigon
- "Bread and Circuses", the opening track of Harmony No Harmony by British post-hardcore band Million Dead

== Television ==
- "Bread and Circuses" (Star Trek: The Original Series), a 1968 episode of Star Trek
- "Bread and Circuses" (Hell on Wheels), a 2011 episode of Hell on Wheels
- "Bread and Circuses" (The Last Ship), a 2017 episode of The Last Ship

== See also ==
- Bread & Circus (store), a grocery store chain now part of Whole Foods Market
- Bread & Circus, a 1989 album by Toad the Wet Sprocket
- Pan y Circo, a 2020 Mexican TV series
- Brot und Spiele or Bread and Games, Germany's biggest Roman festival
- "Panis et Cirsenses", the opening track on the debut album by Brazilian band Os Mutantes
