= Mark Clarke (musician) =

English bassist (born 1950)

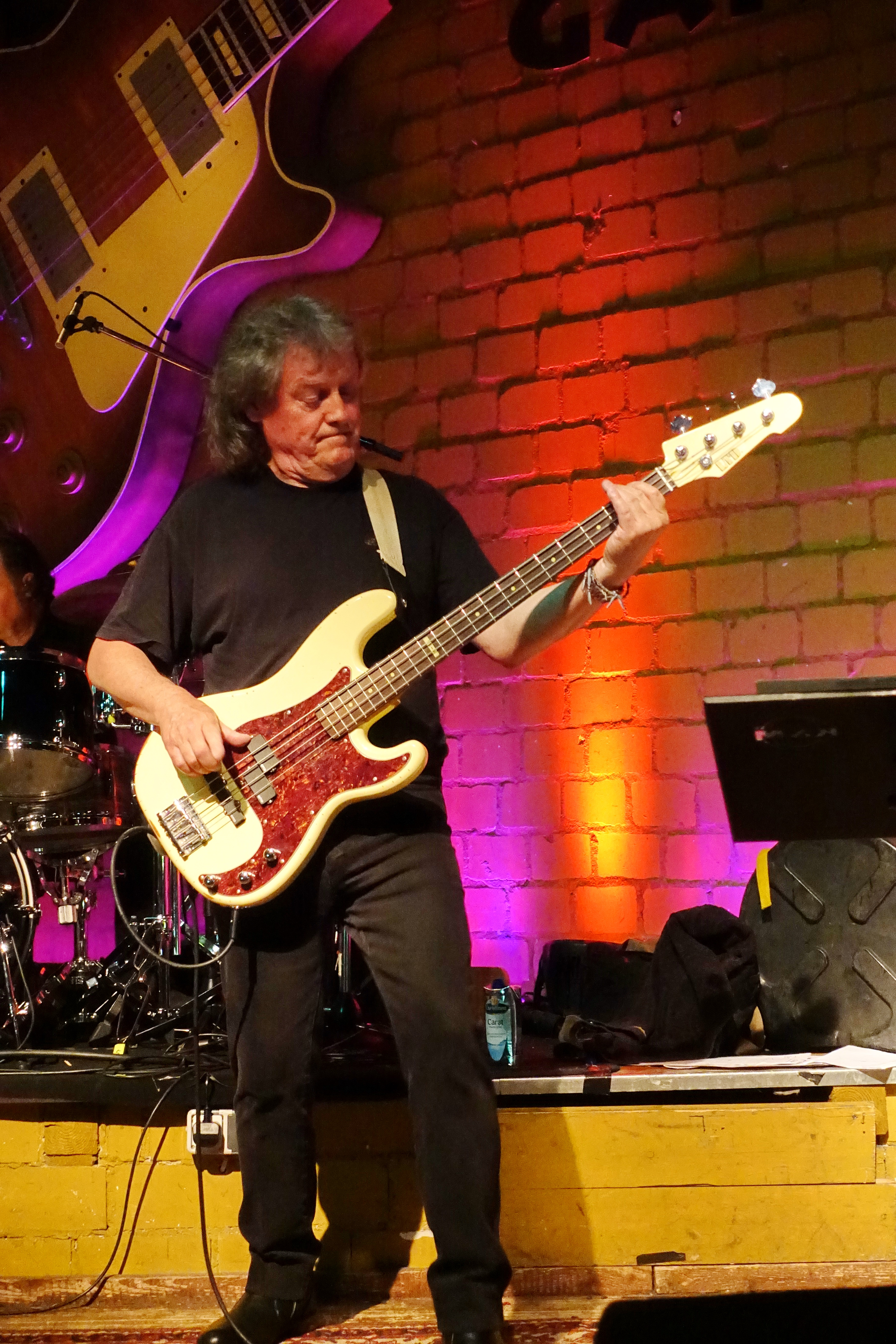
- Clarke with JCM in Bluesgarage Isernhagen Germany, April 2019

Background information
- Born: 25 July 1950 (age 76); Liverpool, England
- Genres: Jazz rock; hard rock; blues rock; progressive rock
- Occupation: Musician
- Instruments: Bass; vocals
- Years active: 1966–present
- Member of: Colosseum
- Formerly of: Uriah Heep; Tempest; Mountain; Rainbow

Mark Clarke (born 25 July 1950) is an English bassist and singer, best known for his work with Colosseum and Mountain, as well as brief stints with Uriah Heep and Rainbow.

== Career ==
After seeing the Beatles and many other bands in Liverpool as a young boy at the age of 12, he decided to be a bass player. In 1966, Clarke played with the Kegmen, in 1968 with the Locomotive and in late 1968 with St. James Infirmary. Liverpool Echo called him in an article "the Joe Cocker of Liverpool".

After a year of local gigs, he moved to London where he was introduced to Clem Clempson, who played at that time in Colosseum. Clarke was asked by Jon Hiseman to join Colosseum in the of summer 1970, and he played in the band until they split in late 1971, and again for 21 years from the reunion in 1994 till the farewell in 2015.

After Colosseum split he was briefly (1971-72) a member of Uriah Heep, performing on (and co-writing) one studio track, "The Wizard", on the 1972 album Demons and Wizards. At the beginning of 1973 he became a member of Jon Hiseman's Tempest and played bass on the band's two studio albums with Allan Holdsworth, Ollie Halsall and Paul Williams, and a live album issued later. He also played bass on Ken Hensley's solo albums.

In 1975 he formed Natural Gas with Joey Molland, Jerry Shirley and Peter Wood. He also played briefly with Ritchie Blackmore's Rainbow, but did not appear on any recordings. In 1978 he did a short US tour with the Henry Gross band.

In 1980 he started working with Billy Squier and recorded Don't Say No, The Stroke, In the Dark and many other albums. In 1986 he toured with the Monkees and worked for many years with Davy Jones. Clarke has also worked with Mountain (1984–85 and 1995–96) Ian Hunter and Torque, recording albums with all of them.

He played with Colosseum again from the reunion in 1994 to the farewell concert at the Shepherd's Bush Empire in London on 28 February 2015.

Clarke released his first solo album Moving to the Moon in 2010, which was co-produced by Ray DeTone, who also played all guitars on the record.

In 2017, Clarke became a member of a new trio band called JCM, with fellow former members of Colosseum Jon Hiseman and Clem Clempson. The band recorded an album, "Heroes", which was released in April 2018. JCM begun touring Europe in April 2018 but the tour ended after the show in Bonn on 22 April due Jon Hiseman's illness. Hiseman died in June 2018, which initially appeared to be the end of JCM; however in early 2019 it was announced that the band would continue with Ralph Salmins taking over drums. Tours of Europe and the UK took place throughout 2019.

Clarke continues to be a member of Colosseum after their reunion in 2019, as well as contributing to their 2022 album Restoration.

== Discography ==
Colosseum

- 1970 – Daughter of Time
- 1971 – Colosseum Live
- 1994 – Colosseum LiveS – The Reunion Concerts
- 1997 – Bread and Circuses
- 2003 – Tomorrow's Blues
- 2007 – Live05
- 2014 – Time On Our Side
- 2022 – Restoration

Uriah Heep

- 1972 – Demons and Wizards

Tempest

- 1973 – Tempest
- 1974 – Live in London
- 1974 – Living in Fear

Natural Gas

- 1976 - Natural Gas

Ken Hensley

- 1973 - Proud Words on a Dusty Shelf
- 1975 – Eager to Please
- 1980 – Free Spirit
- 1994 – From Time to Time (compilation)

Richard T. Bear

- 1979 - Captured Alive

Billy Squier

- 1981 - Don't Say No
- 1991 - Creatures of Habit

Ian Hunter

- 1983 – All of the Good Ones Are Taken

Michael Bolton

- 1983 - Michael Bolton

The Monkees

- 1986 - Davy Jones / Micky Dolenz / Peter Tork: 20th Anniversary Tour

Mountain

- 1985 – Go for Your Life
- 1996 – Man's World

Torque

- 2003 - 103103

Solo albums

- 2010 – Moving to the Moon

JCM

- 2018 - Heroes
