= Big Chief (British band) =

British jazz band

Big Chief is a British jazz band that also incorporates blues influences. The band is described by The Observer as "an institution as much as a band, bundling jazz, blues and soul in one bag and shaking them vigorously". Its members included John Fry, saxophonist Dick Heckstall-Smith, and Tony Reeves.

The band's history, CDs and samples are available at their website.

== Band members ==
Big Chief's band members were as follows:

- Edward Benstead - Trumpet
- John Fry - Saxophone/Vocals
- Tony Reeves - Bass
- Tony Edwards - Percussion/Vocals
- Barry Langton - Guitar
- Steve Taylor - Drums
- Chris Fry - Trombone
- Adrian Paton - Keyboards/Vocals

== Discography ==
Details and options to purchase Big Chief's albums can be found at the Big Chief website.

- It don't make sense (1997)
- Steppin' Out (1999)
- Big Chief Live at the Bull (2003)
- Big Chief Live at the Dignity (2009)
- Big Chief On Broadway (2010)
