= New Jazz Orchestra =

British jazz big band

The New Jazz Orchestra (NJO) was a British jazz big band that was active from 1963 to 1970. Neil Ardley recorded several more albums with many of the NJO's members, which were released under his own name.

== Origins and members ==
The NJO was the offspring of a popular weekend jazz club, the "Jazzhouse" based at the Green Man, Blackheath (demolished to make way for Allison Close) where the "house" band was the Ian Bird Quintet (initially comprising Ian Bird, tenor sax; Clive Burrows, baritone sax; Johnny Mealing, piano; Tony Reeves, bass and Trevor Tomkins, drums - Mealing and Tomkins left to join the newly formed Rendell-Carr Quintet and were succeeded by Paul Raymond and Jon Hiseman respectively.

The ensemble featured many London-based jazz musicians, such as Harry Beckett, Jack Bruce, Ian Carr, Dave Gelly, Michael Gibbs, Dick Heckstall-Smith, Jon Hiseman, Henry Lowther, Don Rendell, Frank Ricotti, Paul Rutherford, Barbara Thompson, Trevor Tomkins, Michael Phillipson, Les Carter, Tom Harris, Trevor Watts and Lionel Grigson. Ardley, Gibbs, Carter, Rutherford, Michael Garrick, and composer Mike Taylor all contributed pieces and arrangements.

The idea for the NJO was born in the autumn of 1963 out of an enthusiastic late night conversation "about big bands and possibilities" between Clive Burrows and Les Carter (one of the club's regular helpers and poster writer). The conversation ended with the decision to form such a band around the kernel of the Ian Bird Quintet - Burrows had the "book" (of musicians' telephone numbers) and Carter (himself a developing amateur flautist) undertook to write some arrangements to help swell the initial repertoire.

The newly formed band finally debuted at The Green Man at Christmas, 1963 as "The Bird/Burrows Big Band". Following the departure (in 1964) of Ian Bird from the group, the band briefly became "The Neoteric Jazz Orchestra" but later settled for "The New Jazz Orchestra" (NJO).

Later in 1964, the NJO found itself leaderless (Burrows had left to go pro), largely gigless and somewhat wanting in enthusiasm. Ian Carr (who had by then joined the trumpet section) approached Les Carter (who was directing rehearsals) with the suggestion that a friend of his might bring along an arrangement for the band to play through. The "friend" turned out to be pianist and composer Neil Ardley, and the arrangement was of Duke Ellington's "In a Mellow Tone". It was not long after this that Ardley was invited by the members to take over the leadership of the NJO - a mantle that he assumed until 1971.

Under Ardley, a self-confessed disciple of Gil Evans, the NJO personnel and instrumentation varied in a chameleonic fashion, following the colours of his evolving arranging and composing style. However, the (almost) original palette of instruments and personnel was at last reunited in 1993 for a celebratory 30th-anniversary gig at the Barbican Centre, London.

== Discography ==
- Western Reunion (Decca, 1965)
- Le Déjeuner sur l'Herbe (Verve, 1969) – released on CD in 2015 by Dusk Fire Records
- Camden '70 (live at the Camden Festival) (Dusk Fire, 2008) – rec. 1970
- On The Radio: BBC Sessions 1971 with Neil Ardley (Dusk Fire, 2017) – rec. 1971

== Bibliography ==
- Playing the Band: The Musical Life of Jon Hiseman. Written by Martyn Hanson. Edited by Colin Richardson. Temple Music, 2010.
