= MTR Professional Audio =

British audio equipment manufacturer

MTR Professional Audio is a UK sound technology company founded in the latter 20th century by the musician Tony Reeves. It supplies audio amplifiers, signal connectors, EQ, power supplies and other studio hardware. Products have drawn favourable reviews from the trade press.

Apart from manufacturing 'problem-solver' audio products such as the RaxX expandable 19" rack-mounting system, MTR distributes the Dutch stageClix digital wireless system for guitars, basses, microphones etc., Mcgregor UK-made mixer-amplifiers, power amplifiers, speakers, karaoke systems, the Californian A-Designs boutique audio products including the REDDI valve DI box, Pacifica microphone preamplifier, Hammer valve EQ. The most recent addition is the American Galaxy Audio Hotspot powered and unpowered personal monitors.
