= The Wizard (Uriah Heep song) =

Single by Uriah Heep

from the album Demons and Wizards
- B-side: "Why" (EU/US) "Gypsy" (UK/JPN)
- Released: 10 March 1972
- Genre: Progressive rock, folk rock
- Length: 2:59
- Label: Bronze; Mercury
- Songwriters: Ken Hensley, Mark Clarke
- Producer: Gerry Bron

Uriah Heep singles chronology
"Look at Yourself" (1971)	"The Wizard" (1972)	"Easy Livin'" (1972)

"The Wizard" is a song by British rock band Uriah Heep, from their 1972 album Demons and Wizards. It was the first single to be lifted from the album. It was composed by Mark Clarke and Ken Hensley. It is a gentle, semi-acoustic ballad whose lyrics deal with a wanderer meeting "the Wizard of a thousand kings". This song is the first Uriah Heep single which had a music video.

The song was composed by keyboardist-guitarist Ken Hensley and the band's short time bassist Mark Clarke. "The Wizard" also was the only composition that includes Clarke as a member of the band. The song charted at #34 in Germany and at #8 in Switzerland.

== Personnel ==
- Mick Box – guitar
- Lee Kerslake – drums
- Mark Clarke – vocals, bass guitar
- Ken Hensley – keyboards, 12-string acoustic guitar
- David Byron – lead vocals

== Charts ==
Chart (1972)	Peak position
Canada Top Singles (RPM)	86
Switzerland (Schweizer Hitparade)	8
West Germany (GfK)	34
