= Kiri Sings Karl =

Studio album by Kiri Te Kanawa
- Released: 26 September 2006
- Genre: Classical
- Label: EMI Classics

Kiri Te Kanawa chronology
The Very Best Of (2003)	Kiri Sings Karl (2006)

Kiri Sings Karl: Songs of Mystery & Enchantment is a 2006 classical album by New Zealand opera singer Kiri Te Kanawa, with the London Symphony Orchestra, conducted by Karl Jenkins. The pieces were composed by Karl Jenkins, or arranged by him, based on compositions of other composers, like the Argentine composer Carlos Guastavino.

== Background ==
In 2005 Richard Lyttelton, then President of EMI Classics, suggested to Karl Jenkins to develop a recording project, together with Kiri te Kanawa. Kiri introduced the repertoire of the Argentinian composers Carlos Guastavino and Alberto Ginastera. Karl arranged some compositions that made use of indigenous percussion instruments.

== Track listing ==
1. Jardin antiguo (English: Ancient garden) – 2:48 (Carlos Guastavino, from Las Nubes; arr. Karl Jenkins)
2. Kyrie – 3:31 (Traditional / Ariel Ramirez, from Misa Criolla, arr. Karl Jenkins)
3. Le secret, 'For James', Op. 23 no 3 – 2:48 (Gabriel Fauré, arr. Karl Jenkins)
4. Antema Africana – 3:50 (Karl Jenkins)
5. Canciones (2), Op. 3: no 2, Canción al árbol del olvido "Milonga" – 3:33 (Alberto Ginastera, from Dos Canciones Argentinas Op. 3; arr. Karl Jenkins)
6. Y Cyfrinwyr (The Mystics) – 7:54 (Karl Jenkins)

Flores argentinas (Carlos Guastavino, arr. Karl Jenkins):
7. Cortadera, Plumerito (English: Cortadera, little plume) – 2:39
8. El clavel del aire blanco (English: The white carnation of the air) – 2:56
9. Que Linda la madreselva! (English: How lovely is the honeysuckle!) – 2:07
10. Ay, Aljaba, flor de chilco (English: Ah, aljaba, flower of the chilco) – 1:36

11. Requiem: In paradisum – 5:25 (Karl Jenkins)
12. La rosa y el sauce (English: The rose and the willow) – 3:49 (Carlos Guastavino, arr. Karl Jenkins)
13. Capriccio d'Amore (English: Capricious love) – 3:55 (Karl Jenkins)
14. Allegrettango – 5:13 (Karl Jenkins, after Ludwig van Beethoven)
15. Mazurka – 4:25 (Karl Jenkins, after Frédéric Chopin)
16. Paya Paya – 3:47 (Karl Jenkins)

== Performing musicians ==
- Kiri te Kanawa, soprano (Kiri's voice is multi-tracked up to nine times). Dame Kiri Te Kanawa sings in Welsh, Spanish, French, Portuguese, Latin and the language made by Jenkins.
- The London Symphony Orchestra, conducted by Karl Jenkins. Leader: Duncan Riddell.
- Moray Welsh and Rebecca Gilliver, cellos on 'The Mystics.'
- Gareth Davies, flute on 'Canción al árbol del olvido.'
- Jody K. Jenkins, percussion.
- Pamela Thorby, recorders.
- Martin Taylor, guitar on 'Allegrettango' and 'Paya Paya.'
- Clem Clempson, guitar on 'The Mystics.'
- Seung-Wook Seong, baritone on 'Kyrie.'
- choir: The Adiemus singers: Pirjo Aittomäki, Mervi Hiltunen-Multamäki, Anna-Mari Kähärä, Merja Rajala, Säde Rissanen, Hanna-Riika Siitonen, Mia Simanainen, Nina Tapio, Riika Timonen (manager: Irma Tapio). This Finnish group has been recorded in a Helsinki studio.

== Critical reception ==
Kaikkonen and Elliot in 2006 welcomed the 'mix-and-match' of world music and the classical voice of Kiri. In their opinion this album showed a great flexibility, both in terms of thinking and singing and formed a bridge between various musical genres.
