= Tempest (British band) =

British rock band (1972–1974)

- Origin: United Kingdom
- Genres: Hard rock, progressive rock
- Years active: 1972–1974
- Spinoff of: Colosseum
- Past members: Jon Hiseman; Mark Clarke; Allan Holdsworth; Paul Williams; Ollie Halsall

Tempest was a British rock band active from 1972 to 1974. Its core members were Jon Hiseman on drums and Mark Clarke on bass. They released two studio albums before breaking up.

== History ==
Hiseman and Clarke had played in Colosseum together and formed Tempest at the beginning of 1973. For the band's first, eponymous album (originally called Jon Hiseman's Tempest), the line-up was completed by Allan Holdsworth on guitar and Paul Williams on vocals and keyboards.

Later in Tempest's brief history, they were joined by Ollie Halsall, who had played guitar with progressive rock band Patto. With two guitarists, the group played a number of shows beginning with a June 1973 show at Golders Green Hippodrome, London, which was broadcast by the BBC and later released as a bootleg erroneously entitled Live in London 1974. By the time a second album was recorded, 1974's Living in Fear, Tempest was down to a trio, consisting of Hiseman, Clarke, and Halsall; reportedly Holdsworth didn't want to play alongside a second guitarist. The band broke up soon after.

In 2005, a double CD anthology was released entitled Under the Blossom which featured remastered editions of the two studio albums, two previously unreleased studio tracks from the Living in Fear era and the BBC live recording of the June 1973 concert at Golders Green with the two guitar line-up.

== Discography ==
=== Tempest ===
Tempest

Studio album by Tempest
- Released: March 1973
- Recorded: London, England, October–November 1972
- Studios: Air London, England
- Producer: Jon Hiseman

Side 1:

1. "Gorgon" (Hiseman/Clarke/Holdsworth) – 5:41
2. "Foyers of Fun" (Hiseman/Clarke/Holdsworth) – 3:38
3. "Dark House" (Hiseman/Clarke/Holdsworth) – 5:00
4. "Brothers" (Hiseman/Holdsworth) – 3:35

Side 2:

1. "Up and On" (John Edwards/Holdsworth) – 4:16
2. "Grey and Black" (Clarke/Suzy Bottomley) – 2:26
3. "Strangeher" (Clarke/Hiseman) – 4:07
4. "Upon Tomorrow" (Clem Clempson/Hiseman) – 6:15

Personnel

- Paul Williams: vocals, acoustic guitar, keyboards
- Allan Holdsworth: guitars, vocals, violin
- Mark Clarke: bass, keyboards; vocals on "Grey and Black"
- Jon Hiseman: drums, percussion

=== Living in Fear ===
Living in Fear

Studio album by Tempest
- Released: 1974
- Recorded: London, October–November 1973
- Producer: Gerry Bron

Side 1:

1. "Funeral Empire" (Halsall) – 4:25
2. "Paperback Writer" (Lennon–McCartney) – 2:30
3. "Stargazer" (Clarke/Bottomley) – 3:36
4. "Dance to My Tune" (Clarke/Bottomley) – 7:50

Side 2:

1. "Living in Fear" (Halsall) – 4:19
2. "Yeah Yeah Yeah" (Halsall/Hiseman) – 3:40
3. "Waiting for a Miracle" (Halsall) – 5:18
4. "Turn Around" (Clarke/Bottomley) – 6:12

Personnel

- Ollie Halsall - guitars, Moog synthesizer, piano, vocals
- Mark Clarke - bass guitar, vocals
- Jon Hiseman - drums, percussion

=== Under the Blossom (double CD anthology) ===
Disc 1:

1. "Gorgon"
2. "Foyers of Fun"
3. "Dark House"
4. "Brothers"
5. "Up and On"
6. "Grey and Black"
7. "Strangeher"
8. "Upon Tomorrow"
9. "Funeral Empire"
10. "Paperback Writer"
11. "Stargazer"
12. "Dance to My Tune"
13. "Living in Fear"
14. "Yeah, Yeah, Yeah"
15. "Waiting for a Miracle"
16. "Turn Around"

Disc 2:

1. "You and Your Love" (previously unreleased)
2. "Dream Train" (previously unreleased)
3. "Foyers of Fun" (BBC In Concert)
4. "Gorgon" (BBC In Concert)
5. "Up and On" (BBC In Concert)
6. "Grey and Black" (BBC In Concert)
7. "Brothers" (BBC In Concert)
8. "Drums Away" (BBC In Concert)
9. "Strangeher" (BBC In Concert)
