= Mike Taylor (British musician) =

British jazz composer and songwriter

Michael Ronald Taylor (1 June 1938 in Ealing, West London – 19 January 1969) was a British jazz composer, pianist, and co-songwriter for the band Cream.

== Biography ==
Mike Taylor was brought up by his grandparents in Ealing, West London and Kent, and learned to play piano before joining the RAF for his national service. Once this was completed he began to perform, most notably at the all night jazz sessions in the basement of the Nucleus coffee bar in Covent Garden. During this period he played with musicians including Jack Bruce and Ginger Baker, saxophonist Dave Tomlin, drummer Jon Hiseman and bassist Tony Reeves. In 1966 he recorded two albums for the Lansdowne series produced by Denis Preston: Pendulum (1966, with Tomlin, Hiseman and Reeves) and Trio (1967) with Hiseman, Bruce and bassist Ron Rubin. The albums were issued on UK Columbia.

During his brief recording career, several of Taylor's pieces were played and recorded by his contemporaries. Three Taylor compositions were recorded by Cream, with lyrics by drummer Ginger Baker: "Passing the Time", "Pressed Rat and Warthog" and "Those Were the Days", all of which appeared on the band's August 1968 album Wheels of Fire. Neil Ardley's New Jazz Orchestra's September 1968 recording Le Déjeuner Sur L’Herbe features one original Taylor composition, "Ballad", and an arrangement by him of a piece by Alexandre Tansman, "Study".

Mike Taylor drowned in the River Thames near Leigh-on-Sea, Essex, in January 1969, following years of heavy drug use (principally hashish and LSD). He had been homeless for three years, and his death was almost entirely unremarked.

In 2007, the independent record label, Dusk Fire Records, released for the first time the album Mike Taylor Remembered, a 1973 tribute to the musician recorded by Ardley, Hiseman, Ian Carr, Barbara Thompson, Tony Reeves, and other major modern British jazz players. It included two previously unheard Taylor compositions, "Timewind" and "Jumping off the Sun". Tony Higgins has claimed that Taylor composed over 200 pieces, but only a handful were ever recorded or performed.

In 2015, Gonzo Multimedia published Out of Nowhere, the first biography on Taylor, by Italian writer Luca Ferrari. Vinyl re-issues of the two LPs were released in July 2025.

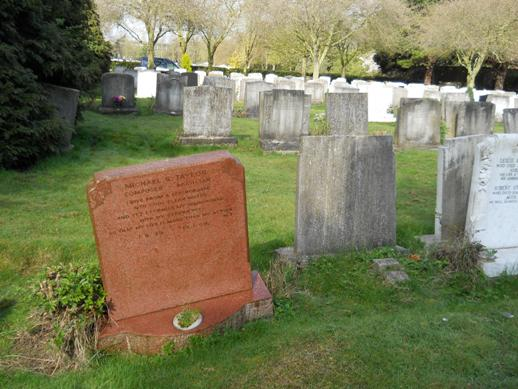
Mike Taylor is buried in Sutton Road Cemetery, Southend on Sea.

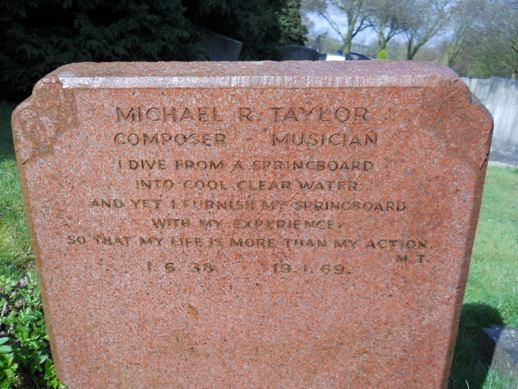
"I dive from a springboard into cool clear water and yet I furnish my springboard with my experience so that my life is more than my action". M.T. 1.6.38 – 19.1.69

== See also ==
- Graham Bond
- Pete Brown
- Janet Godfrey
