= James Litherland =

English musician (born 1949)

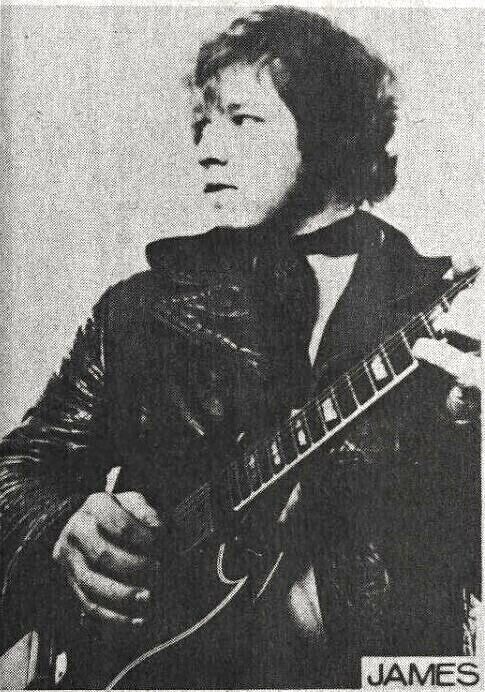
- Litherland with Colosseum c. 1970

Background information
- Born: 6 September 1949 (age 76); Salford, Lancashire, England
- Origin: Ipswich, Suffolk, England
- Genres: Jazz rock; progressive rock
- Instruments: Guitar; vocals
- Years active: 1968–present
- Label: Confidential
- Formerly of: Mogul Thrash; Colosseum; Million; Bandit
- Children: James Blake (son)
- Website: www.jameslitherland.com

James Litherland (born 6 September 1949) is an English singer and guitarist best known as a founding member of the progressive rock band Colosseum. He is the father of singer and producer James Blake, who adapted his father's song "Where to Turn" into "The Wilhelm Scream".

== Discography ==
With Colosseum

- Those Who Are About to Die Salute You – 1968
- Valentyne Suite – 1969
- The Grass Is Greener – 1970

With Mogul Thrash

- Mogul Thrash 1971

With John Baldry

- Everything Stops for Tea, 1972

With Leo Sayer

- Just a Boy, 1974

With Bandit

- Bandit, 1976

Solo

- 4th Estate, 2006
- Real Men Cry, 2006

As Session Musician

- Finbar Furey with The Fureys, 1968
- Fly On Strangewings with Jade, 1970
- Stranded with Edwards Hand, 1970
- Rainshine with Edwards Hand, 1971
- Marriott with Steve Marriott, 1976
- The Party Album with Alexis Korner, 1979
