= Neil Ardley =

British jazz composer, musician and author (1937–2004)

Background information
- Born: Neil Richard Ardley; 26 May 1937; Wallington, Surrey, England
- Died: 23 February 2004 (aged 66) Bakewell, Derbyshire, England
- Education: Bristol University
- Genres: Jazz
- Occupations: Pianist, composer, author
- Instrument: Piano
- Years active: 1960–2004
- Website: neilardley.com

Neil Richard Ardley (26 May 1937 – 23 February 2004) was a prominent English jazz composer and pianist, who from 1964 to 1970 was director of the New Jazz Orchestra. He also made his name as the author of more than 100 popular books on science and technology, and on music.

== Early years ==
Neil Ardley was born in Wallington, Surrey. He attended Wallington County Grammar School and at the age of 13 started to learn the piano and later the saxophone. He read Chemistry at Bristol University, where he also played both piano and saxophone in jazz groups, and from which he graduated in 1959 with a BSc degree.

== Career ==
=== Music ===
Ardley moved to London and studied arranging and composing with Ray Premru and Bill Russo from 1960 to 1961. He joined the John Williams Big Band as pianist, writing both arrangements and new compositions, and from 1964 to 1970 was the director of the newly formed New Jazz Orchestra, which employed some of the best young musicians in London, including Ian Carr, Jon Hiseman, Barbara Thompson, Dave Gelly, Mike Gibbs, Don Rendell, and Trevor Tomkins.

In the late 1960s, encouraged by record producer and impresario Denis Preston, Ardley began composing in earnest, combining classical and jazz methods. The New Jazz Orchestra album Le Déjeuner sur l'Herbe (1969), taking some inspiration from the orchestral jazz of Gil Evans, is now considered a classic of British jazz. While it includes intricate arrangements of "Nardis" by Miles Davis and "Naima" by John Coltrane, the rest of the pieces on the album tend to look beyond the dominant African-American influences and were composed by young writers associated with the orchestra – including Ardley himself on the extended title track, Michael Garrick, Mike Gibbs, Howard Riley and Mike Taylor. Although not issued under the New Jazz Orchestra name, Ardley's subsequent releases Greek Variations and Other Aegean Exercises (1970) and Symphony of Amaranths (1972) continued the orchestra and its aesthetic in all but name, and were critically acclaimed.

His rich orchestrations were augmented in the 1970s by the addition of synthesisers. Kaleidoscope Of Rainbows reached number 22 in the New Musical Express top 24 albums of 1976. Duncan Heining judges it to be "his masterpiece". However, as he began work on an all-electronic album in 1980, Ardley's recording contract was suddenly terminated, and he fell back on his writing and publishing career. He continued to play and compose, especially with Zyklus, the electronic jazz group he formed with composer (and former student) John L. Walters, Derbyshire musician Warren Greveson and Ian Carr.

Singing in local choirs in the later 1990s led Ardley to start composing choral music, and this occupied most of his musical attention until his death. At the time of his death, Ardley had begun to gig and record again with a slimmed down Zyklus consisting of himself, Warren Greaveson, and Nick Robinson.

=== Writing ===
Ardley joined the editorial staff of the World Book Encyclopedia in 1962, when the London branch of the American publisher was producing an international edition. This took four years, during which time he developed the skill of editing and writing introductory material for the young. After a brief period working for Hamlyn publishers, he became a freelance editor in 1968 (which enabled him to continue with his musical career). In the 1970s, he moved into writing introductory books, mostly for children, on natural history (especially birds), science and technology, and music, such as What Is It?.

Just as his composing and performance had been moved forward by the introduction and development of technology, so too with his publishing career, as computers began to become more and more important. In 1984, Ardley began to write mainly for publishing company Dorling Kindersley, producing a series of books that included the best-selling (more than three million copies worldwide) and award-winning The Way Things Work (1988), illustrated by David Macaulay, as well as the Eyewitness volume Music, first published in 1989.

When he retired in 2000, Ardley had written 101 books, with total sales of about ten million.

== Personal life ==
In 1960, Ardley married Bridget Gantley, and the couple had one daughter. With Bridget, he acted as a researcher for the BBC television programme Mastermind. In 2003, he married Vivien Wilson. He died in Milford, Derbyshire, where Vivien still lives. She published a full-length biography of Neil Ardley in 2023.

== Works ==
Selected choral compositions include:

- Creation Mass (2001), a setting of 11 poems by long-term collaborator Patrick Huddie
- Cantabile (2003), commissioned by Bakewell Choral Society to mark its 25th anniversary

== Discography ==
- 1965: The New Jazz Orchestra, Western Reunion (Decca, 1965)
- 1968: The New Jazz Orchestra, Le Déjeuner sur l'Herbe (Verve, 1969)
- 1970?: Greek Variations & Other Aegean Exercises with Ian Carr & Don Rendell (Columbia, 1970)
- 1970: The New Jazz Orchestra, Camden '70 (Dusk Fire, 2008) – live at the Camden Festival
- 1971: Mediterranean Intrigue (with John Leach), KPM 1000 Series, KPM 1084
- 1971: A Symphony of Amaranths (Regal Zonophone, 1972)
- 1971: The New Jazz Orchestra, On The Radio: BBC Sessions 1971 (Dusk Fire, 2017)
- 1973: Mike Taylor Remembered with Jon Hiseman, Barbara Thompson, Ian Carr, Henry Lowther, Dave Gelly, Norma Winstone (Trunk, 2007)
- 1975: Kaleidoscope of Rainbows - QEH, 20th October 1975 (Jazz In Britain, 2021) [2CD] – live at the Queen Elizabeth Hall
- 1975: Will Power - includes Ardley's "Shall I Compare Thee", Southwark Cathedral, 27 April 1974 (Argo, 1975)
- 1978: Harmony of the Spheres (Decca, 1989)
- 1991?: Zyklus, Virtual Realities (AMP, 1991)
- 2000: Creation Mass words by Patrick Huddie

== Sources and external links ==
- Ardley, Vivien. Neil Ardley: Kaleidoscopes and Rainbows, Jazz in Britain (2023), with additional chapters by John Coles and Dave Gelly.
- Carr, Ian, Digby Fairweather, & Brian Priestley. Jazz: The Rough Guide. London: Rough Guides. ISBN 1-85828-528-3
- Ardley, Neil, David Lambert and Mark Lambert. What Is It? Question and Answer Encyclopedia. London: Kingfisher Books. ISBN 0-671-68467-1
- Neil Ardley Official Website – includes lists of his books and compositions.
- Neil Ardley – biographical sketch by Eugene Chadbourne for AllMusic.
- Playing the Band: The Musical life of Jon Hiseman, by Martyn Hanson. Edited by Colin Richardson. ISBN 9780956686305
- Alyn Shipton, Out of the Long Dark: The Life of Ian Carr, Equinox Publishing, 2006. ISBN (paperback), 1845532228; ISBN (paperback) 9781845532222
- John L. Walters, "Neil Ardley" (obituary), The Guardian, 4 March 2004.
