= Backwater Blues =

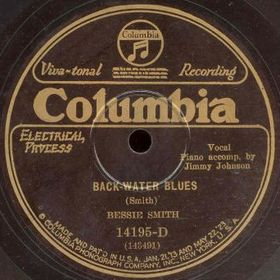

Single by Bessie Smith
- B-side: "Preachin' the Blues"
- Released: 1927
- Recorded: New York City, February 17, 1927
- Genre: Blues
- Length: 3:19
- Label: Columbia
- Songwriter: Bessie Smith

The song "Backwater Blues" is a blues and jazz standard written by Bessie Smith. Smith (on vocal with James P. Johnson on piano) recorded it as "Back-water Blues" on February 17, 1927, in New York City. Its musical composition entered the public domain on January 1, 2023.

== Background ==
The song has long been associated with the Great Mississippi Flood of 1927. However, study of Smith's touring itinerary, of testimony of fellow entertainers who toured with her, and of contemporary reports indicates that the song was written in response to the flood that struck Nashville, Tennessee, on Christmas Day 1926. The Cumberland River, which flows through the city, rose 56 feet (17 m) above its normal level, still a record as of 2020.

== Composition ==
The lyrics are in the often-used AAB blues format. The words vary from one performer to another; this opening verse is representative:

When it rains five days, and the skies turn dark as night (2×)
There's trouble taking place in the lowland that night

== See also ==
- List of jazz standards
