= Dave Greenslade =

English composer and keyboard player (1943–2026)

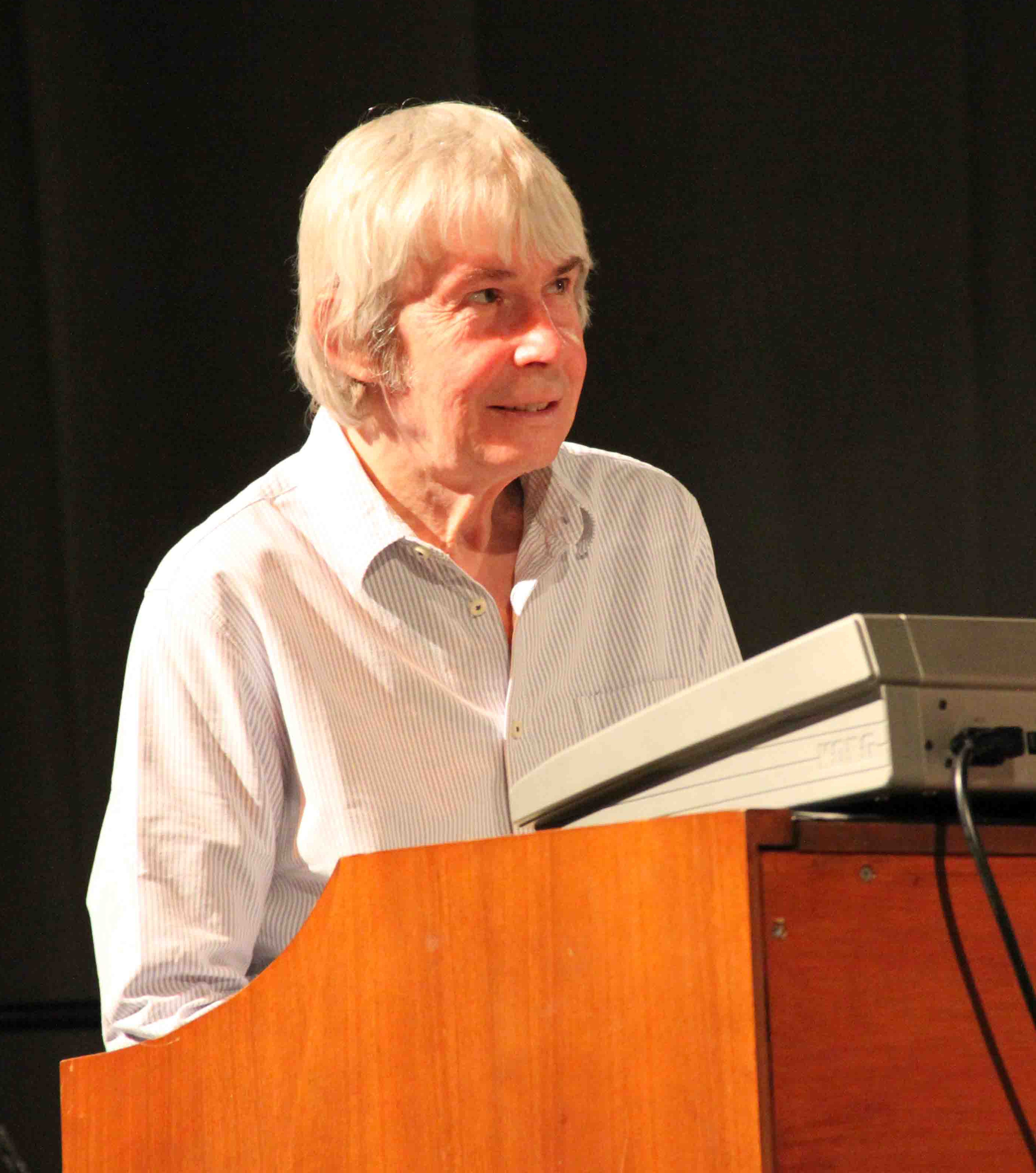
- Greenslade in 2011

Background information
- Born: David John Greenslade; 18 January 1943; Woking, Surrey, England
- Died: 14 June 2026 (aged 83) Bungay, Suffolk, England
- Genres: Rock; progressive rock
- Occupations: Keyboardist; composer
- Instruments: Piano; keyboards; Hammond organ
- Years active: 1960s–2021
- Label: Warner Bros.
- Website: temple-music.com/dave-greenslade

David John Greenslade (18 January 1943 – 14 June 2026) was an English composer and keyboard player. He played with Colosseum from their formation in 1968 until their farewell concert in 2015, and also from 1973 in his own band, Greenslade, and others including If and Chris Farlowe's Thunderbirds.

== Early life ==
David John Greenslade was born in Woking, Surrey, England on 18 January 1943. His mother was a singer and pianist who sang in the local church choir. A common misconception is that Greenslade was the son of composer Arthur Greenslade; however, he revealed in interviews that he was actually the son of a pianist called Jack Greenslade, who ran a dance club in the 1930s.

His family moved to Eltham in South East London when he was a child. His parents encouraged him to play the piano. He joined a local church youth club when he was thirteen and met Jon Hiseman and Tony Reeves; the three would become founding members of Colosseum. With Hiseman, he played in his first band as a teenager, The Wes Minster Five.

== Career ==
Greenslade was recruited by Clive Burrows to join Geno Washington & the Ram Jam Band in August 1968. Four months later, he left the Ram Jam Band to form Colosseum. Greenslade was a constant member of the band until 2015. He joined the band If for a year in 1972, touring with them in Italy, but left before an American tour to form his own band, Greenslade.

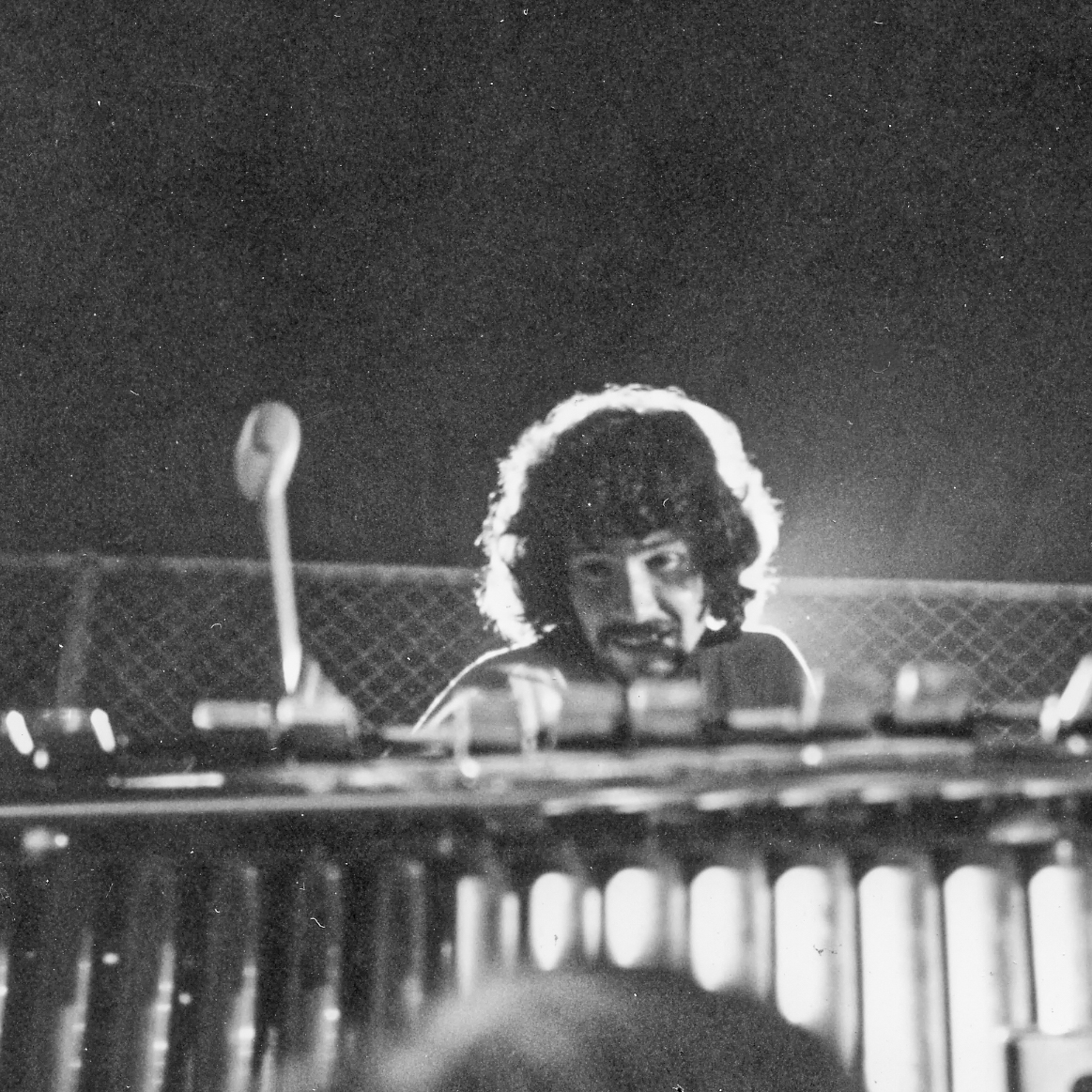
Greenslade in 1970

The Greenslade band lasted for four years, producing four studio albums and disbanding in 1976. After the band, he focused on his own solo albums. Among his solo works are Cactus Choir (1976), The Pentateuch of the Cosmogony (1979; with art by Patrick Woodroffe) and From the Discworld (1994). Greenslade's television work includes music for the BBC series Gangsters (1975–1978), Bird of Prey (1982–1984) and A Very Peculiar Practice (1986), the theme to which was sung by Elkie Brooks.

In the mid 1980s, Greenslade vanished from the public eye for nearly a decade. His association with author Terry Pratchett brought him back into public view with the 1994 release of From the Discworld, an album of music inspired by Pratchett's novels. Greenslade was active in the second formation of Colosseum, which was formed in 1994 after Greenslade met with the former bandmates at his surprise 50th birthday party. They toured again until 2015; the band would return five years later, reforming in 2020, but without Greenslade.

He returned to his solo career with the release of the 2011 solo studio album, Routes/Roots, which was his latest solo release. He performed in the duo G&T with blues musician David Thomas, who was the guitarist in the Newport rock group Blonde on Blonde.

== Death ==
Greenslade died in Bungay, Suffolk on 14 June 2026, aged 83.

== Instruments ==
Greenslade said he used the following keyboards throughout his career: Yamaha CS-60, Clavinet, the L-100, C3 and A-100 model Hammond organs, Cat synthesiser, Yamaha DX7, Korg Trinity, Crumar Stringman, Fender Rhodes Electric Piano, Mellotron 400, Wurlitzer Electric Piano, A.R.P. Synth, R.M.I. Electric Piano, Roland U-20, Roland Vocoder, and Yamaha CS-80; as of 2023, he was using Yamaha CP73 and the Hammond XK-1C on stage.

== Influences ==
Greenslade mentioned the following pianists as influences: Bill Evans, Duke Ellington, Count Basie, the Modern Jazz Quartet, Dave Brubeck and Joe Zawinul.

== Discography ==
=== Colosseum ===
- Those Who Are About to Die Salute You (1969)
- Valentyne Suite (1969)
- Daughter of Time (1970)
- Colosseum Live (1971)
- LiveS The Reunion Concerts 1994 – (1995)
- Live Cologne 1994 – (2003)
- Live '05 – (2007)
- Bread & Circuses – (1997)
- Tomorrow's Blues – (2003)
- Time On Our Side (2014)

=== Greenslade ===
- Greenslade (1973)
- Bedside Manners Are Extra (1973)
- Spyglass Guest (1974)
- Time and Tide (1975)
- Live
- Large Afternoon (2000)
- Greenslade 2001 – Live the Full Edition (2002)

=== Solo ===
- Cactus Choir (1976)
- The Pentateuch of the Cosmogony (1979)
- From the Discworld (1994)
- Going South (1999)
- Routes/Roots (2011)
