= Jon Hiseman =

English drummer and sound engineer (1944–2018)

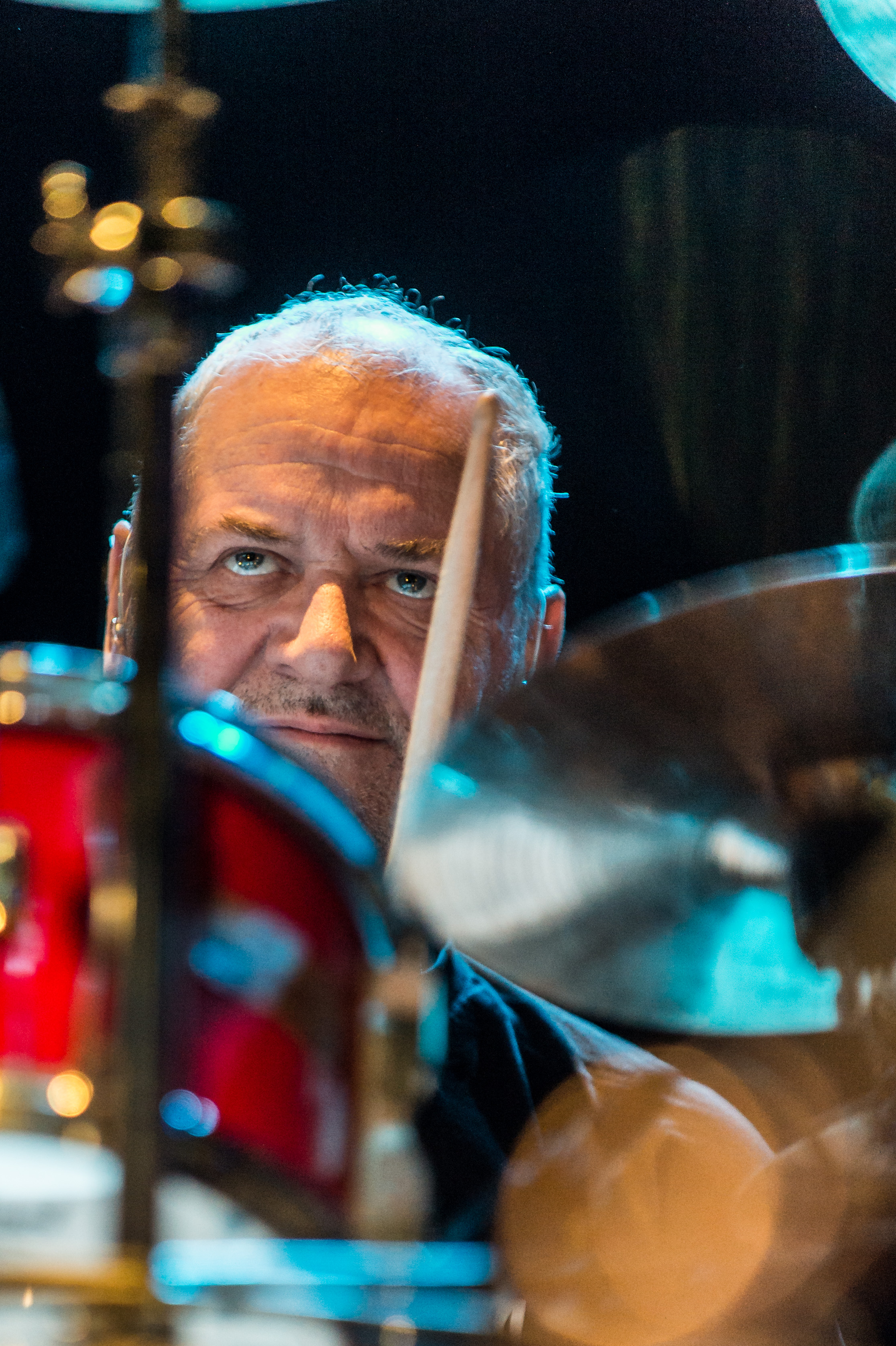
- Hiseman with Colosseum in 2015

Background information
- Born: Philip John Albert Hiseman; 21 June 1944; Woolwich, London, England
- Died: 12 June 2018 (aged 73) Sutton, England
- Genres: Blues rock; jazz fusion; progressive rock
- Occupations: Musician, songwriter, producer, recording engineer, music publisher
- Instruments: Drums, percussion
- Years active: 1965–2018
- Label: Decca
- Spouse: Barbara Thompson (m. 1967)
- Website: temple-music.com

Philip John Albert "Jon" Hiseman (21 June 1944 – 12 June 2018) was an English drummer, recording engineer, record producer, and music publisher. He played with the Graham Bond Organisation, with John Mayall & the Bluesbreakers and later formed what has been described as the "seminal" jazz rock/progressive rock band, Colosseum. He later formed Colosseum II in 1975.

He was married to saxophonist Barbara Thompson from 1967 until his death in 2018, following surgery to remove a brain tumor.

== Early life ==
Hiseman was born in Woolwich, south-east London, to Lily (née Spratt) and Philip Hiseman. His mother worked at the Bank of England and his father was a lecturer at the Camberwell School of Arts and Crafts. His family included musicians, and his mother played piano and flute.

Hiseman studied at the Addey and Stanhope School. He initially studied violin and piano, but eventually focused on the drums. In school, he played in a trio with classmates Dave Greenslade on piano and Tony Reeves on double bass.

== Career ==
In the mid-1960s, Hiseman played in sessions such as the early Arthur Brown single, "Devil's Grip". He was in a band humorously named the "Wes Minster Five", and, with Neil Ardley, helped found the New Jazz Orchestra. In 1966, he replaced Ginger Baker in the Graham Bond Organisation and also played for a brief spell with Georgie Fame and the Blue Flames. In 1964, Melody Maker magazine wrote his name as "Jon", and he decided to adopt that spelling. He then joined John Mayall & the Bluesbreakers in 1968 playing on Bare Wires. In April 1968, he left to form what has been described as the "seminal" jazz rock/progressive rock band, Colosseum. Colosseum disbanded in November 1971, although Hiseman later formed Colosseum II with Don Airey and Gary Moore in 1975.

Between these two versions of Colosseum, Hiseman formed the band Tempest with Allan Holdsworth, Paul Williams and Colosseum bandmate Mark Clarke. Ollie Halsall joined the band temporarily making the band a quintet but Holdsworth left the group along with Williams, leaving Halsall to handle all guitar and vocal duties. In the mid 1970s, Hiseman played with Dave Greenslade when he toured the album Cactus Choir. Hiseman subsequently played in jazz groups, notably with his wife, saxophonist Barbara Thompson, with whom he recorded and produced more than 15 albums. Andrew Lloyd Webber, searching for a "sound" for an album to feature his brother Julian on cello, stumbled upon Colosseum II by accident and imported the whole band into his "Variations" project. This was the start of a ten-year relationship with Hiseman, whose drumming features on recordings, TV specials and musicals.

In 1982 Hiseman built what was at the time a state-of-the-art recording studio next to his home, and together with the compositional skills of Barbara Thompson produced many recordings for film and television soundtracks. Hiseman was a founding member of the United Jazz and Rock Ensemble, a German-based "Band of Band Leaders", along with Barbara Thompson.

Colosseum reunited in June 1994 with the same line-up of musicians as when they broke up 23 years earlier. They played the Freiburg Zelt Musik Festival and followed it up with a German TV Special (WDR Cologne) in October, which was recorded and released as a CD and a VHS video; a DVD version followed in 2003. Several new studio releases also followed, as well as four expanded editions of Valentyne Suite and Colosseum Live, plus several compilation boxed sets. Barbara Thompson joined the band on various occasions before the death of Dick Heckstall-Smith in 2004 and since then was a permanent member of the band. Colosseum played its farewell concert on 28 February 2015.

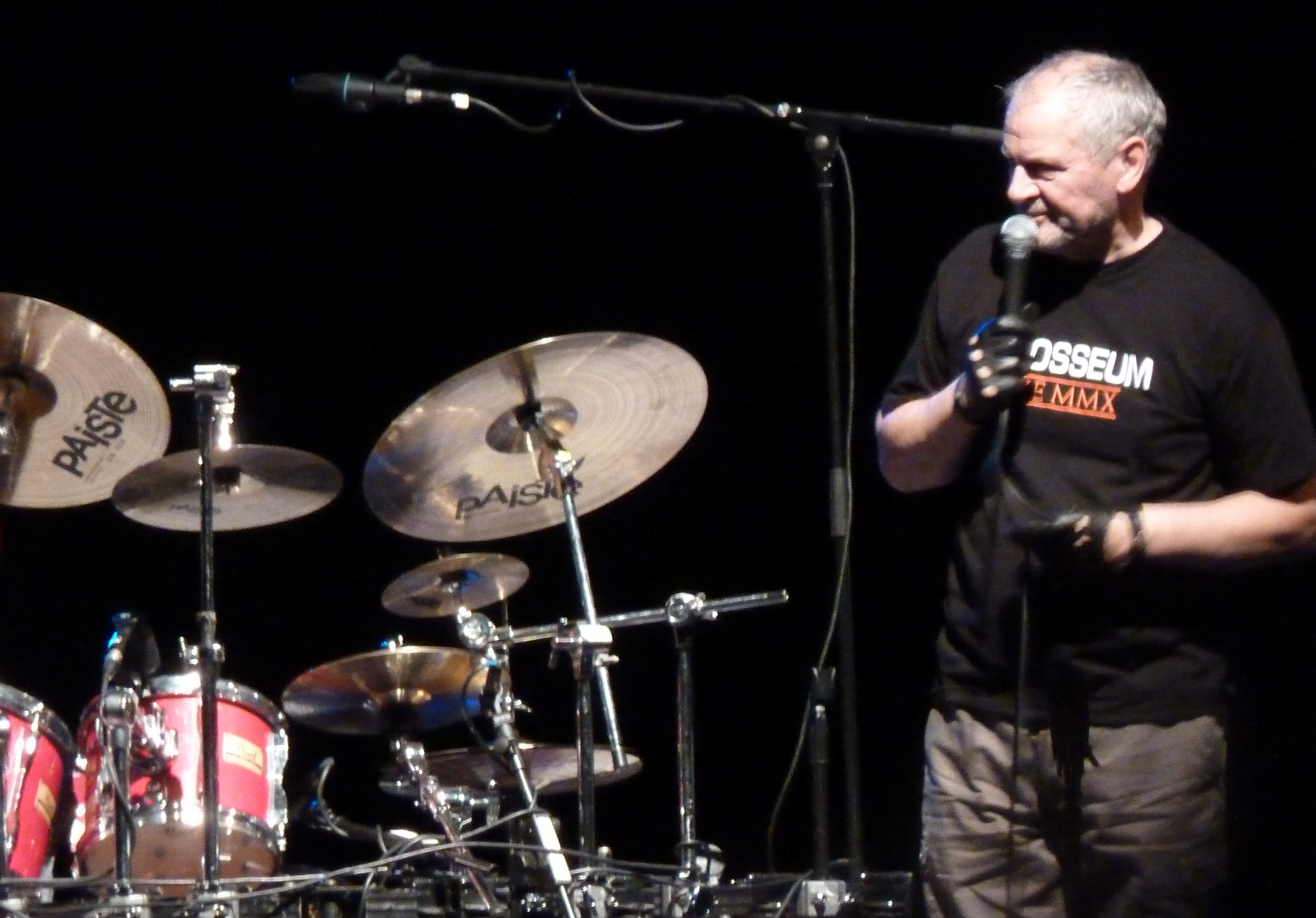
Hiseman in 2010

In October 2010 a biography of Hiseman, titled Playing the Band, was published. It was written by Martyn Hanson and edited by original Colosseum manager, Colin Richardson.

In 2017 Hiseman formed a new trio band called JCM with guitarist/vocalist Clem Clempson and bass player/vocalist Mark Clarke. The band recorded an album Heroes late in 2017 which was released in April 2018. JCM began touring on 7 April.

== Personal life and death ==
He was married to saxophonist Barbara Thompson from 1967. In May 2018 Hiseman's family reported that he was struggling with a brain tumour. He died at the age of 73 on 12 June 2018 in Sutton, London, England from a brain haemorrhage, following surgery to remove the tumour.

== Selected discography ==
- A Night in the Sun (1982)
- About Time Too! (1991)

With Jack Bruce

- Songs for a Tailor (1969)
- Things We Like (recorded 1968, released 1970)

With Colosseum

- Those Who Are About to Die Salute You (1969)
- Valentyne Suite (1969)
- The Grass Is Greener (1970)
- Daughter of Time (1970)
- Colosseum Live (1971)
- Colosseum Live – The Reunion Concerts (1994)
- Colosseum Live – Live Cologne (1994)
- The Complete Reunion Concert - Cologne (1994) (DVD)
- Bread and Circuses (1997)
- Tomorrow's Blues (2003)
- Live05 (2005)
- Time On Our Side (2014)

With Colosseum II

- Strange New Flesh (1976)
- Electric Savage (1977)
- War Dance (1977)

With JCM

- Heroes (2018)

With Tempest

- Tempest (1973)
- Living in Fear (1974)
- Under The Blossom: The Anthology (2005) [includes both albums + BBC session recordings]

Tribute

- Mike Taylor Remembered (1973), a tribute to Mike Taylor with Ian Carr, Barbara Thompson, Tony Reeves (2007)

With United Jazz + Rock Ensemble

- Live Im Schützenhaus (1977)
- Teamwork (album)|Teamwork (1978)
- The Break Even Point (1979)
- Live in Berlin (1981)
- United Live Opus Sechs (1984)
- Highlights (1984)
- Round Seven (1987)
- Na Endlich! (1992)
- Highlights II (1994)
- Die Neunte Von United (1996)
- The UJRE plays Albert Mangelsdorff (1998)
- X (1999)
- The UJRE plays Wolfgang Dauner (2002)
- The UJRE plays Volker Kriegel (2002)

With John Mayall

- Bare Wires (1968)

With Peter Lemer Quintet

- Local Colour (1968, recorded 1966)
