= Clem Clempson =

English guitarist

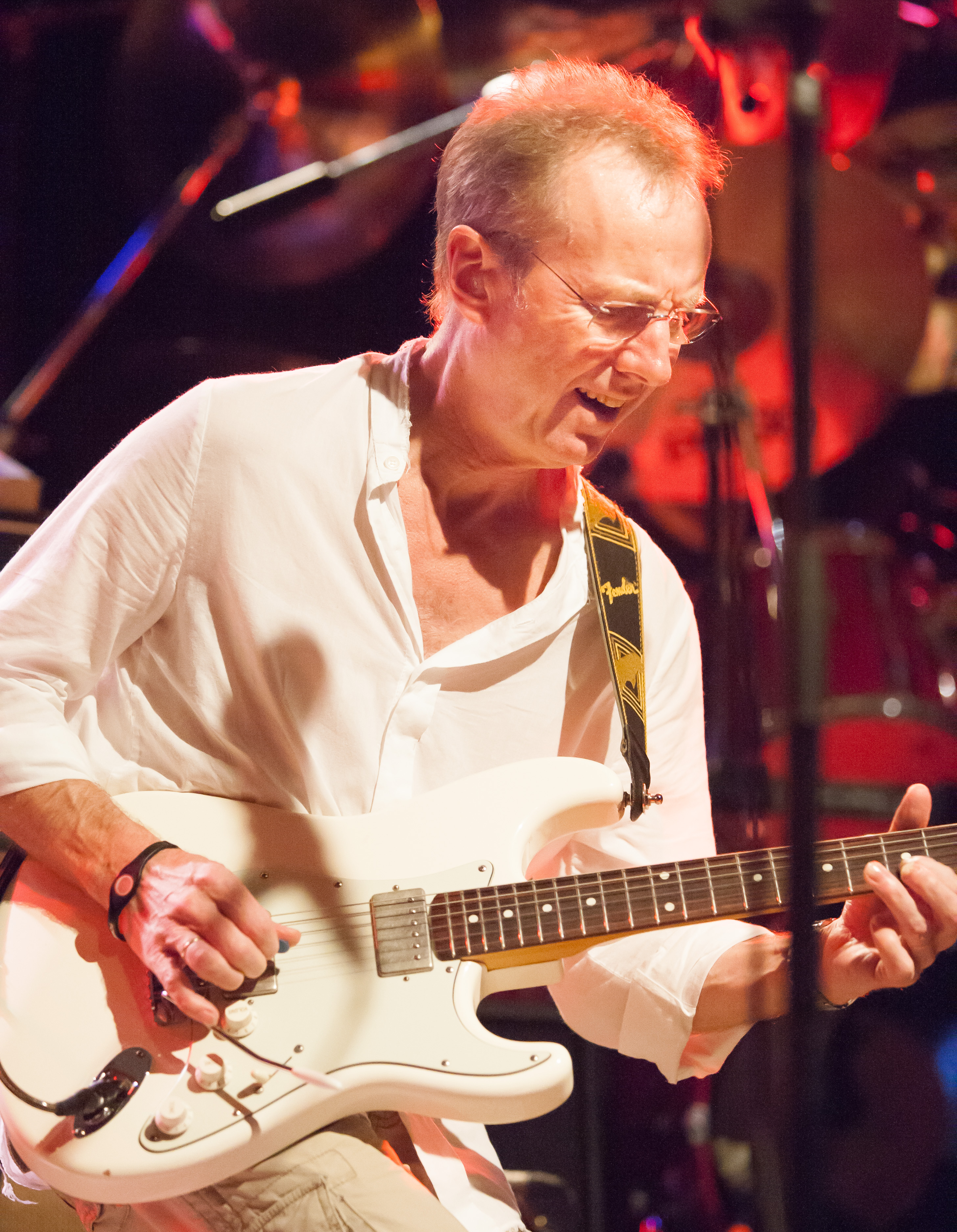
- Clempson in 2010

Background information
- Born: David Clempson; 5 September 1949 (age 77); Tamworth, Staffordshire, England
- Genres: Blues; rock; R&B; hard rock; jazz fusion; pop rock
- Occupation: Musician
- Instruments: Guitar; vocals
- Years active: 1966–present

David "Clem" Clempson (born 5 September 1949) is an English rock guitarist who has played in a number of bands, including Colosseum and Humble Pie.

Clempson has appeared as a guest musician with Jack Bruce, Billy Cobham and Dave Sancious, Roger Waters, Manfred Mann's Earth Band, Bob Dylan, Chris de Burgh, Roger Daltrey, Kiri te Kanawa and Karl Jenkins (on Kiri Sings Karl, 2006), Greenslade and Jon Anderson.

== Career ==
Clempson began his career in the late 1960s with the power trio, Bakerloo (originally The Bakerloo Blues Line), playing blues-rock. In 1969, he joined Colosseum, until they disbanded in 1971. After Colosseum's split he went on to join Humble Pie in 1971, replacing Peter Frampton. When the band split in 1975 he and Greg Ridley joined drummer Cozy Powell to form Strange Brew. During this period, Clempson auditioned for Deep Purple but lost to Tommy Bolin. Although he played in Marriott's All Stars, he opted in 1980 not to join the reformed Humble Pie, choosing instead Jack Bruce & Friends.

In 1977, Clempson formed the short lived band Rough Diamond with former Uriah Heep singer David Byron.

In 1994, Clempson re-joined Colosseum reunion version of the band, and he continued performing with the band until their farewell concert at Shepherd's Bush Empire in London on 28 February 2015.

Credits extend into scores for many films, most notably Evita (1996), G.I. Jane, Lawn Dogs, and Tomorrow Never Dies (all 1997). Clempson was also called upon by the Oscar-winning composer Trevor Jones for arrangements for the 1999 romantic comedy film Notting Hill.

From 2008 to summer 2012, he played as a member of Hamburg Blues Band.

After HBB he formed his own band, The Clem Clempson Band, which started touring at the end of February 2013 in Braunschweig, Germany. Among others the band includes Adrian Askew from Hamburg Blues Band and the band also features Chris Farlowe on vocals occasionally.

In 2017, Clempson became a member of a new trio band called JCM. Other members of the band were drummer Jon Hiseman and bass player Mark Clarke. The band recorded an album Heroes in late 2017 and it was released in April 2018. JCM began touring Europe on 7 April 2018 but the tour ended after the show on 22 April, in Bonn, due to Jon Hiseman's illness. The rest of the tour dates were cancelled.

In 2020 he was part of the reformed Colosseum alongside Mark Clarke, Chris Farlowe, Malcolm Mortimore, Adrian Askew and Kim Nishikawara.
