= Tony Reeves =

English bass guitarist

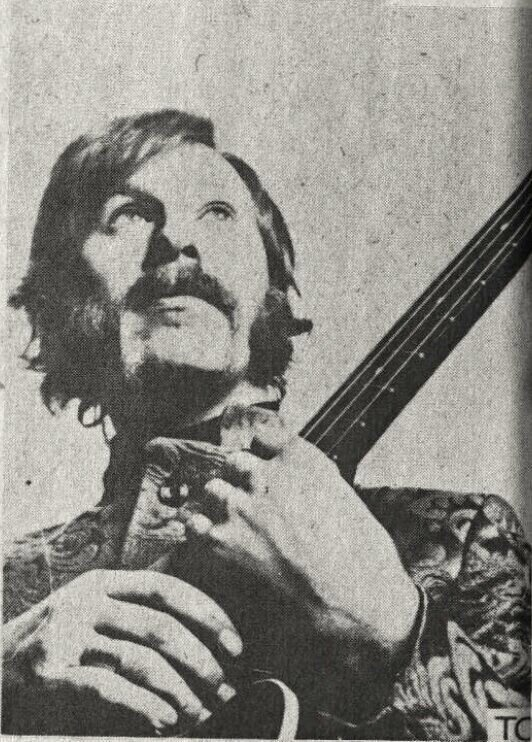
Reeves with Colosseum circa 1970

Anthony Robert Reeves (born 18 April 1943, New Eltham, South East London) is an English bass guitarist/contrabassist, noted for his "distinctive and complex bass sound" and use of electronic effects. Reeves was a co-founder of Colosseum, serving as bassist from 1968 to 1970. He also was a founding member of Greenslade, and served in most lineups of that band from 1972-2003.

== Career ==
As a teenager Reeves learned orchestral double bass and played in local jazz-oriented groups (also sometimes the Wes Minster Five) with Colfes Grammar School, Lewisham schoolmates, Dave Greenslade and Jon Hiseman; Reeves and Hiseman would later record with John Mayall on the album Bare Wires and then go on to form Colosseum.

Keen on jazz, Reeves played in the New Jazz Orchestra and had learned many standard songs. He worked in the music industry for several years, first in the quality control department of Decca Records listening to output that ranged from medieval classical music to Chubby Checker, after four years becoming assistant producer to Tony D'Amato, then briefly a record plugger for Pye Records. In late 1964 he suggested for Pye release, and played on, the instrumental UK hit Sounds Orchestral's "Cast Your Fate to the Wind". He became assistant to Tony Hatch at Pye before leaving to become a freelance producer for CBS and Polydor and creative director of the Greenwich Gramophone Company. He also recorded with the Mike Taylor Quartet on the album Pendulum in 1965 and with Davy Graham on Folk, Blues and Beyond and Midnight Man in 1966.

Shortly afterwards Reeves took up electric bass, just before Hiseman recommended him to Mayall. After two albums with Colosseum he left to concentrate on session work and production, working with the Woods Band, Sandy Denny (The North Star Grassman and the Ravens), Paul Kent, John Martyn (Bless the Weather), Day of Phoenix and Burning Red Ivanhoe from Denmark, and Chris DeBurgh. In 1972 he rejoined Dave Greenslade and formed the band Greenslade. Reeves remained with the band until 1974, recording three albums with them. As with Colosseum, his departure was motivated by a desire to focus on his career as a producer.

In 1973 he played on Mike Taylor Remembered, a tribute to the musician, with Neil Ardley, Jon Hiseman, Ian Carr, Barbara Thompson and other major modern British jazz players. Subsequently he played with Curved Air and in jazz band called Big Chief, with former Colosseum saxophonist Dick Heckstall-Smith and former Curved Air guitarist Mick Jacques. He still plays with Big Chief, Blue Amba and The Warthogs, and plays double bass at The Constitution pub in Camden Town (Davy Graham's local) every other Tuesday in the Cellar Bar, where he met multi-instrumentalist and songwriter JC Carroll, with whom he performs and records sporadically. They recorded a live album on their first show together in Ascot. They are understood to be working on an extended raga called "Looking for Gold" and an acoustic album.

Reeves is also head of the British sound technology firm MTR Professional Audio, in business for almost 30 years.
