= Dick Heckstall-Smith =

English saxophonist (1934–2004)

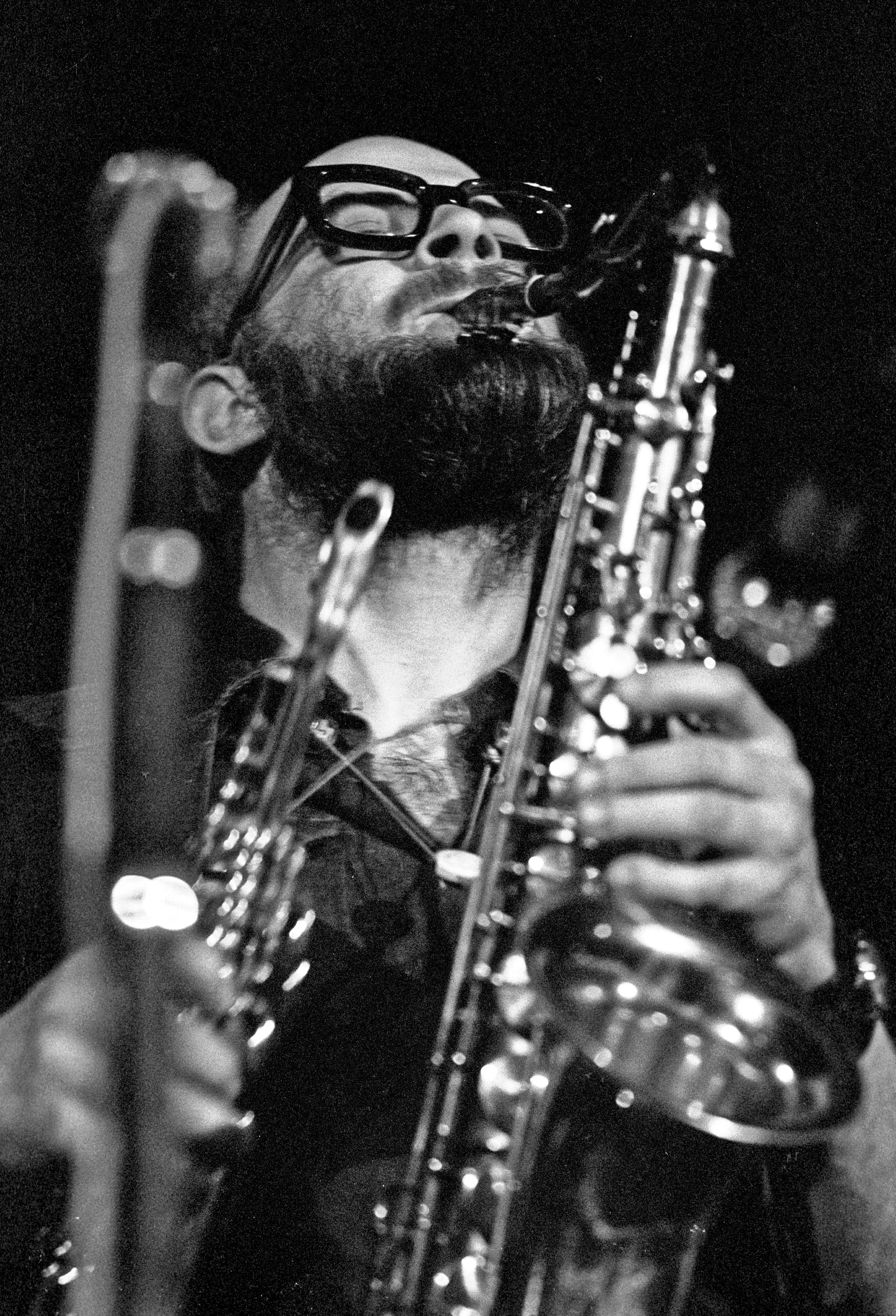
- Heckstall in 1973

Background information
- Born: Richard Malden Heckstall-Smith; 26 September 1934; Ludlow, Shropshire, England
- Died: 17 December 2004 (aged 70); Hampstead, London, England
- Education: Dartington Hall School; Sidney Sussex College, Cambridge; South Bank Polytechnic
- Genres: Blues rock; post bop; Jazz fusion; progressive rock
- Occupations: Musician
- Instruments: Saxophone
- Years active: 1962–2001
- Formerly of: Blues Incorporated; Johnny Burch Octet; The Graham Bond Organization; John Mayall Band; Colosseum

Richard Malden Heckstall-Smith (26 September 1934 – 17 December 2004) was an English jazz and blues saxophonist. He played with some of the most influential English blues rock and jazz fusion bands of the 1960s and 1970s. He is known for primarily playing tenor, soprano, and baritone saxophones, as well as piano, clarinet and alto saxophone.

== Early years ==
Heckstall-Smith was born in the Royal Free Hospital, in Ludlow, Shropshire, England, and was raised in Knighton, Radnorshire, learning to play piano, clarinet and alto saxophone in childhood. He attended a York boarding school but refused a second term there, instead enrolling in Gordonstoun, where his father Hugh Heckstall-Smith (1896-1973) had accepted a job as headmaster of the local grammar school.

Heckstall-Smith completed his education at Dartington Hall School, before reading agriculture – and co-leading the university jazz band – at Sidney Sussex College, Cambridge (1953–1956). Aged 15, he had taken up the soprano sax while at Dartington, captivated by the sound of Sidney Bechet. Subsequently, Lester Young and tenor saxophonist bebop jazzman Wardell Gray proved to be major influences for Heckstall-Smith.

His father was a Quaker, an anti-militarist, and a social reformer. Dick registered as a conscientious objector while still a school student. When he was called-up after university, he served as a hospital porter until he incurred the back injury that was to return to trouble him in the 1970s.

== Musical career ==
Heckstall-Smith was an active member of the London jazz scene from the late 1950s (including a six-month stint from December 1957 with the band led by clarinettist Sandy Brown). He joined Blues Incorporated, Alexis Korner's groundbreaking blues group, in 1962, recording the album R&B from the Marquee. The following year, he was a founding member of that band's breakaway unit, The Graham Bond Organisation. In 1967, Heckstall-Smith became a member of guitarist-vocalist John Mayall's blues rock band, Bluesbreakers. That jazz-skewed edition of the band also included drummer Jon Hiseman, bassist Tony Reeves, and future Rolling Stones guitarist Mick Taylor. They released the album Bare Wires in 1968.

From 1968 to 1971, Heckstall-Smith, Hiseman, and Reeves were members of the pioneering UK jazz-rock band Colosseum. The band afforded Heckstall-Smith an opportunity to showcase his writing and instrumental virtuosity, playing two saxophones simultaneously. During that period, he also worked with the New Jazz Orchestra and played on Jack Bruce's album Things We Like.

When Colosseum broke up in October 1971, Heckstall-Smith recorded solo albums (1972's A Story Ended featuring lyrics by Pete Brown) and fronted and played in several in the jazz fusion group Manchild.

Heckstall-Smith also played on many occasions with Big Chief, featuring on several published albums; a particularly fine example of Heckstall-Smith's work can be found on the recently found track "Use me", recorded at The Pegasus, Stoke Newington, where Big Chief had a residence for some years.

== Illness, recovery, and activities outside music ==
In March–April 1973, Heckstall-Smith suffered a severe back injury. He was unable to stand up, and was incapable of moving for three months. He told interviewer Dmitry Epstein: "I spent a long time thinking about what I'd been doing. I got really pissed-off with not having any position on politics."

Heckstall-Smith took a BSc in Social Science at South Bank Polytechnic, and acquired a library of Marxist literature on the long shelves in the corridor of his Hampstead apartment. He told Epstein, "I completely turned my back on any kind of music for about three years, I didn't touched saxophone (sic). Why, there simply wasn't time! I had too many books to read."

== Later musical career ==
Heckstall-Smith then resumed playing, with the groups Sweet Pain, Big Chief, Tough Tenors, The Famous Bluesblasters, Mainsqueeze, and DHSS. Collaborating musicians common to many of these outfits included Victor Brox, Keith Tillman and harp player John O'Leary, a founder member of Savoy Brown. In the 1980s, in his Electric Dream ensemble Heckstall-Smith also worked with the South African percussionist Julian Bahula. From 1983 to 1986, Heckstall-Smith was a member of 3-Space with John James (guitar), fellow Mainsqueeze member Dave Moore (keys), and Chris Billings (bass), with Paul Harris on keys for one tour. Apart from tenor and soprano sax, Heckstall-Smith also played baritone sax in 3-Space.

Heckstall-Smith participated in a 1994 reunion of the original Colosseum lineup and played in the hard-working Hamburg Blues Band. In 2001, he recorded the all-star project Blues and Beyond, which reunited him with Mayall, Bruce, Taylor, ex-Mayall and Fleetwood Mac guitarist Peter Green.

Described as a "witty" writer, Heckstall-Smith published his memoirs, The Safest Place in the World, in 1984; an expanded version, retitled Blowing the Blues, was published in 2004. He died aged 70 in 2004, as a result of acute liver failure.

== Discography ==
- Solid Bond with Graham Bond Organisation (Warner Bros, double album, May 1970)
- A Story Ended (Bronze, 1972)
- Woza Nasu (Aura, 1991)
- Live 1990, with John Etheridge, Rainer Glas, Joe Nay (L+R, 1991)
- Where One Is (1991)
- Celtic Steppes (Twentythree, 1995)
- This That, with Jack Bruce and John Stevens (Atonal, 1995)
- Bird in Widnes, with John Stevens (Konnex, 1995)
- Fat Guitar album by Clas Yngström (1996)
- On the Corner/Mingus in Newcastle (33 Jazz, 1998)
- Celtic Steppes (33 Jazz)
- Obsession Fees, with John Etheridge group (R&M (Germany), 1998)
- Blues and Beyond (2001)

== Bibliography ==
- The Safest Place in the World: A Personal History of British Rhythm and Blues (Quartet, 1984, ISBN 978-0704326965)
- Blowing the Blues: Fifty Years Playing the British Blues, with Pete Grant (Clear Books, 2004, ISBN 978-1904555049)
