= Mark-Almond =

English pop group

- Genres: Rock, folk rock, jazz
- Years active: 1970–1981
- Labels: Blue Thumb, Columbia, ABC Records
- Members: Jon Mark; Johnny Almond

Mark–Almond was a jazz-influenced English pop group of the 1970s and early 1980s, sometimes also called The Mark-Almond Band. The core members were Jon Mark, who sang lead and played guitar, percussion, and harmonica, and Johnny Almond, who played saxophone, flute and bass flute and sang back-up. Various other musicians recorded and toured with the duo at various times, notably including drummer Dannie Richmond, a longtime associate of jazz bassist Charles Mingus.

== Early history ==
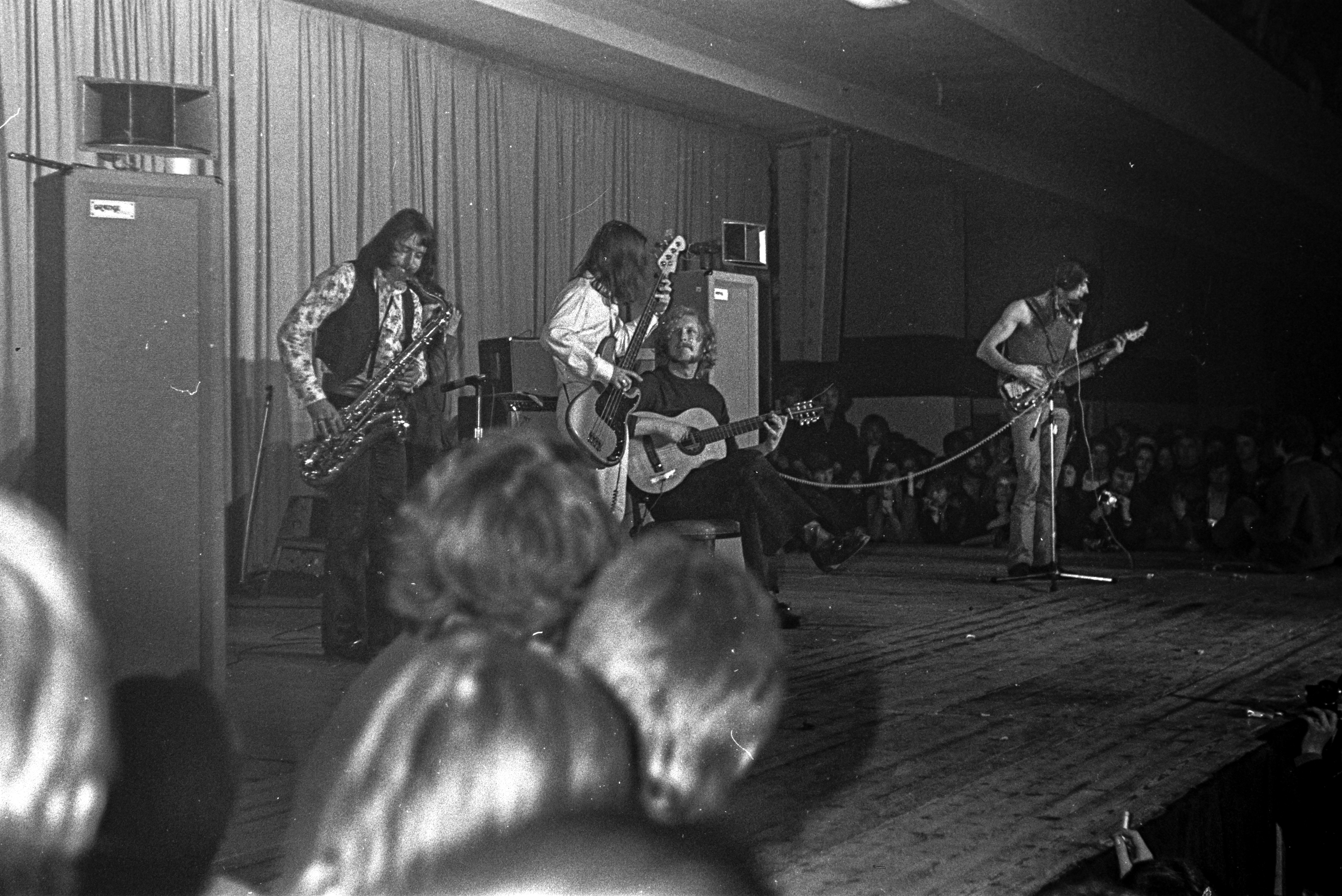
Jon Mark on acoustic guitar, Johnny Almond on saxophone, John Mayall on a Fender Telecaster guitar, Steve Thompson on bass, January 12, 1970 Niedersachsenhalle, Hannover

In 1963, Jon Mark, using his given name John Michael Burchell, and a former schoolmate, Alun Davies, singer-songwriter, folk guitarist and skiffle musician (later of Cat Stevens' band), recorded as a duo an album entitled Relax Your Mind, on Decca Records.

From 1965 on, Mark accompanied Marianne Faithfull on her recordings and concerts. He also wrote and arranged many tracks on her first three albums (Marianne Faithfull, Come My Way and North Country Maid) and wrote a few songs for her ("Come My Way", "Lullaby").

In 1968 Mark and Davies founded the short-lived band Sweet Thursday. The five-piece band had only one recording, the eponymous Sweet Thursday, on Fontana Records. The band comprised Jon Mark, Alun Davies, Nicky Hopkins, Harvey Burns, and Brian Odgers. Their album was not promoted by their record label, and the group never toured.

Johnny Almond, born John Albert Almond on 20 July 1946 in Enfield, Middlesex, previously played in Zoot Money's Big Roll Band and the Alan Price Set, as well as performing considerable session work in England.

In 1969 he had founded Johnny Almond's Music Machine and had recorded two solo records: Patent Pending and Hollywood Blues. On Patent Pending Almond is accompanied by Geoff Condon, Jimmy Crawford, Steve Hammond, Roger Sutton and Johnny Wiggins. Session musicians forHollywood Blues include Curtis Amy, Hadley Caliman, Joe Harris, Charles Kynard, Ray Neapolitan, Joe Pass, Earl Palmer and Vi Redd.

Almond and Mark began playing together on John Mayall's post-Bluesbreakers records, The Turning Point (1969) and Empty Rooms (1969). From that experience they decided to form Mark-Almond.

== Mark-Almond ==
Mark-Almond's first two albums, Mark-Almond (1970) and Mark-Almond II (1971), were recorded for Bob Krasnow's Blue Thumb label, and were noted for their embossed envelope-style album covers. The first album, including "The Ghetto", received many plaudits. It also contained "The City", which, at 10 minutes, 32 seconds, is notable for its range of styles and musical expertise.

The band's second album contained the Boston regional hit song "One Way Sunday", which garnered airplay for them in the United States on album-oriented rock stations in Boston, Massachusetts on the WBCN FM AOR radio station, and in Baltimore, MD at WAYE, according to Program Director Ty Ford. The single reached #94 on the Billboard Hot 100 chart. The group then recorded two albums for Columbia Records, Rising (1972) and the live album Mark-Almond 73 (1973), by which time the group's members had grown to seven.

In October 1972, Mark was involved in an accident in Hawaii and lost most of his left-hand ring finger. Speaking on the incident, Mark was quoted later in Melody Maker as saying he "climbed like a native and fell like an Englishman". "What Am I Living For" from Mark-Almond 73 gained the group the most U.S. radio airplay they would get, but nevertheless they disbanded later that year.

Mark released a solo record for Columbia, Song for a Friend, in 1975. He and Almond reunited in 1975 and released To the Heart on ABC Records (which had acquired Blue Thumb) in 1976, which featured the drummer Billy Cobham. Other notable musicians who have recorded or toured with Mark-Almond include drummer Dannie Richmond, violinist Greg Bloch, keyboardist Tommy Eyre and bassist Roger Sutton. Eyre and Sutton later teamed in Riff Raff. A&M Records signed the duo in 1978 and released Other Peoples Rooms (which contained a rerecorded version of "The City"), but the record did not sell as well as earlier releases. Mark-Almond disbanded again in the mid 1980s, after releasing two albums, Tuesday in New York' (1980) and a live offering The Last & Live (1981). In 1996 Mark-Almond reunited again for a CD release, Night Music, which featured keyboardist Mike Nock and others.

== Late history ==
Mark moved to New Zealand in the mid 1980s, and released a number of successful solo ambient music recordings on his White Cloud record label, as well as collaborating with other artists on traditional Celtic and folk recordings and producing other artists. A release of Tibetan monk chants Mark recorded and produced with his wife Thelma Burchell won a Grammy Award in 2004.

Almond lived in the San Francisco Bay Area. He died on 18 November 2009 from cancer, aged 63. He occasionally surprised local bar owners, arriving with his sax to jam, some of which was recorded, including a rousing rendition of "Stormy Monday".

== Discography ==
- 1970: Mark-Almond (Blue Thumb BTS-27; CD reissue: Line LICD 9.00105; latest CD reissue: Varese Sarabande [UPC: 030206730289]) (Billboard 200 #154)
- 1971: Mark-Almond II (Blue Thumb BTS-32; CD reissue: Line LICD 9.00517) (BB #87)
- 1972: Rising (Columbia KC-31917; CD reissue: Line LICD 9.00511) (BB #103)
- 1973: Mark-Almond 73 (Columbia KC-32486; CD reissue: Line LICD 9.00514) (BB #73)
- 1973: The Best Of Mark-Almond (Blue Thumb BTS-50) – compilation (BB #177)
- 1976: To The Heart (ABC AB-945; CD reissue: One Way 22084) (BB #112)
- 1978: Other Peoples Rooms (Horizon/A&M SP-730; CD reissue: Universal/A&M [Japan]; latest CD reissue: Elemental Music [UPC: 8435395500897]) – AUS No. 72
- 1980: Tuesday in New York (Line 6.24242; CD reissue: Line LICD 9.00056)
- 1981: The Last & Live (Line 6.28538 [2LP]; CD reissue: Line LICD 9.00415)
- 1981: Best Of...Live (Pacific Arts PAC7-142) – compilation
- 1991: The Best Of (Rhino MIC 53872) – compilation
- 1996: Nightmusic (White Cloud 11026 [UPC: 747313002627])

== Band members ==
- Johnny Almond
- Bill Berg
- Gregory Bloch
- Billy Cobham
- Geoff Condon
- Ken Craddock
- Mark Cranny
- Alun Davies
- Tommy Eyre
- Steve Gadd
- Colin Gibson
- Jerry Hey
- Larry Knechtel
- Will Lee
- John Leftwich
- Jay Lewis
- Ralph MacDonald
- Jon Mark
- Dave Marotta
- Jeannie McLaine
- Wolfgang Melz
- Roberto Pattacia
- Leon Pendarvis
- Dannie Richmond
- Carlos Rios
- Mark Ross
- Jim Salargie
- Roger Sutton
- Tommy Tedesco
- Bobby Torres
- John Tropea
- Bobby Vega
- Larry Williams
