= USA Union =

Studio album by John Mayall
- Released: October 1970
- Studio: Larrabee Studio, Los Angeles, United States
- Genre: Blues
- Length: 47:44
- Label: Polydor
- Producer: John Mayall

John Mayall chronology
Empty Rooms (1970)	USA Union (1970)	Back to the Roots (1971)

Professional ratings
Review scores
Source	Rating
Rolling Stone	(mixed)
Allmusic	2/5 stars

USA Union is a 1970 album by blues musician John Mayall, featuring Harvey Mandel on guitar, Larry Taylor on bass and Don "Sugarcane" Harris on violin. The album was recorded on July 27 & 28th, 1970 at Larrabee Studios in LA and released by Polydor later in the same year.

At the end of the sixties John Mayall was residing in Laurel Canyon, Los Angeles, California and had developed connections with local musicians, befriending Harvey Mandel and Larry Taylor, who had both just departed Canned Heat. Taylor had appeared on one track of Mayall's previous album, Empty Rooms, the only studio recordings of his "Turning Point" band, and stayed on to replace Stephen Thompson (with whom he duetted on "To a Princess"); Mandel essentially replaced acoustic guitar specialist Jon Mark, and electric violinist Harris replaced saxophonist Johnny Almond. In the USA Union liner notes, Mayall noted that, after the Turning Point band broke up, he'd played a British music festival with an all-star lineup and then needed to form a new band swiftly when Polydor Records pressed him for a new album.

With his new all-American line up, Mayall pursued the jazzy blues experiment documented on his live album The Turning Point. This unusual format (electric guitars by Mayall and Mandel, Mayall playing piano and harmonica as well, Harris's electric violin, Taylor's acoustic and electric bass, and no drums) the band created a unique sound and recorded this series of songs mostly chronicling Mayall's then-romance with Nancy Throckmorton (a theme he first visited on Empty Rooms), who provided some photography for the album jacket. "Nature's Disappearing," the album's opening song, dealt with environmental issues, the only song on the album that didn't address Mayall's romance. On tour the band was joined by drummer Paul Lagos from Kaleidoscope. Jazz critic Leonard Feather wrote liner notes for the back of the album; inside the gatefold jacket, Mayall gave advice on preserving nature.

The USA Union lineup would appear as some of the core of Mayall's Back to the Roots set, which featured several notable Mayall alumni including Eric Clapton, John McVie, Mick Taylor, Stephen Thompson and previous drummers Keef Hartley and Aynsley Dunbar. Mayall would keep the drumless format for just one more album, Memories, where Jerry McGee replaced Harvey Mandel as guitarist.

== Track listing ==
All compositions by John Mayall

1. "Nature's Disappearing" – 5:58
2. "You Must Be Crazy" – 3:58
3. "Night Flyer" – 5:36
4. "Off the Road" – 2:51
5. "Possessive Emotions" – 5:22
6. "Where Did My Legs Go" – 3:48
7. "Took the Car" – 4:11
8. "Crying" – 6:30
9. "My Pretty Girl" – 4:24
10. "Deep Blue Sea" – 5:06

"Nature's Disappearing" reappeared in a new version on the album Wake up Call (1993); it can be heard as played in concert on the album Live from Austin, TX (2007; recorded September 1993).

On Polydor LP STEREO 2425 020 the tracks "You Must Be Crazy" and "Took the Car" have changed places, though the cover lists the tracks as above.

== Personnel ==
- Don "Sugarcane" Harris – violin
- Harvey Mandel – guitar
- John Mayall – guitar, harmonica, keyboards, vocals
- Larry Taylor – bass guitar

=== Production ===
- Leonard Feather – liner notes
- Charles Fulcher – composer
- Bob Gordon – photography
- John Judnich – engineer
- Tapani Tapanainen – photography
- Nancy Throckmorton – photography
