= Go Away from My World =

Studio album by Marianne Faithfull
- Released: December 1965
- Recorded: 1965
- Genre: Folk rock
- Label: London
- Producer: Mike Leander

Marianne Faithfull chronology
Marianne Faithfull (1965)	Go Away from My World (1965)	North Country Maid (1966)

Go Away from My World is the second American studio album by British singer Marianne Faithfull. Andrew Loog Oldham was the executive producer with David Bailey and Gered Mankowitz credited for the photography.

Though the song "Come My Way" had been the title track of her second British album, the version on that album was from a different session and a considerably different performance than that included here.

== Track listing ==
1. "Go Away from My World" (Jon Mark)
2. "Yesterday" (John Lennon, Paul McCartney)
3. "Come My Way" (Traditional)
4. "The Last Thing on My Mind" (Tom Paxton)
5. "How Should I Your True Love Know" (Alfred Deller)
6. "Wild Mountain Thyme" (Francis McPeake)
7. "Summer Nights" (Brian Henderson, Liza Strike)
8. "Mary Ann" (Traditional)
9. "Scarborough Fair" (Traditional)
10. "Lullabye" (Jon Mark)
11. "North Country Maid" (Traditional)
12. "Sally Free and Easy" (Cyril Tawney)

== Charts ==
Chart (1965)	Peak position
US Billboard 200	81
US Cash Box Top 100 Albums	40
