= Rząb =

Rząb (Polish pronunciation: [ˈʐɔmp]) or Rzab is a surname of Polish-language origin. It may refer to:

- Władysław Rząb (1910–1992), Polish painter
- Greg Rzab (born 1959), American musician
