= Sweet Thursday =

Sweet Thursday may refer to:

- Sweet Thursday (novel), a 1954 novel by John Steinbeck
- Sweet Thursday (band), a late-1960s English rock band
- Sweet Thursday (album), a 1960 album by Sweet Thursday
- "Sweet Thursday" (song), a 1961 single by Johnny Mathis
