= Nobody Told Me (album) =

Studio album by John Mayall
- Released: 22 February 2019
- Studio: 606 Studios
- Genre: Blues rock
- Length: 48:05
- Label: Forty Below
- Producer: Eric Corne, John Mayall

John Mayall chronology
Talk About That (2017)	Nobody Told Me (2019)	The Sun Is Shining Down (2022)

Nobody Told Me is a studio album by British blues musician John Mayall. It was released on 22 February 2019 through Forty Below Records.

On this album, different musicians play lead guitar on different songs. These guests include Todd Rundgren, Steven Van Zandt, Alex Lifeson, Joe Bonamassa, Larry McCray and Carolyn Wonderland.

Nobody Told Me was recorded from 23 January to 1 February 2018. At the time, Mayall was 84 years old.

== Critical reception ==
Professional ratings
Aggregate scores
Source	Rating
Metacritic	73/100
Review scores
Source	Rating
AllMusic	3.5/5 stars

On AllMusic, Thom Jurek said, "Mayall has a way of both purposing his guitarists and focusing them while getting them to open up.... Guitar slayers notwithstanding, Nobody Told Me is a hallmark Mayall date, chock-full of great songs and performances that underscore his considerable (and well-deserved) reputation."

In Glide Magazine, Steve Ovadia wrote, "Bluesman John Mayall is perhaps best known for his ear for talent.... But Mayall is more than just a great hiring manager. He's also a talented singer and harmonica/keyboard player. Nobody Told Me, his latest album, leaves little doubt that the 85-year-old Englishman still has plenty of blues left in his tank."

In Blues Blast Magazine, John Mitchell wrote, "Those who missed the guitar element of John’s music last time around will love this one. There are several standout performances and Carolyn Wonderland's excellent contributions bode well for the next chapter of John Mayall's amazing career."

In Blues Rock Review, Meghan Roos said, ""Fifty-three years after releasing his first album with the Bluesbreakers, John Mayall is back with his latest studio album Nobody Told Me, a 10-track collection released in late February that sounds as fresh and energetic as any of the albums he's recorded in the last half-century.

== Track listing ==
Nobody Told Me track listing
No.	Title	Writer(s)	Length
1.	"What Have I Done Wrong" (featuring Joe Bonamassa)	Sam Meghett	3:55
2.	"The Moon Is Full" (featuring Larry McCray)	Gwendolyn Collins	4:54
3.	"Evil and Here to Stay" (featuring Alex Lifeson)	Jeff Healey, Tom Stephen	4:48
4.	"That's What Love Will Make You Do" (featuring Todd Rundgren)	Milton Campbell	3:54
5.	"Distant Lonesome Train" (featuring Carolyn Wonderland)	Joe Bonamassa, Tom Hambridge	4:33
6.	"Delta Hurricane" (featuring Joe Bonamassa)	Arno Hecht, Bob Funk	4:58
7.	"The Hurt Inside" (featuring Larry McCray)	Gary Moore	5:36
8.	"It's So Tough" (featuring Steven Van Zandt)	John Mayall	4:19
9.	"Like It Like You Do" (featuring Carolyn Wonderland)	John Mayall	3:46
10.	"Nobody Told Me" (featuring Carolyn Wonderland)	John Mayall	7:22
Total length:			48:05

== Personnel ==
Musicians

- John Mayall – vocals, keyboards, harmonica
- Greg Rzab – bass guitar
- Jay Davenport – drums
- Ron Dziubla – saxophone
- Mark Pender – trumpet
- Richard A Rosenberg – trombone
- Billy Watts – rhythm guitar

Production

- Produced by Eric Corne and John Mayall
- Engineering, mixing: Eric Corne
- Mastering: Mark Chalecki, Eric Corne
- Recording engineers: John Lousteau, Rene Marino
- Design, artwork: John Mayall
- Photography: David Gomez, Christina Arrigoni

== Charts ==
Chart performance for Nobody Told Me
Chart (2019)	Peak position
Austrian Albums (Ö3 Austria)	68
Belgian Albums (Ultratop Flanders)	69
Belgian Albums (Ultratop Wallonia)	76
Dutch Albums (Album Top 100)	88
French Albums (SNEP)	195
French Jazz Albums (SNEP)	1
German Albums (Offizielle Top 100)	28
Scottish Albums (OCC)	23
Swiss Albums (Schweizer Hitparade)	16
UK Independent Albums (OCC)	9
UK Jazz & Blues Albums (OCC)	1
US Independent Albums (Billboard)	24
US Top Blues Albums (Billboard)	2
