= Talk About That =

Studio album by John Mayall
- Released: 27 January 2017
- Genre: Blues rock
- Length: 47:23
- Label: Forty Below
- Producer: John Mayall; Eric Corne

John Mayall chronology
Find a Way to Care (2015)	Talk About That (2017)	Nobody Told Me (2019)

Talk About That is a studio album by British blues musician John Mayall, released on 27 January 2017 through Forty Below Records. It was produced by Mayall and Eric Corne and received positive reviews from critics.

== Critical reception ==
Professional ratings
Aggregate scores
Source	Rating
Metacritic	70/100
Review scores
Source	Rating
Classic Rock	4/5 stars
Mojo	3/5 stars
PopMatters	7/10
Uncut	7/10

Talk About That received a score of 70 out of 100 on review aggregator Metacritic based on four critics' reviews, indicating "generally favorable" reception. Uncut wrote that "Mayall proves that playing the blues is seemingly impervious to age", while Mojo commented that "Mayall and his ace band revive songs by Bettye Crutcher, Jimmy Rogers and Jerry Lynn Williams alongside piquant original material". Henry Yates of Classic Rock found that it is "lifted above late-period fodder by a horn section that razzes up 'Gimme Some of That Gumbo'" and remarked that it is "ridiculous for an 83-year old to sound this relevant". A staff review from PopMatters stated that Talk About That "finds him in fine form and spirits as he offers up a series of soul-slathered tunes that reveal a lifetime of grit and sweat", calling it "proof positive that Mayall maintains his standing in the pantheon of great bluesmen whose sense of soul and purpose is indefatigable".

== Track listing ==
All tracks written by John Mayall, except where indicated.

Talk About That track listing
No.	Title	Writer(s)	Length
1.	"Talk About That"		4:25
2.	"It's Hard Going Up"	Bettye Crutcher	4:14
3.	"The Devil Must Be Laughing" (featuring Joe Walsh)		6:57
4.	"Gimme Some of That Gumbo"		3:56
5.	"Goin' Away Baby"	James A. Lane	3:50
6.	"Cards on the Table"		4:16
7.	"I Didn't Mean to Hurt You"		4:25
8.	"Don't Deny Me"	Jerry Lynn Williams	4:29
9.	"Blue Midnight"		4:02
10.	"Across the County Line"	Rocky Athas; Jay Davenport; John Mayall; Greg Rzab	3:18
11.	"You Never Know"		3:31
Total length:			47:23

== Charts ==
Chart performance for Talk About That
Chart (2017)	Peak position
Belgian Albums (Ultratop Flanders)	74
Belgian Albums (Ultratop Wallonia)	166
Dutch Albums (Album Top 100)	130
Swiss Albums (Schweizer Hitparade)	84
UK Independent Albums (OCC)	37
