= Find a Way to Care =

Studio album by John Mayall
- Released: 4 September 2015
- Genre: Blues rock
- Length: 46:30
- Label: Forty Below
- Producer: John Mayall; Eric Corne

John Mayall chronology
A Special Life (2014)	Find a Way to Care (2015)	Talk About That (2017)

Find a Way to Care is a studio album by British blues musician John Mayall, released on 4 September 2015 through Forty Below Records. It was produced by Mayall and Eric Corne and received positive reviews from critics.

== Critical reception ==
Professional ratings
Aggregate scores
Source	Rating
Metacritic	70/100
Review scores
Source	Rating
AllMusic	3.5/5 stars
Classic Rock	3.5/5 stars
Mojo	3/5 stars
Record Collector	4/5 stars
Uncut	7/10

Find a Way to Care received a score of 70 out of 100 on review aggregator Metacritic based on five critics' reviews, indicating "generally favorable" reception. Uncut found there to be "no surprises" and wrote that it is "no classic, but a warm and well-produced set", while Mojo commented that "there's a synergy and rapport in the set's dozen tracks that reveals how deeply the new band has gelled with Mayall". Record Collector's Michael Heatley described it as "another excellent studio album of all-new material" that "the addition of a horn section" to "gives this album a different feel to its rootsier predecessor, while Mayall himself features more prominently on keyboards – a feature of the live shows".

David West of Classic Rock called Mayall's voice "a little rougher, a little thinner" but "crucially, Mayall still knows how to sell a song and he's backed by his regular band – guitarist Rocky Athas, bassist Greg Rzab and drummer Jay Davenport – who understand where to push forwards to fill the gaps and when to sit back". AllMusic's Thom Jurek opined that it is "a Mayall album that—uncharacteristically—focuses on his keyboard skills" and one that demonstrates that his "voice is beginning to show its age (on the slow tunes in particular), but he can still sing and shout clearly. Find a Way to Care doesn't break new ground, but it is exploratory."

== Track listing ==
Find a Way to Care track listing
No.	Title	Writer(s)	Length
1.	"Mother in Law Blues"	Don Robey	3:12
2.	"The River's Invitation"	Percy Mayfield	3:47
3.	"Ain't No Guarantees"	John Mayall	3:23
4.	"I Feel So Bad"	Sam Hopkins	4:19
5.	"Find a Way to Care"	Mayall	3:42
6.	"Long Distance Call"	McKinley Morganfield	4:30
7.	"I Want All My Money Back"	Lee Baker Jr.	3:20
8.	"Ropes and Chains"	Mayall; Greg Rzab	4:17
9.	"Long Summer Days"	Mayall	3:52
10.	"Drifting Blues"	Charles Brown; Eddie Williams; Johnny Moore	4:21
11.	"War We Wage"	Matt Schofield; Dorothy Whittick	4:14
12.	"Crazy Lady"	Mayall	3:33
Total length:			46:30

== Charts ==
Chart performance for Find a Way to Care
Chart (2015)	Peak position
Belgian Albums (Ultratop Flanders)	82
Belgian Albums (Ultratop Wallonia)	125
Dutch Albums (Album Top 100)	41
Swiss Albums (Schweizer Hitparade)	86
UK Independent Albums (OCC)	31
