= North Country Maid =

Studio album by Marianne Faithfull
- Released: 1 April 1966
- Genre: Folk rock
- Length: 34:51
- Label: Decca
- Producer: Mike Leander

Marianne Faithfull chronology
Go Away from My World (1965)	North Country Maid (1966)	Faithfull Forever (1966)

North Country Maid is the third studio album by British singer Marianne Faithfull. It was released only in the United Kingdom. The arrangements were by Jon Mark and Mick Taylor. Gus Dudgeon was the engineer and Gered Mankowitz was the photographer. The guitarists included Jon Mark and Big Jim Sullivan.

Half of the songs had been released months earlier in the United States on the album Go Away from My World.

== Track listing ==
1. "Green Are Your Eyes" (Bert Jansch)
2. "Scarborough Fair" (Traditional; arranged by Jon Mark)
3. "Cockleshells" (arranged by Mick Taylor)
4. "The Last Thing on My Mind" (Tom Paxton)
5. "The First Time Ever I Saw Your Face" (Ewan MacColl)
6. "Sally Free and Easy" (Cyril Tawney; arranged by Jon Mark)
7. "Sunny Goodge Street" (Donovan)
8. "How Should I Your True Love Know" (Traditional; arranged by Jon Mark)
9. "She Moved Thru' The Fair" (Traditional; adapted by Herbert Hughes, words by Padraic Colum)
10. "North Country Maid" (Traditional; arranged by Jon Mark)
11. "Lullaby" (Jon Mark)
12. "Wild Mountain Thyme" (Francis McPeake; arranged by Jon Mark)

Bonus tracks on 1990 CD re-issue:

1. "The Most of What Is Least" (Donovan)
2. "Come My Way" (Traditional) (alternate version from original on Come My Way)
3. "Mary Ann" (Traditional; arranged by Jon Mark) (alternate version from original on Come My Way)
