= A Special Life =

Studio album by John Mayall
- Released: 30 May 2014
- Recorded: November 2013
- Genre: Blues rock
- Length: 48:38
- Label: Forty Below
- Producer: John Mayall, Eric Corne

John Mayall chronology
Tough (2009)	A Special Life (2014)	Find a Way to Care (2015)

Professional ratings
Review scores
Source	Rating
AllMusic	3.5/5 stars

A Special Life is a studio album by British blues musician John Mayall. It was released on 30 May 2014 by Forty Below Records, and it is his first studio album since 2009's Tough.

== Track listing ==
A Special Life track listing
No.	Title	Writer(s)	Length
1.	"Why Did You Go Last Night"	Clifton Chenier	4:50
2.	"Speak of the Devil"	Sonny Landreth	3:20
3.	"That's All Right"	James Lane	3:40
4.	"World Gone Crazy"	John Mayall	4:10
5.	"Floodin' in California"	Albert King	4:32
6.	"Big Town Playboy"	Eddie Taylor	4:15
7.	"A Special Life"	Mayall	4:06
8.	"I Just Got to Know"	Jimmy McCracklin	4:04
9.	"Heartache"	Mayall	4:42
10.	"Like a Fool"	Greg Rzab, Rocky Athas	4:00
11.	"Just a Memory"	Mayall	6:38

== Personnel ==
- John Mayall – vocals, guitars, harmonica, organ, piano
- Rocky Athas – guitars
- Greg Rzab – bass guitar, percussions
- Jay Davenport – drums
- C. J. Chenier – accordion, vocals
