= The Sun Is Shining Down =

Studio album by John Mayall
- Released: 28 January 2022
- Genre: Blues rock
- Length: 45:43
- Label: Forty Below
- Producer: John Mayall; Eric Corne

John Mayall chronology
Nobody Told Me (2019)	The Sun Is Shining Down (2022)

The Sun Is Shining Down is the final studio album by British blues musician John Mayall, released on 28 January 2022 through Forty Below Records. All but one of the tracks are collaborations with other musicians, including two collaborations with both Melvin Taylor and Scarlet Rivera. It was produced by Mayall and Eric Corne and received positive reviews from critics.

== Critical reception ==
Professional ratings
Aggregate scores
Source	Rating
Metacritic	78/100
Review scores
Source	Rating
AllMusic	4/5 stars
American Songwriter	3.5/5 stars
Classic Rock	4/5 stars
Uncut	7/10

The Sun Is Shining Down received a score of 78 out of 100 on review aggregator Metacritic based on four critics' reviews, indicating "generally favorable" reception. Classic Rock found that "Mayall endures, and keeps exploring, with his best originals – 'Got to Find a Better Way' and 'Deep Blue Sea' – bent happily out of shape by screeching violin", while Uncut commented that "Mayall enthusiastically opens the door to funk and soul elements". Hal Horowitz of American Songwriter stated that while "Mayall never had a commanding voice and his thin vocals aren't getting any sturdier with age", he still "delivers these songs with emotion and joy that belies the many candles on his birthday cake". Thom Jurek of AllMusic opined that Mayall's "ability to write and record vital modern blues with excellent musicians continues unabated" as he "sounds hungry and vital. Mayall delivers these rough-and-ready blues like a champ."

== Track listing ==
All tracks written by John Mayall, except where indicated.

The Sun Is Shining Down track listing
No.	Title	Writer(s)	Length
1.	"Hungry and Ready" (featuring Melvin Taylor)		5:00
2.	"Can't Take No More" (featuring Marcus King)		3:45
3.	"I'm as Good as Gone" (featuring Buddy Miller)	Bobby Rush	4:23
4.	"Got to Find a Better Way" (featuring Scarlet Rivera)		5:00
5.	"Chills and Thrills" (featuring Mike Campbell)	Bernard Allison	5:20
6.	"One Special Lady" (featuring Jake Shimabukuro)		4:17
7.	"A Quitter Never Wins"	Tinsley Ellis; Margaret Sampson	4:33
8.	"Deep Blue Sea" (featuring Scarlet Rivera)		4:25
9.	"Driving Wheel" (featuring Melvin Taylor)	Roosevelt Sykes	3:41
10.	"The Sun Is Shining Down" (featuring Carolyn Wonderland)		5:19
Total length:			45:43

== Charts ==
Chart performance for The Sun Is Shining Down
Chart (2022)	Peak position
Belgian Albums (Ultratop Flanders)	159
German Albums (Offizielle Top 100)	87
Scottish Albums (OCC)	75
Swiss Albums (Schweizer Hitparade)	29
UK Independent Albums (OCC)	28
