= Johnny Almond =

British saxophonist (1946–2009)

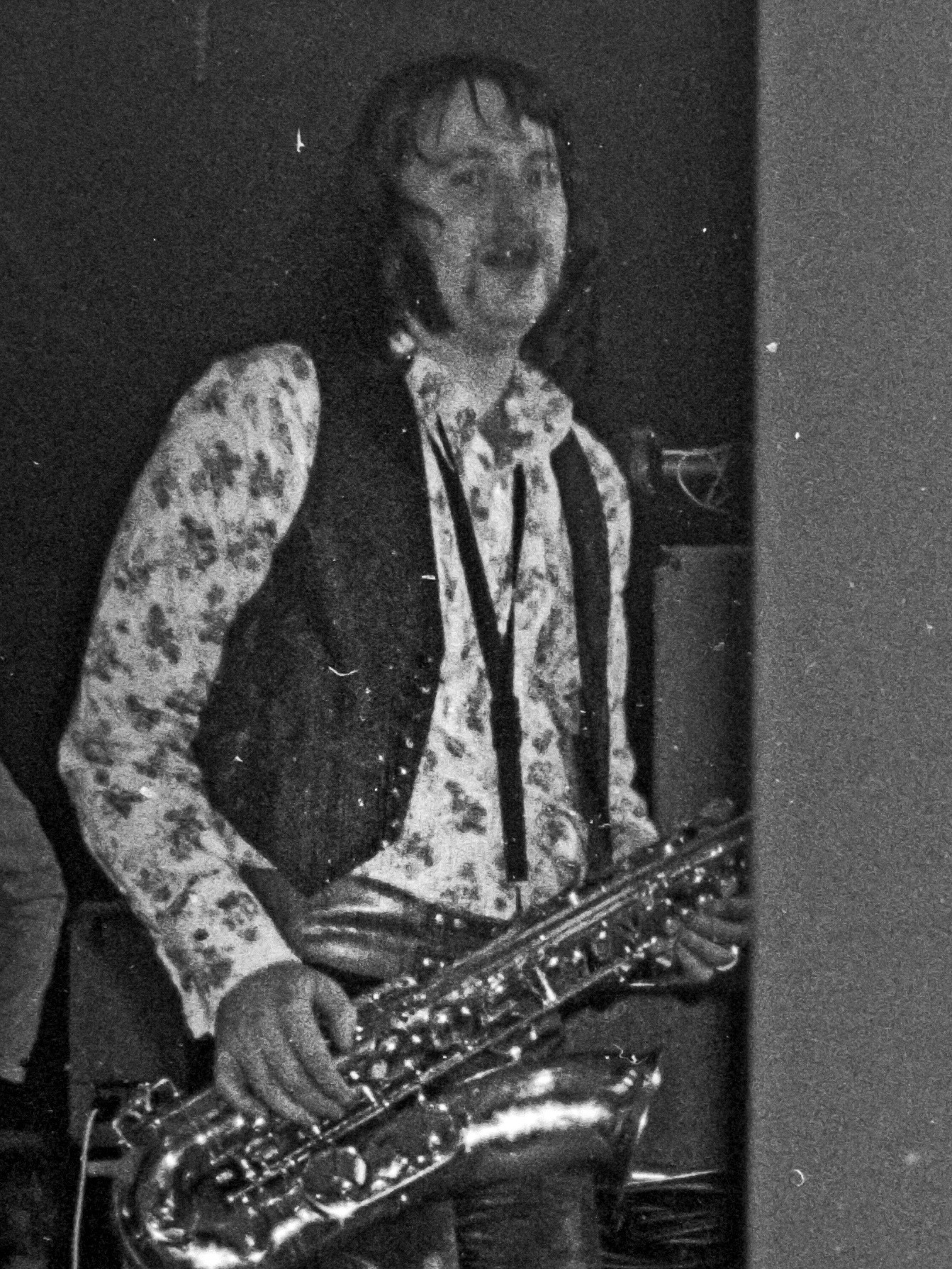
Almond with John Mayall in 1970.

Johnny Almond (20 July 1946 – 18 November 2009) was a British saxophonist, who is best known for his recordings with the Alan Price Set, Fleetwood Mac, John Mayall and Mark-Almond.

== Biography ==
Johnny Almond was born in Enfield, Middlesex, England. He played in Zoot Money's Big Roll Band and the Alan Price Set. Among others he worked as a session musician with John Mayall's Bluesbreakers, Chicken Shack and Fleetwood Mac.

In 1969, he had founded Johnny Almond's Music Machine and had recorded two solo albums, Patent Pending and Hollywood Blues. On Patent Pending, Almond is accompanied by Geoff Condon, Alan White, Jimmy Crawford, Steve Hammond, Roger Sutton and Johnny Wiggins. On Hollywood Blues he jammed with Curtis Amy, Hadley Caliman, Joe Harris, Charles Kynard, Ray Neapolitan, Joe Pass, Earl Palmer and Vi Redd.

In the same year he joined John Mayall (post-Bluesbreakers), with whom he toured and recorded The Turning Point (1969) and Empty Rooms (1969). There he met Jon Mark, with whom he formed Mark-Almond.

Mark-Almond's first two albums, Mark-Almond (1971) and Mark-Almond II (1972), were recorded for Bob Krasnow's Blue Thumb label, and were noted for their embossed envelope-style album covers. For the first album, "The Ghetto" received many plaudits and from the second "One Way Sunday" was a hit for them in the United States and received radio airplay on album-oriented rock stations in Boston, Massachusetts in 1970. The group then recorded two albums for Columbia Records, Rising (1972) and the live album Mark-Almond 73 (1973), by which time the group's members had grown to seven.

"What Am I Living For" from Mark-Almond 73 gained the group the most U.S. radio airplay they would get, but nevertheless they disbanded later that year.

Billy Joel announces "Johnny Almond on sax," after an early live performance of "New York State of Mind", including a saxophone solo, on his album Live at The Great American Music Hall (1975).

Notable musicians who have recorded or toured with Mark-Almond include drummer Dannie Richmond, drummer Billy Cobham, violinist Greg Bloch, keyboardist Tommy Eyre and bassist Roger Sutton. Eyre and Sutton later teamed in Riff Raff. A&M Records signed the duo in 1978 and released Other Peoples Rooms, but the record did not sell as well as earlier releases. Mark-Almond disbanded again in the mid 1980s, after releasing two albums, Tuesday in New York (1980) and a live offering The Last & Live (1981). In 1996, Mark-Almond reunited again for a CD release, Night Music, which featured keyboardist Mike Nock and others.

Almond lived in the San Francisco Bay Area. He occasionally surprised local bar owners, arriving with his saxophone to jam, some of which was recorded, including a rendition of "Stormy Monday".

He died on 18 November 2009 from cancer, aged 63 in Hayward, California, United States.

== Discography ==
=== Session musician ===
- John Mayall's Blues Breakers with Eric Clapton (1966)
- John Mayall's Blues Breakers: A Hard Road (1967)
- Chicken Shack: 40 Blue Fingers, Freshly Packed and Ready to Serve (1968)
- Fleetwood Mac: Mr. Wonderful (1968)
- Chicken Shack: O.K. Ken? (1969)
- John Mayall: Looking Back (1969)
- Martha Veléz: Fiends and Angels (1969)
- John Mayall: The Turning Point (1969)
- John Mayall: Empty Rooms (1970)
- Keef Hartley Band: Overdog (1971)
- John Mayall: Back to the Roots (John_Mayall_album) (1971)

=== Solo work ===
- Patent Pending (1969)
- Hollywood Blues (1970)

=== Band member ===
- John Mayall: The Turning Point (1969)
- John Mayall: Empty Rooms (1969)

=== Mark-Almond ===
- Mark-Almond (1971)
- Mark-Almond II (1972)
- Rising (1972)
- 73 (1973)
- To the Heart (1976)
- Other Peoples Rooms (1978)
- Tuesday in New York (1980)
- Last & Live (1981)
- Night Music (1996)
