= Empty Rooms =

Studio album by John Mayall
- Released: March 1970
- Studio: De Lane Lea Studios, London; Advision Studios, London; Broadway Recording Studios, New York; Larrabee Sound Studios, Hollywood
- Genre: Blues
- Length: 46:29
- Label: Polydor
- Producer: John Mayall

John Mayall chronology
The Turning Point (1969)	Empty Rooms (1970)	USA Union (1970)

Professional ratings
Review scores
Source	Rating
AllMusic	3/5 stars

Empty Rooms is a studio album by English blues musician John Mayall, released in March 1970 on Polydor. It is a follow-up to the live album The Turning Point, released earlier in the year with the same musicians: Jon Mark on acoustic guitar, Johnny Almond on saxophones and flute, and Stephen Thompson on bass. John Mayall sings, plays harmonica, guitars and keyboards (including a Moog synthesizer). Former Canned Heat bassist Larry Taylor guests as second bass player on one track, "To a Princess," improvising with Thompson on an unusual bass duet. The absence of a drummer leaves the rhythm rather fluid and the resulting sound is unusual, even for a John Mayall album. The songs, all written by Mayall, mostly addressed his romance with photographer Nancy Throckmorton, a theme he would pursue further on USA Union. The album is dedicated to her.

Empty Rooms was the only known set of studio recordings by the Turning Point lineup, which broke up shortly after the album was recorded. Larry Taylor, however, would join Mayall as one of three American musicians (electric guitarist Harvey Mandel, also a former member of Canned Heat; and, electric violinist Sugarcane Harris would complete the new lineup) to join him for USA Union.

== Track listing ==
All songs written by John Mayall, except where indicated.

1. "Don't Waste My Time" (Steve Thompson, Mayall) – 3:10
2. "Plan Your Revolution" – 2:38
3. "Don't Pick a Flower" (Jon Mark, Mayall) – 3:53
4. "Something New" (Jon Mark, Mayall) – 4:40
5. "People Cling Together" – 2:53
6. "Waiting for the Right Time" (Jon Mark, Mayall) – 5:36
7. "Thinking of My Woman" – 2:29
8. "Counting the Days" – 5:33
9. "When I Go" – 4:46
10. "Many Miles Apart" – 2:56
11. "To a Princess" – 3:34
12. "Lying in My Bed" – 4:21

== Charts ==
Chart (1970)	Peak position
Australia (Kent Music Report)	6
United Kingdom (Official Charts Company)	9

== Personnel ==
- John Mayall – vocals, harmonica, lead and 12-string guitars, bass Moog synthesizer
- Jon Mark – finger-style and 12-string guitar
- Johnny Almond – saxophone, flute
- Larry Taylor – bass ( tr.11 )
- Steve Thompson – bass

Technical

- Barry Ainsworth, Eddie Kramer, Eddy Offord, John Judnich – engineer
- Bob Gordon, Kevin McCarthy – photography

Jon Mark and Johnny Almond would leave the group just after the recording of this album, to form the duo Mark-Almond.
