= Back to the Roots (John Mayall album) =

Studio album by John Mayall
- Released: March 1971
- Recorded: 15–25 November 1970
- Studio: Larrabee Sound Studios; IBC Studios, London
- Genre: Blues
- Label: Polydor
- Producer: John Mayall

John Mayall chronology
USA Union (1970)	Back to the Roots (1971)	Memories (1971)

Professional ratings
Review scores
Source	Rating
AllMusic	3/5 stars
The Penguin Guide to Blues Recordings	2/4 stars

Back to the Roots is a 1971 double album by John Mayall released on Polydor. Recording sessions took place both in California and London where Mayall invited some former members of his band, notably guitarists Eric Clapton and Mick Taylor. At the end of the 1980s Mayall remixed some tracks and issued them along with some of the older material as Archives to Eighties. An expanded two-CD version of Back to the Roots now includes both the original and later remixed versions of the tracks.

Besides Mayall, who sang and played piano, harmonica and guitar, the musicians who recorded the original tracks were:

- Eric Clapton, Mick Taylor, Harvey Mandel and Jerry McGee on guitars;
- Larry Taylor and Steven Thompson on bass;
- Keef Hartley and Paul Lagos on drums;
- Don "Sugarcane" Harris on violin;
- Johnny Almond on saxophone and flute.

For Archives to Eighties Mayall recorded new bass and drums tracks played by Bobby Haynes and Joe Yuele.

== Track listing ==
All tracks written by John Mayall.

=== Original LP release ===
Side A

1. "Prisons on the Road" – 4:18
2. "My Children" – 5:10
3. "Accidental Suicide" – 6:17
4. "Groupie Girl" – 3:53
5. "Blue Fox" (instrumental) – 3:43

Side B

1. "Home Again" – 4:56
2. "Television Eye" – 7:32
3. "Marriage Madness" – 3:36
4. "Looking at Tomorrow" – 6:57

Side C

1. "Dream with Me" – 5:21
2. "Full Speed Ahead" – 5:21
3. "Mr. Censor Man" – 4:44
4. "Force of Nature" – 6:34
5. "Boogie Albert" (instrumental) – 2:15

Side D

1. "Goodbye, December" – 5:24
2. "Unanswered Questions" – 4:42
3. "Devil's Tricks" – 7:45
4. "Travelling" – 4:42

=== 2001 2-CD re-release track listing ===
CD 1

1. "Prisons on the Road" - 4:18
2. "My Children" - 5:10
3. "Accidental Suicide" - 6:17
4. "Groupie Girl" - 3:54
5. "Blue Fox" - 3:43
6. "Home Again" - 4:57
7. "Television Eye" - 7:32
8. "Marriage Madness" - 3:37
9. "Looking at Tomorrow" - 6:57
10. "Accidental Suicide" (remix) - 6:25
11. "Force of Nature" (remix) - 5:34
12. "Boogie Albert" (remix) - 2:16
13. "Television Eye" (remix) - 6:09

CD 2

1. "Dream with Me" - 5:22
2. "Full Speed Ahead" - 5:22
3. "Mr Censor Man" - 4:45
4. "Force of Nature" - 6:34
5. "Boogie Albert" - 2:16
6. "Goodbye December" - 5:25
7. "Unanswered Questions" - 4:42
8. "Devil's Trick" - 7:46
9. "Travelling" - 4:43
10. "Prisons on the Road" (remix) - 4:20
11. "Home Again" (remix) - 4:59
12. "Mr Censor Man" (remix) - 4:45
13. "Looking at Tomorrow" (remix) - 6:56

Tracks 10, 11, 12 & 13 on each CD are the Archives to Eighties overdubbed versions

All track listings taken from the album's liner notes and sleeves

== Charts ==
Chart (1971)	Peak position
Australia (Kent Music Report)	44
United Kingdom (Official Charts Company)	31

== Personnel ==
- John Mayall – guitar (on A3, B2, B4, C1, D1, D4), harmonica, piano, keyboards, vocals, artwork, illustration, design, photography
- Johnny Almond – bass flute, saxophone, tenor saxophone
- Eric Clapton – guitar (on A1, A3, B1, B4, C4, D1)
- Keef Hartley – drums
- Paul Lagos – drums
- Harvey Mandel – guitar (on A2, A3, A4, B2, C1, C4, D1, D2)
- Jerry McGee – guitar (on A5, D3)
- Larry Taylor – bass
- Mick Taylor – guitar (on A3, B3, C2, C3, C4, D3)
- Steve Thompson – bass (on C2)
- Don "Sugarcane" Harris – violin
- Joe Yuele – drums (on Archives to Eighties)
- Bobby Haynes – bass (on Archives to Eighties)

Technical

- Damon Lee-Shaw, John Judnich – engineer
- Barrie Wentzell, Dominique Tarlé, Gered Mankowitz, Nancy Throckmorton – photography
