= Progressive rock (radio format) =

Radio station programming format

Progressive rock is a radio station programming format that emerged in the late 1960s, in which disc jockeys are given wide latitude in what they may play, similar to the freeform format but with the proviso that some kind of rock music is almost always played. It enjoyed the height of its popularity in the late 1960s and 1970s. The name for the format began being used circa 1968, when serious disc jockeys were playing "progressive 'music for the head'" and discussing social issues in between records. During the late 1960s, as long-playing records began to supplant the single in popularity with rock audiences, progressive rock stations placed more emphasis on album tracks than did their AM counterparts. Throughout the 1970s, as FM stations moved to more structured formats, progressive rock evolved into album-oriented rock (AOR).

== Origins ==
When FM broadcasting licenses were first issued by the FCC, broadcasters were slow to take advantage of the new airwaves available to them because their advertising revenues were generated primarily from existing AM broadcasting stations and because there were few FM radio receivers owned by the general public. This void created an opportunity for the disenchanted youth of the counterculture of the 1960s and their counterparts, Hippies and Flower Children, to express themselves by playing music that was largely ignored by mainstream outlets. In this sense, progressive rock radio was more of a social response than a product marketed to fill a need. Inasmuch as the format was commercial, underground sought to capitalize on the maturing of the Baby Boomers who were growing out of the top 40 radio of their youth, which was still targeting teens.

This change coincided with the greater emphasis on albums as opposed to singles in the rock market. Underground stations clearly disdained Top 40 music and made it a policy to avoid playing it. A dilemma grew because many underground artists were contractually obligated to release a certain amount of singles and FCC regulations required such songs to be 3 minutes long, or less. These "single versions" were often quite different than what was on the originating albums. Underground radio could liberally play what were referred to as "the album versions" of songs, no matter how long they were. By the same token, hugely popular and successful albums such as The Beatles' Sgt. Pepper's Lonely Hearts Club Band and Arlo Guthrie's Alice's Restaurant did not contain any singles. In fact, the actual song "Alice's Restaurant" is the entire Side A of its titular album, coming in at over 18 minutes, making it way over the 3-minute mandate, grew to fame in part because of persistent airplay from underground radio host Bob Fass, and later became a Thanksgiving tradition on other underground/progressive stations. Many DJs at underground stations also chose to play entire sides of albums that contained multiple tracks, which could range from 20 to 30 minutes. This was as much a practical decision as it was a creative one: in an era before automation and voice-tracking, disc jockeys largely had to remain in the studio to manually change each track, and a long record allowed the jockey to step away from the studio long enough to, for example, use the toilet.

At that time, these actions were considered very bold, so there was clearly a need for a radio format that could not only explore beyond the Top 40, but be allowed to do so with the DJs leading the way. This in turn led to established and new rock artists placing greater emphasis on long or experimental album tracks, knowing they would receive radio airplay.

== Definition ==
The progressive rock radio format should not be confused with the progressive rock music genre. While progressive rock music was certainly played on progressive rock radio stations, a number of other varieties of rock music were also played. Generally everything from early Beatles and early Dylan on forward was fair game. Progressive rock radio was generally the only outlet for fringe rock genres such as space rock, jazz fusion, and quiet, acoustic-based folk rock and country rock (often played on weekend mornings). Progressive stations were also known for having "turntable hits", songs by obscure artists that did not sell much and were not hits by any conventional measure, but which listeners kept calling up and requesting; Sweet Thursday's "Gilbert Street" was a good example on the East Coast.

The progressive rock radio format grew out of the freeform radio format, and, sharing the key characteristic of disc jockeys having the freedom to play what they chose, has sometimes been referred to as "freeform rock radio" or "freeform progressive radio" or simply "FM rock radio". But as they evolved there were key differences between the freeform and progressive rock formats:

- Freeform could play any genre of music; progressive rock generally limited itself to (various kinds of) rock.
- After its early days, freeform tended towards small or "underground" stations in non-commercial or niche markets; progressive rock could and did handle big-signal stations in large markets.
- Progressive rock was intended to be as fully commercially viable as any other mainstream radio format; freeform usually shunned such ambitions.
- The progressive rock format had a large impact on the commercial rock music industry at the time; the freeform format generally did not.

== Stations and personnel ==
The archetypal successful and influential progressive rock radio station was WNEW-FM in New York in the late 1960s, 1970s, and into the 1980s. For instance, Keith Emerson credited it for breaking Emerson, Lake & Palmer into the United States market. Other long-running, large-market examples included WMMR in Philadelphia (credited with helping to break Bruce Springsteen), WBCN in Boston, WHFS in Washington, D.C., WXRT in Chicago, WMMS in Cleveland, WEBN in Cincinnati, CJOM, WWWW and WABX in Detroit/Windsor, WZMF in Milwaukee, KQRS-FM in Minneapolis, WOWI in Norfolk, WORJ-FM in Orlando, KSHE in St. Louis, KDKB in Phoenix, KMET in Los Angeles, KSAN in San Francisco, KZAP and KSFM (102.5) in Sacramento, KZEW in Dallas, KATT-FM in Oklahoma City, and KTIM in San Rafael. Many of the higher-profile stations among these were owned by Metromedia. College progressive rock radio stations included WVBR in Ithaca, New York, WKNC in Raleigh, North Carolina, WBRU in Providence, Rhode Island, WRPI in Troy, New York, and WWUH in Hartford, Connecticut.

Pioneering progressive rock radio disc jockey and program directors included Scott Muni in New York, Lee Arnold in Orlando, Tom Donahue in San Francisco, and Jim Santella in Buffalo.

== Later developments ==
Over time (some much faster than others), the large-city progressive rock stations usually lost DJ freedom and adopted the more structured and confined album-oriented rock (AOR) format in the late 1970s and 1980s, and then later the nostalgic classic rock format in the 1980s and 1990s, while the smaller stations sometimes turned to college rock or alternative rock. The trend had begun in the early 1970s as national station owners such as Gordon McLendon had decided that the format was too unprofessional to serve a broad audience, believing that his underground stations were not achieving their potential (in reality, most of the reason for any ratings lagging was a lag in FM receiver adoption; McLendon's Buffalo station WPHD had the market's best ratings with its freeform program hosted by Jim Santella, but only in the evening hours where listeners had home receivers). Where once "progressive rock radio [was] the key media of ascendant rock culture", as writer Nelson George put it, by 1987, musician and author Robert Palmer would write, "The glory days of 'progressive' rock radio - when the disk jockey actually chose the records he played and creatively juxtaposed songs and styles - are long gone."

While freeform stations are still around in the 2000s, such as New Jersey's WFMU, and for a while WXRC in Charlotte, North Carolina, recalled the format's original sound, there may be no real examples of the specific progressive rock radio format in existence today on the FM dial. The closest thing to a progressive rock station may be the Deep Tracks channel on Sirius XM Satellite Radio, which plays some of the music originally heard on progressive rock radio, but without pronounced disc jockey personalities or the full feel of the original format. "Stuck in the Psychedelic Era," a syndicated program heard on some non-commercial stations, recreates the format, but rarely includes any recordings made after 1970. Some of the spirit of progressive rock radio (albeit in a more mellow, "adult" form) can also be found in the adult album alternative format.
