= New Year, New Band, New Company =

Studio album by John Mayall
- Released: March 1975
- Genre: Blues
- Length: 43:22
- Label: ABC
- Producer: John Mayall

John Mayall chronology
The Latest Edition (1974)	New Year, New Band, New Company (1975)	Notice to Appear (1975)

Singles from New Year, New Band, New Company
- 1. "Step in the Sun" Released: 1975

New Year, New Band, New Company is the fifteenth studio album by English blues guitarist John Mayall, released in March 1975 by ABC Records.

== Reception ==
Professional ratings
Review scores
Source	Rating
AllMusic	2/5 stars

Billboard magazine wrote Mayall "has managed to put together a remarkable array of talent", concluding the album sounds "closest to the blues Mayall sang nearly a decade ago than anything he has done in sometime". Cashbox magazine notes in their review of the album that it is a "fine debut" for ABC Records, believing the musicians on the album are "making music with an enthusiasm and spirit that's impossible to ignore", ending Mayall "displays his poise and insight throughout the LP" while highlighting "Sitting on the Outside" and "To Match the Wind". Record World gave it a positive review, believing Mayall "returns afresh on all levels, with his sturdy blues roots now embellished".

== Track listing ==
Side one

1. "Sitting on the Outside" – 6:01
2. "Can't Get Home" – 4:03
3. "Step in the Sun" – 3:13
4. "To Match the Wind" – 4:32
5. "Sweet Scorpio" – 3:20

Side two

1. "Driving On" – 2:23
2. "Taxman Blues" – 3:10
3. "So Much to Do" – 6:25
4. "My Train Time" – 4:42
5. "Respectfully Yours" – 5:20

== Personnel ==
- John Mayall – vocals, harmonica, guitar
- Rick Vito – lead guitar
- Soko Richardson – drums
- Jay Spell – electric piano, clavinet
- Larry Taylor – fretless bass
- Don Harris – violin, vocals
- Dee McKinnie – vocals

== Charts ==
Weekly chart performance for New Year, New Band, New Company
Chart (1975)	Peak position
Australia (Kent Music Report)	87
US Billboard 200	140
