= Marianne Faithfull (album) =

Studio album by Marianne Faithfull
- Released: 15 April 1965
- Recorded: 1964–1965
- Studio: Lansdowne Studios; Decca No. 2 Studio, London
- Genre: Pop rock; baroque pop
- Length: 33:21
- Label: Decca; London
- Producer: Tony Calder

Marianne Faithfull chronology
Marianne Faithfull (1965)	Come My Way (1965)

Singles from Marianne Faithfull
- 1. "As Tears Go By" Released: 26 June 1964; 2. "Come and Stay With Me" Released: 5 February 1965; 3. "This Little Bird" Released: 30 April 1965

Professional ratings
Review scores
Source	Rating
AllMusic	3/5 stars

Marianne Faithfull is the debut studio album by English singer Marianne Faithfull. It was released simultaneously with her album Come My Way on 15 April 1965 by Decca Records. The double release was a result of different creative directions. While the record label pressed Faithfull to record a pop album, she wanted to record an album of folk songs. Even after the label suggested an album containing both genres, Faithfull decided to make two separate albums instead; Marianne Faithfull as the pop album and Come My Way as the folk album. In the United States, it was released by London Records with a slightly different track list and inclusion of the song "This Little Bird".

== Production ==
The arrangements were by David Whittaker and Jon Mark with Mike Leander directing the arrangements. The engineer at Decca Studios was Peter Hitchcock and Gus Dudgeon at Lansdowne Studios, Holland Park.

== Artwork ==
The front cover photography is by David Bailey and the back by Gered Mankowitz.

== Track listing ==
Marianne Faithfull – UK edition
No.	Title	Writer(s)	Length
1.	"Come and Stay With Me"	Jackie DeShannon	2:25
2.	"If I Never Get to Love You"	Burt Bacharach; Hal David	2:15
3.	"Time Takes Time"	Barry Fantoni; Marianne Faithfull	1:40
4.	"He'll Come Back to Me"	Claude-Henri Vic; Michael Farr; Robert Gall	2:33
5.	"Down Town"	Tony Hatch	2:45
6.	"Plaisir d'amour"	David Whitaker	2:34
7.	"Can't You Hear My Heartbeat"	John Carter; Ken Lewis	2:24
8.	"As Tears Go By"	Andrew Loog Oldham; Mick Jagger; Keith Richards	2:35
9.	"Paris Bells"	Jon Birchell	2:45
10.	"They Never Will Leave You"	André Popp; Jean-Jacques Debout	2:07
11.	"What Have They Done to the Rain"	Malvina Reynolds	2:53
12.	"In My Time of Sorrow"	DeShannon; Jimmy Page	2:20
13.	"What Have I Done Wrong"	Farr	1:50
14.	"I'm a Loser"	John Lennon; Paul McCartney	2:15
Total length:			33:21

Marianne Faithfull – US edition
No.	Title	Writer(s)	Length
1.	"This Little Bird"	John D. Loudermilk	2:00
2.	"I'm a Loser"	Lennon; McCartney	2:15
3.	"What Have They Done to the Rain"	Reynolds	2:53
4.	"In My Time of Sorrow"	DeShannon; Page	2:20
5.	"What Have I Done Wrong"	Farr	1:50
6.	"Come and Stay With Me"	DeShannon	2:25
7.	"As Tears Go By"	Oldham; Jagger; Richards	2:35
8.	"If I Never Get to Love You"	Bacharach; David	2:15
9.	"Time Takes Time"	Fantoni; Faithfull	1:40
10.	"He'll Come Back to Me"	Vic; Farr; Gall	2:33
11.	"Paris Bells"	Birchell	2:45
12.	"Plaisir d'amour"	Whitaker	2:34
Total length:			28:05

Marianne Faithfull – UK edition 1989 CD reissue (bonus tracks)
No.	Title	Writer(s)	Length
15.	"Morning Sun"	Mike Leander	3:05
16.	"Greensleeves"		2:43
17.	"House of the Rising Sun" (Version 1)		4:12
18.	"The Sha La La Song"	Farr	2:28
19.	"Oh Look Around You"	Faithfull	3:00
20.	"I'd Like to Dial Your Number"	Faithfull	2:52

== Personnel ==
- Marianne Faithfull – vocals
- Tony Calder – producer
- Mike Leander – arrangements, direction
- David Whitaker – arrangements
- Jon Mark – arrangements
- Peter Hitchcock – engineer
- Gus Dudgeon – engineer
- David Bailey – photography
- Gered Mankowitz – photography

Credits adapted from the album liner notes.

== Charts ==
Chart (1965)	Peak position
UK Albums (OCC)	15
US Billboard 200	12
US Cash Box Top 100 Albums	19
