= Come and Stay with Me =

Single by Marianne Faithfull

from the album Marianne Faithfull
- B-side: "What Have I Done Wrong?"
- Released: 5 February 1965
- Genre: Pop
- Length: 3:25
- Label: Decca
- Songwriter: Jackie DeShannon
- Producer: Andrew Loog Oldham

Marianne Faithfull singles chronology
"Blowin' in the Wind" (1964)	"Come and Stay with Me" (1965)	"This Little Bird" (1965)

"Come and Stay with Me" is a pop song, written by Jackie DeShannon in 1965 for the British singer Marianne Faithfull. It became one of her biggest hits, peaking #4 at United Kingdom.

== Background ==
Faithfull's former manager Tony Calder told Mojo magazine in September 2008 that the song was written in Los Angeles, where he was with Jimmy Page who had an affair with DeShannon: "One night I couldn't get into our hotel room because Jimmy and Jackie DeShannon were shagging. So I yelled, 'When you've finished could you write a song for Marianne?'" DeShannon came up with this song plus with Page an album track, "In My Time of Sorrow."

== Charts ==
Chart (1965)	Peak position
US Billboard Hot 100	26
UK Singles (Official Charts)	4
Australia Kent Music Report	6
Ireland IRMA	6
French Singles Chart	43
Canada Top Singles (RPM)	7
Quebec (ADISQ)	13

== Other versions ==
- Ola & the Janglers, a Swedish pop group, recorded a cover version in 1966. It peaked on #3 on the Swedish Radio chart Tio i Topp on 9 April.
- DeShannon recorded the song herself on her 1968 album Laurel Canyon.
