= Faithfull Forever =

Studio album by Marianne Faithfull
- Released: September 1966
- Genre: Folk rock
- Label: London
- Producer: Mike Leander

Marianne Faithfull chronology
North Country Maid (1966)	Faithfull Forever (1966)	Love in a Mist (1967)

Faithfull Forever is the third American studio album by British singer Marianne Faithfull.

"Some Other Spring", "Lucky Girl" and "I'm the Sky" are unique to this album. The rest of the songs had been released as singles or would later be released on her next UK album Love in a Mist, although the version of "Counting" is a different mix from its European release, and "The First Time Ever I Saw Your Face," with choral overdubs, differs significantly from the one on her previous UK album North Country Maid. Mike Leander was the arranger; Gus Dudgeon and Vic Smith were the engineers and Jean-Marie Perrier for the photography.

== Track listing ==
1. "Counting" (Bob Lind) - 2:52
2. "Tomorrow's Calling" (Eric Woolfson) - 2:58
3. "The First Time Ever I Saw Your Face" (Ewan MacColl) - 3:47
4. "With You in Mind" (Jackie DeShannon) - 2:26
5. "In the Night Time" (Donovan) - 3:05
6. "Ne Me Quitte Pas" (Love theme from The Umbrellas of Cherbourg) (Jacques Demy, Michel Legrand) - 2:35
7. "Monday, Monday" (John Phillips) - 3:07
8. "Some Other Spring" (Arthur Herzog, Jr., Irene Kitchings) - 2:30
9. "That's Right Baby" (Michael Farr) - 2:48
10. "Lucky Girl" (Barry Mason, Les Reed) - 2:55
11. "I'm the Sky" (Norma Tanega) - 2:30
12. "I Have a Love" (Leonard Bernstein, Stephen Sondheim) - 2:50

== Charts ==
Chart (1966)	Peak position
US Billboard 200	147
