= Sweet Thursday (album) =

Studio album by Sweet Thursday
- Released: 1969
- Studio: Trident Studios, London
- Genre: Rock
- Length: 43:56
- Label: Tetragrammaton Records (US 1969); Great Western Gramophone (US 1973); M.I.L. Multimedia (US 1998)
- Producer: Hugh Murphy

Professional ratings
Review scores
Source	Rating
AllMusic.com	4/5 stars
The Village Voice	B

Sweet Thursday is the debut, and only, album by the late 1960s British rock band Sweet Thursday. Its chance of success was cut short by the almost-immediate failure of the record label.

== History ==
The album was recorded at Trident Studios in London. It is notable for featuring keyboardist Nicky Hopkins (who worked with the Rolling Stones and The Who among many others) and Bluesbreakers alum Jon Mark (who would go on to form the group Mark-Almond). It was produced by Hugh Murphy, who later became known for his work with Gerry Rafferty. Recording and engineering was done by Barry Sheffield.

The album was originally released in the US in August 1969 on Tetragrammaton Records(catalogue T-112). (The band had signed with that label in November 1968, and the copyright on the label was from 1968.)

Radio commercials were used to promote the album and Tetragrammaton's other releases. However, by late 1969 Tetragrammaton was already headed for financial failure and bankruptcy (by legend, the same day the album was released).

Sweet Thursday's release history outside the US is less clear. It may have been originally released on Fontana Records in the UK. An initial European release in 1970 on Polydor (catalogue 2310051) appears to have been made, that featured an alternate album cover depicted a torn-off calendar page resting on a bed of leaves.

The album's style mixed typical mid- and late-1960s British rock elements such as R&B, blues, and psychedelia. The piano and organ based arrangements and slightly abstract lyric narratives also showed a pronounced debt to Bob Dylan's Blonde on Blonde. All but one of the album's songs were written by group members. AllMusic's Bruce Eder views "Rescue Me" as one of the better tracks, showing the influence that the group members had had, like many others in the British R&B scene, from playing in Zoot Money's Big Roll Band and the Cyril Davies All-Stars. Eder says that the band's songwriting is largely unmemorable, while Billboard magazine wrote in 1973 that the album "offers a strong mix of rock, ballads, and folky material, with strong vocals and instrumentals running throughout." In 1970, the St. Petersburg Times saw the group as "smooth" and the record worthy of inclusion in its "Unusual Albums" section.

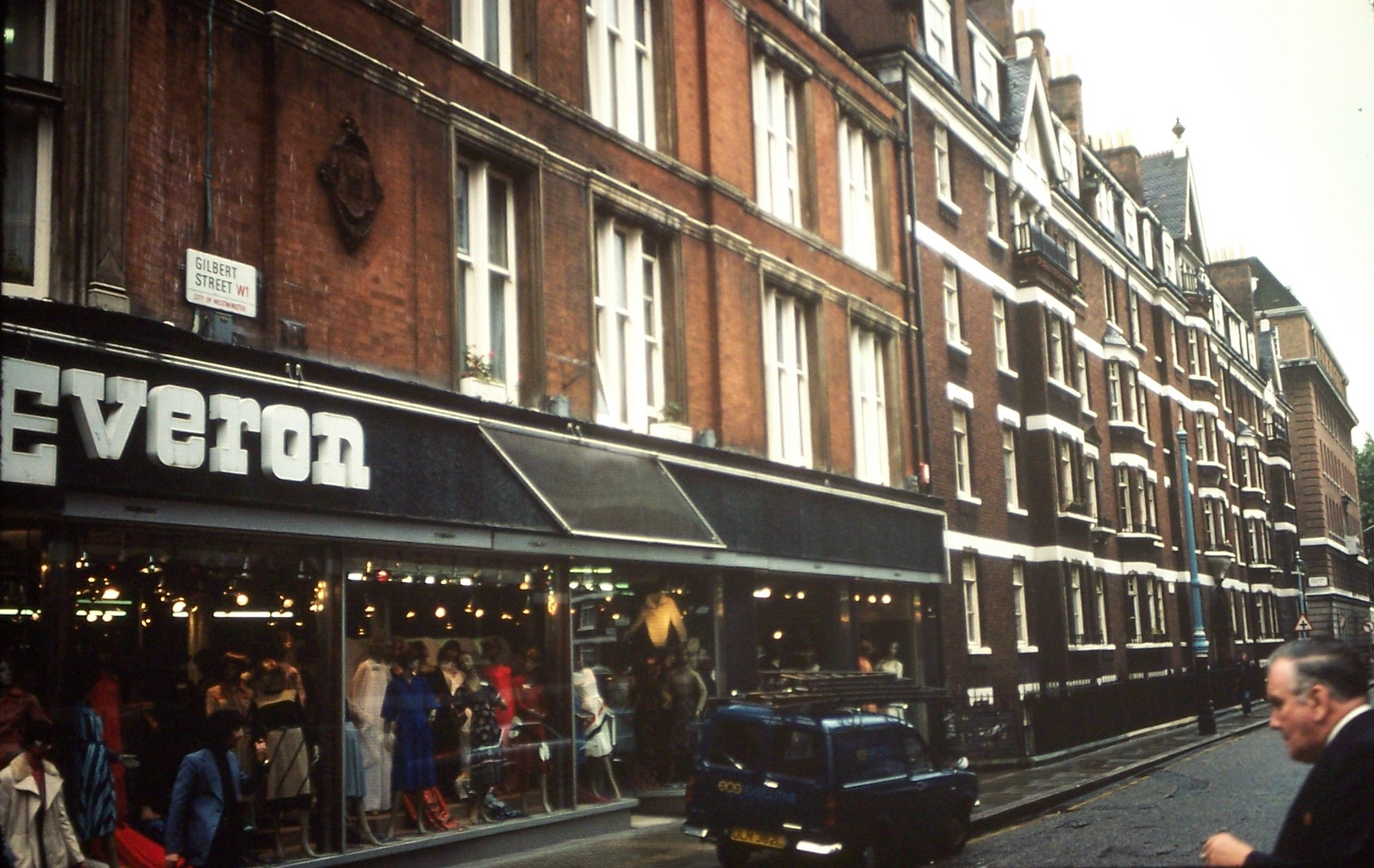
Gilbert Street in London in 1977

The moody, evocative ten-minute track "Gilbert Street" was the album's centerpiece and generally acclaimed as its best track. Written by group friend Pat Gunning and named after a short side street in London's Mayfair area, the mid-tempo number, built around acoustic guitar and organ, describes a complex quest for a mysterious lady in blue. The fuzz guitar-laced refrain directs one to the Central line and the Bond Street tube station in order to reach this point. The song became a turntable hit when it was played on American progressive rock radio, such as by Scott Muni on WNEW-FM in New York.

Sweet Thursday never released another record.

The album was reissued on Great Western Gramophone – a joint venture label formed between Jerry Heller, a manager, and Clive Davis, an executive of Columbia Records – in the US in 1973 (catalogue KZ 32039). By now the album had attracted enough underground interest that the label took out a full-page ad in Rolling Stone magazine to announce the re-release. During the second quarter of 1973, college radio stations such as WHUS-FM and WVOF in Connecticut, WVBU-FM in Pennsylvania, and WTUL-FM in New Orleans all reported adding the album to their playlists. Great Western also released "Jenny", backed with "Dealer", as a single from the album. Also in 1973, it was re-released for Line Records, a label in Germany (catalogue LLP 5044, 6.24350 AP).

Over the years the album, and others from Tetragrammaton, was subjected to vinyl bootlegging and CD releases of questionable legality. An April 1998 CD release from M.I.L. Multimedia became the first clearly legitimate one. The original Tetragrammaton LP has not been a big item on the collector's market, fetching only $20 by the mid-2000s. Some CD issues contain two bonus tracks, those being from the group's December 1968 Tetragrammaton single "Getting It Together" backed with "Mary on the Runaround", both composed by Jon Mark.

== Track listing ==
All tracks composed by Jon Mark; except where noted

Side one

1. "Dealer" – 5:43
2. "Jenny" – 3:46
3. "Laughed at Him" – 5:10
4. "Cobwebs" (Brian Odgers) – 3:23
5. "Rescue Me" – 3:41

Side two

1. "Molly" (Brian Odgers) – 3:04
2. "Sweet Francesca" – 3:57
3. "Side of the Road" (Alun Davies) – 4:50
4. "Gilbert Street" (Pat Gunning) – 10:22

== Personnel ==
Sweet Thursday

- Alun Davies – acoustic and electric guitars, vocals
- Jon Mark – acoustic and electric guitars, vocals
- Nicky Hopkins – keyboards, organ, piano
- Brian Odgers – bass, woodwinds, flute
- Harvey Burns – drums, percussion

Technical

- Barry Sheffield – engineer
- Jeremy Banks – design
- Richard Imrie – design, photography
