= Władysław Rząb =

Polish painter and sculptor

Władysław Rząb (18 May 1910 — 13 August 1992) was a Polish painter and sculptor.

== Biography ==
Władysław Rząb was born on 18 May 1910 in Zgierz in Poland in a working-class family. His paintings and sculptures were presented at national and regional painting exhibitions of amateur art in Poland and abroad in the period 1946 - 2012. He was a member of the Association of the Polish Artist starting 1986. In 2005 one of the street in Zgierz was named his name.

Władysław Rząb as an artist belonged to the ‘expressionism school’ of paintings.

== Works in collections of ==
- Silesian Museum in Katowice
- Museum of the Town of Zgierz
- Historical Museum of the City of Łódź
- Jacek Malczewski Museum in Radom
- Ethnographic Museum in Cracow
