= Come My Way =

Studio album by Marianne Faithfull
- Released: 15 April 1965
- Recorded: 1964–65
- Studios: IBC Studios, London
- Genre: Folk
- Length: 32:44
- Labels: Decca; London
- Producer: Tony Calder

Marianne Faithfull chronology
Marianne Faithfull (1965)	Come My Way (1965)	Go Away from My World (1965)

Professional ratings
Review scores
Source	Rating
AllMusic	2.5/5 stars

Come My Way is the second studio album by English singer Marianne Faithfull. It was released simultaneously with her album Marianne Faithfull on 15 April 1965 by Decca Records. The double release was a result of different creative directions. While the record label pressed Faithfull to record a pop album, she wanted to record an album of folk songs. Even after the label suggested an album containing both genres, Faithfull decided to make two separate albums instead; Marianne Faithfull as the pop album and Come My Way as the folk album.

== Production ==
The album was arranged by acoustic guitarist Jon Mark. Martin Haines was the engineer. Big Jim Sullivan played acoustic guitar on the album. Keith Richards played acoustic guitar on the "Blowin' in the Wind"/"House of the Rising Sun" single released on October 23, 1964.

== Artwork ==
The cover photography is by Gered Mankowitz and the design is by Chris O'Dell. It was taken in The Salisbury public house, Covent Garden, London.

== Track listing ==
Come My Way
No.	Title	Writer(s)	Length
1.	"Come My Way"	Jon Mark	2:05
2.	"Jaberwock"	Traditional; arranged by Jon Mark	2:34
3.	"Portland Town"	Traditional; arranged by Jon Mark	2:59
4.	"House of the Rising Sun"	Traditional; arranged by Jon Mark	2:28
5.	"Spanish Is a Loving Tongue"	Charles Badger Clark/Billy Simon	2:43
6.	"Fare Thee Well"	Traditional; arranged by Jon Mark	2:52
7.	"Lonesome Traveller"	Lee Hays	2:05
8.	"Down in the Salley Garden"	Traditional; arranged by Jon Mark	2:06
9.	"Mary Ann"	Traditional; arranged by Jon Mark	1:45
10.	"Full Fathom Five"	Traditional; arranged by Jon Mark	1:27
11.	"Four Strong Winds"	Ian Tyson	3:00
12.	"Black Girl"	Traditional; arranged by Jon Mark	2:28
13.	"Once I Had a Sweetheart"	Traditional; arranged by Jon Mark	2:08
14.	"Bells of Freedom"	Traditional; arranged by Mark-Sullivan	2:04
Total length:			32:44

Come My Way – 1991 CD reissue (bonus tracks)
No.	Title	Writer(s)	Length
15.	"Blowin' in the Wind"	Bob Dylan
16.	"Et Maintenant (What Now My Love?)"	Gilbert Bécaud; Pierre Delanoë
17.	"That's Right Baby"	Michael Farr
18.	"Sister Morphine"	Marianne Faithfull; Mick Jagger; Keith Richards

== Charts ==
Chart (1965)	Peak position
UK Albums (Official Charts)	12
