= Sweet Thursday (band) =

English rock band

- Origin: England
- Genres: Rock, British blues, Folk rock
- Years active: 1968–1969
- Labels: Tetragrammaton Records
- Members: Nicky Hopkins; Alun Davies; Jon Mark; Harvey Burns; Brian Odgers

Sweet Thursday was a short-lived late-1960s English rock band.

The group included famed session keyboard player Nicky Hopkins, who had worked with The Beatles, The Rolling Stones, Jeff Beck, and many others; folk guitarist, singer, and past session man Alun Davies (subsequently a frequent collaborator of Cat Stevens'); and singer, guitarist, composer and past Davies cohort Jon Mark (later of Mark-Almond). Thus Sweet Thursday was arguably a minor instance of the "supergroup" phenomenon. Other members were drummer Harvey Burns and bassist, woodwinds player and songwriter Brian Odgers.

In December 1968, Tetragrammaton released a single which contained "Getting It Together" (Side A) and "Mary on the Runaround" (Side B) which were composed by Jon Mark but were not included on the group's lone album. Both songs were released as bonus tracks on a CD edition of the group's debut album Sweet Thursday.

The group's lone album Sweet Thursday was released in August 1969 in the U.S. on Tetragrammaton Records (the band had signed with that label in November 1968). It is most remembered for the ten-minute-long progressive rock radio turntable hit "Gilbert Street", written by Patrick Gunning in 1967. The record company went bust soon thereafter, after only a very limited record pressing. Sweet Thursday dissolved.

== Discography ==
- "Getting It Together" / "Mary on the Runaround" (Tetragrammaton Records T-1512, December 1968)
- Sweet Thursday (1969)
