= The Turning Point (John Mayall album) =

1969 live album by John Mayall

Live album by John Mayall
- Released: October 1969
- Recorded: 12 July 1969
- Venue: Fillmore East, New York City, New York
- Genre: Blues
- Length: 47:24
- Label: Polydor
- Producer: John Mayall

John Mayall chronology
| Blues from Laurel Canyon (1968) | The Turning Point (1969) | Empty Rooms (1970) |

Professional ratings
Review scores
| Source | Rating |
|---|---|
| Allmusic | 4.5/5 stars |
| PopMatters | (favourable) |
| The Penguin Guide to Blues Recordings | 3.5/4 stars |

The Turning Point is a live album by John Mayall, featuring British blues music recorded at a concert at Bill Graham's Fillmore East on 12 July 1969.

== Background ==
When John Mayall was starting another band after the break-up of the Bluesbreakers in May 1969, he decided to have a band that would play "low volume music" – or music without "heavy lead guitar and drums".

=== Musicians ===
The performers on the album were Mayall on vocals, harmonica, a slide and a Fender Telecaster guitar, a tambourine, and mouth percussion, Jon Mark on acoustic guitar, Steve Thompson on bass, and Johnny Almond on tenor and alto saxophones, flutes, and mouth percussion. All the songs on the album were written or co-written by John Mayall. Thompson co-wrote "California", "Thoughts About Roxanne" and "Don't Waste My Time". Another track, "I'm Gonna Fight For You, J.B.", is a tribute to the American blues guitarist J. B. Lenoir who died in 1967 and who had a deep influence on Mayall (this was Mayall's second such tribute to the musician; "The Death of J.B. Lenoir" appeared on his earlier Crusade album). Two concerts took place, on 11 and 12 July. All tracks are from the second gig.

=== Production ===
The album was produced by John Mayall, who also designed the packaging and was the album's art director. The recording engineer was Eddie Kramer, who had engineered Jimi Hendrix and Led Zeppelin, among others.

== Reissues ==
In 2001, a remastered CD reissue included three additional tracks from the same performance.

Earlier recordings of the same material, live from June 1969 in England, were released in 1999 on the first CD of the two-CD set The Masters (the second disc contains mostly interviews). A concert at the Marquee on June 30, 1969, featuring a similar playlist, has been issued. The music from the two CD's of The Masters and the performance at the Marquee were released in 2004 as a 2-CD package, The Turning Point Soundtrack, credited to John Mayall and the Bluesbreakers. Portions of these earlier rehearsals and performances had been filmed, and were released as a 25-minute black-and-white 1996 BBC TV documentary The Turning Point. (They were included, as well, on a 2003 DVD, Godfather of British Blues/The Turning Point.).

== Track listing ==
All songs written by John Mayall, except where indicated.

Side one

1. "The Laws Must Change" – 7:21
2. "Saw Mill Gulch Road" – 4:39
3. "I'm Gonna Fight for You J.B." – 5:27
4. "So Hard to Share" – 7:05

Side two

1. "California" (Mayall, Steve Thompson) – 9:30
2. "Thoughts About Roxanne" (Mayall, Thompson) – 8:20
3. "Room to Move" – 5:03

Bonus tracks (2001 reissue)

8. "Sleeping by Her Side" – 5.10
9. "Don't Waste My Time" (Mayall, Thompson) – 4.54
10. "Can't Sleep This Night" – 6.19

Other recordings of the same material:

- Live at The Marquee '69 = tracks 8, 4, 9, 3, 1, 5, 5.
- The Masters= tracks 9, 8, 7, 2, 10, 6, 3,3 (CD1); 2, 5, 9, 6, Parchman farm (CD2)
- The Turning Point Soundtrack=The Masters+Live at The Marquee '69

== Personnel ==
Musicians

- John Mayall – vocals, harmonica, slide guitar, Telecaster 6-string guitar, tambourine, mouth percussion
- Jon Mark – acoustic finger-style guitar
- Steve Thompson – bass guitar
- Johnny Almond – tenor and alto saxophones, flutes, mouth percussion

Production

- Producer: John Mayall
- Engineer: Eddie Kramer
- Photographers: Barry Wentzell, John Mayall, Dieter Zill, Larry La Fond, Bill Gordon, Tapani Tapanainen
- Design and artwork: John Mayall
