= Tony Calder =

British music industry executive

- Born: 27 June 1943
- Origin: London, England
- Died: 2 January 2018 (aged 74)
- Occupations: Talent spotter, manager, impresario and author
- Formerly of: Rolling Stones, Small Faces, Marianne Faithfull, Eddy Grant, Jive Bunny and the Mastermixers

Tony Calder (27 June 1943 – 2 January 2018) was an English record manager, impresario, talent-spotter, promoter and public relations agent. He was Andrew Loog Oldham's business partner from 1963 to December 1969.

During a career spanning over 50 years he was instrumental in promoting a number of successful songs in the UK Singles Chart, including the Rolling Stones "Little Red Rooster" and "Paint It Black", the Small Faces "Itchycoo Park", Amen Corner's "(If Paradise Is) Half as Nice", Eddy Grant's "I Don't Wanna Dance" and Jive Bunny and the Mastermixers single "Swing the Mood".

== 1960s ==
Calder was born in Surbiton, Surrey to Scottish parents. His grounding in the music industry began in the early 1960s at Decca Records under the direction of Edward Lewis. By day he worked in the sales and marketing department. which gave him a significant insight into the music industry and led him to meeting Brian Epstein, The Beatles, Andrew Loog Oldham and Seymour Stein (who introduced Calder to his all-time record hero George Goldner).

In 1962, Calder was hired by Brian Epstein to promote The Beatles single "Love Me Do", which he did successfully by sending free copies to the top fifty Mecca Ballrooms and also the opposition Top Rank ballrooms, in order to persuade the local independent record shops to order the record. The following year pop impresario Andrew Oldham and Calder merged their clientele to set up the UK's first independent PR-pop company, 'IMAGE.', and handled the day-to-day management of the Rolling Stones, and later the promotion of the Beach Boys via their publishing contract.

In early 1965, Calder did his first and last record production, taking over from Oldham producing Marianne Faithfull, producing her biggest hits "Come and Stay With Me", which reached Number 4 in the UK Singles Chart and "This Little Bird", which reached Number 6 in 1965. In 1965, Calder and Oldham formed Immediate Records, the first major independent label in the UK, eventually responsible for acts such as The Small Faces, Fleetwood Mac, Rod Stewart, The McCoys, Chris Farlowe, Amen Corner, P.P. Arnold and The Nice. He also worked with Vashti Bunyan for the label, although it was not until the 2000s that she became a cult hero. At the end of 1969, Calder left Immediate Records.

== 1970s ==
In 1971, Calder signed the new band Bay City Rollers with his booking agent business partner David Apps, but quickly relinquished the contract to Dick Leahy, head of Bell Records.

In 1975, Calder was appointed CEO of NEMS Records, where he signed Black Sabbath, Pluto and Marianne Faithfull. However he left this position soon after, and spent the following year setting old friend and fashion designer Ossie Clark back in business; licensing his designs and his name to forge a revival of Clark's image. In 1978, he turned his attention to managing Eddy Grant, whose international record career took off, and he subsequently helped with the formation and development of Grant's Ice Record label.

== 1980s and after ==
In 1982, Calder hired Bob Newby, a Music Publishing veteran [ex-Business Director of ATV Music] to manage the back office of Calder's businesses to allow him to mastermind Eddie Grant's successful 1982 Comeback Tour return including chart-topping 'I don't wanna dance' and 'Electric Avenue'. It was Bob Newby who originally introduced Calder to Grant who was a long-time personal friend of Grant. The relationship endend once the Tour completed. Calder formed the Big Wave Group in 1988, in partnership with Bill Kimber, and had worldwide success with Jive Bunny and the Mastermixers, who had three consecutive number 1 singles in the UK and throughout Europe and the Number 1 single in the US with "Swing the Mood".

In 1996, Calder co-wrote a biography of ABBA entitled Abba : The Name of the Game, with Andrew Oldham and Colin Irwin.

In November 2002 Calder formed the licensing company Plan B Audio Ltd which represented a catalogue of world-wide master recordings. In December 2007, Calder was re-hired by Eddy Grant as business manager after Calder negotiated on a new production deal for Grant's Ice label with Mercury Records.

== Personal life ==
His first marriage to Jennifer, one of the secretaries at Immediate, ended in divorce. In 1980 he married model Karen Richardson but they divorced after 10 years. Tony Calder died of complications from pneumonia on 2 January 2018, aged 74, at Chelsea & Westminster Hospital. He was survived by both children of his second marriage, daughter Georgie, son Anthony and also his stepdaughter, Harriet.

== Bibliography ==
- Larkin C Virgin Encyclopedia of Sixties Music (Muze UK Ltd, 1997) ISBN 0-7535-0149-X p. 90
