= Jon Mark =

English singer-songwriter and guitarist (1943–2021)

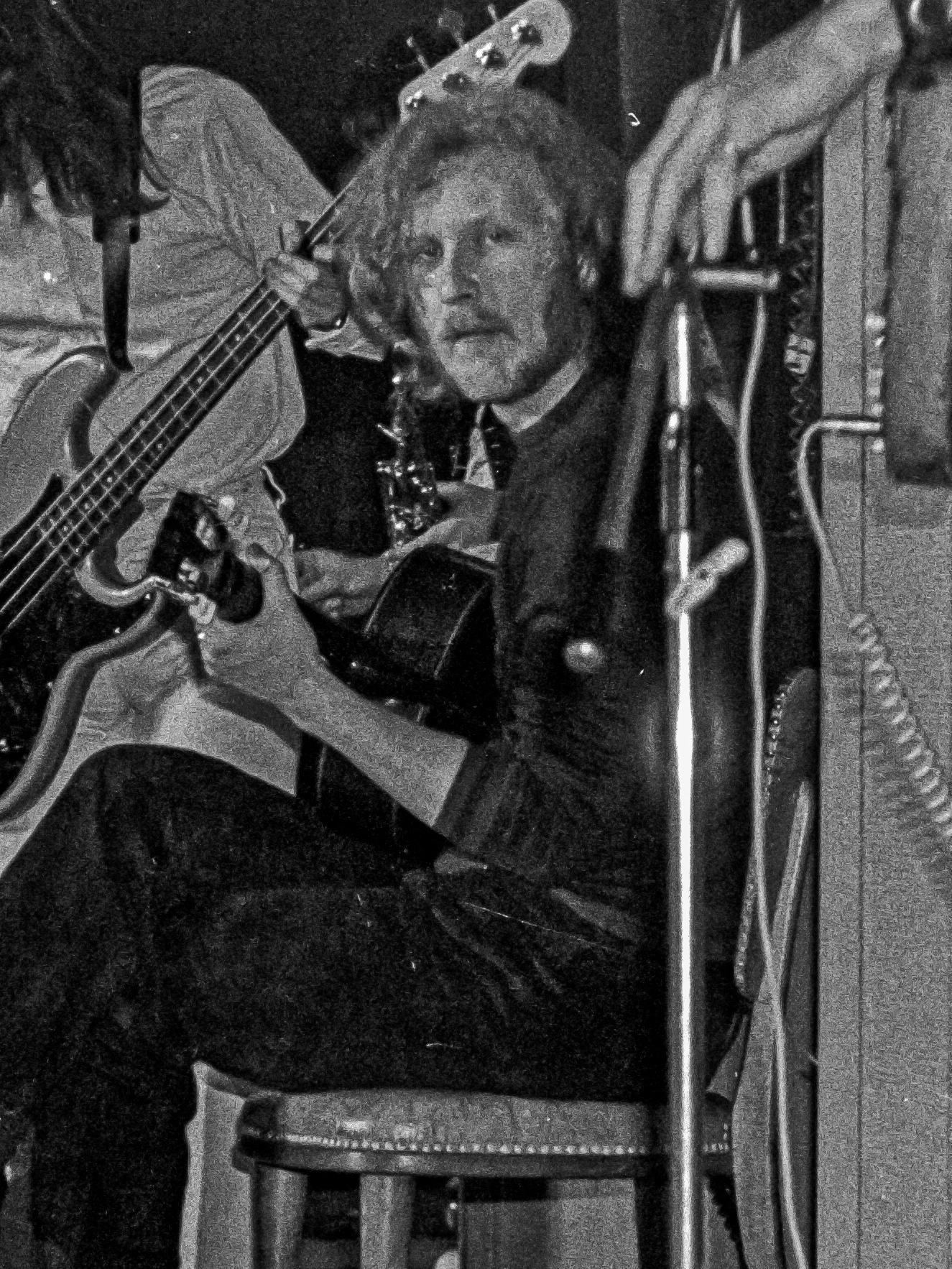
- Mark in Hanover in 1970

Background information
- Birth name: John Michael Burchell
- Born: 8 May 1943 Falmouth, Cornwall, England
- Died: 10 February 2021 (aged 77)
- Genres: Ambient; instrumental; blues
- Instruments: Guitar; vocals
- Years active: 1963–2008

John Michael Burchell (8 May 1943 – 10 February 2021), known professionally as Jon Mark, was an English singer-songwriter and guitarist, best known for his recordings with Marianne Faithfull, Sweet Thursday, John Mayall and Mark-Almond. Mark, who received a Grammy in 2004, lived in Rotorua, New Zealand.

== Biography ==
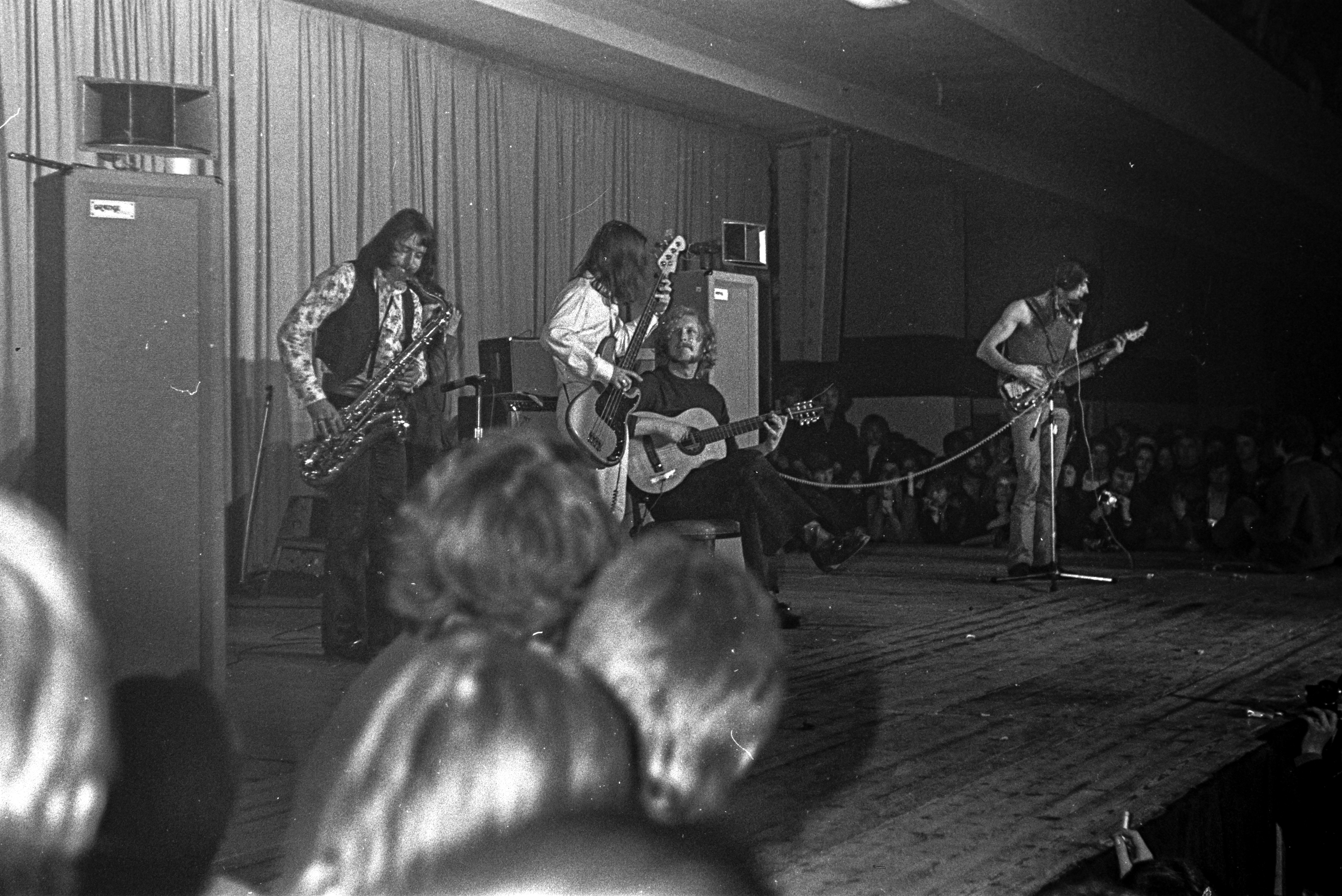
Jon Mark on acoustic guitar, Johnny Almond on saxophone, John Mayall on a Fender Telecaster guitar, Steve Thompson on bass, January 12, 1970 Niedersachsenhalle, Hannover

Jon Mark was born in Falmouth, Cornwall, England. Using his given name, he and a former schoolmate, Alun Davies; singer-songwriter, folk guitarist and skiffle musician, (later of Cat Stevens' band), recorded as a duo, an album entitled Relax Your Mind, on Decca Records. Both travelled extensively throughout the UK, and France, busking until they secured a job entertaining on a Cunard Line cruise ship.

From 1965 on Mark accompanied Marianne Faithfull on her recordings and concerts. Moreover he wrote and arranged some songs for her.

In 1968 Mark and Davies founded the short-lived five-piece band Sweet Thursday which was composed of Mark, Davies, Nicky Hopkins, Harvey Burns, and Brian Odgers. In December 1968 Tetragrammaton released a single which contained "Getting It Together" (Side A) and "Mary on the Runaround" (Side B) which were composed by Mark but were not included on the group's lone album, the eponymous Sweet Thursday on Fontana Records. However, the album was not promoted by their record label, and the bandmates never toured. Fontana later declared bankruptcy.

Hence Mark joined John Mayall's (post-Bluesbreakers) band with whom he toured and recorded The Turning Point (1969) and Empty Rooms (1969). There he met Johnny Almond with whom he decided to form Mark-Almond.

Mark-Almond's first two albums, Mark-Almond (1971) and Mark-Almond II (1972) were recorded for Bob Krasnow's Blue Thumb label, and were noted for their embossed envelope-style album covers. For the first album, The Ghetto received many plaudits and from the second "One Way Sunday" was a hit for them in the United States and received radio airplay on album-oriented rock stations in Boston, Massachusetts in 1970. The group then recorded two albums for Columbia Records, Rising (1972) and the live album, Mark-Almond 73 (1973), by which time the group's members had grown to seven.

In October 1972, Mark was involved in an accident in Hawaii and lost most of his left-hand ring finger. "What Am I Living For" from Mark-Almond 73 gained the group the most US radio airplay they would get, but nevertheless they disbanded later that year.

Mark released a solo record for Columbia Songs for a Friend in 1975. He and Almond reunited in 1975 and released the outstanding To the Heart on ABC Records (which had acquired Blue Thumb) in 1976, which featured the drummer Billy Cobham. Other notable musicians, who have recorded or toured with Mark-Almond include drummer Dannie Richmond, violinist Greg Bloch, keyboardist Tommy Eyre and bassist Roger Sutton. Eyre and Sutton later teamed in Riff Raff. A&M Records signed the duo in 1978 and released Other Peoples Rooms, but the record did not sell as well as earlier releases. Mark-Almond disbanded again in the mid 1980s, after releasing two decent albums, Tuesday in New York (1980) and a live offering The Last & Live (1981). In 1996 Mark-Almond reunited again for a CD release, Night Music, which featured keyboardist Mike Nock and others.

Mark moved to New Zealand in the mid 1980s, and released a number of successful solo Ambient music recordings on his White Cloud record label, as well as collaborating with other artists on traditional Celtic and folk recordings and producing other artists. A release of Tibetan Monk chants Mark recorded and produced with his wife Thelma Burchell won a Grammy Award in 2004.

On 29 December 2015, Jon Mark's wife, Thelma Burchell (born 20 November 1943) died. Mark died on 10 February 2021, at age 77.

== Discography ==
=== Early 45-records ===
- "Baby I Got A Long Way To Go" / "Night Comes Down" (Brunswick UK 05929, 19 February 1965).
- "Paris Bells" / "Little Town Girl" (Brunswick UK 05952, Feb 1966).
- "All Neat in Black Stockings" / "Run To Me" (Philips UK BF 1772, Apr 1969). From Robert Cornford's soundtrack for Christopher Morahan's All Neat in Black Stockings

=== Early albums ===
- Jon and Alun: Relax Your Mind (1963)
- Sweet Thursday: Sweet Thursday (1969)
- John Mayall: The Turning Point (1969)
- John Mayall: Empty Rooms (1969)
- Paul Williams & Friends: In Memory of Robert Johnson (1973)

=== Mark-Almond ===
- Mark-Almond (1971)
- Mark-Almond II (1972)
- Rising (1972)
- 73 (1973)
- To the Heart (1976)
- Other Peoples Rooms (1978)
- Tuesday in New York (1980)
- Last & Live (1981)
- Night Music (1996)

=== Solo work ===
- Sally Free And Easy (1965; released 2017)
- Songs for a Friend (1975)
- The Lady and the Artist (1983)
- The Standing Stones of Callanish (1988)
- Land of Merlin (1992)
- Alhambra (1992)
- Hot Night (1994)
- Celtic Story (1995)
- A Sunday in Autumn (1995)
- Asia Journey (1996)
- Solitary Journeys (1997)
- All The Best From Jon Mark (1997)
- Leaving of Ireland (1998) (with David Anthony Clark).
- Quiet Land of Erin (2003) (with Deirdre Starr)
- Meditation on Winter (2004)
- New York, New York - 24 hours in the Big Apple (ft. John Stanford & Nick van Dijk) (2008)
- Sand (ft. David Parsons) (2008)

=== Band member ===
- Marianne Faithfull: "Come My Way"
- Marianne Faithfull: "Live at the BBC"
- Mable Hillery: "It's So Hard To Be A Nigger" (1968) (Guitar)
- Ronnie Paisley Band: Smoking Mirrors
- Radha [Sahar] & The Kiwi Kids: Sing along with Teddy (as John Burchell, vocals) (2007)
