= Riff Raff (band) =

British progressive rock

Riff Raff was British progressive rock band formed in 1972, led by keyboardist Tommy Eyre.

== Background ==
The band was a continuation on the back of drummers (and Harrow School of Art friends) Rod Coombes' and Joe Czarnecki (aka Joe Peter)'s project originally called 'Crikey' which started in 1969 and completed in 1970, when Coombes had to accept growing tour commitments with Juicy Lucy. These sessions comprised half of the Riff Raff album Outside Looking In, in which Coombes wrote half the songs.

Riff Raff later went on to release two albums to lukewarm response; however, their use of jazz and hard-edged rock garnered them a large underground following. Riff Raff also released the single "Copper Kettle".

== Personnel ==
- Bud Beadle - saxophone
- Rod Coombes - drums, percussion and songwriter
- Joe Czarnecki aka Joe Peters - drums, percussion
- Aureo De Souza - drums
- Tommy Eyre - keyboards, vocals
- Pete Kirtley - guitar, vocals
- Roger Sutton - bass guitar, vocals
- Steve Gregory - woodwind
- Joanna Newman - vocals
- Joe O'Donnell - viola

== Discography ==
- Riff Raff (1973)
- Original Man (1974)
- Outside Looking In (1999)
