= Greg Rzab =

American bass guitar player (born 1959)

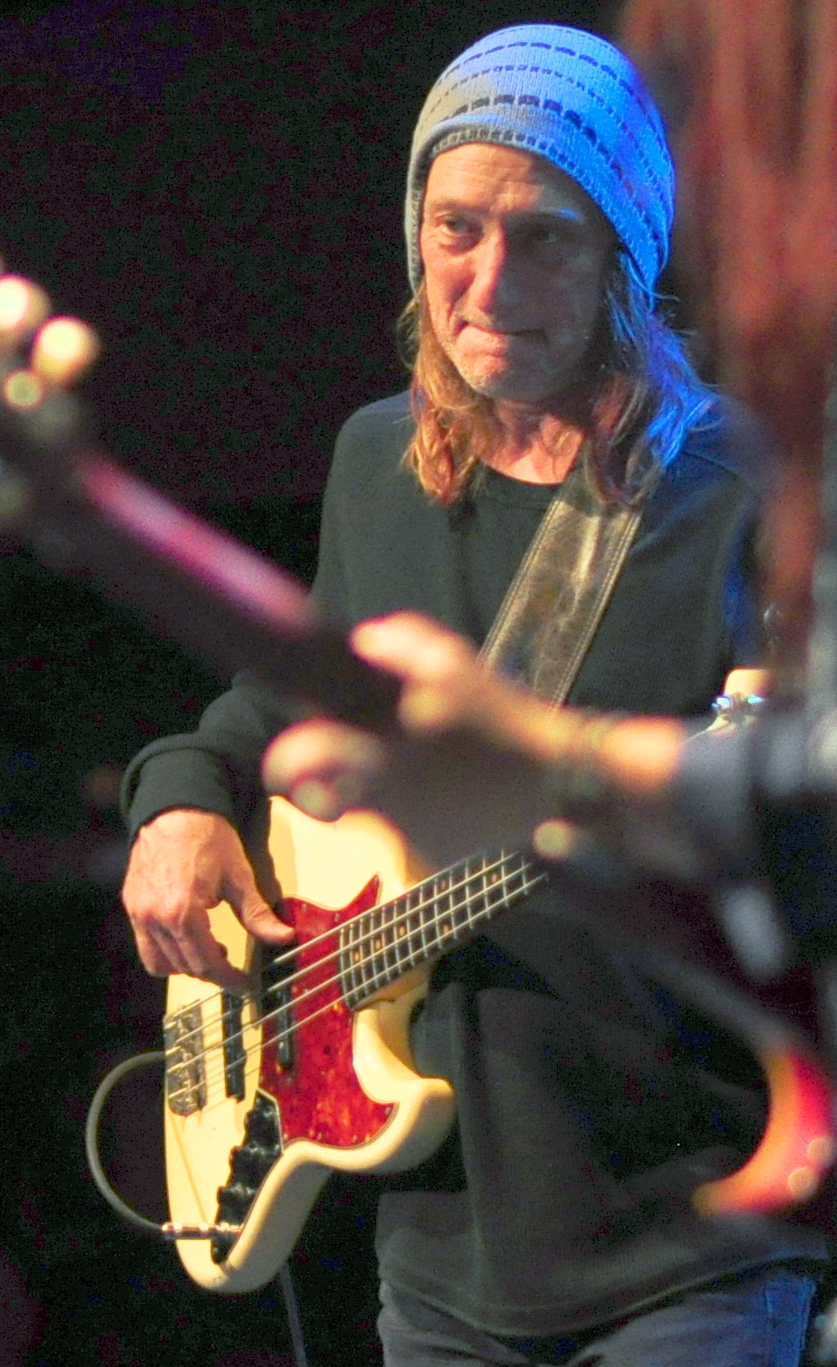
Rzab with John Mayall in 2019

Greg Rzab (/ˈɑːrˌzæb/ AR-zab; born 1959, Chicago, Illinois, United States) is an American bass guitar player.

Greg played for several years with Otis Rush's band, with Buddy Guy's band (1986-1998), and has also had a number of stints, tours, sessions, and records with other famous blues performers. In 2000, he was a member of the touring lineup of The Black Crowes and is featured on the bonus tracks of their 2000 album Live at the Greek with Jimmy Page. He was also a touring member of Gov't Mule for tours in late 2002 and early 2003.

Rzab joined John Mayall in the last lineup of John Mayall & the Bluesbreakers in 2009 and stayed until Mayall’s death in 2024.
