= Billy Squier discography =

- Studio albums: 9
- Live albums: 2
- Compilation albums: 7
- Singles: 24

The discography of American rock musician Billy Squier, which consists of nine studio albums, two live albums, seven compilation albums, and 24 singles.

== Albums ==
=== Studio albums ===
Title	Album details	Peak chart positions			Certifications (sales thresholds)
Title	Album details	US	AUS	CAN	Certifications (sales thresholds)
The Tale of the Tape	Released: May 1980; Label: Capitol / EMI	169	—	—	
Don't Say No	Released: April 13, 1981; Label: Capitol	5	34	4	RIAA: 3× Platinum; MC: Platinum
Emotions in Motion	Released: July 23, 1982; Label: Capitol	5	—	8	RIAA: 2× Platinum; MC: Platinum
Signs of Life	Released: July 1984; Label: Capitol	11	96	42	RIAA: Platinum; MC: Gold
Enough Is Enough	Released: September 27, 1986; Label: Capitol	61	—	—	
Hear & Now	Released: June 14, 1989; Label: Capitol	64	—	83	
Creatures of Habit	Released: April 9, 1991; Label: Capitol	117	—	—	
Tell the Truth	Released: April 27, 1993; Label: Capitol	—	—	—	
Happy Blue	Released: September 15, 1998; Label: J-Bird	—	—	—	
"—" denotes a recording that did not chart or was not released in that territory.

=== Compilation albums ===
- A Rock and Roll Christmas (various artists compilation) (1994)
- 16 Strokes: The Best of Billy Squier (1995)
- Reach for the Sky: The Anthology (1996) (PolyGram)
- Classic Masters (2002)
- Absolute Hits (2005)
- Essential Billy Squier (2011)
- Icon (2013)

=== Live albums ===
- King Biscuit Flower Hour Presents Billy Squier (1996)
- Live in the Dark (DVD)

== Singles ==
Year	Title	Peak chart positions				Album
Year	Title	US	US AOR	AUS	CAN	Album
1980	"You Should Be High Love"	—	x	—	—	The Tale of the Tape
1980	"The Big Beat"	—	x	—	—	The Tale of the Tape
1981	"The Stroke"	17	3	5	7	Don't Say No
1981	"In the Dark"	35	7	—	22	Don't Say No
1981	"Lonely Is the Night"	—	28	—	—	Don't Say No
1981	"My Kinda Lover"	45	31	64	—	Don't Say No
1982	"Everybody Wants You"	32	1	—	26	Emotions in Motion
1982	"Emotions in Motion"	68	20	—	13	Emotions in Motion
1982	"Learn How to Live"	—	15	—	—	Emotions in Motion
1982	"Keep Me Satisfied"	—	46	—	—	Emotions in Motion
1983	"She's a Runner"	75	44	—	—	Emotions in Motion
1984	"Rock Me Tonite"	15	1	50	31	Signs of Life
1984	"All Night Long"	75	10	—	—	Signs of Life
1984	"Can't Get Next to You"	—	51	—	—	Signs of Life
1984	"Eye on You"	71	29	—	—	Signs of Life
1986	"Love Is the Hero"	80	17	—	—	Enough Is Enough
1986	"Shot o' Love"	—	30	—	—	Enough Is Enough
1989	"Don't Say You Love Me"	58	4	—	—	Hear and Now
1989	"Tied Up"	—	20	—	—	Hear and Now
1989	"Don't Let Me Go"	—	38	—	—	Hear and Now
1991	"She Goes Down"	—	4	—	—	Creatures of Habit
1991	"Facts of Life"	—	37	—	—	Creatures of Habit
1993	"Angry"	—	15	—	—	Tell the Truth
2023	"Harder on a Woman"	—	—	—	—	single
"—" denotes a recording that did not chart or was not released in that territory.
