= Hear & Now (Billy Squier album) =

Studio album by Billy Squier
- Released: June 14, 1989
- Genres: Hard rock, AOR, pop rock
- Length: 43:34
- Label: Capitol
- Producers: Godfrey Diamond, Billy Squier, Jason Corsaro

Billy Squier chronology
Enough Is Enough (1986)	Hear & Now (1989)	Creatures of Habit (1991)

Singles from Hear & Now
- 1. "Don't Say You Love Me" Released: 1989; 2. "Don't Let Me Go" Released: 1989

Hear & Now is the sixth studio album by American rock musician Billy Squier, released on June 14, 1989. It features his last Billboard Hot 100 hit, "Don't Say You Love Me", as well as popular fan favorites and radio hits "Don't Let Me Go", "Stronger" and "Tied Up", the latter two being co-written with Desmond Child.

The disc's lead single, "Don't Say You Love Me", reached #4 on Billboard's Mainstream Rock Tracks and #58 on the Billboard Hot 100. Aided by a popular MTV music video, it became his best charting song since 1984's "Rock Me Tonite" and the last one to chart in Billboard Hot 100.

The album marked a return to Squier's rougher hard rock sound following his synth-heavy Signs of Life (1984) and polished Enough Is Enough (1986), with his arena rock slightly updated to late 1980s standards. In Billboard magazine, the album had the second best chart debut of Squier's career, at #71, but only reached #64. It registered at #59 on the Cash Box album index and sold approximately 300,000 copies.

Hear & Now was and still is regarded as one of Squier's better albums by his fanbase, with many of them calling it his best since 1981's Don't Say No.

== Track listing ==
All tracks are written by Billy Squier, except where noted.

No.	Title	Writer(s)	Length
1.	"Rock Out/Punch Somebody"		3:09
2.	"Stronger"	Squier, Desmond Child	4:02
3.	"Don't Say You Love Me"		4:28
4.	"Don't Let Me Go"		5:14
5.	"Tied Up"	Squier, Child	3:56
6.	"(I Put a) Spell on You"		4:32
7.	"G.O.D."		5:29
8.	"Mine Tonite"	Bobby Held, Jim Klein, additional lyrics by Squier	3:46
9.	"The Work Song"		3:56
10.	"Your Love Is My Life"		4:46
Total length:			43:34

Bonus track
No.	Title	Length
11.	"Too Much"	5:07
Total length:		48:42

- "Too Much" was recorded during the sessions, but wasn't included on the original album. It was originally issued as a b-side for "Don't Say You Love Me" and is nowadays available to purchase from Squier's website, either alone or as a part of Hear & Now.

== Personnel ==
- Billy Squier - lead vocals, lead, rhythm and acoustic guitars, backing vocals
- Bobby Chouinard - drums
- Anton Fig - drums on tracks 3,4,6 & 10
- John McCurry - guitars
- Jimmy Crespo - guitars
- Mark Clarke - bass
- Alan St. Jon - keyboards, synthesizers, backing vocals

=== Additional personnel ===
- Mars Williams - saxophone ("Stronger")
- Eric Wessberg - mandoline ("Don't Let Me Go")
- Rob Hardin - synthesizer, additional arrangements ("Mine Tonite")
- Godfrey Diamond and Steven Scales - miscellaneous percussion
- The Uptown Horns - horns ("The Work Song")
- Doug Lubahn - additional backing vocals
- Godfrey Diamond - "Keith couldn't make it" vocal ("Stronger")
- Curtis King, Tawatha Agee, Brenda White-King - backing vocals ("The Work Song")

== Charts ==
Chart (1989)	Peak position
Canada Top Albums/CDs (RPM)	83
US Billboard 200	64
