= Christmas Is the Time to Say 'I Love You' =

"Christmas is the Time to Say 'I Love You'"

Single by Billy Squier
- A-side: "Christmas Is the Time to Say 'I Love You'"
- B-side: "My Kinda Lover"
- Released: November 1981
- Genre: Rock, Christmas
- Length: 2:52
- Label: Capitol
- Songwriter: Billy Squier
- Producers: Reinhold Mack; Billy Squier

Billy Squier singles chronology
"My Kinda Lover" (1981)	"Christmas is the Time to Say 'I Love You'" (1981)	"Everybody Wants You" (1982)

"Christmas Is the Time to Say 'I Love You'" is a holiday rock song by Billy Squier, released in November 1981 as the B-side of his single "My Kinda Lover" (Capitol 5037). In 1981, a video of the song was recorded with MTV VJs and staff members singing along with a live performance by Squier. VJ Martha Quinn remembers it as her number one moment when working for MTV. A large number of the background singers and revelers was made up of New York and Philadelphia radio and record people, including Anita Gevinson from WMMR.

== Covers ==
The song has been covered by Darlene Love, Alexa Vega, and by SR-71. Katharine McPhee recorded a cover of the song on her Christmas album, Christmas is the Time to Say I Love You, which was released on October 12, 2010.
