= Emotion in Motion =

Emotion(s) in Motion may refer to:

- "Emotion in Motion" (song), a song by Ric Ocasek
- "Emotions in Motion", a song on the album of the same name by Billy Squier
- Emotions in Motion (Takayoshi Ohmura album)
- Emotions in Motion, an album by Rudy Linka
