= Bad Boys (1983 film) =

American film by Rick Rosenthal

- Theatrical release poster
- Directed by: Rick Rosenthal
- Written by: Richard DiLello
- Produced by: Robert H. Solo
- Starring: Sean Penn; Reni Santoni; Jim Moody; Esai Morales
- Cinematography: Bruce Surtees; Donald E. Thorin
- Edited by: Antony Gibbs
- Music by: Bill Conti
- Production companies: EMI Films; Solofilm Company
- Distributed by: Universal Pictures; Associated Film Distribution
- Release date: March 25, 1983
- Running time: 123 minutes; 104 minutes (Edited cut)
- Country: United States
- Language: English
- Budget: $5.2 million
- Box office: $9.2 million

Bad Boys is a 1983 American coming-of-age crime drama film set in a juvenile detention center, starring Sean Penn, Esai Morales, and Clancy Brown, Alan Ruck and Ally Sheedy in their film debuts. The film is directed by Rick Rosenthal. The original music score was composed by Bill Conti.

== Plot ==
Mick O'Brien is a 16-year-old Irish-American hoodlum from Chicago. Mick's crimes include snatching purses, shoplifting, vandalism, and fighting, but he aspires to bigger crimes. He subsequently attempts to rip off his Puerto Rican rival, Paco Moreno, but the plan goes awry, leading to Mick's best friend Carl Brennan being fatally shot and Mick accidentally running over and killing Paco's 8-year-old brother Pacito while making his getaway in a stolen car.

Mick is convicted and sent to Rainford Juvenile Correctional Facility. Most of the supervisors there have lowered themselves to the role of zookeepers; one exception is counselor Ramon Herrera, a former gang member. He talks tough to the inmates, but is confident that some of them, especially Mick, can turn their lives around.

Mick's cellmate is Barry Horowitz, a small, intelligent Jewish kid who firebombed a bowling alley after some boys there assaulted him for flirting with their girlfriends. Their cell block is dominated by a pair of brawny sadists named "Viking" Lofgren and Warren "Tweety" Jerome, who take an immediate dislike to Mick. Mick puts up with them at first, but after witnessing Tweety murdering Terrell, another inmate who attempted to stab Tweety in retaliation for raping him, he refuses to be intimidated.

Suspecting that Mick may have revealed Tweety's guilt to the authorities, Tweety and Viking go to Mick's cell to confront him about this. But Mick, having anticipated their arrival, outsmarts them by beating them up with a pillowcase full of unopened soda cans. This victory earns him the respect of the block and recognition as the new "barn boss." Tweety is paroled soon afterwards but is later killed during an attempted robbery at a liquor store.

In vengeance for Pacito's death, Paco attacks and rapes Mick's girlfriend, J.C. Walenski, but is caught and arrested. After learning this, Mick is overcome with the desire to see J.C., so he and Barry escape the double perimeter fences by using a corrosive paste that weakens the links enough to kick a hole through them. While running through the woods, Barry falls onto barbed wire and is caught by Gene Daniels and Wagner, two supervisors who are on their trail. This gives Mick time to get away, but Barry is subsequently beaten by Wagner for escaping and calling him names. Ramon rightfully believes that Mick will go to J.C.'s house and soon pick him up there. Before returning to Rainford, Ramon takes Mick to visit a maximum security prison, to show him where he could end up if he continues to live the life of a criminal. Warden Bendix decides to give Mick a second chance, threatening to add six months to his sentence if he tries to escape again.

After being convicted of the rape of J.C., Paco is sentenced to the same dormitory at Rainford as Mick. The staff are fully aware of this potential danger, but no other reform school has a vacancy. Paco attempts to provoke Mick into a fight, but Mick avoids the confrontation, since he may qualify for early release if he stays out of trouble. However, he also loses the respect of many of the inmates, who now want to see Paco put Mick away.

In an attempt to retaliate on Mick's behalf, Barry plants fertilizer in a radio he places in the cell that Viking and Paco share. The exploding charge injures Viking's face badly, and Barry is condemned to solitary confinement for the remainder of his sentence, a fate he fears more than any other.

Paco accidentally learns he is being transferred to another facility the next day, so he decides to kill Mick that night. While Ramon is on night watch, Paco fakes a ruptured appendix, knocks Ramon unconscious, and locks him in the office. Paco then goes to Mick's cell to stab him with a shiv; Mick gets the jump on Paco, however, and they start fighting. The other inmates are awakened by the brawl, and some barricade the dormitory door to prevent the authorities from interfering. Eventually, Mick gains the upper hand on Paco and prepares to deliver a fatal stab wound with the shiv while being encouraged by the others to kill. However, he resists at the last second, instead stabbing the floor mat next to Paco's head. Mick then drags a beaten Paco to the supervisors and heads back to his cell, crying remorsefully beneath his breath.

== Cast ==
- Sean Penn as Mick O'Brien
- Reni Santoni as Ramon Herrera
- Jim Moody as Gene Daniels
- Eric Gurry as Barry Horowitz
- Ally Sheedy as J.C. Walenski
- Clancy Brown as "Viking" Lofgren
- Robert Lee Rush as Warren "Tweety" Jerome
- Esai Morales as Paco Moreno
- John Zenda as Supervisor Wagner
- Alan Ruck as Carl Brennan
- Tony Mockus as Warden Bendix
- Erik Barefield as Terrell
- Marco A. David as Pacito Moreno
- Rick Rosenthal as Judge
- Jason Gedrick as Inmate
- Harry Lennix as Inmate

== Production ==
=== Development ===
The idea for the film came from producer Robert Solo who told writer Richard Di Lello he was looking for "a Jimmy Cagney story set in a modern day reform school." Di Lello produced a ten-page treatment which Solo liked and was approved to write a screenplay. Di Lello spent about a year writing the screenplay which he says later mostly came from his imagination, with minimal research; he later did research and found it corresponded with what he had written. "My imagination turned out to be far more accurate than I ever anticipated," he said.

Solo hired Rick Rosenthal to direct on the basis of a 30 minute short Rosenthal had made, The Toyer. Rosenthal later said when he first read the script, "I got to page 90, when there'd been a little kid killed, and I said to myself, 'This is reality, but I can't do this, there's just no redeeming value in the whole thing.'... I got to the end. I accepted. Some script changes were made - I think the script was humanized. It's still a hard film, a tough film, but with soul underneath, and I think with social comment that doesn't hit you on the head."

Rosenthal said the idea "was that we were going to make something that was really a B-movie, somewhat like those edgy Warner Bros movies from the forties or fifties. It would have some of that texture: Reform School Teens Behind Bars. Rebel Without a Cause certainly came to mind as one of the potential prototypes — not as a take on that movie, more the genre and the style."

The script was violent but the filmmakers felt this was necessary to tell the story accurately. "I'm a commercial filmmaker first and foremost," said Solo. "This movie is about young people and the youth audience is the primary one. I simply wanted Bad Boys to have a tremendous reality. How do you tell this story without violence? If you don't, you're saying violence doesn't exist."

Finance was obtained from Britain's EMI Films although Universal distributed in the US.

=== Casting ===
Rick Rosenthal says Matt Dillon wanted to play the lead role of Mick O'Brien, but the director was reluctant. He cast Sean Penn (aged 22 at the time of filming) on the basis of a reading. "Although I'm crazy about Matt Dillon as an actor, I thought he'd already done the role in My Bodyguard," said Rosenthal. "I was also afraid that the audience might be conscious of a new movie star, where with Penn they'd only be conscious of Mick." The director said Penn is "a very good actor, obsessively so. He went into character for the whole shoot and stayed there, had a real wolf's head tattooed on his arm, checked into hotels as Mick, the whole thing." As part of their research for the film, Rosenthal and Penn visited St Charles, a reform school in Chicago. Penn later said he "didn't get to know enough" from his time at the school, adding "I wanted to a lot more time and lot more support in bringing something to that movie."

Rosenthal said Tom Cruise auditioned and was "phenomenal" but the director could not see someone with his looks "from the streets".

The film was Ally Sheedy's first role in a feature. "Rick really took a chance on me, he really did," she said.

=== Shooting ===
While filming the escape scene, Sean Penn broke an ankle which halted shooting for three months.

The film unit spent six days filming in St. Charles, Illinois, a suburb west of Chicago. They employed about forty residents as extras.

Penn later expressed dissatisfaction with the film and the process of making it, saying he clashed with Rosenthal. He felt the film "lied that that’s the nature of the street. We didn’t lie about the truth of the character in other ways, but culturally we did." Penn claimed they would do two takes, one based on the script, and another "where I could let myself go in what I had observed, which I thought had a poetry way beyond what we did" but he said "Rick Rosenthal would not trust it." He said he was "not pleased with the picture, not pleased with my performance. But I was pleased with the performance that I gave that was not on the screen."

== Release ==
=== Distribution ===
Universal Studios originally released Bad Boys in 1983, and Thorn/EMI released it on the Beta and VHS videocassette formats later that year, but in 1999 Artisan Entertainment took the rights and released the DVD. With the exceptions of the original videocassette release and a laser videodisc reissue by HBO Video in 1990, most releases used an edited 104-minute version until 2001, when Anchor Bay Entertainment took its DVD rights and re-released it, and in 2007 Facets Multimedia Distribution re-released it on DVD. Bad Boys was released on Blu-ray by Lionsgate Home Entertainment for the first time on February 1, 2011, presented "complete and uncut." It is also available for online streaming video rentals and digital download purchases through Amazon Prime Video and Apple iTunes Store.

=== Critical reception ===
Bad Boys garnered generally positive reviews; review aggregate website Rotten Tomatoes currently holds a 90% "Fresh" rating based on 20 reviews. Metacritic, which uses a weighted average, assigned the film a score of 53 out of 100, based on 10 critics, indicating "mixed or average" reviews. David Denby of The New Yorker magazine argued, "Bad Boys is never less than tense and exciting, but it's coarse and grisly, an essentially demagogic piece of work".

In his original review, Roger Ebert praised the direction and cinematography in particular and wrote, "The direction, by Richard Rosenthal, is sure-footed, confident and fluid; we are in the hands of a fine director". In her review for The New York Times, Janet Maslin wrote, "Sean Penn's performance is the chief thing that separates Bad Boys from mere exploitation". Perry Seibert of All Media Guide said "Bad Boys proves that great performances can overcome routine story lines."

Rosenthal later said "I think I turned down around 20 or 22 films after Bad Boys. The phone rang all the time. The funny thing is, at the time I didn't know I was hot. But after American Dreamer, I knew the difference." In 2002 the director said Bad Boys and American Dreamer are the favorite movies that he directed.

Following the release of the film, Rolling Stone magazine put Sean Penn on its cover with the title "Bad Boy: the new James Dean."

== Soundtrack ==
The soundtrack of the film comprised some late, eccentric funk tracks, as well as Billy Squier and Iron Maiden.

- "Get Dressed" by George Clinton
- "Superstar" by T-Connection
- "Tonight's the Night" by T-Connection
- "Too Hot to Be Cool" by Ebonee Webb
- "Everybody Wants You" by Billy Squier
- "In the Dark" by Billy Squier
- "Mr. Hate" by The Tubes
- "Check Us Out" by Light of the World
- "Street Corner" by Ashford & Simpson
- "One More Time" by McFadden & Whitehead
- "Give Me Your Love" by Peabo Bryson
- "Prodigal Son" by Iron Maiden
- "Purgatory" by Iron Maiden
- "Don't Go Away" by Melba Moore
- "Night Owls" by Little River Band
- "Man on Your Mind" by Little River Band
- "Crime Wave" by Prism
- "Run to Her" by Jennifer Warnes
- "Pelo de Alambre" by Bobby Capó
- "Guillermo y Maria" by Bobby Capó

== Cultural usage ==
The name of the Croatian ultras group Bad Blue Boys (who support GNK Dinamo Zagreb) is said to have been inspired by Bad Boys.

== Notes ==
- Kelly, Richard (2004). Sean Penn : his life and times. Canongate.
