= I want my MTV =

I Want My MTV may refer to:

- The original slogan of the television channel, MTV
- A line in the Dire Straits song, "Money for Nothing", which reiterates the MTV slogan
- I Want My MTV: The Uncensored Story of the Music Video Revolution, a 2011 book
