= She Goes Down =

She Goes Down may refer to:

- "She Goes Down", a song by Billy Squier from the album Creatures of Habit
- "She Goes Down", a song by Gotthard from the album Dial Hard
- "She Goes Down", a song by Mötley Crüe from the album Dr. Feelgood
