= Everybody Wants You =

Single by Billy Squier

from the album Emotions in Motion
- B-side: "Keep Me Satisfied"; "Learn How to Live" (only in Japan)
- Released: September 14, 1982
- Genre: Hard rock
- Length: 3:46
- Label: Capitol
- Songwriter: Billy Squier
- Producers: Reinhold Mack; Billy Squier

Billy Squier singles chronology
"Emotions in Motion" (1982)	"Everybody Wants You" (1982)	"She's a Runner" (1983)

Music video
- "Everybody Wants You" on YouTube

"Everybody Wants You" is a hit song written and performed by American rock singer and guitarist Billy Squier. It appeared as the opening track of his multi-Platinum 1982 album Emotions in Motion, and was released as the second single (following the title track) from that album, reaching #31 on the Cash Box Top 100 and #32 on the Billboard Hot 100 chart. It became, however, a much bigger hit on AOR (Album Oriented Rock) radio, gridlocking the top spot of Mainstream Rock charts for six weeks straight. The song's music video also remained in heavy rotation for months on MTV.

== Details ==
The song features three guitars and a bass playing a "hard-rocking and funky" riff, and a "sleekly new wave-oriented production". It became a huge hit on both radio and MTV, topping the Billboard Mainstream Rock Tracks charts for six weeks, from August 28 to October 8, 1982. It was also on the pop charts, debuting on the Billboard Top 40 on November 27, 1982 and peaking at number 32. It was Squier's third Top 40 song, following "The Stroke" (number 17) and "In the Dark" (number 35).

"Everybody Wants You" is included on Squier's 1995 greatest hits collection 16 Strokes: The Best of Billy Squier.

"Everybody Wants You" is one of the songs Squier has performed live with Ringo Starr & His All-Starr Band; one version appeared on the Ringo Starr & His All Starr Band Live 2006 album, along with Squier's 1984 hit "Rock Me Tonite".

== Chart history ==
Chart (1982)	Peak position
US Billboard Hot 100	32
US Billboard Top Rock Tracks	1
Canadian RPM Top Singles	26
South Africa (Springbok)	13

== Covers ==
The song has been covered by artists such as the American hard rock bands Puddle of Mudd, Damone and The Unband, whose version appeared on the soundtrack to the 2000 film Scary Movie.

Canadian indie rock band Tokyo Police Club performed a version of the song in August 2010 for the first season of The A.V. Club's A.V. Undercover web series.

== In popular culture ==
The song was used as The Fabulous Ones' (Steve Keirn and Stan Lane) entrance theme during their time in the Memphis-based Continental Wrestling Association from 1982 to 1985.

The 1983 film Bad Boys uses it in the start of the movie where Sean Penn sits in his room strumming guitar with the song playing on his radio, his mother tells him to turn it down and he just turns up the volume.

The song was used in episode 13 "Standards and Practices" of season 1 of the drama The Closer.

In 2004, a mashup of "Everybody Wants You" and "Emerge" by Fischerspooner was included on the Queer Eye soundtrack.

The song is used in the first several seasons of the TV show Burn Notice, including being used in a promotional ad for the second season.

The song is used in the 2012 film Battleship.

Top 40 DJ Mark Sebastian once played the song repeatedly for over an hour on Cincinnati radio station WKRQ, claiming to have locked himself in the studio and hearing people banging on the door to get him out. He was temporarily suspended and returned to air after reading an apology.

== See also ==
- List of Billboard Mainstream Rock number-one songs of the 1980s
