= Creature of Habit =

Creature of Habit may refer to:

- one who is extremely used to their own habits and does not function well without them
- Creatures of Habit (Buffy comic), trade paperback collecting comic stories based on the Buffy television series
- "Creature of Habit", song by Bug Hunter from their 2020 album Bigger Than Myself
- "Creatures of Habit", song by Deicide from their 1997 album Serpents of the Light
- "Creatures of Habit", song by Soul Asylum from their 1998 album Candy from a Stranger
- Creatures of Habit (album), a 1991 album by Billy Squier
- Creature of Habit (album), a 2026 album by Courtney Barnett
