= Emotions in Motion (song) =

Single by Billy Squier

from the album Emotions in Motion
- B-side: "Catch 22" (America); "It Keeps You Rockin'" (international)
- Released: July 1982
- Recorded: January 1982
- Genre: Hard rock; funk rock
- Length: 4:58
- Label: Capitol
- Songwriter: Billy Squier
- Producers: Reinhold Mack; Billy Squier

Billy Squier singles chronology
| "My Kinda Lover" (1981) | "Emotions in Motion" (1982) | "Everybody Wants You" (1982) |

"Emotions in Motion" is a 1982 single by American rock musician Billy Squier, which was featured on his platinum selling album of the same name and released as the first single from it. The song is notable for featuring Queen members Freddie Mercury and Roger Taylor on backing vocals. The former would later collaborate again with Squier, on his 1986 single "Love Is the Hero".

At the time of its release, "Emotions in Motion" received only modest chart success in the US and was later overshadowed by his next single "Everybody Wants You", which became a significantly bigger hit. The single fared better in Canada and remains his second-best charting song there right after "The Stroke".

The B-sides, "Catch 22" and "It Keeps You Rockin'", are also taken from the album Emotions in Motion.

== Composition ==
Musically, the sexually-driven "Emotions in Motion" shares a lot of similarities with some of the songs from Queen's Hot Space (which was being recorded at the same time as the song), as well as their 1980 track "Dragon Attack". It is built around a simplistic and groovy drum beat and a prominent funk-influenced bass line played by Bobby Chouinard and Doug Lubahn, respectively.

Billboard described it as a "sultry hard rock mood piece, reminiscent of Led Zeppelin and Queen."

== Music video ==
The song's music video, which was shot at the same location as "Everybody Wants You" and just like Squier's others, is mostly a performance piece and received heavy rotation on MTV. Halfway through, it features a brief scene featuring him showcasing a stripper-style pole dance.

== Charts ==
| Chart (1982) | Peak position | Source |
|---|---|---|
| Canada RPM Top Singles | 13 | |
| US Billboard Hot 100 | 68 | |
| US Billboard Mainstream Rock Songs | 20 | |
| US Cash Box Top 100 | 61 | |

== Personnel ==
- Billy Squier - lead vocals, rhythm guitar
- Jeff Golub - lead guitar
- Alan St. Jon - keyboards
- Doug Lubahn - bass
- Bobby Chouinard - drums
- Dino Solera - saxophone
- Freddie Mercury - backing vocals
- Roger Taylor - backing vocals
