= Jim Moody (actor) =

American actor

- Born: James Moody; September 25, 1949 (age 75); Portsmouth, Virginia, U.S.
- Education: Juilliard School (BFA)
- Occupation: Actor
- Years active: 1980–present

James Moody (born September 25, 1949) is an American television and film character actor. He played the tough-talking counselor/teacher Gene Daniels in Bad Boys. His first feature film role was in the 1980 hit film Fame, in which he played Mr. Farrell, a drama teacher. Moody starred in the 1983 comedy film D.C. Cab as Arnie, a member of the rival cab company, Emerald Cab. He also appeared in the 1999 drama The Best Man and as Leroy Greene, Sr. (the father) in The Last Dragon.

Moody has made some guest appearances on television shows like Law & Order. He appeared in a few episodes of that TV series, in each episode playing a different character. Moody's other appearances were Law & Order: Special Victims Unit, Law & Order: Criminal Intent, Third Watch, and New York Undercover.

Moody hails from Portsmouth, Virginia. He was a drama teacher at the LaGuardia High School of the Performing Arts and the subsequent LaGuardia High School of Music and Arts and the Performing Arts, with Adrien Brody among his more famous students. He is now a private drama coach and working actor based in New York.

== Partial filmography ==
- Fame (1980) - Mr. Farrell
- First Family (1980) - Justice Haden
- Personal Best (1982) - Roscoe Travis
- Fighting Back (1982) - Lester Baldwin
- Bad Boys (1983) - Gene Daniels
- D.C. Cab (1983) - Arnie
- The Last Dragon (1985) - Daddy Green
- Lean on Me (1989) - Mr. Lott
- Le Grand Pardon II (1992) - Danny Williams
- Who's the Man? (1993) - Nick Crawford
- Night Falls on Manhattan (1996) - Mayor Williams
- Midnight in the Garden of Good and Evil (1997) - Mr. Glover (uncredited)
- Celebrity (1998) - Security Guard
- The Best Man (1999) - Uncle Skeeter
- 28 Days (2000) - Chauffeur
- Law & Order: Special Victims Unit (2005) - Support Group Therapist (Episode: "Demons")
