= Love Is the Hero =

1986 single by Billy Squier

Single by Billy Squier with Freddie Mercury

from the album Enough Is Enough
- B-side: "Learn How to Live" (live)
- Released: October 1986
- Genre: AOR, pop rock
- Length: 4:48 (single and album version); 5:22 (12" version)
- Label: Capitol
- Songwriter: Billy Squier
- Producer: Peter Collins

Billy Squier singles chronology
"Eye on You" (1984)	"Love Is the Hero" (1986)	"Don't Say You Love Me" (1989)

"Love Is the Hero" is a song performed by American Rock singer and guitarist Billy Squier, with Freddie Mercury from Queen on backing vocals. It appears as the second track on his fifth studio album Enough Is Enough from 1986.

After a very poorly received video for his hit song "Rock Me Tonite", Squier's career had taken a downturn. As a result, he stopped selling out concerts and his album and singles success waned. "Love Is the Hero" became a commercial disappointment, peaking at #65 in Cash Box magazine and #80 on the Billboard Hot 100 chart. It fared much better on AOR (Album Oriented Rock) radio and received rotation on MTV. It is often deemed one of the best songs from his later career and the standout track of Enough Is Enough.

Mercury originally recorded an intro sung solely by himself, but it was cut from the album and single version. It was kept on the extended 12" version and later restored on Squier's compilation album Reach For the Sky: The Anthology and Mercury's The Solo Collection box set. In the spring of 2021, the aforementioned version was finally released as a digital single.

== Personnel ==
- Billy Squier - lead vocals, guitars, keyboards
- Freddie Mercury - backing vocals, co-lead vocals, piano (12" version only)
- Bobby Chouinard - drums
- Alan St. Jon - keyboards
- Jeff Golub - guitars
- TM Stevens - bass
