= I Luv U (Dizzee Rascal song) =

Single by Dizzee Rascal

from the album Boy in da Corner
- B-side: "Vexed"
- Written: Late 2001
- Released: 26 May 2003
- Recorded: 2002
- Studio: Belly of the Beast (London, England)
- Genre: Grime
- Length: 4:05
- Label: XL; Dirtee Stank
- Songwriter: Dylan Mills
- Producer: Dizzee Rascal

Dizzee Rascal singles chronology
"I Luv U" (2003)	"Fix Up, Look Sharp" (2003)

Remix cover

Music video
- "Dizzee Rascal - 'I Luv U'" on YouTube

"I Luv U" is the debut single by British rapper Dizzee Rascal from his debut studio album Boy in da Corner (2003). It was released by XL Recordings on 26 May 2003 as the lead single from the album, and first gained underground attention in 2002 after a test pressing had made rounds on UK pirate radio.

The song peaked at number 29 on the UK Singles Chart, becoming Dizzee Rascal's first top 40 hit in the United Kingdom. "I Luv U" received widespread acclaim from critics, and is retrospectively considered one of the most important songs in the development and mainstream breakthrough of grime music. It was also the only single of his to be released before his July 2003 stabbing in Cyprus, in which he almost died.

== Background and composition ==
I know I was in the middle of making it and Cage was on the phone. He got off the phone and he said: "Ah, it's not good." I said: "What's wrong?". He said: "It's not good." Then, he explained to me that the towers fell, and bin Laden, 9/11, and all that stuff. I didn't understand, 'cause I'd never heard of the Twin Towers; I didn't know what any of that was. But I remember that vividly happened when I was making this beat.

After dropping out of college, Dizzee Rascal independently self-produced "I Luv U" around late 2001, at the age of 16. The instrumental was created in roughly 30 minutes. Dizzee credits American hip-hop and crunk pioneers like Three 6 Mafia as major influences on the song, and was inspired in particular by the male-female back and forth structures of Ludacris and Shawnna's "What's Your Fantasy", and the Timbaland-produced "Is That Your Chick?", the former of which was Dizzee's attempt of replicating the strings to.

The song features additional vocals from Jeanine Jacques, who portrays the girl on the chorus. She was a local girl from Dizzee's estate who he didn't get along with, but sought her nonetheless because he needed a female rapper on the song and didn't know any professional ones. Jacques asked "what the fuck is this...?" when she first heard the production she was tasked with rapping over. The song opens with a stuttering voice repeating the song's title, leading into a bass-heavy rhythm.

== Critical reception ==
"I Luv U" received widespread critical acclaim upon its release. Drowned in Sound gave the song a perfect 10/10 rating in their review, as well as proclaiming it as "single of the goddamn year" and championing Dizzee as "the saviour of UK music". Pitchfork was also highly positive of the record, ranking "I Luv U" at number 7 in their list of the best songs of 2003 and calling it a "contemptuous smackfest" with its "grim and hateful lyrics". They also placed the song at number 56 in their 2009 ranking of the "200 Best Songs of the 2000s". AllMusic highlighted the song as a standout track from Boy in da Corner.

The Wire described "I Luv U"'s impact on grime as "analogous to "Anarchy in the U.K." for punk rock." The track was named as one of the best songs released between 2000 and 2003 in the 2008 book The Pitchfork 500: Our Guide to the Greatest Songs from Punk to the Present. XL Recordings owner Richard Russell wrote in his 2020 book Liberation Through Hearing that the first time he heard "I Luv U", he felt "Dizzee was creating what could clearly be an entirely new day for British music."

Tom Ewing of Freaky Trigger described "I Luv U" as "a bomb-burst of noise, invention, attitude and spite – people who'd been following the underground evolution of grime for years were shocked by how new, how hard, how fully realised it sounded." Kieran Yates of Resident Advisor writes, "Most people of a certain age will remember where they were when they first heard Dizzee Rascal's riotous 'I Luv U'—some in the schoolyard, others in a sticky rave."

== Commercial performance ==
"I Luv U" instantly became a top 40 hit in the United Kingdom, debuting at number 29 on the UK Singles Chart on 7 June 2003 and staying in the top 100 for three weeks. The song also peaked at number 2 on the UK Dance Singles Chart for two consecutive weeks, and at number 5 on the UK Independent Singles Chart.

Additionally, "I Luv U" would re-enter the UK Dance Singles Chart for one week on 11 April 2009.

== Track listing ==
UK CD single

1. "I Luv U" (clean radio edit) – 2:36
2. "I Luv U" (Remix) (featuring Wiley and Sharkey Major) – 4:25
3. "I Luv U" (Original Mix) – 4:05

UK 12-inch vinyl

1. "I Luv U" (Original Mix) – 4:05
2. "I Luv U" (Dirty Radio Edit) – 2:33
3. "Vexed" – 4:12

UK remix 12-inch vinyl

1. "I Luv U" (Remix) (featuring Wiley and Sharkey Major) – 4:25
2. "I Luv U" (Clean Radio Edit) – 2:36
3. "I Luv U" (instrumental) – 4:08

US promotional mini CD

1. "Fix Up, Look Sharp" – 3:45
2. "I Luv U" – 4:04

== Charts ==
Weekly chart performance for "I Luv U"
Chart (2003)	Peak position
UK Singles (Official Charts)	29
UK Dance (Official Charts)	2
UK Indie (Official Charts)	5

2009 weekly chart performance for "I Luv U"
Chart (2009)	Peak position
UK Dance (Official Charts)	34

== Release history ==
Release dates and formats for "I Luv U"
Region	Date	Format(s)	Label(s)	Ref.
United Kingdom	2002	White label record	Self-released	
United Kingdom	26 May 2003	12-inch vinyl; CD; maxi CD	XL	
United Kingdom	26 May 2003	Digital download	XL	
United Kingdom	June 2003 (Note: The remix version of "I Luv U" also received a standalone physical release.)	12-inch vinyl	XL	
United States	20 January 2004 (Note: In the United States, "I Luv U" was released as a double A-side promotional CD with "Fix Up, Look Sharp".)	Mini CD	XL; Matador	
