= Fix Up, Look Sharp =

Single by Dizzee Rascal

from the album Boy in da Corner
- B-side: "Stop Dat"
- Released: 18 August 2003
- Studio: Belly of the Beast, Raskits Lair (London, England)
- Genre: Rap rock
- Length: 3:44
- Label: XL
- Songwriters: Dylan Mills; Nick Detnon; Billy Squier
- Producer: Dizzee Rascal

Dizzee Rascal singles chronology
"I Luv U" (2003)	"Fix Up, Look Sharp" (2003)	"Lucky Star" (2003)

Music video
- "Fix Up, Look Sharp" on YouTube

"Fix Up, Look Sharp" is a song by British rapper Dizzee Rascal from his debut studio album Boy in da Corner (2003). It was released as the second single from the album on 18 August 2003 by XL Recordings, following "I Luv U". The song was written and produced by Dizzee Rascal and samples the instrumental and vocals from "The Big Beat" by American rock musician Billy Squier. It is widely considered one of the most popular and prominent usages of the classic song.

"Fix Up, Look Sharp" was the most commercially successful single from Boy in da Corner, peaking at number 17 on the UK Singles Chart and was later certified Gold by the British Phonographic Industry (BPI). It received significant acclaim from critics for its innovative production, and is viewed as a standout track from Boy in da Corner. In October 2011, NME placed it at number 25 on its "150 Best Tracks of the Past 15 Years".

== Commercial performance ==
"Fix Up, Look Sharp" debuted at number 17 on the UK Singles Chart on 30 August 2003, which made it Dizzee Rascal's first song to crack the top 20 in the United Kingdom. This was higher than Dizzee's debut single "I Luv U", which debuted at number 29. The song spent a total of five weeks in the top 100 during its initial run. "Fix Up, Look Sharp" would re-enter the UK Singles Chart for an additional week on 23 May 2009, charting at number 78 on downloads alone. The re-entry was fuelled by massive hype surrounding Dizzee Rascal at the time, specifically the release of his smash hit single "Bonkers", which went to number 1 that same month.

The track also reached number 5 on the UK Hip Hop and R&B Singles Chart and number 3 on the UK Independent Singles Chart. On 3 January 2025, "Fix Up, Look Sharp" was certified Gold by the British Phonographic Industry (BPI) for exceeding sales of 400,000 certified units in the United Kingdom.

== Music video ==
The song's music video was directed by Ruben Fleischer.

== Track listing ==
Digital download

1. "Fix Up, Look Sharp" (radio edit) – 3:16
2. "Stop Dat" – 3:40

UK CD single

1. "Fix Up, Look Sharp" (radio edit) – 3:16
2. "Stop Dat" – 3:40
3. "I Luv U" (video) – 3:32

UK 12-inch vinyl

1. "Fix Up, Look Sharp" – 3:44
2. "Fix Up, Look Sharp" (radio edit) – 3:16
3. "Fix Up, Look Sharp" (instrumental) – 3:44

UK 12-inch remix vinyl

1. "Fix Up, Look Sharp" (Remix) (featuring Wiley) – 3:28
2. "Stop Dat" – 3:40
3. "Stop Dat" (instrumental) – 3:40

US promotional mini CD

1. "Fix Up, Look Sharp" – 3:45
2. "I Luv U" – 4:04

== Charts ==
Weekly chart performance for "Fix Up, Look Sharp"
Chart (2003)	Peak position
UK Singles (Official Charts)	17
UK Hip Hop/R&B (Official Charts)	5
UK Indie (Official Charts)	3

2009 weekly chart performance for "Fix Up, Look Sharp"
Chart (2009)	Peak position
UK Singles (Official Charts)	78
UK Indie (Official Charts)	20

== Certifications ==
Certifications and sales for "Fix Up, Look Sharp"
Region	Certification	Certified units/sales
United Kingdom (BPI)	Gold	400,000^{‡}
^{‡} Sales+streaming figures based on certification alone.

== Release history ==
Release dates and formats for "Fix Up, Look Sharp"
Region	Date	Format(s)	Label(s)	Ref.
United Kingdom	18 August 2003	12-inch vinyl (Note: The remix version of "Fix Up, Look Sharp" also received a standalone vinyl release.); CD; maxi CD	XL	
United Kingdom	25 August 2003	Digital download	XL	
United States	20 January 2004 (Note: In the United States, "Fix Up, Look Sharp" was released as a double A-side promotional CD with "I Luv U".)	Mini CD	XL; Matador	
