= Doug Lubahn =

American musician (1947–2019)

- Born: December 20, 1947
- Died: November 20, 2019 (aged 71)
- Genres: Psychedelic rock, Rock, Jazz, Jazz fusion
- Occupation: Musician
- Instrument: Bass guitar
- Years active: 1966–1981
- Labels: Elektra, Columbia

Douglas Lubahn (December 20, 1947 – November 20, 2019) was an American bass guitarist in psychedelic rock and jazz rock who played with internationally famous bands. His work is featured on three albums by the Doors.

== Musical career ==
In 1965, Lubahn was working in a ski resort in Aspen, Colorado, United States, as a ski instructor, when he ran across Cass Elliot, who was with a group called The Candy Store. As Lubahn and Elliot got to know each other, she encouraged Lubahn to travel to Los Angeles, California, to try to find a band there, because at the time many bands were in need of bassists.

=== Clear Light ===
In Los Angeles, 1966, Lubahn was a founding member of the band Clear Light. Clear Light was the only album the band created before they split up. Their best-known song, "Mr. Blue" (composed by folk singer Tom Paxton), has been referred to as "long and a bit overbaked, but it does have an odd appeal". A review by Matthew Greenwald stated that they "combined folk, rock, psychedelia, and even a touch of classical to their sound", continuing on to say that "the end result, though, is a little ponderous and pretentious, but strangely listenable".

=== The Doors ===
One day, Clear Light's producer, Paul Rothchild, asked Lubahn to work on sessions for The Doors' second album; as the group lacked a bass guitarist, uncredited session bassist Larry Knechtel had doubled Ray Manzarek's keyboard bass lines on select tracks from their debut album. In contrast to Knechtel, Lubahn played on seven of the ten tracks on Strange Days (1967) as a credited contributor. The Doors invited Lubahn to join the group as a full-time member during the Strange Days sessions, using Rothchild as a messenger; however, Lubahn declined the offer for multiple reasons, including his refusal to leave Clear Light. He also played on all but two tracks on Waiting For The Sun (1968) and, albeit less prolifically, on The Soft Parade (1969).

=== Dreams ===
Doug Lubahn, with Jeff Kent, created jazz-rock band Dreams. The band evolved from a trio to a more horn-based band. Bassist Will Lee, pianist Don Grolnick, guitarist Bob Mann, and lead singer Eddie Vernon later joined the band. Dreams was short lived, lasting merely a year, with two albums released. Dreams (1969) was produced by producer, composer and audio engineer Fred Weinberg, and Imagine My Surprise (1970).

=== Pierce Arrow ===
Lubahn was the bassist and co-lead vocalist for the band Pierce Arrow, which issued two albums, Pierce Arrow (1977) and Pity the Rich (1978), on Columbia Records. The band also featured guitarist Werner Fritzsching (who also played in Cactus), with whom he would collaborate again in Riff Raff, and drummer Bobby Chouinard, who would later recruit Lubahn for Billy Squier's band.

=== Riff Raff (U.S.) ===
Lubahn was the bassist and lead vocalist for the U.S. rock band, Riff Raff, whose sole album, Vinyl Futures, was released on Atco Records in 1981. Vinyl Futures features the Lubahn penned song "Treat Me Right", which was a Billboard Top 20 hit for Pat Benatar and helped push her 1980 album Crimes of Passion to quadruple platinum sales in the U.S.

=== Billy Squier ===
Lubahn joined Billy Squier on two studio albums, 1982's multi-platinum selling Emotions in Motion and its equally successful 1984 follow-up, Signs of Life, and took part in world tours for both albums.

=== Ted Nugent ===
Lubahn played bass on Ted Nugent's 1984 album, Penetrator, which also featured vocalist Brian Howe.

=== Other work ===
Also in 1984, one of Lubahn's songs, "Talk to Me", appeared on Warrior, the platinum-selling debut album by New York band Scandal.

== Death ==
Doug Lubahn died on November 20, 2019, at age 71.
