= Signs of Life (Billy Squier album) =

Studio album by Billy Squier
- Released: July 1984
- Recorded: April 28, 1984 – June 16, 1984
- Genres: Hard rock; pop rock; progressive rock
- Length: 49:46
- Label: Capitol
- Producers: Billy Squier; Jim Steinman

Billy Squier chronology
Emotions in Motion (1982)	Signs of Life (1984)	Enough Is Enough (1986)

Singles from Signs of Life
- 1. "Rock Me Tonite" Released: June 19, 1984; 2. "All Night Long" Released: October 1984; 3. "Eye on You" Released: December 1984

Professional ratings
Review scores
Source	Rating
AllMusic	2/5 stars

Signs of Life is the fourth studio album by American musician Billy Squier. It was co-produced by Meat Loaf's songwriter Jim Steinman, replacing Reinhold Mack, who had produced Squier's previous two records, Don't Say No (1981) and Emotions in Motion (1982).

== Commercial and critical reception ==
Signs of Life became Squier's third-in-a-row platinum selling record. It was his highest new entry, at #61, on the Billboard album chart (also the peak of his next offering). The disc spent nearly a year in the charts, reaching #11. It made the Top 10 in Cash Box.

The album's best known song, "Rock Me Tonite," was Squier's best charting Pop hit and second #1 single in the Mainstream Rock charts. The perceived challenge to his image as a guitar-playing rocker is often regarded as one of the main reasons for Squier's subsequent decline in popularity. The music video for the song is commonly regarded as one of the worst in the history of MTV. In the book I Want My MTV, there is a whole chapter dedicated to it.

Apart from its lead single's music video, the album's elaborate production with heavy usage of synthesizers and poppier songwriting divided Squier's audience. Critics of the time noted the shift of a portion of Squier's rock audience to pop fans. In a two-star review, AllMusic's Mike DeGagne felt the album lacked the "over-the-top approach Squier usually adds to his music". Nowadays, the album is viewed as one of Squier's finest artistic achievements, despite its notoriety.

Cash Box described the second single from the album, "All Night Long," as a "superb combination of tight tracks, strong vocals and high energy." Cash Box said of the single "Eye on You" that it "is more typically melodic and moving than...'All Night Long'" and added that "with a strong chorus, hook and a mid-tempo backing, Squier’s vocals have a chance to breathe and he makes full use of a throaty growl."

== Track listing ==
All tracks are written by Billy Squier.

No.	Title	Length
1.	"All Night Long"	4:51
2.	"Rock Me Tonite"	4:56
3.	"Eye on You"	4:42
4.	"Take a Look Behind Ya"	5:03
5.	"Reach For the Sky"	5:34
6.	"(Another) 1984"	4:56
7.	"Fall for Love"	4:52
8.	"Can't Get Next to You"	4:36
9.	"Hand-Me-Downs"	4:22
10.	"Sweet Release"	6:15
Total length:		49:46

== Personnel ==
- Billy Squier – lead vocals, guitars, keyboards, synthesizers, production
- Jeff Golub – guitars, slide guitar
- Alan St. Jon – keyboards, synthesizers
- Doug Lubahn – bass guitar, backing vocals
- Bobby Chouinard – drums

=== Featured musicians ===
- Larry Fast – synthesizers
- Jimmy Maelen – percussion
- Eric Troyer and Rory Dodd – additional vocals on "Fall for Love" and "Reach for the Sky"
- Brian May – guitar solo on "(Another) 1984"
- Alfa Anderson – additional vocals on "(Another) 1984"

=== Production ===
- Billy Squier – producer
- Jim Steinman – producer
- John Jansen – production assistant
- Tony Platt – engineer
- Gary Rindfuss – assistant engineer
- J.B. Moore – mixing
- Anjali Dutt – tape operator
- George Marino – mastering
- Bill Smith – cover art design and illustration
- John Van Hamersveld – rear cover collage and inner sleeve design

== Charts ==
Chart (1984)	Peak position
Australian Albums (Kent Music Report)	96
Canada Top Albums/CDs (RPM)	42
German Albums (Offizielle Top 100)	59
US Billboard 200	11

== Certifications ==
Region	Certification	Certified units/sales
Canada (Music Canada)	Gold	50,000^{^}
United States (RIAA)	Platinum	1,000,000^{^}
^{^} Shipments figures based on certification alone.
