= The Big Beat (song) =

Song by Billy Squier

from the album The Tale of the Tape
- Released: 1980
- Genre: Rock
- Length: 3:39
- Label: Capitol
- Songwriter: Billy Squier
- Producers: Billy Squier; Eddy Offord

Music video
- "The Big Beat" music video on YouTube

The Big Beat is a 1980 song by Billy Squier from his debut album The Tale of the Tape. While it never charted, the song has become a sampling staple in hip-hop music. As of 2020, the song has been sampled in almost 300 recordings. The "big beat" itself was performed by drummer Bobby Chouinard overdubbed with Squier himself beating a snare case with his hands.

== Critical reception ==
Dantana of Okayplayer.com said The Tale of the Tape begins with "The Big Beat", and in retrospect set Squier's career off to a flying start with the kind of chorus, vocals, and power riffs that made him famous. Much of the playing in this song, from the slide guitar to that big booming sound of Chouinard's drums, would become Squier's trademark sound and it is great to hear it before it became too pop.".

Record World said that "Squier cries, sasses and yells emphatically in the upper ranges while the bulldozer rhythm plows a hard, straight-ahead rock'n'roll path."

== Samples ==
“The Big Beat” has been sampled in:

- Beck - "Soul Suckin' Jerk"
- Jay-Z – “99 Problems”
- Kanye West and Pusha T – “Looking for Trouble”
- Dizzee Rascal – “Fix Up, Look Sharp”
- Nas featuring will.i.am – “Hip Hop is Dead”
- Puff Daddy – “Can’t Nobody Hold Me Down”
- A Tribe Called Quest – “We Can Get Down”
- Big Daddy Kane – “Put Your Weight On It,” “Get Down,” “Ain’t No Half Steppin,” “The Beef Is On” and “3 Forties and a Bottle of Moet”
- Foster The People - "Houdini"
- Ice Cube – “Jackin’ for Beats”
- Alicia Keys – “Girl on Fire”
- Grandmaster Flash and the Furious Five – “Magic Carpet Ride”
- Whistle - I Am (1992)
- Run-D.M.C – “Here We Go,” "Jam-Master Jammin'"
- Unkle – “The Knock”
- UTFO – "Roxanne, Roxanne"
- Red Hot Chili Peppers – "Higher Ground (X-Ecutioners Remix)"
- Alessia Cara - "Scars to Your Beautiful"
- Little Mix - “Black Magic”

The track opens The Prodigy's The Dirtchamber Sessions Volume One mix.
