= Tell the Truth (Billy Squier album) =

Studio album by Billy Squier
- Released: March 4, 1993
- Genre: Rock
- Length: 60:00
- Label: Capitol
- Producer: Mike Chapman

Billy Squier chronology
Creatures of Habit (1991)	Tell the Truth (1993)	Happy Blue (1998)

Tell the Truth is the eighth studio album by Billy Squier that was released on March 4, 1993, and his most recent rock album to date. It contains the song "Angry", which became a modest, and his last, radio hit. It was not supported by Capitol Records, causing Squier to walk away from the music industry for several years.

In the US, the album failed to chart and sold fewer than 40,000 copies, according to Nielsen SoundScan, making it one of Squier's lowest-selling records.

== Track listing ==
All songs written by Billy Squier.

1. "Angry" (4:30)
2. "Tryin' to Walk a Straight Line" (4:05)
3. "Rhythm (A Bridge So Far)" (7:01)
4. "Hercules" (4:43)
5. "Lovin' You Ain't So Hard" (5:18)
6. "Time Bomb" (6:56)
7. "Stranger to Myself" (5:54)
8. "The Girl's All Right" (4:09)
9. "Break Down" (4:48)
10. "Not a Color" (5:13)
11. "Mind Machine" (3:59)
12. "Shocked Straight" (4:06)
