= Don't Say You Love Me (Billy Squier song) =

1989 single by Billy Squier

Single by Billy Squier

from the album Hear & Now
- B-side: "Too Much"
- Released: June 1989
- Genre: Hard rock
- Length: 4:31; 3:24 (7" edit)
- Label: Capitol
- Songwriter: Billy Squier
- Producers: Billy Squier, Godfrey Diamond and Jason Corsaro

Billy Squier singles chronology
"Love Is the Hero" (1986)	"Don't Say You Love Me" (1989)	"Don't Let Me Go" (1989)

"Don't Say You Love Me" is a song written and performed by American rock musician and singer Billy Squier. Released as the lead single from his sixth album Hear & Now, the song reached No. 4 on the Billboard Mainstream Rock Tracks chart, being his first top 5 radio hit there since 1984's "Rock Me Tonite". Aside of being a considerable hit on rock radio, its music video succeeded in bringing Squier back to MTV rotation as well as helping Hear & Now reach gold status.

Despite being recorded during the sessions for its parent album, the B-side "Too Much" wasn't included on it. The song is somewhat a rarity; back in the day being only available on the original US cassette single and Australian 7" vinyl. Later on, the song has been re-released on Squier's website as a download-only track. When buying the whole Hear & Now album, the song is automatically included as a bonus track.
