= The Tale of the Tape =

Studio album by Billy Squier
- Released: May 1980
- Recorded: 1979–1980
- Studios: Eddy Offord's remote studio, Woodstock, New York
- Genres: Rock, hard rock
- Length: 37:24
- Label: Capitol
- Producers: Billy Squier, Eddy Offord

Billy Squier chronology
Can't Wait (1977)	The Tale of the Tape (1980)	Don't Say No (1981)

Professional ratings
Review scores
Source	Rating
Okayplayer	link
Allmusic	link

The Tale of the Tape is the debut studio album by American rock musician Billy Squier. It was his first solo album, following two albums with the band Piper. Despite not being a huge success, the disc spent three months on Billboard's album chart and helped to kickstart Squier's solo career.

Although no songs from the album reached the charts, the song "The Big Beat" has been notably sampled by hip hop artists, including Run-D.M.C.'s "Here We Go", Big Daddy Kane's "Ain't No Half Steppin'", Jay-Z's "99 Problems", Dizzee Rascal's "Fix Up, Look Sharp", U.T.F.O's "Roxanne, Roxanne" and Alicia Keys' "Girl on Fire". The song also featured a pre-MTV music video.

== Critical reception ==
In a May 10, 1980, Billboard review, the writer expressed a hope that Billy Squier would be able to realize his potential with this album, which he did not fulfill with Piper. It quantified that it "fits nicely in a set with Journey and Styx."

== Track listing ==
All tracks are written by Billy Squier, except where noted.

No.	Title	Writer(s)	Length
1.	"The Big Beat"		3:36
2.	"Calley Oh"		4:05
3.	"Rich Kid"		4:39
4.	"Like I'm Lovin' You"		3:07
5.	"Who Knows What a Love Can Do"	Billy Squier, Fred St. John	3:39
6.	"You Should Be High, Love"	Billy Squier, Desmond Child	4:14
7.	"Who's Your Boyfriend"		3:34
8.	"The Music's All Right"		5:46
9.	"Young Girls"		4:08
Total length:			37:24

2006 Rock Candy reissue bonus tracks
No.	Title	Length
10.	"The Music's All Right" (original acoustic demo)	3:47
11.	"Young Girls" (abbreviated acoustic demo)	1:08

== Personnel ==
- Billy Squier - Vocals, Guitar, Percussion
- Bruce Kulick - Guitar
- David Sancious - Keyboards, Synthesizers
- Richard T. Bear - Keyboards
- Bucky Ballard - Bass
- Bobby Chouinard - Drums
- Ernest Carter - Percussion
- Woodstock Children's Chorus - Ellen Todd, Conductor

== Production ==
- Produced by Billy Squier & Eddy Offord
- Engineered and mixed by Eddy Offord & Rob Davis
- Mastered by Wally Traugott
- All songs published by Songs Of The Knight (BMI), except "Who's Your Boyfriend" (Songs Of The Knight/Bomass Music Corp.), "Who Knows What A Love Can Do" (Songs Of The Knight/Hostel Music), and "You Should Be High, Love" (Songs Of The Knight/Desmobile Music Company).

== Charts ==
Chart (1980)	Peak position
US Billboard 200	169
