= Enough Is Enough (Billy Squier album) =

Studio album by Billy Squier
- Released: September 27, 1986
- Studio: Power Station, New York City; Sarm East, London
- Genre: Rock
- Length: 47:05
- Label: Capitol
- Producer: Peter Collins

Billy Squier chronology
Signs of Life (1984)	Enough Is Enough (1986)	Hear & Now (1989)

Professional ratings
Review scores
Source	Rating
Allmusic	2/5 stars
Kerrang!	4.5/5 stars

Enough Is Enough is the fifth studio album by Billy Squier, released on September 27, 1986. It was the first album to be released under his second seven-year Capitol Records recording contract.

The disc peaked at #61 on the Billboard album chart and included the minor hit "Love Is the Hero" which featured Freddie Mercury on backing vocals. Despite mostly positive critical reception, Enough Is Enough was a commercial disappointment and sold about 300,000 copies in the United States, making it his first album since 1980's The Tale of the Tape to not reach platinum status.

== Track listing ==
1. "Shot o' Love" (Danny Kortchmar, Squier) - 4:06
2. "Love Is the Hero" (Squier) - 4:49
3. "Lady with a Tenor Sax" (Freddie Mercury, Squier) - 4:24
4. "All We Have to Give" (Squier) - 5:18
5. "Come Home" (Bobby Chouinard, Squier) - 3:55
6. "Break the Silence" (Squier) - 4:59
7. "Powerhouse" (Squier) - 4:18
8. "Lonely One" (Squier) - 4:16
9. "Til It's Over" (Squier) - 6:06
10. "Wink of an Eye" (Squier) - 4:54

== Personnel ==
- Billy Squier - vocals, guitars, synthesizers, multiple instruments, arrangements, mixing
- Jeff Golub - guitars
- Robin Jeffrey - guitars
- Jeff Bova - keyboards
- David Frank - keyboards, synthesizers, arrangements
- Andy Richards - keyboards
- Alan St. John - keyboards, synthesizers, backing vocals
- T.M. Stevens - bass
- Jimmy Bralower - drums, drum programming
- Bobby Chouinard - drums
- Steve Ferrone - drums on track 8
- Jody Linscott - percussion
- Freddie Mercury - vocals on track 2, arrangements on track 3
- Mitch Weissman - backing vocals

== Production ==
- Peter Collins - producer, arrangements
- Jimbo "James" Barton - engineer
- Steve Boyer, Paul Wright - assistant engineers
- Brian Gulland - arrangements, sound recording
- David Thoener - mixing
- Tim Leitner - mixing assistant
- George Marino - mastering

== Charts ==
Chart (1986)	Peak position
US Billboard 200	61
