= My Kinda Lover =

Single by Billy Squier

from the album Don't Say No
- B-side: "Christmas Is the Time to Say 'I Love You'"
- Released: November 1981
- Genre: Rock, hard rock
- Length: 3:32
- Label: Capitol
- Songwriter: Billy Squier
- Producers: Reinhold Mack; Billy Squier

Billy Squier singles chronology
"In the Dark" (1981)	"My Kinda Lover" (1981)	"Emotions in Motion" (1982)

"My Kinda Lover" is a rock song written and performed by American hard rock singer and guitarist Billy Squier. It was the third and final single released from his Triple Platinum 1981 album Don't Say No, following "In the Dark".

Record World said that "While his band spanks, crunches and crashes, Billy seduces with a light, likeable tenor."

It peaked at number 45 on the United States Billboard Hot 100, and number 43 on the Cash Box Top 100 chart in early 1982. It also reached number 31 on Billboard's Hot Mainstream Rock Tracks chart.

== Charts ==
Chart (1981/82)	Peak position
Australia (Kent Music Report)	64
US Billboard Hot 100	45
US Cash Box Top 100	43
US Billboard Rock Tracks	31

== Later uses ==
- Rapper Eminem sampled "My Kinda Lover" on his 2014 song "Shady XV".
- The song was used in the Mötley Crüe biopic, The Dirt, when lead singer Vince Neil is performing it with a cover band at a party when Tommy, Mick, and Nikki arrive to recruit Neil into the band.
