= Berzerk (song) =

2013 single by Eminem

Single by Eminem

from the album The Marshall Mathers LP 2
- Released: August 27, 2013
- Recorded: 2012–13
- Genre: Rap rock; hard rock
- Length: 3:58
- Label: Aftermath; Shady; Interscope
- Songwriters: Marshall Mathers; William Squier; Adam Horovitz; Adam Yauch; Rick Rubin; Joseph Modeliste; Arthur Neville; Cyril Neville; Leo Nocentelli; George Porter Jr.; Vincent Brown; Anthony Criss; Keir Gist
- Producer: Rick Rubin

Eminem singles chronology
"C'mon Let Me Ride" (2012)	"Berzerk" (2013)	"Survival" (2013)

Music video
- "Berzerk" on YouTube

"Berzerk" is a song by American rapper Eminem. The song, released on August 27, 2013, is the first single from Eminem's eighth studio album The Marshall Mathers LP 2. The song was produced by Rick Rubin and samples Billy Squier's "The Stroke", as well as the Beastie Boys' "Fight for Your Right", taken from their 1986 debut album Licensed to Ill, which Rubin had also produced, and Naughty by Nature's "Feel Me Flow". The song was heavily downloaded in its first week of release, resulting in the song debuting at number three on the US Billboard Hot 100.

== Composition ==
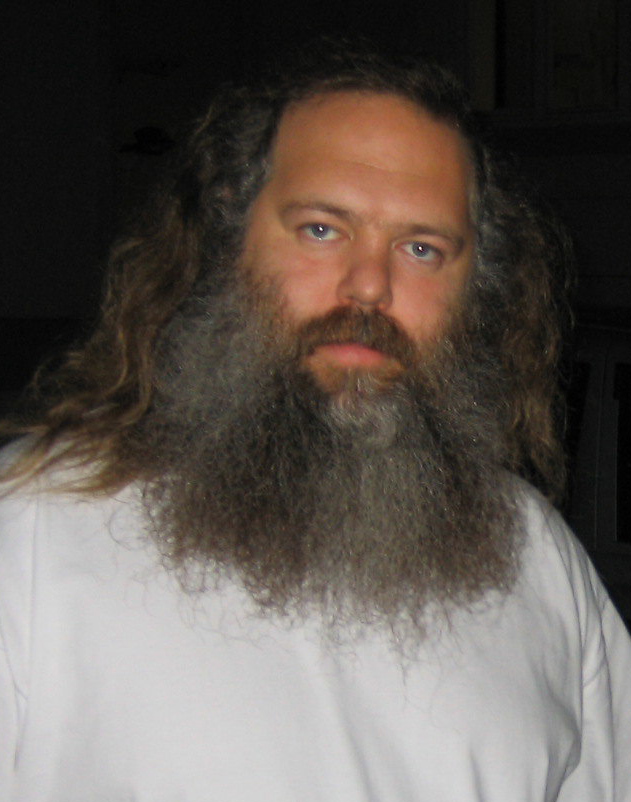
Rick Rubin produced "Berzerk".

The song, produced by Rick Rubin, samples Billy Squier's "The Stroke", the Beastie Boys' "Fight for Your Right", taken from their 1986 debut album Licensed to Ill and also produced by Rubin, and Naughty by Nature's "Feel Me Flow". Writing credits are given to Eminem, Rubin, Squier, Adam Yauch and Adam Horovitz of the Beastie Boys, and Anthony Criss, Vincent Brown, and Kier Gist of Naughty by Nature, Ziggy Modeliste, Art Neville, Cyril Neville, Leo Nocentelli and George Porter Jr. for the "Feel Me Flow" segment.

The song starts with a "blast of static, hard guitar and Em roaring out of the gate sounding like the long-lost, fourth Beastie Boy", according to Yahoo! Music critic Craig Rosen. The song samples the "Kick it!" part of "(You Gotta) Fight for Your Right (To Party!)", performed by Ad-Rock. According to Billboard's Lars Brandle, the song is "a punchy, guitar-and-beats driven song which channels Joan Jett & the Blackhearts' I Love Rock 'n' Roll and Licensed to Ill-era Beastie Boys."

== Music video ==
During the halftime at the September 7, 2013 Michigan–Notre Dame football game, Eminem premiered a preview of the music video for "Berzerk". Then the video was premiered two days later on September 9, via VEVO. The video was filmed in Brooklyn, New York and directed by Syndrome. It features cameo appearances from fellow American rappers Kendrick Lamar (Em's Aftermath labelmate) and Kid Rock (both of whom Eminem mentions in the song's lyrics) in addition to Shady Records labelmates Slaughterhouse (most prominently Royce da 5'9"), Mr. Porter, Yelawolf and The Alchemist, the song's producer Rick Rubin and Eminem's manager Paul Rosenberg. The video also features short clips of backyard wrestling, and public fights as well as short clips of the official music video of Billy Squier's "The Stroke", which is heavily sampled in the song. The video received a nomination at MTV Video Music Awards 2014 in the category "Best Hip-Hop Video".

== Release and promotion ==
"Berzerk" originally premiered on August 26, on SiriusXM channel, Shade 45. The Marshall Mathers LP 2, a sequel to Eminem's acclaimed studio effort The Marshall Mathers LP, was revealed during MTV Video Music Awards on August 25, 2013, with two previews of "Berzerk" via Beats By Dr. Dre commercials. Some critics describe Eminem's return in these commercials as the highlight of the show. The video that accompanied the song featured a boombox prominently. The song was the featured song for the 2013 season of Saturday Night Football, debuting with the September 7 Michigan–Notre Dame football rivalry game. On 10 November 2013 in Amsterdam for the MTV Europe Music Awards 2013, he performed "Berzerk" and also "Rap God".

== Commercial performance ==
"Berzerk" sold 362,000 downloads in its first week in the US, debuting at number three on the Billboard Hot 100 (behind Katy Perry's Roar and Robin Thicke's Blurred Lines) becoming Eminem's 15th Top 10 hit on the Hot 100. The song has peaked at number two on the Hot R&B/Hip-Hop Songs chart. When the R&B component of the chart is removed, the song debuted at number one on the Rap Songs chart. "Berzerk"'s debut is just below the debut of the lead single for Recovery, "Not Afraid", which sold 379,000 copies in its first week. It has sold over a million copies in the US as of October 2013.

In Canada, the song debuted at number two with 50,000 downloads sold, which more than doubled the 24,000 downloads sold in the debut week of "Not Afraid". It was Eminem's best one week download total ever in the country, until it was surpassed by the 54,000 downloads sold for Eminem's later single, "The Monster". The song was certified Double Platinum in Digital downloads in Canada on November 1, 2013.

The song debuted at number one on the UK R&B Chart and was replaced on the chart by his single "Rap God".

== Critical reception ==
Will Hermes of Rolling Stone gave the song 4 out of 5 stars, highlighting its goal to "celebrate old-school hip-hop". Robert Copsey of Digital Spy gave the song 4 out of 5 stars, stating the song "harks back" to Eminem's "Slim Shady days". Copsey compared the song to Beastie Boys circa 1986, although the song as "inimitable" and "unmistakably Eminem". VH1 India gave the song 8/10 concluding, "Whether you shudder under 'Berzerk's' cacophonous assault or wear its raps like an emblem — it's 2013, and Eminem still got your attention."

== Awards and nominations ==
Year	Ceremony	Award	Result
2014	Grammy Awards	Best Rap Performance	Nominated
2014	World Music Awards	Song of the Year	Nominated
2014	MTV Video Music Awards Japan	Best Hip-Hop Video	Nominated
2014	Detroit Music Awards	Outstanding Video / Major Budget (over $10,000)	Won
2014	MTV Video Music Awards	Best Hip-Hop Video	Nominated

== Track listing ==
Digital download

No.	Title	Writer(s)	Producer(s)	Length
1.	"Berzerk"	Marshall Mathers; William Squier; Adam Horovitz; Adam Yauch; Rick Rubin; Joseph Modeliste; Arthur Neville; Cyril Neville; Leo Nocentelli; George Porter Jr.; Vincent Brown; Anthony Criss; Keir Gist	Rick Rubin	3:58

CD release

No.	Title	Writer(s)	Producer(s)	Length
1.	"Berzerk" (explicit)	Marshall Mathers; William Squier; Adam Horovitz; Adam Yauch; Rick Rubin; Joseph Modeliste; Arthur Neville; Cyril Neville; Leo Nocentelli; George Porter Jr.; Vincent Brown; Anthony Criss; Keir Gist	Rick Rubin	3:59
2.	"Berzerk" (edited)	Marshall Mathers; William Squier; Adam Horovitz; Adam Yauch; Rick Rubin; Joseph Modeliste; Arthur Neville; Leo Nocentelli; George Porter Jr.; Vincent Brown; Anthony Criss; Keir Gist	Rick Rubin	3:58
Total length:				7:57

== Charts ==
=== Weekly charts ===
Chart (2013)	Peak position
Australia (ARIA)	5
Austria (Ö3 Austria Top 40)	22
Belgium (Ultratop 50 Flanders)	44
Belgium (Ultratop 50 Wallonia)	42
Brazil (ABPD)	50
Canada Hot 100 (Billboard)	2
Czech Republic Airplay (ČNS IFPI)	49
Denmark (Tracklisten)	15
France (SNEP)	10
Germany (GfK)	10
Greece Digital Songs (Billboard)	7
Hungary (Single Top 40)	17
Ireland (IRMA)	16
Italy (FIMI)	25
Japan Hot 100 (Billboard)	76
Netherlands (Single Top 100)	52
New Zealand (Recorded Music NZ)	12
Scottish Singles Sales (Official Charts)	3
South Korea International Singles (GAON)	1
Spain (Promusicae)	46
Sweden (Sverigetopplistan)	56
Switzerland (Schweizer Hitparade)	9
UK Singles (Official Charts)	2
UK Hip Hop/R&B (Official Charts)	1
US Billboard Hot 100	3
US Pop Airplay (Billboard)	18
US Hot R&B/Hip-Hop Songs (Billboard)	2

=== Year-end charts ===
Chart (2013)	Position
Australia (ARIA)	82
Canada (Canadian Hot 100)	60
France (SNEP)	98
Germany (Official German Charts)	78
UK Singles (Official Charts Company)	115
US Billboard Hot 100	67
US Hot R&B/Hip-Hop Songs (Billboard)	18
US Rap Songs (Billboard)	14
Chart (2014)	Position
US Hot R&B/Hip-Hop Songs (Billboard)	82

== Certifications ==
Region	Certification	Certified units/sales
Australia (ARIA)	3× Platinum	210,000^{‡}
Austria (IFPI Austria)	Gold	15,000^{*}
Brazil (Pro-Música Brasil)	Platinum	60,000^{‡}
Canada (Music Canada)	2× Platinum	160,000^{*}
Germany (BVMI)	Gold	150,000^{‡}
New Zealand (RMNZ)	Platinum	15,000^{*}
Sweden (GLF)	Gold	20,000^{‡}
United Kingdom (BPI)	Platinum	600,000^{‡}
United States (RIAA)	4× Platinum	4,000,000^{‡}
^{*} Sales figures based on certification alone.^{‡} Sales+streaming figures based on certification alone.

== Radio and release history ==
Region	Date	Format	Label
Italy	August 27, 2013	Contemporary hit radio	Universal Music
United States	August 27, 2013	Digital download	Shady, Aftermath, Interscope
United States	August 27, 2013	Mainstream urban radio	Shady, Aftermath, Interscope
United States	September 3, 2013	Contemporary hit radio	Shady, Aftermath, Interscope
United Kingdom	October 6, 2013	Digital download	Shady, Aftermath, Interscope
