= Lonely Is the Night =

"Lonely is the Night"

Song by Billy Squier

from the album Don't Say No
- Released: 1981
- Genre: Rock
- Length: 4:42
- Label: Capitol
- Songwriter: Billy Squier
- Producers: Reinhold Mack; Billy Squier

"Lonely Is the Night" is a song written and performed by American rock singer and guitarist Billy Squier. It appeared as the first track on side two of his triple-Platinum 1981 album, Don't Say No, and became a rock radio hit, reaching number 28 on Billboard's Hot Mainstream Rock Tracks chart. It was not released as a single, although it appeared on the B-side of UK pressings of Squier's hit "In the Dark".

In the Led Zeppelin biography, Hammer of the Gods, the song is mentioned, somewhat tongue-in-cheek, as one of the best singles Zeppelin ever put out, presumably for its similarity to another Led Zeppelin song. Although it doesn't specify what song that is, the song's intro is similar to that of "Nobody's Fault but Mine", while the chorus is nearly identical to “Good Times, Bad Times”. Led Zeppelin had disbanded a year before the song's release due to drummer John Bonham's death.

The song is featured in the 2013 video game Grand Theft Auto V on the fictional radio station Los Santos Rock Radio.

== Charts ==
Chart (1981)	Peak position
US Mainstream Rock (Billboard)	28

== Bibliography ==
- Davis, Stephen (1997). Hammer of the Gods: The Led Zeppelin Saga. Boulevard. ISBN 1-57297-306-4.
