= Don't Say No (album) =

Studio album by Billy Squier
- Released: April 13, 1981
- Recorded: 1980
- Genres: Rock; hard rock; pop
- Length: 38:11
- Label: Capitol
- Producers: Reinhold Mack, Billy Squier

Billy Squier chronology
The Tale of the Tape (1980)	Don't Say No (1981)	Emotions in Motion (1982)

Singles from Don't Say No
- 1. "The Stroke" Released: May 1981; 2. "In the Dark" Released: August 1981; 3. "My Kinda Lover" Released: November 1981; 4. "Too Daze Gone" Released: 1981 (only in UK)

Professional ratings
Review scores
Source	Rating
AllMusic	4.5/5 stars

Don't Say No is the second studio album by Billy Squier, released on April 13, 1981. It stands as Squier's biggest career album, including the hits "Lonely Is the Night", "In the Dark", "My Kinda Lover" and "The Stroke". The album hit the Top Five on the Billboard album chart and remained on the chart for over two years (111 weeks).

"The Stroke" was the first single, reaching number 17 on the Billboard Hot 100, and an even bigger hit at rock radio, hitting number 3 on the Mainstream Rock chart. The song even dented the British Pop charts, rising to number 52. The video for "The Stroke" — as most of the music videos from both Don't Say No and its follow-up, Emotions In Motion — is a straight-ahead performance piece, featuring Squier on an arena stage. Billy's many videos were staples on the then brand-new channel known as MTV which brought him increased popularity.

"In the Dark" followed "The Stroke" into the Billboard Top 40, and the Top 10 of the Album Rock Tracks chart. Some other tracks from the album were also hugely popular on AOR (Album Oriented Rock) radio stations, for example, "Lonely Is the Night", which became subsequently one of his signature songs despite not being a proper single release or having a music video.

The album was certified Gold by the RIAA for 500,000 sales in July 1981 and Platinum two months later. Though multi-platinum awards were not certified prior to 1984, Don't Say No belatedly received a Triple Platinum award in 1992, certifying sales of over 3 million US copies.

A cover of "Lonely Is the Night" is a playable track in the PlayStation 2 video game Guitar Hero Encore: Rocks the 80s, and the master recording is playable in Guitar Hero 5 and Rock Band 4.

On July 27, 2010 Shout! Factory released a 30th Anniversary edition of the album complete with newly remastered sound, bonus tracks, and a new booklet.

In early 2018, Intervention Records reissued Don't Say No on 180-gram vinyl and SACD/CD. The reissue is artist-approved, and according to Squier, "arguably the best-sounding version ever."

== Track listing ==
All tracks are written by Billy Squier.

No.	Title	Length
1.	"In the Dark"	4:09
2.	"The Stroke"	3:38
3.	"My Kinda Lover"	3:32
4.	"You Know What I Like"	2:56
5.	"Too Daze Gone"	4:05
6.	"Lonely Is the Night"	4:42
7.	"Whadda You Want from Me"	3:43
8.	"Nobody Knows" (dedicated to John Lennon)	4:20
9.	"I Need You"	3:52
10.	"Don't Say No"	3:20
Total length:		38:11

30th Anniversary Edition
No.	Title	Length
11.	"My Kinda Lover" (Live 2009)
12.	"The Stroke" (Live 2009)
13.	"The Stroke" (Rock Mix)

== Personnel ==
- Billy Squier – lead and backing vocals, lead and rhythm guitars, percussion, piano
- Cary Sharaf – lead guitar solo on “Lonely Is the Night”
- Alan St. Jon – keyboards
- Mark Clarke – bass guitar, backing vocals
- Bobby Chouinard – drums

Production

- Billy Squier – producer
- Reinhold Mack – producer, engineer

== Later samples ==
- "The Stroke"
  - "Stroke Me" by Mickey Avalon
  - "Berzerk" by Eminem from the album Marshall Mathers LP 2
- "My Kinda Lover"
  - "Shady XV" by Eminem from the album Shady XV

== Charts ==
Chart (1981)	Peak position
Australian Albums (Kent Music Report)	34
Canada Top Albums/CDs (RPM)	4
US Billboard 200	5

== Certifications ==
Region	Certification	Certified units/sales
Canada (Music Canada)	Platinum	100,000^{^}
United States (RIAA)	3× Platinum	3,000,000^{^}
^{^} Shipments figures based on certification alone.
