= Emotions in Motion =

Studio album by Billy Squier
- Released: July 23, 1982
- Genre: Hard rock
- Length: 41:20
- Label: Capitol
- Producers: Mack & Billy Squier

Billy Squier chronology
Don't Say No (1981)	Emotions in Motion (1982)	Signs of Life (1984)

Singles from Emotions in Motion
- 1. "Emotions in Motion" Released: July 1982; 2. "Everybody Wants You" Released: September 14, 1982; 3. "Learn How to Live" Released: 1982; 4. "Keep Me Satisfied" Released: 1982; 5. "She's a Runner" Released: January 1983

Professional ratings
Review scores
Source	Rating
Allmusic	3/5 stars

Emotions in Motion is the third studio album by American rock musician Billy Squier. It was released on July 23, 1982, and was Squier's second consecutive Top Five disc on the Billboard album chart. It contains the hit song "Everybody Wants You", which peaked at #32 on the Billboard Hot 100, and stayed at #1 on the Mainstream Rock Tracks chart for 6 weeks.

Other notably successful hits from the album included the singles "Emotions in Motion" and "She's a Runner". Some album cuts such as "Keep Me Satisfied" and especially "Learn How to Live" also received strong radio play and were issued as singles in some countries.

Emotions in Motion is one of Billy Squier's most popular albums, certified Gold in September 1982 and Platinum a month later. Though multi-platinum awards were not certified prior to late 1984, the album received a double platinum award in 1991. Emotions in Motion is also Billy's second best selling album, after the previous year's triple platinum Don't Say No.

The cover art was created for Squier by Andy Warhol. It was also the first of three consecutive albums from Squier to feature a guest appearance from one or more members of Queen – lead singer Freddie Mercury and drummer Roger Taylor sing backing vocals on the title track. Like its predecessor, the album was produced by Squier with Reinhold Mack, also known for Queen's The Game.

== Track listing ==
All tracks are written by Billy Squier.

No.	Title	Length
1.	"Everybody Wants You"	3:47
2.	"Emotions in Motion"	4:58
3.	"Learn How to Live"	4:05
4.	"In Your Eyes"	3:45
5.	"Keep Me Satisfied"	3:42
6.	"It Keeps You Rockin'"	4:06
7.	"One Good Woman"	3:41
8.	"She's a Runner"	4:02
9.	"Catch 22"	5:04
10.	"Listen to the Heartbeat"	4:25
Total length:		41:20

== Personnel ==
- Billy Squier - lead vocals, guitars
- Kevin Osborn - guitars
- Jeff Golub - guitars
- Alan St. Jon - keyboards, synthesizers, backing vocals
- Doug Lubahn - bass, backing vocals
- Bobby Chouinard - drums
- Dino Solera - saxophones on 2, 7 and 9
- Freddie Mercury, Roger Taylor - backing vocals on "Emotions in Motion", "emotional" support

== Production ==
- Billy Squier: producer, mixing
- Reinhold Mack: producer
- Gary Rindfuss: engineer, assistant engineer
- David Thoener: mixing
- Jim Ball: mixing assistant
- George Marino: mastering

== Charts ==
Chart (1982–83)	Peak position
Canada Top Albums/CDs (RPM)	8
US Billboard 200	5

== Certifications ==
Region	Certification	Certified units/sales
Canada (Music Canada)	Platinum	100,000^{^}
United States (RIAA)	2× Platinum	2,000,000^{^}
^{^} Shipments figures based on certification alone.
