= Rock Me Tonite =

1984 single by Billy Squier

Single by Billy Squier

from the album Signs of Life
- B-side: "Can't Get Next to You"
- Released: June 19, 1984
- Genre: Pop rock, synth-pop, hard rock
- Length: 4:57; 4:09 (7")
- Label: Capitol
- Songwriter: Billy Squier
- Producers: Jim Steinman; Billy Squier

Billy Squier singles chronology
"She's a Runner" (1983)	"Rock Me Tonite" (1984)	"All Night Long" (1984)

Audio
- "Rock Me Tonite" on YouTube

"Rock Me Tonite" is a hit song written and recorded by American rock artist Billy Squier. It was released in June 1984 as the lead single from his platinum-plus album Signs of Life. The song is Squier's highest charting U.S. single (as well as his last single to crack the top 40), peaking at No. 15 on the Billboard Hot 100 and hitting No. 10 on the Cash Box singles chart. It also returned him to No. 1 on the Top Rock Tracks chart in August 1984.

Despite its major success, the song is sometimes associated with the end of his career as a singles musician due to the music video, which was described as one of the worst ever in the 2011 books I Want My MTV: The Uncensored Story of the Music Video Revolution and MTV Ruled the World: The Early Years of Music Video. Directed by Kenny Ortega, it shows Squier dancing around a bed with pastel-colored satin sheets and wearing a pink tank top. Squier's concert ticket sales immediately declined and he later fired his managers. He has accused Ortega of deceiving him and altering his original concept, which Ortega denies. While Squier remains steadfast that the video was solely responsible for the initial decline in his popularity, other commentators are less certain.

== Song ==
Squier says the idea for the song came to him while he was on vacation in Greece with his girlfriend, while swimming off Santorini. "I've got a hit for the next record," he told her when he got out of the water. It begins with snapping fingers and footsteps, quickly joined by staccato chords from a synthesizer. Squier sings the first verse, during which the synthesizer adds a short bass figure.

On the second verse, the drums and guitar join, as well as a backing vocal. Squier sings with increasing intensity and volume into the chorus, announced by a drum roll. The synthesizers exit, to return during the next verse, accompanied by some lead guitar parts. At the next chorus, another synth part joins, bringing the song into the bridge.

Here the beat slows down, with synthesizer arpeggios over an electronic pulse. As it ends, heavy guitar chords return in the background until a break where Squier sings "Take me in your arms ..." unaccompanied. The chorus repeats through the song's fadeout.

== Reception ==
The single was released in mid-June 1984. By early fall it had reached No. 15 on the Billboard Hot 100 singles chart, his highest-charting Billboard single of his career, and the top 10 in Cash Box magazine. It also returned Squier to No. 1 on the Billboard Top Rock Tracks chart. In Canada's RPM, it reached No. 31.

"'Rock Me Tonite' represents Squier's effort to become acquainted with the emerging techno-pop scene of the early and mid-'80s," says AllMusic. "Within the song, Squier's old standards collide with his newfangled attempt at sounding hip, resulting in a catchy three-parts-pop, one-part-rock final product." While other songs on the album make similar efforts to blend an electronic sound with Squier's guitar-based rock, Allmusic says, only "Rock Me Tonite" succeeds.

Cash Box said that the song shows "musical growth displayed through a driving rhythm mixed with a shot of melodic metal".

== Music video ==
The video for the track was directed and choreographed by Kenny Ortega, who later directed the High School Musical films. It shows Squier waking up in a bed with satiny, pastel-colored sheets, then prancing around the bed as he gets dressed, ultimately putting on a pink tank top over a white shirt. At the conclusion he leaves the room with a pink guitar to join his band in performing the song.

For I Want My MTV, their 2011 oral history of the network's early years, authors Rob Tannenbaum and Craig Marks interviewed over 400 people, primarily artists, managers, filmmakers, record company executives and MTV employees. They said none could agree on the best video but all agreed that "Rock Me Tonite" was the worst. They devoted an entire chapter of the book to it. Martha Quinn, an MTV VJ when "Rock Me Tonite" was released, called it "a super-fun video and a super-great song," and commented, "I don’t remember that video being poorly received at the time."

Squier himself and other observers, believe its homoeroticism alienated a significant portion of his fan base (primarily teenage boys at the time) and ruined his career. "I liked Billy Squier very much," said Rudolf Schenker of Scorpions, "but then I saw him doing this video in a very terrible way. I couldn't take the music serious anymore."

In Greg Prato's 2011 book MTV Ruled the World: The Early Years of Music Video, Def Leppard singer Joe Elliott recalled his initial impressions of the video: "We were watching it through our fingers. I remember saying at the time, 'Mick Jagger can get away with that ... Billy Squier can't.' Sadly, I was right. It's just one of those things, where it's like, 'Oh man, no, please, don't do that!' We all loved the Don't Say No album—things like 'The Stroke' are fucking great. But then he goes and does that, and it's like, 'You've got to be kidding me'."

Ratt guitarist Warren DeMartini, whose band was on tour with Squier in 1984 at the time the video was released, recalled to Prato: "We almost never sound-checked, so we were laying around the hotel room, just passing our time watching TV. I was seeing [Squier] on local TV channels complaining that he used the wrong director, he was really talked into doing that. The thing that I could never understand was why it wasn't changed or stopped—because it was clearly something that was detrimental. I remember thinking, 'Why is this being allowed to continue'?"

=== History ===
The original concept for the video was Squier's. "[It] was based on the ritual of going to a concert," Squier recalled in 2011. "If we admit it, when we're getting ready to go out, we're checking our clothes and our hair." His idea was to show him doing that, paralleled by younger fans doing the same and then sneaking out to the show. He took it to Bob Giraldi, a director at the time much sought after in the wake of his highly successful video for Michael Jackson's "Beat It".

According to Squier, he played the song for Giraldi and shared the concept with him. The director was initially enthusiastic but then a week later changed his mind, saying it was not "something he'd want his kids to see." Mick Kleber, an executive at Squier's label, Capitol Records, clarifies that Giraldi was interested but wanted a bigger budget to work with. However, Capitol was not as open as other labels at the time to spending large amounts of money on videos so he declined because he did not expect the label to be forthcoming (the final video was still the most expensive Capitol had done at the time). Giraldi has said that Squier's original intuitions were right and that the video would have worked out had he directed it.

Squier and his management team then approached David Mallet, another popular music-video director of the time, whose work included Billy Idol's "White Wedding". Mallet put together some storyboards but they were quickly rejected. "The first thing he showed me was a scene of me riding into a diner on a white horse," says Squier. "I was like, 'Get rid of him.'" Kleber thinks that Mallet may not have believed the song would be a hit, especially compared with some of the other videos he had done for Capitol at the time and was just being courteous.

At this point, a date had already been set for the video's world premiere on MTV. "We're running out of time," Squier recalls. Capitol and his managers said they had talked to MTV about pushing the date back but the cable channel could not guarantee a later date (Arnold Stiefel, Rod Stewart's manager, suggests that if Squier's management had been firmer on this issue, they could have held MTV to its commitment no matter what date was ultimately set).

Ortega, a friend of Squier's girlfriend, called up Squier's managers and offered to direct the video. He had done choreography in some of Mallet's videos and directed the clip for the Pointer Sisters' "I'm So Excited". Neither manager was particularly enthusiastic about Ortega and pressured Squier to get rid of him. Capitol was disturbed that Squier had talked directly with Ortega, in opposition to their preferred practice but deferred to him. "By going around the label, he had thrown down the gauntlet," Kleber says.

Ortega suggested to Squier that he do some of the same moves he did during his shows, without his guitar. Squier's idea was that the resulting footage should be grainy and in darker, subdued colors, evoking the 1980 film American Gigolo. He rejected a suggestion by Ortega that it look instead like Tom Cruise's air guitar scene near the beginning of the 1983 film Risky Business.

Squier in a scene from the video

The video shoot was held in Los Angeles within two weeks of the world premiere date. Squier showed up on the soundstage and saw the decorated set. It was not what he had envisioned, and he expressed his misgivings. Ortega reassured him that the finished version would look like he wanted it to. Squier later stated, "I didn't like the sheets but I trusted the guy." Tom Mohler, one of Squier's managers, asked Ortega to make sure there was footage of the band performing the entire song to use as coverage; he says Ortega promised to do so but did not.

Mohler pleaded with Capitol president Jim Mazza to cancel the video but the label stood firm. "I wish I had had the balls to say to the label, 'We're not putting it out,'" Mohler laments.

Squier was aghast when he watched the video. Capitol told him not to worry since the single was so successful but his girlfriend told him it would ruin him. He was touring at the time and recalls that as soon as the video came out, he stopped selling out shows, in some cases performing to half-empty arenas. "I couldn't figure out why Capitol didn't pull that video and make another one," said Warren DeMartini of Ratt, who were opening for Squier at the time. Squier learned later that he could have done so himself, as Bruce Springsteen had been able to do with a video he disliked. "Everything I'd worked for my whole life was crumbling and I couldn't stop it."

As a result, he fired both his managers within a month. While they understood why, it was painful for Mohler in particular since Squier had been best man at his wedding earlier in the year. He hired Stiefel to replace them, completed his tour then took two years to release his next album, Enough Is Enough. He has never matched his early chart success since then.

In 2011, Squier talked about the experience as "an MBA course in how a video can go totally wrong."

The video misrepresents who I am as an artist. I was a good-looking, sexy guy. That certainly didn't hurt in selling records. But in this video I'm sort of pretty boy. And I'm preening around a room. People said "He's gay." Or "He's on drugs." It was traumatizing to me. I mean, I had nothing against gays. I have a lot of gay friends. But like it or not, it was more of a sticky point then.

While he remains angry at Ortega, who he believes purposely misled and exploited him, he is philosophical about the video. "The scars aren't that deep ... It's a bad part of a good life."

Ortega has refused to accept blame for the video, saying it was filmed as Squier had conceived. "If anything, I tried to toughen the image he was projecting," he told the author of a 1986 book about the record industry. He claims he and the video's editor had their names taken out of the credits when they got frustrated over their lack of creative input. "Let there be no doubt, 'Rock Me Tonite' was a Billy Squier video in every sense. If it has damaged his career he has no one to blame but himself." In 2012, Tannenbaum said that while researching I Want My MTV, he attempted to contact Ortega to get his response to Squier's complaints. He said the director's representatives delayed him until after the book's deadline passed so he never got an answer.

Writing for Ultimate Classic Rock, Jeff Giles disagrees with the assessment that the video ended Squier's career: "Just a quick scan through the top rock hits of 1983 and 1984 is all you need to find evidence that Squier was hardly alone in filming cheesy, low-budget or gender-bending videos."

== Charts ==
Chart (1984)	Peak position
Australia (Kent Music Report)	50
Canadian RPM Top Singles	31
US Billboard Hot 100	15
US Billboard Rock Tracks	1
US Cashbox Top 100	10

Year-end chart (1984)	Rank
US Top Pop Singles (Billboard)	99

== See also ==
- List of Billboard Mainstream Rock number-one songs of the 1980s
