= I Want My MTV (book) =

2011 book by Rob Tannenbaum and Craig Marks

I Want My MTV: The Uncensored Story of the Music Video Revolution
- First edition
- Author: Craig Marks; Rob Tannenbaum
- Language: English
- Subject: Video
- Genre: Music
- Publisher: Dutton Penguin (hardcover); Plume (paperback)
- Publication date: October 27, 2011
- Publication place: United States
- Media type: Hardcover; Paperback ebook
- Pages: 608 (hardcover); 592 (paperback)
- ISBN: 978-1-101-52641-5

I Want My MTV: The Uncensored Story of the Music Video Revolution is a book about the rise of American cable television channel MTV. It was written by music journalists Craig Marks and Rob Tannenbaum and published in 2011 by Dutton Penguin in the United States. I Want My MTV chronicles MTV from its inception August 1, 1981 until 1992 when it broke away from the all-video format with the reality show The Real World. Over 400 artists, directors, and staff of MTV were interviewed. The title is from a marketing campaign launched by the channel in 1981 where the catchphrase "I Want My MTV!" was used to encourage cable subscribers to request the channel on their cable TV lineup.

== Reception ==
I Want My MTV was named one of the Best Books of 2011 by NPR and Spin.

Time called it "compulsively entertaining, hugely edifying...and occasionally profound." The Washington Post described it as "full of nostalgia and inside tidbits, with lots of bizarre stories about animals on video sets." Amanda Mark, writing for the New York Review of Books, found it to lack an overall flow. She commented, "I Want My MTV reads like the world’s longest magazine article", concluding that "all these fun facts get lost in the choppiness of I Want My MTV as a whole, and very few people will be willing to read 600+ pages of sound bites."

== Documentary ==
A 90-minute documentary based on the book was released in 2020 on A&E.

== Film adaptation ==
In May 2026, Neon purchased a feature adaptation of the book to be directed by Geremy Jasper.
