= The Stroke =

Single by Billy Squier

from the album Don't Say No
- B-side: "Two Daze Gone"
- Released: April 1981
- Genre: Hard rock; funk rock
- Length: 3:38
- Label: Capitol
- Songwriter: William Squier
- Producers: Reinhold Mack; Billy Squier

Billy Squier singles chronology
"The Stroke" (1981)	"In the Dark" (1981)

Music video
- "The Stroke” on YouTube

"The Stroke" is a song written and recorded by American rock artist Billy Squier. It was released in 1981 as the debut single from his 3× platinum album Don't Say No.

This was Squier's first single to chart (although "In the Dark" charted first at Album Rock), peaking at No. 17 on the US Billboard Hot 100 and the Cash Box Top 100. It was a much bigger hit on rock radio, hitting No. 3 on the Top Tracks chart. It was Squier's only single released in the UK, where it made #52. The lyrics refer to the music business stroking the egos of musicians so that they will continue to play the game, though many likely assumed it was a sexual metaphor.

It was named the 59th best hard rock song of all time by VH1.

An acoustic blues version, "Stroke Me Blues", was released on his 1998 album Happy Blue.

== Charts ==
=== Weekly charts ===
Chart (1981)	Peak position
Australia (Kent Music Report)	5
Austria (Ö3 Austria Top 40)	3
Canada Top Singles (RPM)	7
New Zealand (Recorded Music NZ)	32
UK Singles (Official Charts)	52
US Billboard Hot 100	17
US Billboard Top Tracks	3
US Cash Box Top 100	17
US Record World	6

=== Year-end charts ===
Chart (1981)	Rank
Australia (Kent Music Report)	41
Canada Top Singles (RPM)	63
US Billboard Hot 100	76

== In popular culture ==
- The song was the inspiration for rap artist Maestro Fresh Wes' hit "Let Your Backbone Slide" (1989).
- In 1991 the German hard rock band Bonfire released a cover version as a single and on their album Knock Out.
- The song is featured in the 1995 film Billy Madison, during the scene where the titular character is seen arriving to school in his Pontiac Firebird. It also appears in the film's closing credits.
- In 2007, the song was used in an episode of the Adult Swim series Lucy, the Daughter of the Devil.
- Also in 2007, the song was used for the character Chazz Michael Michaels' solo figure-skating routine in Blades Of Glory.
- Rapper Mickey Avalon samples the song in his 2009 song "Stroke Me".
- The song was sampled in "Berzerk" by Eminem on his 2013 album The Marshall Mathers LP 2.
- Baseball player Davis Schneider of the Toronto Blue Jays uses the song as his walk-up music in the Rogers Centre.
