= Creatures of Habit (album) =

Studio album by Billy Squier
- Released: April 9, 1991
- Genre: Rock
- Length: 53:39
- Label: Capitol
- Producers: Godfrey Diamond, Billy Squier

Billy Squier chronology
Hear & Now (1989)	Creatures of Habit (1991)	Tell the Truth (1993)

Creatures of Habit is the seventh album by the American musician Billy Squier, released in 1991. "She Goes Down" was the first single. Squier supported the album with a North American tour.

The album peaked at No. 117 on the Billboard album chart, disappearing after six weeks. According to Nielsen SoundScan, it had sold just 85,000 copies at the time of its deletion.

== Critical reception ==
Professional ratings
Review scores
Source	Rating
AllMusic	2/5 stars
Calgary Herald	D
Chicago Tribune	2.5/4 stars

The Calgary Herald wrote that "Squier's vocal abilities are so limited it's amazing his career has lasted for more than one album." The Ottawa Citizen called the album "formula arena rock ... you've heard it all before." The Chicago Tribune noted that "although Squier's fans might have grown up, new songs such as 'She Goes Down' and '(L-O-V-E) Four Letter Word' show that Squier hasn't."

== Track listing ==
All songs written by Billy Squier except as indicated.

1. "Young at Heart" - 5:06
2. "She Goes Down" (Squier, Laura McDonald) - 4:07
3. "Lover" - 4:48
4. "Hollywood" - 4:57
5. "Conscience Point" - 5:27
6. "Nerves on Ice" - 5:05
7. "Hands of Seduction" - 5:32
8. "Facts of Life" - 4:31
9. "(L.O.V.E.) Four Letter Word" - 4:56
10. "Strange Fire" - 4:03
11. "Alone in Your Dreams (Don't Say Goodbye)" - 5:06

== Personnel ==
- Kenny Aaronson - Lap Steel Guitar
- Dave Asofsky - Assistant
- Steve Boyer - Engineer
- Jimmy Bralower - Drum Programming
- Bobby Chouinard - Drums
- Mark Clarke - Bass
- Victor Deyglio - Assistant
- Godfrey Diamond - Producer
- Ben Fowler - Assistant
- Jeff Golub - Guitar
- Alex Haas - Mixing, Overdubs
- Scott Hull - Pre-Mastering
- Doug Lubahn - Vocals (Background)
- George Marino - Mastering
- Dave O'Donnell - Engineer
- Bill Scheniman Engineer
- Art Smith Drum Technician
- Billy Squier - Art Direction, Composer, Guitar, Primary Artist, Producer, Vocals, Vocals (Background)
- Alan St. Jon - Keyboards, Synthesizer, Vocals
- Tommy Steele - Art Direction
- Mark Weiss - Photography

== Charts ==
Chart (1991)	Peak position
US Billboard 200	117
