= In the Dark (Billy Squier song) =

Single by Billy Squier

from the album Don't Say No
- B-side: "Whadda You Want from Me" (international); "Lonely Is the Night" (UK)
- Released: August 1981
- Genre: Hard rock; AOR
- Length: 4:09
- Label: Capitol
- Songwriter: Billy Squier
- Producers: Reinhold Mack; Billy Squier

Billy Squier singles chronology
"The Stroke" (1981)	"In the Dark" (1981)	"My Kinda Lover" (1981)

"In the Dark" is a hit song written and performed by American rock singer and guitarist Billy Squier.

It appeared as the opening track of his Triple Platinum 1981 album Don't Say No, and was released as the second single from that album, following "The Stroke". It reached #35 in Billboard, #46 in Record World, and #41 in Cash Box magazine. The pulsating track also hit #7 on Billboard's Hot Mainstream Rock Tracks chart. It was the second of Squier's Top 40 hits in the 1980s.

Record World called it "mass appeal sharp edged rock featuring a blockbuster hook and savage guitar outbursts."

The Village Voice magazine ranked the song at #6 on their list 20 Best Arena Rock Songs of All Time.

== Chart positions ==
Chart (1981)	Peak position
U.S. Billboard Rock Tracks	7
U.S. Billboard Hot 100	35
Canada RPM Top Singles	22
