= Uriah Heep discography =

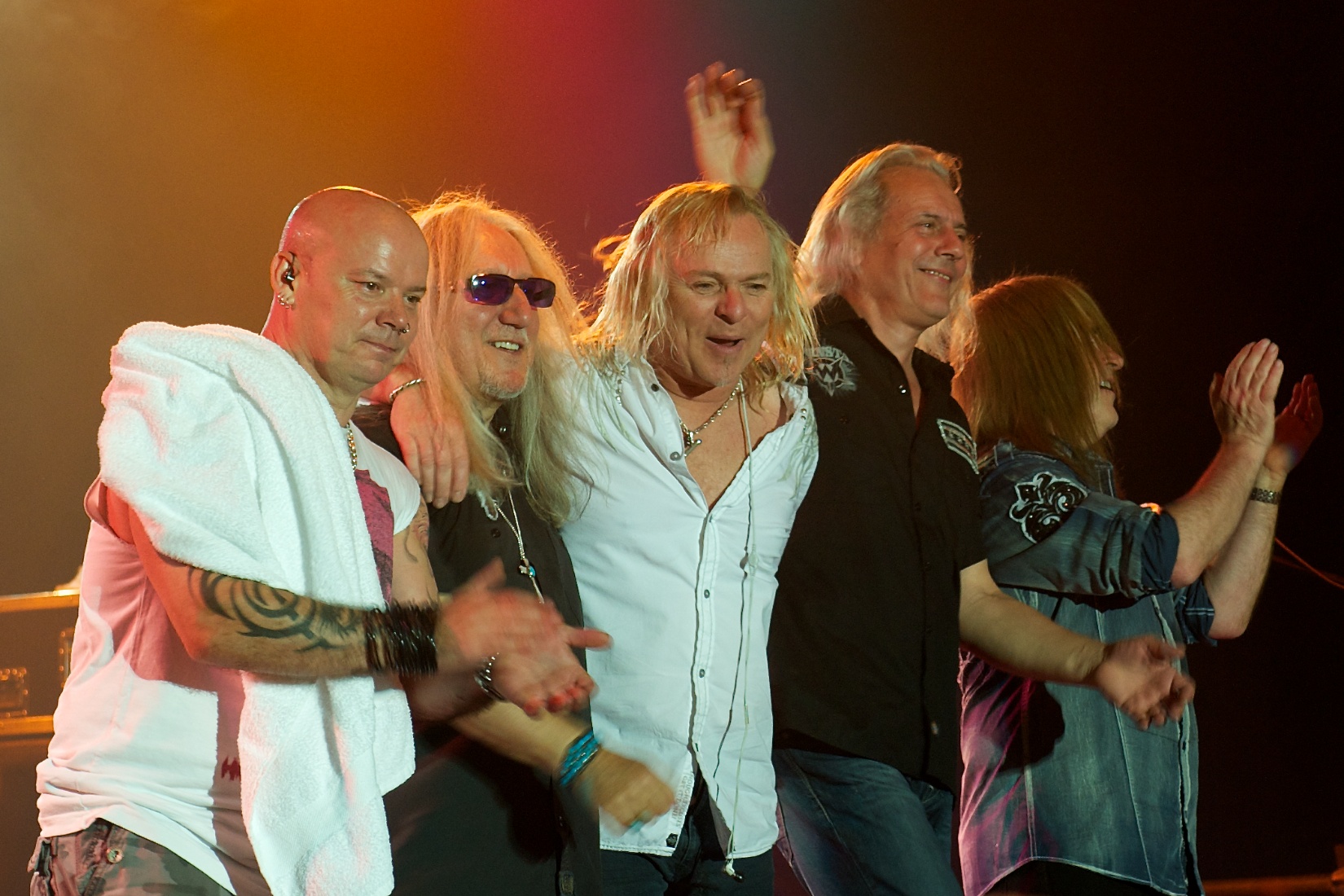
- Uriah Heep in 2011
- Studio albums: 25
- Live albums: 20
- Compilation albums: 41
- Singles: 33; UK: 27
- Video albums: 18

Over the years, the British hard rock band Uriah Heep has released 25 studio albums (of original material), 20 live albums, 41 compilation albums, 27 UK singles (33 worldwide) and 17 videos. The band's best selling album is Sweet Freedom, which was released in 1973 and its worldwide sales are more than 6 million copies. Uriah Heep's progressive/art rock/heavy metal fusion's distinctive features have always featured massive keyboards sound, strong vocal harmonies and (in the early years) David Byron's operatic vocals. Thirteen of the band's albums have made it to the UK Albums Chart (Return to Fantasy reached No. 7 in 1975) while of the fourteen Billboard 200 Uriah Heep albums Demons and Wizards was the most successful (No. 23, 1972). In the late 1970s the band had massive success in Germany, where the "Lady in Black" single was a big hit. With Black Sabbath, Deep Purple and Led Zeppelin, Uriah Heep became one of the top heavy metal and hard rock bands of the 1970s.

== Studio albums ==
Year	Album details	Peak chart positions											Certifications (sales thresholds)
Year	Album details	UK	AUS	CAN	GER	AUT	SWI	NOR	SWE	US	FIN	JPN	Certifications (sales thresholds)
1970	...Very 'Eavy ...Very 'Umble (titled Uriah Heep in the U.S.): Released: June 1970; Label: Vertigo, Mercury	—	15	84	22	—	—	—	—	186	14	41	
1971	Salisbury: Released: January 1971; Label: Vertigo, Mercury	—	19	—	31	—	—	—	—	103	3	47	
1971	Look at Yourself: Released: September 1971; Label: Bronze, Mercury	39	16	—	11	—	—	14	—	93	1	5	JP: Gold
1972	Demons and Wizards: Released: May 1972; Label: Bronze, Mercury	20	14	22	5	—	89	5	8	23	1	28	US: Gold
1972	The Magician's Birthday: Released: November 1972; Label: Bronze, Mercury	28	6	22	7	—	—	5	9	31	1	43	UK: Gold; US: Gold
1973	Sweet Freedom: Released: September 1973; Label: Bronze, Warner Bros.	18	19	5	12	9	—	2	13	33	2	45	UK: Silver; US: Gold
1974	Wonderworld: Released: June 1974; Label: Bronze, Warner Bros.	23	26	31	7	2	—	3	—	38	5	76	UK: Silver
1975	Return to Fantasy: Released: June 1975; Label: Bronze, Warner Bros.	7	22	83	21	3	—	2	9	85	8	74	UK: Silver
1976	High and Mighty: Released: May 1976; Label: Bronze, Warner Bros.	55	66	—	48	—	—	4	21	161	27	—	
1977	Firefly: Released: March 1977; Label: Bronze, Warner Bros.	—	—	—	17	—	—	6	35	166	21	—	
1977	Innocent Victim: Released: November 1977; Label: Bronze, Warner Bros.	—	44	—	15	—	—	13	—	—	—	—	AUS: Gold; GER: Gold; NZ: Gold
1978	Fallen Angel: Released: September 1978; Label: Bronze, Chrysalis	—	—	—	18	—	—	10	—	186	—	—	
1980	Conquest: Released: February 1980; Label: Bronze	37	—	—	33	—	—	11	—	—	—	—	
1982	Abominog: Released: April 1982; Label: Bronze, Mercury	34	—	—	52	—	—	30	—	56	—	—	
1983	Head First: Released: May 1983; Label: Bronze, Mercury	46	—	—	56	—	—	19	—	159	—	—	
1985	Equator: Released: March 1985; Label: Portrait, Columbia	79	—	—	—	—	—	—	—	—	—	—	
1989	Raging Silence: Released: April 1989; Label: Legacy, Enigma	—	—	—	—	—	26	—	—	—	—	—	
1991	Different World: Released: February 1991; Label: Legacy	—	—	—	—	—	—	—	—	—	—	—	
1995	Sea of Light: Released: May 1995; Label: HTD	—	—	—	87	—	29	—	—	—	—	—	
1998	Sonic Origami: Released: September 1998; Label: Eagle, Spitfire	—	—	—	—	—	—	—	—	—	—	—	
2008	Wake the Sleeper: Released: June 2008; Label: Sanctuary	—	—	—	—	—	55	—	55	—	—	—	
2011	Into the Wild: Released: April 2011; Label: Frontiers	—	—	—	32	58	42	—	29	—	31	—	
2014	Outsider: Released: 6 June 2014; Label: Frontiers	—	—	—	32	56	17	—	—	—	28	—	
2018	Living the Dream: Released: 14 September 2018; Label: Frontiers	57	—	—	10	18	5	28	—	—	28	—	
2023	Chaos & Colour: Released: 27 January 2023; Label: Silver Lining Music	73	—	—	4	10	5	40	60	—	16	—	

== Live albums ==
Year	Album details	Peak chart positions									Certifications (sales thresholds)
Year	Album details	UK	AUS	AUT	FIN	GER	JPN	NOR	SWE	US	Certifications (sales thresholds)
1973	Uriah Heep Live: Released: April 1973; Label: Bronze, Mercury	23	18	5	5	8	22	3	10	37	UK: Silver; US: Gold
1986	Live in Europe 1979: Released: 30 June 1986; Label: Raw Power, Castle	—	—	—	—	—	—	—	—	—	
1986	Live at Shepperton '74: Released: 10 November 1986; Label: Castle	—	—	—	—	—	—	—	—	—	
1988	Live in Moscow 1987: Released: 4 July 1988; Label:	—	—	—	—	—	—	—	—	—	
1996	Spellbinder Live 1994: Released: 1 July 1996; Label: Spitfire	—	—	—	—	—	—	—	—	—	
1997	King Biscuit Flower Hour Presents Uriah Heep in concert 1974: Released: 21 May 1997; Label: King Biscuit Flower Hour	—	—	—	—	—	—	—	—	—	
2000	Future Echoes of the Past: Released: 27 February 2000; Label: Classic Rock Productions	—	—	—	—	—	—	—	—	—	
2001	Acoustically Driven: Released: 2 June 2001,(recorded 2000); Label: Classic Rock Productions	—	—	—	—	—	—	—	—	—	
2001	Electrically Driven, live 2001: Released: 22 May 2001; Label: Classic Rock Productions	—	—	—	—	—	—	—	—	—	
2002	The Magician's Birthday Party: Released: 5 February 2002 (recorded 2001); Label: Classic Rock Productions	—	—	—	—	—	—	—	—	—	
2003	Live in the USA: Released: 6 November 2003; Label: Classic Rock Productions	—	—	—	—	—	—	—	—	—	
2004	Magic Night: Released: 6 November 2004,(recorded 2003); Label: Classic Rock Productions	—	—	—	—	—	—	—	—	—	
2010	Official Bootleg Series Vol. 1: Live at Sweden Rock Festival 2009: Released: February 2010; Label: Ear Music	—	—	—	—	—	—	—	—	—	
2010	Official Bootleg Series Vol. 2: Live in Budapest, Hungary 2010: Released: October 2010; Label: Ear Music	—	—	—	—	—	—	—	—	—	
2010	Official Bootleg Series Vol. 3: Live in Kawazaki, Japan 2010: Released: March 2011; Label: Ear Music	—	—	—	—	—	—	—	—	—	
2011	Official Bootleg Series Vol. 4: Live in Brisbane, Australia 2011: Released: September 2011; Label: Ear Music	—	—	—	—	—	—	—	—	—	
2011	Live in Armenia: Released: September 2011; Label: Ear Music	—	—	—	—	—	—	—	—	—	
2012	Official Bootleg Series Vol. 5: Live in Athens, Greece 2011: Released: March 2012; Label: Ear Music	—	—	—	—	—	—	—	—	—	
2013	Official Bootleg Series Vol. 6: Live at the Rock of Ages Festival 2008: Released: July 2013; Label: Ear Music	—	—	—	—	—	—	—	—	—	
2015	Live at Koko – London 2014: Released: February 2015; Label: Ear Music	—	—	—	—	—	—	—	—	—	

== Compilation albums ==
Year	Album details	Peak chart positions						Certifications (sales thresholds)
Year	Album details	AUT	FIN	GER	NOR	SWE	US	Certifications (sales thresholds)
1976	The Best of Uriah Heep: Released: November 1975; Label: Bronze, Mercury (SRM-1-1070)	8	—	—	—	47	145	GER: Gold
1985	Anthology: Released: 1985; Label: Parlophone / Elektra	—	—	—	—	—	—	
1986	Anthology Volume One: Released: April 1986; Label: Legacy	—	—	—	—	—	—	
1988	Collection: Released: 1988; Label: Legacy	—	—	—	—	—	—	
1989	The Collection: Released: 1989; Label: Castle	—	—	—	—	—	—	
1989	Ironstrike: 14 Rock Hard Hits: Released: 1989; Label: Avanti	—	—	—	—	—	—	
1989	Milestones: Released: 1989; Label: Castle	—	—	—	—	—	—	
1990	Still 'eavy Still Proud: Released: April 1990; Label: Legacy	—	—	—	—	—	—	
1990	Two Decades in Rock: Released: June 1990; Label: Essential	—	—	—	—	—	—	
1991	Echoes in the Dark: Released: 1991; Label: Elite	—	—	—	—	—	—	
1991	Rarities from the Bronze Age: Released: 1991; Label: Sequel	—	—	—	—	—	—	
1993	The Lansdowne Tapes: Released: July 1993; Label: Parlophone, Elektra	—	—	—	—	—	—	
1994	Lady in Black: Released: 21 November 1994; Label: Parlophone, Elektra	—	—	—	—	—	—	
1996	A Time of Revelation (4-CD box set): Released: 27 May 1996; Label: Essential	—	—	—	—	—	—	
1996	The Best of ... Part 1: Released: 1996; Label: Essential	—	—	—	—	—	—	
1997	The Best of ... Part 2: Released: April 1997; Label: Essential	—	—	—	—	—	—	
1998	Classic: An Anthology: Released: 15 September 1998; Label: Parlophone, Elektra	—	—	—	—	—	—	
2000	Easy Livin': Released: 2000; Label: Delta	—	—	—	—	—	—	
2000	Travellers in Time: Released: February 2000; Label: Essential	—	—	—	—	—	—	
2001	Blood on Stone: Released: March 2001; Label: Castle	—	—	—	—	—	—	
2001	Empty the Vaults: The Rarities: Released: June 2001; Label: Castle	—	—	—	—	—	—	
2001	Come Away Melinda: The Ballads: Released: June 2001; Label: Castle	—	—	—	—	—	—	
2001	Remasters: The Official Anthology: Released: 28 October 2001, Remasters features new re-mixes, alternate versions en re-recordings of classic Heep material from 1970 to 2001, recorded by the band line-up of 2001; Label: Parlphone, Elektra	—	—	—	—	—	—	
2001	20th Century Masters: The Millennium Collection: The Best of Uriah Heep: Released: 10 November 2001; Label: Parlophone, Elektra	—	—	—	—	—	—	
2002	The Very Best of Uriah Heep: Released: May 2002; Label: Sanctuary	—	—	—	—	—	—	
2002	Between Two Worlds: Released: 30 June 2002; Label: Parlophone, Elektra	—	—	—	—	—	—	
2003	The Very Best of Uriah Heep: Released: March 2003; Label: BMG Camden	—	—	—	—	—	—	
2003	The Ultimate Collection: Released: July 2003; Label: Parlophone, Elektra	—	11	—	14	—	—	
2004	Revelations: Released: February 2004; Label: Union Square Music	—	—	—	—	—	—	
2004	Rainbow Demon: Live & in the Studio 1994–1998: Released: April 2004; Label: Parlophone, Elektra	—	—	—	—	—	—	
2005	Chapter & Verse: Released: 27 February 2005; Label: Capitol	—	—	—	—	—	—	
2006	The Very Best of Uriah Heep: Released: February 2006; Label: Capitol	—	—	—	—	—	—	
2006	Easy Livin': Singles A's & B's: Released: 22 May 2006; Label: Capitol	—	—	—	—	—	—	
2007	Loud Proud & Heavy: The Best of Uriah Heep: Released: 5 February 2007; Label: Parlophone, Hollywood	—	—	—	—	—	—	
2009	Celebration – Forty Years of Rock: Released: 6 November 2009; Label: Edel	—	—	99	—	—	—	
2009	The Definite Spitfire Collection: Released: November 2009; Label: Store for Music	—	—	—	—	—	—	
2010	On the Rebound; A Very 'eavy 40th Anniversary Collection: Released: May 2010; Label: Sanctuary	—	—	—	—	—	—	
2010	The Uriah Heep Collection: Released: October 2010; Label: Brunswick	—	—	—	—	—	—	
2011	Wizards: The Best Of: Released: August 2011; Label: Parlophone, Atlantic, Sanctuary	—	—	—	—	—	—	
2012	Logical Revelations: Released: January 2012; Label: Store for Music	—	—	—	—	—	—	
2015	Totally Driven: Released: 12 November 2015; Label: Uriah Heep	—	—	—	—	—	—	

== Singles ==
Year	Title	Peak chart position											Certifications	Album
Year	Title	UK	US	GER	NZ	NOR	AUS	FIN	CAN	SWI	DEN	NL	Certifications	Album
1970	"Gypsy"	—	—	28	—	—	—	—	—	—	—	—		...Very 'Eavy ...Very 'Umble
1970	"Wake Up (Set Your Sights)" (Note: released in the US)	—	—	—	—	—	—	—	—	—	—	—		...Very 'Eavy ...Very 'Umble
1971	"Lady in Black"	—	—	5	—	—	—	16	—	6	—	—		Salisbury
1971	"High Priestess"	—	—	—	—	—	—	—	—	—	—	—		Salisbury
1971	"Look at Yourself"	—	—	33	—	—	—	—	—	4	—	—		Look at Yourself
1972	"The Wizard"	—	—	34	—	—	—	—	86	8	—	—		Demons and Wizards
1972	"July Morning" (Note: released in Japan)	—	—	—	—	—	—	—	—	—	—	—		Look at Yourself
1972	"Easy Livin'"	—	39	15	—	—	75	15	25	—	9	5		Demons and Wizards
1972	"Spider Woman"	—	—	14	—	—	—	—	—	—	—	—		The Magician's Birthday
1973	"Sweet Lorraine"	—	91	—	—	—	—	—	—	—	—	—		The Magician's Birthday
1973	"July Morning" (Live)	—	—	—	—	—	—	—	—	—	—	—		Uriah Heep Live
1973	"Love Machine" (Live)	—	—	—	—	—	—	—	—	—	—	—		Uriah Heep Live
1973	"Stealin'"	—	91	40	20	9	—	23	—	—	—	—	RMNZ: Gold	Sweet Freedom
1973	"Dreamer"	—	—	—	—	—	—	—	—	—	—	—		Sweet Freedom
1973	"Seven Stars" (Note: released in the Netherlands)	—	—	—	—	—	—	—	—	—	—	—		Sweet Freedom
1974	"Something or Nothing"	—	—	45	—	6	—	25	—	—	—	—		Wonderworld
1975	"Prima Donna"	—	—	—	—	3	—	—	—	—	10	—		Return to Fantasy
1975	"Return to Fantasy"	—	—	—	—	—	—	—	—	—	—	34		Return to Fantasy
1976	"One Way or Another" (Note: released in the UK)	—	—	—	—	—	—	—	—	—	—	—		High and Mighty
1976	"Make a Little Love" (Note: released in Norway)	—	—	—	—	—	—	—	—	—	—	—		High and Mighty
1977	"Wise Man"	—	—	—	—	—	—	—	—	—	—	—		Firefly
1977	"Sympathy"	—	—	37	—	—	—	—	—	—	13	—		Firefly
1977	"Free Me"	—	—	9	3	—	18	—	—	8	—	—		Innocent Victim
1978	"Love or Nothing"	—	—	36	—	—	—	—	—	—	—	—		Fallen Angel
1978	"Come Back to Me"	—	—	40	—	—	—	—	—	—	—	—		Fallen Angel
1979	"One More Night" (Note: released in Germany)	—	—	—	—	—	—	—	—	—	—	—		Fallen Angel
1980	"Carry On"	—	—	—	—	—	—	—	—	—	—	—		Conquest
1980	"Feelings"	—	—	—	—	—	—	—	—	—	—	—		Conquest
1980	"Love Stealer"	—	—	—	—	—	—	—	—	—	—	—		Non-album single
1981	"Think It Over"	—	—	—	—	—	—	—	—	—	—	—		Non-album single
1982	"On the Rebound"	—	—	—	—	—	—	—	—	—	—	—		Abominog
1982	"That's the Way That It Is"	—	106	—	—	—	—	—	—	—	—	—		Abominog
1983	"Lonely Nights"	85	—	—	—	—	—	—	—	—	—	—		Head First
1983	"Stay on Top"	76	—	—	—	—	—	—	—	—	—	—		Head First
1985	"Rockarama"	—	—	—	—	—	—	—	—	—	—	—		Equator
1985	"Poor Little Rich Girl"	—	—	—	—	—	—	—	—	—	—	—		Equator
1989	"Hold Your Head Up"	—	—	—	—	—	—	—	—	—	—	—		Raging Silence
1989	"Blood Red Roses"	—	—	—	—	—	—	—	—	—	—	—		Raging Silence
1991	"Different World"	—	—	—	—	—	—	—	—	—	—	—		Different World
1995	"Dream On"	—	—	—	—	—	—	—	—	—	—	—		Sea of Light
1998	"Heartless Land"	—	—	—	—	—	—	—	—	—	—	—		Sonic Origami
2001	"Lady in Black" (Live)	—	—	—	—	—	—	—	—	—	—	—		Acoustically Driven
2011	"Nail on the Head"	—	—	—	—	—	—	—	—	—	—	—		Into the Wild
2014	"One Minute"	—	—	—	—	—	—	—	—	—	—	—		Outsider
2018	"Grazed by Heaven"	—	—	—	—	—	—	—	—	—	—	—		Living the Dream
"—" denotes releases that did not chart or were not released in that country.

== Video albums ==
Year	Title	Format
1985	Easy Livin' – A History of Uriah Heep	VHS
1989	Raging Through the Silence	VHS
1990	Live Legends	VHS
1990	Gypsy	VHS
1995	Live in Moscow (Japan only)	VHS
2000	The Legend Continues	VHS/DVD
2001	Acoustically Driven	VHS/DVD
2001	Sailing the Sea of Light	VHS/DVD
2002	The Magician's Birthday Party	DVD
2002	Moscow and Beyond...	DVD
2003	Live in the USA	DVD
2004	Magic Night	DVD
2004	The Ultimate Anthology	DVD
2004	Classic Heep Live from the Byron Era	DVD
2004	Rock Legends	DVD
2005	Between Two Worlds	DVD
2006	The Live Broadcasts	DVD
2010	Live in Concert	DVD
2013	One More Night: Collectors Rarities	DVD
2015	Live at Koko – London 2014	DVD

== Music videos ==
List of music videos
Title	Year
"Lady In Black"	1971
"The Wizzard"	1972
"Easy Living"	1972
"Sunrise"	1972
"Sweet Freedom"	1973
"Come Back To Me"	1978
"Carry On"	1980
"Feelings"	1980
"Think It Over"	1981
"Thats The Way That It Is"	1982
"Stay On Top"	1983
"Rockarama"	1985
"Blood Red Roses"	1989
"Into the Wild"	2011
"Glazed By Heaven"	2018
"Take Away My Soul"	2018
"Save Me Tonight"	2022
"Hurricane"	2023
"Golden Light"	2023
