= The Ultimate Collection (Uriah Heep album) =

Compilation album by Uriah Heep
- Released: 9 September 2003
- Genre: Hard rock, progressive rock, heavy metal, arena rock
- Length: 157:46
- Label: Sanctuary

Uriah Heep compilation chronology
The Very Best of Uriah Heep (2003)	The Ultimate Collection (2003)	Revelations (2004)

Professional ratings
Review scores
Source	Rating
AllMusic	3/5 stars

The Ultimate Collection is a compilation album released by the British rock group Uriah Heep. It features songs from their debut album ...Very 'Eavy ...Very 'Umble through their 1991 album Different World.

== Track listing ==
=== Disc one ===
1. "Gypsy" (Mick Box, David Byron) - 6:38
2. "Come Away Melinda" (Fred Hellerman, Fran Minkoff) - 3:47
3. "Bird of Prey" (Box, Byron, Ken Hensley, Paul Newton) - 4:12
4. "Lady in Black" (Hensley) - 4:42
5. "Look at Yourself" (Hensley) - 5:08
6. "July Morning" (Byron, Hensley) - 10:32
7. "The Wizard" (Hensley, Mark Clarke) - 2:59
8. "Easy Livin'" (Hensley) - 2:36
9. "Sunrise" (Hensley) - 4:03
10. "The Magician's Birthday" (Box, Hensley, Lee Kerslake) - 10:18
11. "Sweet Lorraine" (Box, Byron, Gary Thain) - 4:14
12. "Stealin'" (Hensley) - 4:48
13. "Sweet Freedom" (Hensley) - 6:34
14. "Wonderworld" (Hensley) - 4:29
15. "Something or Nothing" (Box, Hensley, Thain) - 2:55

=== Disc two ===
1. "Return to Fantasy" (Hensley, Byron) - 5:41
2. "Prima Donna" (Byron, Box, Kerslake, Hensley) - 3:08
3. "One Way or Another" (Hensley) - 4:38
4. "Wise Man" (Hensley) - 4:39
5. "Free Me" (Hensley) - 3:30
6. "Free and Easy" (John Lawton, Box) - 3:03
7. "Come Back to Me" (Kerslake, Hensley) - 4:17
8. "Fallen Angel" (Hensley) - 4:57
9. "Feelings" (Hensley) - 5:19
10. "Too Scared to Run" (Box, Bob Daisley, Peter Goalby, Kerslake, John Sinclair) - 3:48
11. "On the Rebound" (Russ Ballard) - 3:12
12. "Think It Over" (Trevor Bolder, John Sloman) - 3:34
13. "That's the Way It Is" (Paul Bliss) - 4:07
14. "The Other Side of Midnight" (Box, Daisley, Goalby, Kerslake, Sinclair) - 3:55
15. "Stay on Top" (Tom Jackson) - 3:35
16. "Hold Your Head Up" (Rod Argent, Chris White) - 4:30
17. "Blood Red Roses" (Goalby) - 4:08
18. "Blood on Stone" (Bolder) - 4:34
19. "Different World" (Box, Phil Lanzon) - 4:12

== Personnel ==
- Mick Box - Lead Guitar, Backing Vocals - All tracks
- David Byron - Lead Vocals - (Track 1–17)
- Ken Hensley - Keyboards, Hammond Organ, Synths, Guitar, Lead and backing Vocals, - (Track 1–24)
- Paul Newton - Bass guitar, Vocals - (Track 1–6)
- Alex Napier - Drums - (Track 1 and 2)
- Keith Baker - Drums - (Track 3 and 4)
- Ian Clarke - Drums - (Track 5 and 6)
- Lee Kerslake - Drums, Backing Vocals - (Track 7–23, 25–34)
- Mark Clarke - Bass guitar, Vocals - (Track 7)
- Gary Thain - Bass guitar - (Track 8–15)
- John Wetton - Bass guitar, vocals - (Track 16–18)
- John Lawton - Lead vocals - (Track 19–23)
- Trevor Bolder - Bass guitar, Backing vocals - (Track 19–24, 31–34)
- John Sloman - Lead Vocals - (Track 24)
- Chris Slade - Drums - (Track 24)
- Bob Daisley - Bass guitar, Backing vocals - (Track 25–30)
- Peter Goalby - Lead vocals - (Track 25–30)
- John Sinclair - Keyboards, Guitars, Backing vocals - (Track 25–30)
- Phil Lanzon - Keyboards, Vocals - (Track 31–34)
- Bernie Shaw - Lead vocals - (Track 31–34)
