= Sunrise (Uriah Heep song) =

Song by Uriah Heep

from the album The Magician's Birthday
- Released: November 1972
- Recorded: September 1972
- Studio: Lansdowne (London)
- Genre: Progressive rock; hard rock
- Length: 4:04
- Label: Bronze; Mercury
- Songwriter: Ken Hensley
- Producer: Gerry Bron

Sunrise is a song by the British rock band Uriah Heep, originally released on their fifth studio album, The Magician's Birthday, in 1972. The song was written by Ken Hensley and sung by David Byron. The song is considered one of the band's classics, and it also became famous for its live performances in late 1972 and 1973. It was included, as the opening track, on the band's first ever live album, Uriah Heep Live, in 1973. The song was recorded and mixed at Lansdowne Studios, London, in September 1972, and released on The Magician's Birthday in November of the same year. The song is also the B-side of the single "Spider Woman".

== Appearances in other albums ==
The song has been appeared in many of Uriah Heep's live, compilation, video and even studio albums since it was originally recorded.

- Uriah Heep Live in 1973
- The Best of Uriah Heep in 1976
- Echoes in the Dark in 1991
- Platinum: The Ultimate Collection in 1995
- A Time of Revelation in 1996
- Classic Heep: An Anthology in 1998
- Travellers in Time: An Anthology, Vol. 1 in 1999
- The Legend Continues in 2001
- 20th Century Masters: The Millennium Collection: The Best of Uriah Heep in 2001
- Electrically Driven in 2001
- Sailing the Sea of Light in 2001
- Remasters: The Official Anthology in 2001
- The Box Miniatures in 2002
- The Magician's Birthday Party in 2002
- The Ultimate Collection in 2003
- Gold: Looking Back 1970–2001 in 2004
- Classic Heep Live From the Byron Era in 2004
- Chapter & Verse in 2005
- Uriah Heep Hit Pac - 5 Series in 2008
- Celebration in 2009
- Live at Sweden Rock in 2010
- Live in Armenia in 2011
- Official Bootleg in 2011
- Official Bootleg Vol. 2: Live in Budapest, Hungary 2010 in 2011
- Official Bootleg Vol.4: Live From Brisbane 2011 in 2011
- Uriah Heep Official Bootleg: 19.12.9 Gusswerk in 2011

== Personnel ==
- Mick Box — Guitar
- Lee Kerslake — Drums
- Gary Thain — Bass guitar
- Ken Hensley — Keyboards
- David Byron — Lead vocals

== Covers ==
- Soviet Georgian group VIA Iveria covered the song on their 1974 LP Voskhod Solnca.
- Swedish band Narnia in the compilation album A Return To Fantasy-A Tribute To Uriah Heep.
