= The Best of Uriah Heep =

Compilation album by Uriah Heep
- Released: 1974 (Canada); November 1975 (Europe); February 1976 (US)
- Recorded: 1969–1973
- Genre: Progressive rock, hard rock, heavy metal
- Length: 35:51 (Canada); 46:13 (Europe); 45:01 (US)
- Label: Bronze (Europe); Mercury (Canada and US)
- Producer: Gerry Bron

Uriah Heep compilation chronology
The Very Best of Uriah Heep (1974)	The Best of Uriah Heep (1974)	Anthology (1985)

European edition cover

US edition cover

Professional ratings
Review scores
Source	Rating
AllMusic	4.5/5 stars

The Best of Uriah Heep (also known as Best of...) is the title of the most successful compilation album by the British rock band Uriah Heep. It was released by Bronze Records and Mercury Records in three distinct editions with roughly the same songs, but different cover art and track listing. The first edition was released in 1974 in Canada, the second in 1975 in Europe and the third the following year in the US. Some European editions had the song "Lady in Black" substituted by "Suicidal Man". The compilation reached gold status in Germany.

== Track listings ==
=== Canadian edition ===
Side one

1. "The Magician's Birthday" (Mick Box, Ken Hensley, Lee Kerslake) – 10:23
2. "Look at Yourself" (Hensley) – 5:07
3. "The Wizard" (Mark Clarke, Hensley) – 2:59

Side two

1. "Gypsy" (David Byron, Box) – 2:45
2. "Walking in Your Shadow" (Byron, Paul Newton) – 4:31
3. "Easy Livin'" (Hensley) – 2:37
4. "Love Machine" (Box, Byron, Hensley) – 3:37

=== European edition ===
Side one

1. "Gypsy" – 2:45
2. "Bird of Prey" (Box, Byron, Ken Hensley, Paul Newton) – 4:05
3. "July Morning" (Byron, Hensley) – 10:36
4. "Look at Yourself" – 5:07

Side two

5. "Easy Livin'" – 2:36
6. "The Wizard" – 2:59
7. "Sweet Lorraine" (Box, Byron, Gary Thain) – 4:13
8. "Stealin'" (Hensley) – 3:17
9. "Lady in Black" (Hensley) – 4:43
10. "Return to Fantasy" (Hensley, Byron) – 5:52

=== US edition ===
Side one

1. "Easy Livin'" – 2:37
2. "Lady in Black" – 4:43
3. "Bird of Prey" – 4:05
4. "Sunrise" (Hensley) – 4:04
5. "The Wizard" – 2:59
6. "Sweet Lorraine" – 4:13

Side two

7. "July Morning" – 10:36
8. "Look at Yourself" – 5:07
9. "Gypsy" – 6:37

== Charts ==
Chart (1975–1978)	Peak position
German Albums (Offizielle Top 100)	21
Norwegian Albums (VG-lista)	13
Swedish Albums (Sverigetopplistan)	47
US Billboard 200	145

Chart (1995)	Peak position
Norwegian Albums (VG-lista)	8

== Certifications ==
Region	Certification	Certified units/sales
Germany (BVMI)	Gold	250,000^{^}
^{^} Shipments figures based on certification alone.
