= Blind Eye =

Single by Uriah Heep

from the album The Magician's Birthday
- A-side: "Sweet Lorraine"
- B-side: "Blind Eye"
- Released: November 1972
- Recorded: September 1972
- Length: 3:33
- Label: Bronze; Mercury
- Songwriter: Ken Hensley
- Producer: Gerry Bron

Uriah Heep singles chronology
"Easy Livin'" (1972)	"Blind Eye" (1972)	"Sweet Lorraine" (1972)

"Blind Eye" is a song by the British band Uriah Heep, which was originally released on their fifth studio album The Magician's Birthday in 1972, and the B-side of the "Sweet Lorraine" single. "Blind Eye" was written by Ken Hensley. It charted at #97 in the U.S. Billboard Hot 100. It was included on Uriah Heep's live album Acoustically Driven in 2001. The song was recorded and mixed at Lansdowne Studios, London, in September 1972.

== Personnel ==
- Mick Box — Guitars
- Lee Kerslake — Drums
- Gary Thain — Bass guitar
- Ken Hensley — Keyboards-Guitars
- David Byron — Lead vocals
