= Rain (Uriah Heep song) =

Song by Uriah Heep

from the album The Magician's Birthday
- Released: 1972
- Recorded: 1972
- Length: 3:59
- Label: Bronze; Mercury
- Songwriter(s): Ken Hensley
- Producer(s): Gerry Bron

"Rain" is a song by the English progressive rock/hard rock band Uriah Heep, which was originally released on their fifth studio album, The Magician's Birthday, in 1972. Though the song was never released as a single, it is one of the most well-known songs from the album. It was written by Ken Hensley, who also performed the keyboard/piano element of the song, with vocals by David Byron. It was the band's first song to use only the keyboards/piano and vocals with some additional bass guitar parts. AllMusic said the song was a "lovely piano ballad". Songwriter Hensley recorded a slightly different version for inclusion on his 1973 debut solo album Proud Words on a Dusty Shelf.

== Recording ==
The song was recorded and mixed at Lansdowne Recording Studios, London, in September 1972. It was released on The Magician's Birthday in November of the same year.

== Personnel ==
- David Byron – Vocals
- Ken Hensley – Keyboards, Piano
- Gary Thain – Bass guitar
