= Uriah Heep Live =

Live album by Uriah Heep
- Released: April 1973 (US); 11 May 1973 (UK)
- Recorded: 26 January 1973
- Venues: Town Hall, Birmingham, England
- Genres: Hard rock, progressive rock, heavy metal
- Length: 77:17
- Labels: Bronze and Island; Mercury (North America)
- Producer: Gerry Bron

Uriah Heep live chronology
Uriah Heep Live (1973)	Live in Europe 1979 (1986)

Singles from Uriah Heep Live
- 1. "July Morning" Released: May 1973 (US); 2. "Love Machine" Released: July 1973 (Japan)

Professional ratings
Review scores
Source	Rating
AllMusic	4/5 stars
Collector's Guide to Heavy Metal	8/10
Record Collector	4/5 stars

Uriah Heep Live is a double live album by British rock group Uriah Heep, released in April 1973 in the US by Mercury Records, and in May 1973 in the UK by Bronze Records. It was the band's first live album. The album was recorded by the Pye Mobile Unit, with Alan Perkins as engineer.

In addition to a live version of the band's hit "Easy Livin'", the record included live cuts such as "Sweet Lorraine", "Sunrise" and an extended live version of "July Morning". While the band was on tour in the United States, the album reached No. 23 in the UK Albums Chart.

The original album packaging, as typical in early 1970s rock music, featured a gatefold sleeve and centre pages featuring photographs of the band members.

Uriah Heep Live was certified gold by the RIAA on 12 October 1973; it was the band's third US gold album.

Mercury initially re-released the album on CD in 1989 without the medley, due to time constraints. This was restored on all later editions, including the reissues in 1990 by Castle Communications; remastered and expanded 2003/2010 by Sanctuary Records.

== Track listing ==
Side one
No.	Title	Writer(s)	Original album	Length
1.	"Introduction / Sunrise"	Thomas "Todd" Fischer / Ken Hensley	The Magician's Birthday, 1972	3:58
2.	"Sweet Lorraine"	Mick Box, David Byron, Gary Thain	The Magician's Birthday	4:27
3.	"Traveller in Time"	Byron, Lee Kerslake, Box	Demons and Wizards, 1972	3:20
4.	"Easy Livin'"	Hensley	Demons and Wizards	2:43

Side two
No.	Title	Writer(s)	Original album	Length
5.	"July Morning"	Byron, Hensley	Look at Yourself, 1971	11:23
6.	"Tears in My Eyes"	Hensley	Look at Yourself	4:34

Side three
No.	Title	Writer(s)	Original album	Length
1.	"Gypsy"	Box, Byron	...Very 'Eavy ...Very 'Umble, 1970	13:32
2.	"Circle of Hands"	Hensley	Demons and Wizards	8:47

Side four
No.	Title	Writer(s)	Original album	Length
3.	"Look at Yourself"	Hensley	Look at Yourself	7:29
4.	"The Magician's Birthday"	Box, Hensley, Kerslake	The Magician's Birthday	1:15
5.	"Love Machine"	Hensley, Box, Byron	Look at Yourself	3:07
6.	"Rock 'n' Roll Medley:"			8:17

- Roll over Beethoven (Chuck Berry)
- Blue Suede Shoes (Carl Perkins)
- Mean Woman Blues (Claude Demetrius)
- Hound Dog (Jerry Leiber and Mike Stoller)
- At the Hop (Artie Singer, John Medora, David White)
- Whole Lotta Shakin' Goin' On (Dave Williams)

2003 Expanded Deluxe Edition bonus disc
No.	Title	Writer(s)	Length
1.	"Something or Nothing" (US radio show)	Box, Hensley, Thain	3:11
2.	"I Won't Mind" (US radio show)	Box, Byron, Hensley, Kerslake, Thain	5:51
3.	"Look at Yourself" (US radio show)	Hensley	6:19
4.	"Gypsy" (US radio show)	Box, Byron	4:49
5.	"Easy Livin'" (film mixes used for radio)	Hensley	3:20
6.	"So Tired" (film mixes used for radio)	Box, Byron, Hensley, Kerslake, Thain	3:55
7.	"I Won't Mind" (film mixes used for radio)	Box, Byron, Hensley, Kerslake, Thain	5:51
8.	"Something or Nothing" (film mixes used for radio)	Box, Hensley, Thain	3:23
9.	"The Easy Road" (film mixes used for radio)	Hensley	3:07
10.	"Stealin'" (film mixes used for radio)	Hensley	5:31
11.	"Love Machine" (film mixes used for radio)	Hensley, Box, Byron	2:15
12.	"Rock 'n' Roll Medley '74" (film mixes used for radio)	Berry / Perkins / Demetrius / Leiber and Stoller / Singer, Medora, White / Williams	7:49
Total length:			55:21

== Personnel ==
Uriah Heep

- David Byron – lead vocals
- Mick Box – guitar, backing vocals
- Ken Hensley – keyboards, guitar, backing vocals
- Lee Kerslake – drums, percussion, backing vocals
- Gary Thain – bass guitar, backing vocals

Additional personnel

- Thomas "Todd" Fischer – stage announcer

Production

- Gerry Bron – producer
- Peter Gallen – producer assistant, mixing at Lansdowne Studios, London
- Ashley Howe – mixing
- Alan Perkins, Neville Crozier, Richard Brand – live recording engineers
- Gilbert Kong – mastering
- Mike Brown and Robert Corich – remastering (1996 and 2003 reissues)
- Andy Pearce – remastering (2010 reissue)

== Charts ==
Chart (1973)	Peak position
Australian Albums (Kent Music Report)	18
Austrian Albums (Ö3 Austria)	5
Danish Albums (Hitlisten)	23
Finnish Albums (The Official Finnish Charts)	5
German Albums (Offizielle Top 100)	7
Japanese Albums (Oricon)	22
Norwegian Albums (VG-lista)	3
UK Albums (Official Charts)	23
US Billboard 200	37

== Certifications ==
Certifications for Uriah Heep Live
Region	Certification	Certified units/sales
Germany (BVMI)	Gold	250,000^{^}
United Kingdom (BPI)	Silver	60,000^{^}
United States (RIAA)	Gold	500,000^{^}
^{^} Shipments figures based on certification alone.
