= Spider Woman (song) =

Single by Uriah Heep

from the album The Magician's Birthday
- B-side: "Sunrise"
- Released: December 1972
- Genre: Hard rock, blues rock
- Length: 2:25
- Label: Bronze; Mercury
- Songwriters: Mick Box, David Byron, Gary Thain, Lee Kerslake
- Producer: Gerry Bron

Uriah Heep singles chronology
"Sweet Lorraine" (1972)	"Spider Woman" (1972)	"July Morning" (1973)

"Spider Woman" is a song by the British rock band Uriah Heep, released on their fifth studio album The Magician's Birthday in 1972. The song was written by David Byron, Mick Box, Gary Thain and Lee Kerslake. "Spider Woman" was released as the lead single from the album in Europe, reaching number 14 in the German charts for twelve weeks. The B-side of the single is "Sunrise", except for Japan, where it was the A-side. The song was recorded in Lansdowne Studios, London, in September 1972.

The song is played with eight chords: E7+9, D, A, E, G, F, G# and F#. There is an intro at the beginning of the song and an outro for the ending.

== Personnel ==
- Mick Box – Guitar
- David Byron – Vocals
- Ken Hensley – Keyboards, Guitar
- Lee Kerslake – Drums
- Gary Thain – Bass

== Charts ==
Chart (1973)	Peak position
West Germany (GfK)	14
