= Something or Nothing =

Single by Uriah Heep

from the album Wonderworld
- A-side: "Something or Nothing"
- B-side: "What Can I Do"
- Released: 10 May 1974
- Recorded: January/March 1974
- Length: 2:56
- Label: Bronze
- Songwriters: Ken Hensley, Mick Box, Gary Thain
- Producer: Gerry Bron

Uriah Heep singles chronology
"Stealin'" (1973)	"Something or Nothing" (1974)	"Prima Donna" (1975)

"Something or Nothing" is a song by British rock band Uriah Heep. The song was written by Ken Hensley, Mick Box and Gary Thain and sung by David Byron. The song is the sixth track on their seventh album Wonderworld, it is also the first track on the second side of the album. "Something or Nothing" was recorded at Musicland Studios in Munich, Germany during January and March 1974. The B-side of the song is "What Can I Do" which has never been released on the album "Wonderworld". The song is being played with only four chords: D,A,C and G. The song has been performed during Uriah Heep live concerts, and was included on their second live album Live at Shepperton '74 as the fourth track.

== Personnel ==
- Mick Box – lead guitars
- David Byron – vocals
- Ken Hensley – organ, guitar
- Lee Kerslake – drums
- Gary Thain – bass
