= July Morning (song) =

1971 single by Uriah Heep

Single by Uriah Heep

from the album Look at Yourself
- B-side: "Love Machine"
- Released: June 1972 (Japan): May 1973 (live single) (US)
- Genre: Progressive rock; hard rock; heavy metal
- Length: 10:32 (album version): 3:31 (single version)
- Label: Bronze (Japan); Mercury (US)
- Songwriters: David Byron, Ken Hensley
- Producer: Gerry Bron

Uriah Heep singles chronology
"Spider Woman" (1972)	"July Morning" (1972)	"Stealin'" (1973)

"July Morning" is a song by the English rock band Uriah Heep. It is the third track on their 1971 album Look at Yourself.

The song was written in July 1971 by the band's keyboardist Ken Hensley and lead singer, David Byron, in the key of C minor.

The song has four verses and four choruses, featuring an organ introduction and a guitar solo. There is a guitar bridge between the first and second parts of the song.

AllMusic contributor Dave Thompson described the song as the best produced by Uriah Heep, with a "magnificent arrangement and performance", and in 1995, Radiomafia added "July Morning" to their list of "Top 500 Songs".

"July Morning" was first released on the Look at Yourself album and as a single in Japan and Venezuela. The Venezuelan single split the song across both sides of the 7", while the Japanese single featured an edited version of the song, which was later released on the band's greatest hits album Your Turn to Remember in 2016. The live version from Uriah Heep Live was released as a single in the US. In 2009 the band released a new version of the song on the album Celebration.

Uriah Heep's manager Gerry Bron thought Manfred Mann not only played an important part in the original studio recording, but also played a crucial role in its development.

== Charts ==
Monthly chart performance for "July Morning"
Chart (1977)	Peak position
Soviet Union International Songs (MK)	8

== Other appearances ==
The song has been appeared on many Uriah Heep live, compilation and studio albums and videos.

- Uriah Heep Live – 1973
- The Best of Uriah Heep – 1976
- Live in Europe – 1987
- Live in Moscow – 1988
- The Collection – 1989
- Still 'Eavy Still Proud – 1994
- Platinum: The Ultimate Collection – 1995
- A Time of Revelation – 1996
- The Best of... Part 1 – 1996
- King Biscuit Flower Hour Presents Uriah Heep in Concert – 1997
- Rock Progression – 1998
- Classic Heep: An Anthology – 1998
- Three Classic Albums: ...Very 'Eavy ...Very 'Umble, Salisbury, Look at Yourself – 1998
- The Best of Pts. 1-2 – 1999
- Travellers in Time: An Anthology Vol. 1 – 1999
- Future Echoes of the Past – 2001
- 20th Century Masters – The Millennium Collection: The Best of Uriah Heep – 2001
- Electrically Driven – 2001
- Sailing the Sea of Light – 2001
- Radio Caroline Calling 70's Flashback – 2001
- Remasters: The Official Anthology – 2001
- The Box Miniatures – 2002
- The Magician's Birthday Party – 2002
- Two Sides of Uriah Heep – 2003
- The Ultimate Collection – 2003
- Revelations: The Uriah Heep Anthology – 2004
- Gold: Looking Back 1970–2001 – 2004
- From the Front Row... Live! – 2004
- The Anthology – 2004
- Best of Symfo Rock – 2005
- Chapter & Verse – 2005
- Between Two Worlds – 2005
- Wake Up: The Singles Collection – 2006
- Bird of Prey: Best of Uriah Heep – 2006
- Easy Livin': Singles A's & B's – 2006
- Very Best of Uriah Heep – 2006
- Celebration – 2009
- Live at Sweden Rock – 2010
- Wizards: The Best of Uriah Heep – 2011
- Live in Armenia – 2011
- Official Bootleg Vol. 3: Live in Kawasaki in Japan 2010 – 2011
- Official Bootleg – 2011
- Official Bootleg Vol. 4: Live From Brisbane 2011 – 2011
- Official Bootleg Vol. 2: Live in Budapest Hungary 2010 – 2011
- Uriah Heep Official Bootleg: 19.12.9 Gusswerk – 2011
- Official Bootleg Vol.5: Live in Athens, Greece – 2011
- Great British Rock – 2011
- Rock Legends – 2011
- Icon – 2012
- Totally Driven – 2015
- Your Turn to Remember – 2016

== Personnel ==
- David Byron – lead vocals
- Mick Box – lead guitar, acoustic guitar
- Ken Hensley – keyboards, backing vocals
- Paul Newton – bass
- Ian Clarke – drums
- Manfred Mann – Minimoog synthesizer

== Other performances ==
"July Morning"

Song by Axel Rudi Pell

from the album The Masquerade Ball
- Released: 10 April 2000 (album)
- Recorded: November 1999 – February 2000
- Genre: Progressive rock; hard rock; heavy metal; power metal
- Length: 9:58
- Label: Sledgehammer/SPV
- Songwriters: David Byron, Ken Hensley

- Soviet Georgian group VIA Iveria recorded the song on their 1975 album Iveria.
- Hideki Saijo西城秀樹(1955~2018), a Japanese singer and an actor performed the song in his solo stadium concert『BIG GAME '80』in Tokyo and Osaka in Japan. https://ja.wikipedia.org/wiki/BIG_GAME%2780_HIDEKI
- German heavy metal guitarist Axel Rudi Pell recorded this song on his album The Masquerade Ball in 2000.
- Every year on 30 June in Bulgaria, people from all over the country travel to the Black Sea coast to watch the sunrise on 1 July. During the event people often sing "July Morning". Until his death in 2021, John Lawton performed the song at these events, backed by the Bulgarian band BTR.
- Polish band Kult covered this song on remastered version of their album Kaseta.

== See also ==
- July Morning
