= One Way or Another (Uriah Heep song) =

Single by Uriah Heep

from the album High and Mighty
- B-side: "Misty Eyes"
- Released: 18 June 1976
- Recorded: December 1975–March 1976
- Studio: Roundhouse, London
- Genre: Hard rock
- Length: 4:37
- Label: Bronze
- Songwriter: Ken Hensley

Uriah Heep singles chronology
"Return to Fantasy" (1975)	"One Way or Another" (1976)	"Wise Man" (1977)

"One Way or Another" is a song by English rock band Uriah Heep. It was released on their ninth studio album High and Mighty in May 1976, and became the only single from the album and the last single with the band's former vocalist, David Byron. The song was written by Ken Hensley and featured lead vocals from John Wetton and Ken Hensley. It was recorded from December 1975 to March 1976 in Roundhouse Recording Studios in London. The single did not chart, and it is the only song on the album that was not sung by David Byron.

== Composition ==
The song is being played with seven chords and the chords are Dm7, G/D, Asus4, G, Bm, A, and Eb.

== Personnel ==
- Mick Box – guitars
- David Byron – backing vocals
- Ken Hensley – lead vocals, keyboards
- John Wetton – lead vocals, bass
- Lee Kerslake – drums
