= Prima Donna (Uriah Heep song) =

Single by Uriah Heep

from the album Return to Fantasy
- A-side: "Prima Donna"
- Released: 13 June 1975
- Recorded: May 1975
- Length: 3:11
- Label: Bronze
- Songwriters: David Byron, Mick Box, Lee Kerslake, Ken Hensley
- Producer: Gerry Bron

Uriah Heep singles chronology
"Something or Nothing" (1974)	"Prima Donna" (1975)	"Return to Fantasy" (1975)

"Prima Donna" is a song by British rock band Uriah Heep from their eighth studio album Return to Fantasy (1975), released as the first single from the album. The song was written by David Byron, Mick Box, Lee Kerslake and Ken Hensley. It was recorded in May 1975 in Lansdowne and Morgan Studios, London. The song reached number ten in Denmark and number three in Norway.

== Personnel ==
- David Byron – lead vocals
- Mick Box – guitar
- Ken Hensley – keyboards, backing vocals
- Lee Kerslake – drums, backing vocals
- John Wetton – bass, backing vocals
- Mel Collins – saxophone
