= Kaseta =

Studio album by Kult
- Released: 1989
- Recorded: June 1989
- Genre: Alternative rock, punk rock, hard rock
- Length: 41:32
- Label: Arston

Kult chronology
Tan (1989)	Kaseta (1989)	45-89 (1990)

Kaseta is an album by the rock band Kult. It was originally released in 1989 on LP album through Arston and on music cassette through Bogdan Studio. It was rereleased in 1995 on compact disc and music cassette through S.P. Records.

== Track listing ==
All tracks by Kult (music) and Kazik Staszewski (lyrics), except where noted.

Side one
No.	Title	Length
1.	"Oni chcą ciebe"	5:37
2.	"Londyn"	5:01
3.	"Kwaska"	3:43
4.	"Fali"	7:39
Total length:		22:00

Side two
No.	Title	Length
5.	"Dzieci Wiedzą Lepiej"	3:06
6.	"Jaką Cenę Możesz Zapłacić"	3:29
7.	"Tut"	3:17
8.	"Czekając Na Królestwo J.H.W.H."	6:10
9.	"Po Co Wolność"	3:30
Total length:		19:32

1995 reissue bonus track
No.	Title	Writer(s)	Length
10.	"Lipcowy poranek"	Ken Hensley, David Byron	9:10

== Credits ==
- Kazik Staszewski – lead vocals
- Janusz Grudzinski – keyboard, lead guitar
- Ireneusz Werenski – bass guitar
- Rafal Kwasniewski – guitar
- Piotr Falkowski – percussion, guitar, vocals
- Krzysztof Banasik – horn
- Pawel Jordan – soprano saxophone, tenor saxophone
- Roman Kozak – trombone
- Robert Sadowski – guitar
