= Look at Yourself =

Look at Yourself may refer to:

- Look at Yourself (Uriah Heep album)
- Look at Yourself (Emmure album)
- "Look at Yourself" (song), a 1971 song by Uriah Heep
