= Sweet Lorraine (disambiguation) =

"Sweet Lorraine" is a 1928 jazz standard by Cliff Burwell and Mitchell Parish.

Sweet Lorraine may also refer to:

- "Sweet Lorraine" (Uriah Heep song), a 1972 single by the band Uriah Heep
- Sweet Lorraine (film), a 1987 American film by Steve Gomer
