= Sweet Lorraine (Uriah Heep song) =

1972 single by Uriah Heep

Single by Uriah Heep

from the album The Magician's Birthday
- A-side: "Sweet Lorraine"
- B-side: "Blind Eye"
- Released: January 1973
- Length: 4:13
- Label: Bronze; Mercury
- Songwriters: Mick Box, David Byron, Gary Thain
- Producer: Gerry Bron

Uriah Heep singles chronology
"Blind Eye" (1972)	"Sweet Lorraine" (1973)	"Spider Woman" (1972)

Official audio
- "Sweet Lorraine" (2017 Remaster) on YouTube

"Sweet Lorraine" is a song by the band Uriah Heep, first released on the 1972 album The Magician's Birthday on Bronze Records, and released as a single mainly for the American market though it was also released in a few European countries. It was written by Mick Box, Gary Thain and David Byron and reached #91 in the US Billboard Hot 100. The B-side is "Blind Eye".

One of the band's better-known songs, it is famous, in part, for its Moog synthesizer solo performed by Ken Hensley. It became popular in live performance.

== Personnel ==
- David Byron – vocals
- Ken Hensley – Hammond organ, Moog synthesizer
- Mick Box – guitar
- Lee Kerslake – drums
- Gary Thain – bass guitar

== Charts ==
Chart (1973)	Peak position
US Billboard Hot 100	91
