= Live in Armenia =

Live album

Live album by Uriah Heep
- Released: September 2011
- Recorded: Yerevan, Armenia, 16 October 2009
- Genre: Hard rock, progressive rock
- Length: 79:47
- Label: Frontiers
- Producer: Mike Paxman

Uriah Heep live chronology
Official Bootleg Volume Four: Live in Brisbane, Australia 2011 (2011)	Live in Armenia (2011)	Official Bootleg Volume Five: Live in Athens, Greece 2011 (2012)

Live in Armenia

Video by Uriah Heep
- Released: September 2011
- Recorded: Yerevan, Armenia, 16 October 2009
- Genre: Hard rock, progressive rock
- Label: Frontiers
- Producer: Mike Paxman

Uriah Heep chronology
Between Two Worlds – Live in London (2005)	Live in Armenia (2011)

Professional ratings
Review scores
Source	Rating
AllMusic	3/5 stars

Live in Armenia is a 2011 double live album by British rock group Uriah Heep, comprising a live 2-CD set and corresponding DVD.

== Track listing ==
=== CD 1 ===
1. "Wake the Sleeper" – 3:32
2. "Overload" – 5:57
3. "Tears of the World" – 4:44
4. "Stealin'" – 6:45
5. "Book of Lies" – 4:03
6. "Gypsy" – 4:31
7. "Look at Yourself" – 5:07
8. "What Kind of God" – 6:36
9. "Angels Walk with You" – 5:23
10. "Shadow" – 3:35

=== CD 2 ===
1. "July Morning" – 10:36
2. "Easy Livin'" – 3:01
3. "Sunrise" – 4:04
4. "Sympathy" – 4:44
5. "Lady in Black" – 7:09

The DVD track listing is the same as the CDs.

== Personnel ==
Uriah Heep

- Mick Box – guitar, backing vocals
- Trevor Bolder – bass guitar, backing vocals
- Phil Lanzon – keyboards, backing vocals
- Bernie Shaw – lead vocals
- Russell Gilbrook – drums, backing vocals
