= Uriah Heep =

Uriah Heep may refer to:

- Uriah Heep (David Copperfield), a character in the Charles Dickens novel David Copperfield
- Uriah Heep (band), a British rock band active since 1969
  - ...Very 'Eavy ...Very 'Umble, the band's 1970 debut album, released in the U.S. as Uriah Heep
  - Uriah Heep Live, a 1973 double live album
