= Easy Livin' (song) =

Single by Uriah Heep

from the album Demons and Wizards
- B-side: "Gypsy" "All My Life" (US)
- Released: July 1972
- Genre: Progressive rock; hard rock
- Length: 2:37
- Label: Bronze; Mercury (US)
- Songwriter: Ken Hensley
- Producer: Gerry Bron

Uriah Heep singles chronology
"The Wizard" (1972)	"Easy Livin'" (1972)	"Blind Eye" (1972)

"Easy Livin'" is a song by the British rock band Uriah Heep, released as the second single from their 1972 album Demons and Wizards. The band also shot a basic music video for the song in 1972. It was the band's first hit in the United States and the only top 40 hit there, peaking at No. 39 on the Billboard Hot 100 in September 1972. The song's greatest success came in the Netherlands, where it reached No. 5, as well as reaching the Top 20 charts in Norway, Denmark, Finland and Germany. The song also peaked at No. 25 in Canada. In 1988, the band released a live version of the song, with new vocalist Bernie Shaw, as a UK single from the album Live in Moscow.

The song appeared on the 2006 compilation Easy Livin': Singles A's & B's and as a re-recorded version on the 2009 album Celebration – Forty Years of Rock.

== Success ==
"Easy Livin'" did not reach the UK Singles Chart but was a big success in Germany, reaching #15. It had its biggest success in the Netherlands, where it charted at #5, while in Finland it reached #17, in France #35 and in Australia #75. It reached the top 40 in the US. Along with "The Wizard", "Easy Livin'" helped the band achieve stardom in many countries.

- In 1995, Radiomafia added "Easy Livin'" to their list of "Top 500 Songs".

The song has been included in most of their live sets since its introduction in 1973. It is Uriah Heep's second most covered song behind "Lady in Black".

== Track listing ==
7" single

1. "Easy Livin'" – 2:37
2. "Gypsy" – 6:37

== Cover versions ==
- James Last made an instrumental cover of the song in 1972.
- Czechoslovak band Synkopy 61 covered the song with changed lyrics in Czech as "Bílý vrány" (english: "White Crows") for their album Xantipa in 1973.
- Soviet band Aquareli covered the song with English lyrics as "Takova zhyzn'" for their album Solnechnyi luch v moem serdtce ("You Are the Sunshine of My Life") in 1979.
- The song was covered by W.A.S.P. on their 1986 album Inside the Electric Circus and on the B-side of their 1986 single "95-Nasty".
- Finnish artist Vilperin Perikunta made a cover of the song with its lyrics translated in Finnish, titled "Piirimyyjä" in 1992. Also, a Christmas single, "Joulupukki" with alternative lyrics was released in 1992.
- Angel Dust covered the song for their album Border of Reality in 1998.
- Blackfoot covered the song for their live albums Live on the King Biscuit Flower Hour in 1998 and On the Run–Live in 2004.
- Punk band The Dickies covered the song on their 1998 album Dogs from the Hare That Bit Us.
- D.C. Cooper covered the song on his 1999 solo album D.C. Cooper.
- Dreamer band has covered the song on the albums Heepsteria Extra – A Tribute to Uriah Heep in 1999 and Tribute to Uriah Heep – Heepsteria in 2000.
- Ruby the Hatchet released a version of the song in 2019 as a single, and it's become a regular part of their live set.
- Belgian crooner Helmut Lotti performed the song for his Hellmut Lotti Goes Metal show at Graspop Metal Meeting in 2023.

== In pop culture ==
Three years after the song was released, "Easy Livin'" was one of the only two songs that were featured in the 1975 film Dog Day Afternoon.

== Uses in other Uriah Heep albums ==
- 1972 Demons and Wizards - 2:37 Bronze Records
- 1973 Uriah Heep Live - Mercury Records
- 1976 The Best of Uriah Heep - 2:36 Mercury
- 1985 The Best of Uriah Heep - 2:37 Ariola
- 1987 Live in Europe 1979 - [Japan] BMG
- 1987 Live in Europe 1979 - 3:32 Sanctuary
- 1988 Lady in Black [France] - 2:36 Castle Music Ltd.
- 1988 Live in Moscow - 3:25 Castle
- 1989 The Collection - 2:39 Castle Music Ltd.
- 1994 Still 'eavy Still Proud - 3:10 Castle Music Ltd.
- 1995 Lady in Black - Pinnacle
- 1995 Platinum: The Ultimate Collection - 2:37 EMI Music Distribution
- 1996 Greatest Hits - 2:37 Castle Music Ltd
- 1996 Live January 1973 - 3:24 Castle Music Ltd.
- 1996 The Best of...Pt. 1 - 2:37 Castle Music Ltd.
- 1996 The Very Best of Uriah Heep - 3:30 Sanctuary
- 1996 Uriah Heep Live - 2:49 Castle Music Ltd.
- 1996 Uriah Heep Live - 3:00 Mercury
- 1998 Classic Heep: An Anthology - 2:35 Mercury
- 1998 The Best of...Pt. 2 - 3:25 Sanctuary
- 1999 Class Reunion: The Greatest Hits of 1972 - 2:37 Polymedia
- 1999 The Best of...Pts. 1-2 - 2:37 BMG
- 1999 Spellbinder 3:03 Steamhammer Records
- 1999 Travellers in Time: Anthology, Vol. 1 - 2:39 Castle Music Ltd.

== Various artists ==
- 1992 Sounds of the Seventies: Seventies Generation 2:37 Time/Life Music
- 1994 Hard Rock Essentials: 1970's Rebound Records
- 1994 Impossible Concert 2:43 Alex
- 1994 Rocktastic 2:34 Castle Music Ltd.
- 1994 The Finest of Hard-Rock, Vol. 1 2:33 K-Tel
- 1994 The Metal Box Set 2:37 Castle Music Ltd.
- 1995 Baby Boomer Classics: Electric Seventies 2:35 JCI
- 1995 Great Britons, Vol. 2 Special Music
- 1995 Highway Rockin': 70's Roc 4:17 Arsenal Records
- 1995 Live: The 70s 2:44 JCI Associated Labels
- 1995 Metal Mania 3:06 Griffin
- 1996 A Time of Revelation 2:36 Essential Records
- 1997 Best of Disco Rock Classics ZYX Music
- 1997 Easyriders, Vol. 2 2:35 Thump Records
- 1997 King Biscuit Flower Hour Presents In Concert 4:41 King Biscuit Entertainment
- 1998 100% Rock Target Records
- 1998 70s Heavy Hitters: Arena Rockers 1970-1974 2:38 K-Tel Distribution
- 1998 Guitar Rock: Guitar Thunder 2:39 Time/Life Music
- 1998 Hard Rock 2:39 Delta Distribution
- 1998 Harley Davidson Road Songs, Vol. 2 2:39 The Right Stuff
- 1998 Highway Rockin' 2:35 Rebound Records
- 1998 Ultimate Driving Collection: Highway Rockin' 2:36 Polygram
- 1999 40 Hits: 1970-1974 2:35 Millennium Hits (Netherlands)
- 1999 Classic Rock Traxx 2:56 Center Stage Productions
- 1999 Live at Shepperton '74 4:01 Castle Music Ltd.
- 1999 Rock Giants Vol. 1 4:46 Riviere International Records
- 1999 Rockin' 70's, Vol. 1 2:38 Madacy

== Personnel ==
- David Byron – lead vocals
- Mick Box – guitar
- Lee Kerslake – drums, percussion, backing vocals
- Gary Thain – bass guitar
- Ken Hensley – organ, backing vocals

== Charts ==
=== Weekly charts ===
Weekly chart performance for "Easy Livin'"
Chart (1972–1973)	Peak position
Australian Singles (Kent Music Report)	75
Belgium (Ultratop 50 Wallonia)	36
Canada Top Singles (RPM)	25
Denmark (Danish Singles Chart)	9
Finland (The Official Finnish Charts)	17
Netherlands (Dutch Top 40)	5
Netherlands (Single Top 100)	5
US Billboard Hot 100	39
West Germany (GfK)	15

=== Yearly charts ===
Year-end chart performance for "Easy Livin'"
Chart (1973)	Position
Netherlands (Dutch Top 40)	67
Netherlands (Single Top 100)	65
