= Live at Shepperton '74 =

Live album by Uriah Heep
- Released: 10 November 1986
- Recorded: 1974
- Studio: Shepperton Studios, Surrey, England
- Genre: Hard rock, progressive rock
- Length: 31:00
- Label: Heep

Uriah Heep live chronology
Live in Europe 1979 (1986)	Live at Shepperton '74 (1986)	Live in Moscow = Сам В Москве (1988)

Professional ratings
Review scores
Source	Rating
AllMusic	2/5 stars
Collector's Guide to Heavy Metal	6/10
Uncut	1/5 stars

Live at Shepperton '74 is a live album by British rock band Uriah Heep, released in 1986. It was recorded live in studio in 1974 for radio broadcasting.

== Track listing ==
=== Original version ===
Side A

1. "Easy Livin'" (Hensley) – 2:57
2. "So Tired" (Box, Byron, Hensley, Kerslake, Thain) – 3:58
3. "I Won't Mind" (Box, Byron, Hensley, Kerslake, Thain) – 5:41
4. "Something or Nothing" (Box, Hensley, Thain) – 2:51

Side B

1. "Stealin'" (Hensley) – 4:42
2. "Love Machine" (Hensley, Byron, Box) – 2:16
3. "The Easy Road" (Hensley) – 2:43
4. "Rock 'n' Roll Medley" – 5:52

=== 1997 version ===
1. "Easy Livin'" (Hensley) – 2:57
2. "So Tired" (Box, Byron, Hensley, Kerslake, Thain) – 3:58
3. "I Won't Mind" (Box, Byron, Hensley, Kerslake, Thain) – 5:41
4. "Sweet Freedom" (Hensley) – 6:59
5. "Something Or Nothing" (Box, Hensley, Thain) – 3:21
6. "The Easy Road" (Hensley) – 2:43
7. "Stealin'" (Hensley) – 4:42
8. "Love Machine" (Hensley, Byron, Box) – 2:16
9. "Rock 'n' Roll Medley" – 7:46
10. "Out-Takes (a. The Easy Road, b. Sleazy Livin', c. Easy Livin')" – 5:28
11. "Stealin'" (Hensley) – 6:19

== Personnel ==
Uriah Heep

- David Byron – lead vocals
- Mick Box – guitar, backing vocals
- Ken Hensley – keyboards, guitar, backing vocals
- Lee Kerslake – drums, percussion, backing vocals
- Gary Thain – bass guitar, backing vocals
