= On the Rocks (The Byron Band album) =

Studio album by The Byron Band
- Released: 1981
- Recorded: 1981
- Genre: Rock
- Length: 36:30 (LP Release); 50:04 (1993 CD Reissue)
- Label: Creole Records
- Producer: Robin George

The Byron Band chronology
| Baby Faced Killer (1978) | On the Rocks (1981) | Lost And Found (2003) |

Professional ratings
Review scores
| Source | Rating |
|---|---|
| Allmusic | 3.5/5 stars |

On the Rocks is an album by the Byron Band, taking its name from their singer, British rock vocalist David Byron.

Despite featuring Byron and lauded guitarist Robin George the album didn't achieve commercial success.

The original UK vinyl release, on Creole Records, came with a poster of the sleeve's artwork.

It was first issued on CD in 1993, by the German specialist label Repertoire Records (Repertoire REP 4341-WY). This now-deleted edition had bonus tracks, as detailed below. For completists, the CD inlay-tray was cream in colour.

The album was re-released on CD in 2010, by Angel Air Records.

== Track listing ==
All tracks composed by David Byron and Robin George; except where noted.

1. "Rebecca" – 4:01
2. "Bad Girl" – 4:52
3. "How Do You Sleep" – 6:09
4. "Little By Little" – 3:54
5. "Start Believing" – 4:04
6. "Never Say Die" – 4:25
7. "King" – 3:40
8. "Piece of My Love" – 6:47

1993 CD release bonus tracks:

1. "Every Inch of the Way" (Byron, Boone) – 3:25 / Single release
2. "Routine" – 3:52 / B-side of "Every Inch of the Way"
3. "Tired Eyes" – 2:39 / B-side of "Rebecca" single.
4. "Every Inch of the Way" (Byron, Boone) – 4:58 / Long version out-take, previously unreleased

== Personnel ==
- David Byron – vocals, executive producer, mixing
- Robin George – guitars, bass guitar on "Little By Little", mixing, producer, arranger
- Mel Collins – saxophones
- Bob Jackson – keyboards
- Roger Flavelle – bass
- John Shearer – drums, percussion
- The Powder Puffs – backing vocals

Technical

- David Baker – engineer, mixing
- Melvyn Abrahams – mastering
- Lon Goddard – cover design
