= The Magician's Birthday =

- Cover art by Roger Dean

Studio album by Uriah Heep
- Released: November 1972
- Recorded: September–October 1972
- Studio: Lansdowne (London)
- Genres: Hard rock; progressive rock; heavy metal
- Length: 37:34
- Label: Bronze
- Producer: Gerry Bron

Uriah Heep chronology
Demons and Wizards (1972)	The Magician's Birthday (1972)	Sweet Freedom (1973)

Singles from The Magician's Birthday
- 1. "Spider Woman" / "Sunrise" Released: December 1972 (EU and Japan); 2. "Sweet Lorraine" Released: January 1973 (US)

The Magician's Birthday is the fifth studio album by English rock band Uriah Heep, released in November 1972 by Bronze Records in the UK and Mercury Records in the US. The concept was "based loosely on a short story" written by keyboardist Ken Hensley in June and July 1972.

The original vinyl release was a gatefold sleeve, the front designed again by Roger Dean. The inner fold had pictures of the band, with the album itself housed in a liner on which were printed the lyrics.

The single "Sweet Lorraine" / "Blind Eye" reached No. 91 in the US Hot 100 chart. The single "Spider Woman" reached No. 14 in Germany. The Magician's Birthday was certified gold by the RIAA on 22 January 1973.

The album was remastered and reissued by Castle Communications in 1996 with two bonus tracks, and again in 2003 in an expanded deluxe edition. In 2017, Sanctuary Records released a two-disc version.

== Reception ==
Professional ratings
Review scores
Source	Rating
AllMusic	3/5 stars
Christgau's Record Guide	B−
Collector's Guide to Heavy Metal	9/10
Record Collector	3/5 stars

The Magician's Birthday received mixed reviews from contemporary critics. Mike Saunders, writing for Creem, called the album "a package full of dreck", finding the first side of the LP "listenable" despite poor production and side two downright "irritating". Village Voice critic Robert Christgau described the songs on the album as "third-hand heavy metal fantasies (...) hooked to some clean, powerful arrangements, and a good melody or two."

Modern reviews are more positive. AllMusic reviewer remarked the album's prog elements and wrote that "The Magician's Birthday never quite hits the consistent heights of Look at Yourself or Demons and Wizards, but remains a solid listen for Uriah Heep fans". Joe Geesein of Record Collector praised the musicians and the good sound of the album's reissue, but wrote that most of the songs "don't stand up quite out so well" in comparison with opener "Sunrise" or the single "Spider Woman". Canadian journalist Martin Popoff called The Magician's Birthday "another colourful, mystical journey", although "somewhat disjointed, less accessible and in total much less metallic" than previous efforts, "culminating in the band's most harrowing, nightmarish epic of them all, the ten minute title track."

== Track listings ==
All tracks are written by Ken Hensley except where noted

Side one
No.	Title	Writer(s)	Length
1.	"Sunrise"		4:04
2.	"Spider Woman"	Mick Box, David Byron, Lee Kerslake, Gary Thain	2:25
3.	"Blind Eye"		3:33
4.	"Echoes in the Dark"		4:48
5.	"Rain"		4:00

Side two
No.	Title	Writer(s)	Length
6.	"Sweet Lorraine"	Box, Byron, Thain	4:13
7.	"Tales"		4:09
8.	"The Magician's Birthday"	Box, Hensley, Kerslake	10:21

1996 remastered edition bonus tracks
No.	Title	Writer(s)	Length
9.	"Silver White Man"	Byron	3:40
10.	"Crystal Ball"	Thain	4:08

2003 Expanded Deluxe Edition bonus tracks
No.	Title	Writer(s)	Length
9.	"Crystal Ball" (out-take and previously unreleased version)	Thain	4:08
10.	"Silver White Man" (out-take and previously unreleased vocal version)	Byron	3:40
11.	"Proud Words" (previously unreleased version)		3:24
12.	"Echoes in the Dark" (edited version - previously unreleased)		4:23
13.	"Rain" (edited version - previously unreleased)		3:16
14.	"Happy Birthday" (previously unreleased)		4:44
15.	"Sunrise" (single edit - previously unreleased)		2:49
16.	"Gary's Song" (out-take - previously unreleased)	Thain	4:25
17.	"Silver White Man" (instrumental out-take)	Byron	3:43

2017 expanded deluxe edition disc 2 (all titles previously unreleased)
No.	Title	Length
1.	"Echoes in the Dark" (alternate version)	3:13
2.	"Sweet Lorraine" (alternate version)	4:56
3.	"Blind Eye" (alternate version)	5:08
4.	"Tales" (alternate version)	4:02
5.	"Silver White Man" (alternate version)	4:08
6.	"Sunrise" (alternate version)	4:25
7.	"Crystal Ball" (alternate version)	4:09
8.	"Spider Woman" (alternate version)	2:38
9.	"The Magician's Birthday" (alternate version)	10:50
10.	"Rain" (alternate version)	4:40
11.	"Silver White Man" (instrumental alternate version)	3:43
12.	"Happy Birthday" (alternate version)	4:42
13.	"Sunrise" (alternate single version)	3:36
14.	"Sweet Lorraine" (alternate single version)	3:38
15.	"Gary's Song - Crystal Ball" (alternate version)	4:23

== Personnel ==
Credits adapted from album liner notes

Uriah Heep

- David Byron – lead vocals
- Mick Box – guitars
- Ken Hensley – keyboards, guitars, Moog synthesizer, backing vocals
- Lee Kerslake – drums, percussion, backing vocals, kazoo on “The Magician’s Birthday”
- Gary Thain – bass guitar

Additional musician

- Brian Cole – pedal steel guitar on "Tales"

Production

- Gerry Bron – producer
- Peter Gallen – engineer
- Ashley Howe – assistant engineer
- Gilbert Kong – mastering
- Mike Brown and Robert Corich – remastering (1996 and 2003 reissues)

== Charts ==
=== Weekly charts ===
Weekly chart performance for The Magician's Birthday
Chart (1972–1973)	Peak position
Australian Albums (Kent Music Report)	6
Canada Top Albums/CDs (RPM)	22
Danish Albums (Hitlisten	5
Finnish Albums (The Official Finnish Charts)	1
German Albums (Offizielle Top 100)	7
Japanese Albums (Oricon)	43
Norwegian Albums (VG-lista)	5
UK Albums (Official Charts)	28
US Billboard 200	31

Chart (2017)	Peak position
UK Independent Albums (Official Charts)	38
UK Rock & Metal Albums (Official Charts)	24

=== Year-end charts ===
Year-end chart performance for The Magician's Birthday
Chart (1973)	Position
German Albums (Offizielle Top 100)	20

== Certifications and sales ==
Certifications and sales for The Magician's Birthday
Region	Certification	Certified units/sales
Sweden	—	10,000
United Kingdom (BPI)	Gold	100,000^{^}
United States (RIAA)	Gold	500,000^{^}
^{^} Shipments figures based on certification alone.
