= Demons and Wizards (Uriah Heep album) =

- Cover art by Roger Dean

Studio album by Uriah Heep
- Released: 19 May 1972
- Recorded: March–April 1972
- Studio: Lansdowne (London)
- Genres: Hard rock; progressive rock; heavy metal
- Length: 39:40
- Label: Bronze
- Producer: Gerry Bron

Uriah Heep chronology
Look at Yourself (1971)	Demons and Wizards (1972)	The Magician's Birthday (1972)

Singles from Demons and Wizards
- 1. "The Wizard" Released: March 1972; 2. "Easy Livin'" Released: July 1972

Demons and Wizards is the fourth studio album by English rock band Uriah Heep, released in May 1972 by Bronze Records in the UK and Mercury Records in the US.

== Composition and recording ==
New Zealander Gary Thain, at the time a member of Keef Hartley Band, joined Uriah Heep as a permanent member halfway through another American tour. "Gary just had a style about him, it was incredible because every bass player in the world that I've ever known has always loved his style, with those melodic bass lines," lead guitarist Mick Box commented later. Another addition, of drummer Lee Kerslake (a former bandmate of Ken Hensley's in the Gods and Toe Fat), solidified the rhythm section. Thus the "classic" Uriah Heep lineup was formed, and according to biographer Kirk Blows, "everything just clicked into place". While the album title and Roger Dean's cover art both suggested medieval fantasy, Hensley's notes declared the album to be "just a collection of our songs that we had a good time recording".

Hensley recalled: "The band was really focused at that time. We all wanted the same thing, were all willing to make the same sacrifices to achieve it and we were all very committed. It was the first album to feature that lineup and there was a magic in that combination of people that created so much energy and enthusiasm".

== Music ==
Staff writers at Classic Rock Magazine said the album is a "mixture of spacey-progressive rock, acoustic-themed moments and hard rock-boogie-shuffles."

== Cover art ==
The original vinyl release was a gatefold sleeve, the front of which was designed by Roger Dean. The inner sleeve had pictures of the band and notes by Hensley, while the liner featured printed lyrics.

== Release ==
The album reached No. 20 in the UK and No. 23 in the US. In Finland, the album hit No. 1 in May and remained on top of the charts for 14 weeks.

The songs "The Wizard" and "Easy Livin'" were released as singles in the UK and North America as well as many other markets. The latter, a defiant rocker, according to Blows, was "tailor-made for Byron's extrovert showmanship" and entered the US Billboard Hot 100 chart reaching No. 39, making it Heep's first and only American Top 40 hit. "Easy Livin'" was also a mega-hit in the Netherlands and Germany, countries which were becoming strong markets for the band. It reached a disappointing No. 75 in Australia.

Demons and Wizards was remastered and reissued by Castle Communications in 1996 with three bonus tracks, and again in 2003 in an expanded deluxe edition. In 2017, Sanctuary Records released a two-disc deluxe edition.

== Reception ==
Professional ratings
Review scores
Source	Rating
AllMusic	4.5/5 stars
Collector's Guide to Heavy Metal	10/10

Rolling Stone, which printed an infamously negative review of the band's debut album, ran a positive assessment of Demons and Wizards. Mike Saunders wrote: "These guys are good. The first side of Demons and Wizards is simply odds-on the finest high energy workout of the year, tying nose and nose with the Blue Öyster Cult...they may have started out as a thoroughly dispensable neo-Cream & Blooze outfit, but at this point Uriah Heep are shaping up into one hell of a first-rate modern rock band". According to AllMusic, the album "solidified Uriah Heep's reputation as a master of gothic-inflected heavy metal". Martin Popoff in his Collector's Guide to Heavy Metal described the album as "a sullen, solitary, contemplative sort of record, existing in a hazy flux on the more mystical side of early heavy metal" and praised the new rhythm section and especially Byron's performance, which demonstrated his "capable helmsmanship of both the most subtle of contemplative bits and the loudest of rock roars."

The album also served as partial inspiration for Hansi Kürsch and Jon Schaffer's side project Demons and Wizards.

In an interview Lee Kerslake did with Brave Words & Bloody Knuckles from 2020, when asked "Is it true that Randy Rhoads was a big fan of the Demons and Wizards album?", he replied, "Yes, he was. He loved the way the style of the music, the way it turned and the way it went. And that's why when he came up with the idea of a riff – me, Bob, and Randy – we wrote "Diary of a Madman". It was such a strong song on the album".

Staff writers at Classic Rock Magazine said that the album's blend of styles "was irresistible, even if, taken at face value, keyboard player Ken Hensley’s fantasy-oriented lyrics elicited a few chuckles."

== Track listings ==
All tracks are written by Ken Hensley except where indicated.

Side one
No.	Title	Writer(s)	Length
1.	"The Wizard"	Hensley, Mark Clarke	2:59
2.	"Traveller in Time"	David Byron, Lee Kerslake, Mick Box	3:25
3.	"Easy Livin'"		2:37
4.	"Poet's Justice"	Hensley, Box, Kerslake	4:15
5.	"Circle of Hands"		6:25

Side two
No.	Title	Writer(s)	Length
6.	"Rainbow Demon"		4:25
7.	"All My Life"	Box, Byron, Kerslake	2:44
8.	"Paradise"		5:10
9.	"The Spell" (on some CD editions, "Paradise" and "The Spell" were combined into one track)		7:32

1996 remastered edition bonus tracks
No.	Title	Writer(s)	Length
10.	"Why" (original B-side version)	Box, Byron, Hensley, Paul Newton	4:53
11.	"Why" (extended version recorded during Demons and Wizards sessions in early 1972)		7:39
12.	"Home Again to You" (demo recorded during Demons and Wizards sessions)		5:28

2003 expanded deluxe edition bonus tracks
No.	Title	Length
10.	"Why" (extended version)	10:34
11.	"Rainbow Demon" (single edit)	3:36
12.	"Proud Words on a Dusty Shelf" (outtake)	2:52
13.	"Home Again to You" (demo)	5:36
14.	"Green Eye" (demo)	3:46

2017 Expanded Deluxe Edition disc 2 (all tracks previously unreleased)
No.	Title	Length
1.	"Easy Livin'" (alternate version)	2:39
2.	"Rainbow Demon" (alternate version)	6:13
3.	"Traveller in Time" (alternate version)	3:48
4.	"Paradise" (alternate version)	5:26
5.	"The Spell" (alternate version)	8:11
6.	"All My Life" (alternate version)	3:11
7.	"Home Again To You" (alternate version)	4:53
8.	"Why" (alternate version)	13:46
9.	"The Wizard" (alternate version)	3:06
10.	"Poet's Justice" (alternate version)	4:43
11.	"Circle of Hands" (alternate version)	8:08
12.	"Proud Words" (alternate version)	2:55
13.	"Green Eye" (alternate version)	4:08
14.	"Why" (alternate single edit)	4:45

== Personnel ==
Uriah Heep

- David Byron – lead vocals
- Mick Box – guitars
- Ken Hensley – keyboards, guitars, percussion, backing vocals, co-lead vocals on "Paradise" and "The Spell"
- Lee Kerslake – drums, percussion, backing vocals
- Gary Thain – bass guitar
- Mark Clarke – bass guitar on "The Wizard" and "Why", co-lead vocals on "The Wizard"

Production

- Gerry Bron – producer
- Peter Gallen – engineer
- Ashley Howe – assistant engineer

== Charts ==
Chart (1972)	Peak position
Australian Albums (Kent Music Report)	14
Canada Top Albums/CDs (RPM)	22
Danish Albums Chart	7
Finland (The Official Finnish Charts)	1
German Albums (Offizielle Top 100)	5
Japanese Albums (Oricon)	28
Norwegian Albums (VG-lista)	5
UK Albums (Official Charts)	20
US Billboard 200	23

Chart (2017–2022)	Peak position
Swiss Albums (Schweizer Hitparade)	89
UK Independent Albums (Official Charts)	35
UK Rock & Metal Albums (Official Charts)	13

== Sales and certifications ==
Region	Certification	Certified units/sales
New Zealand (RMNZ)	Gold	7,500^{^}
Sweden	—	10,000
Switzerland	—	4,500
United States (RIAA)	Gold	500,000^{^}
^{^} Shipments figures based on certification alone.
