= Look at Yourself (song) =

Single by Uriah Heep

from the album Look at Yourself
- B-side: "What Should Be Done" "Love Machine" (US)
- Released: 3 September 1971
- Genre: Heavy metal
- Length: 5:09 (album version); 3:04 (single version)
- Label: Bronze; Mercury
- Songwriter: Ken Hensley
- Producer: Gerry Bron

Uriah Heep singles chronology
"Lady in Black" (1971)	"Look at Yourself" (1971)	"The Wizard" (1972)

"Look at Yourself" is a song by the British rock band Uriah Heep, originally released in 1971 on their third album, Look at Yourself, and the same month as a single, the first by the band in the United Kingdom. It was written and sung by Ken Hensley.

According to Hensley, the reason that he took over the lead vocals on the recording was that the band's frontman David Byron had throat problems during the recording session. However, Byron sang lead vocals on the song during Uriah Heep's live performances.

"Look at Yourself" was later included on the band's first live album, Uriah Heep Live, and on their first compilation album, The Best of Uriah Heep.

Billboard described the music as "a mirror… a driving, psychedelic flow that's sufficiently hypnotic, controlled and groovy to reflect the tastes of many youthful rockers."

The track features African percussion played by Teddy Osei, Mac Tontoh and Loughty Amao from Afro Rock group, Osibisa, who later signed with Bronze Records.

AllMusic's Donald A. Guarisco described the track as “a powerful rocker,” praising its “tribal-sounding drum jam,” deeming the track to be “a high point of 1970s heavy metal”.

== Personnel ==
- Ken Hensley – lead vocals, organ
- Mick Box – lead guitar, acoustic guitar
- Paul Newton – bass guitar
- Iain Clarke – drums
- David Byron – backing vocals

Additional musicians:

- Ted Osei, Mac Tontoh and Loughty Amao (from Osibisa) – percussion

== Charts ==
Chart (1971)	Peak position
Switzerland (Schweizer Hitparade)	4
West Germany (GfK)	33
