= Radiomafia =

Former Finnish radio channel

Radiomafia was a Finnish radio station owned by Yle and mainly directed to teenagers and young adults. It was established on 1 June 1990 and decommissioned on 12 January 2003. It was followed by YleX, with some of the programmes moved to other channels, such as YleQ, Yle Radio Suomi and Yle Radio 1.

One of the programmes aired on Radiomafia in the 1990s was a drum and bass music programme hosted by Dizzy, the alias of Juha Ponteva.
