= Look at Yourself (Uriah Heep album) =

Studio album by Uriah Heep
- Released: September 1971
- Recorded: July 1971
- Studio: Lansdowne (London)
- Genres: Hard rock; progressive rock; heavy metal
- Length: 41:14
- Label: Bronze
- Producer: Gerry Bron

Uriah Heep chronology
Salisbury (1971)	Look at Yourself (1971)	Demons and Wizards (1972)

Singles from Look at Yourself
- 1. "Look at Yourself" Released: September 1971; 2. "July Morning" Released: June 1972 (Japan)

Look at Yourself is the third studio album by English rock band Uriah Heep, released in September 1971 by Mercury Records in the US and in October 1971 by Bronze Records in the UK. It was the last Uriah Heep album to feature founding member and bassist Paul Newton.

Characterised as heavy metal and progressive rock, the album came to be viewed as a high point in the band's career and is regarded by many fans and critics as one of Uriah Heep's finest albums, along with Demons and Wizards, released the following year. The title track was released as a single in various countries, followed by "July Morning" released in Japan in 1972.

"July Morning" was the inspiration for a Bulgarian tradition, known eponymously as July Morning or "Julaya", of gathering on the beach on the Black Sea coast on the morning of 1 July to watch the sunrise.

The title track features African percussion played by Teddy Osei, Mac Tontoh and Loughty Amao from Afro Rock group, Osibisa, who later signed with Bronze Records.

Look at Yourself was remastered and reissued by Castle Communications in 1996 with three bonus tracks, and again in 2003 in an expanded deluxe edition. In 2017, Sanctuary Records released a two-disc deluxe edition.

== Cover art ==
The original cover art on the LP featured a single sleeve with a die-cut opening on the front through which a reflective foil "mirror" was seen, conveying a distorted image of the person viewing it. The idea, by guitarist Mick Box, was for the cover to directly reflect the album title, and this theme is carried through the band photos on the rear of the LP sleeve, which have also been distorted. The LP itself was housed in a heavy-duty inner card, complete with lyrics.

== Reception ==
Professional ratings
Review scores
Source	Rating
AllMusic	4/5 stars
Billboard	(positive)
Collector's Guide to Heavy Metal	10/10
Sputnikmusic	5/5 stars

In a favorable contemporary review, Billboard, noting that the band was "determined to break through", described the music in the album as "a mirror, as the hard rock five produce a driving, psychedelic flow that's sufficiently hypnotic, controlled and groovy to reflect the tastes of many youthful rockers."

Retrospective reviews have also been positive. AllMusic's Donald A. Guarisco deemed Look at Yourself to be the point where "the group perfects its fusion of heavy metal power and prog rock majesty". The album was praised for its track selection, which ranged from "powerful rockers" to the prog-oriented "July Morning", and for singer David Byron's "multi-octave, operatic style."

Look at Yourself was ranked at No. 97 in the 100 Heavy Metal albums of All Time list published by the magazine Kerrang!.

== Covers ==
- Gamma Ray covered "Look at Yourself" on their Heading for Tomorrow album (1990).
- GrimSkunk covered "Look at Yourself" on their Grim Skunk album (1994).

== Track listings ==
All tracks are written by Ken Hensley, except where noted.

Side one
No.	Title	Writer(s)	Length
1.	"Look at Yourself"		5:09
2.	"I Wanna Be Free"		4:00
3.	"July Morning"	David Byron, Hensley	10:32

Side two
No.	Title	Writer(s)	Length
4.	"Tears in My Eyes"		5:01
5.	"Shadows of Grief"	Hensley, Byron	8:39
6.	"What Should Be Done"		4:15
7.	"Love Machine"	Hensley, Mick Box, Byron	3:37

1996 remastered CD edition bonus tracks
No.	Title	Length
8.	"Look at Yourself" (single edit)	3:07
9.	"What's Within My Heart" (outtake)	5:23

2003 expanded deluxe edition bonus tracks
No.	Title	Writer(s)	Length
8.	"What's Within My Heart" (outtake from Look at Yourself sessions)		5:23
9.	"Why" (outtake from Look at Yourself sessions)	Box, Byron, Hensley, Paul Newton	11:18
10.	"Look at Yourself" (alternative single version)		3:19
11.	"Tears in My Eyes" (extended version, previously unreleased)		5:38
12.	"What Should Be Done" (outtake, original studio version)		4:26
13.	"Look at Yourself" (BBC session, previously unreleased)		4:32
14.	"What Should Be Done" (BBC session, previously unreleased)		3:26

2017 expanded deluxe edition disc 2 (all tracks previously unreleased)
No.	Title	Length
1.	"I Wanna Be Free" (Alternate Mix)	4:20
2.	"Tears in My Eyes" (Alternate Mix Extended)	5:55
3.	"What Should Be Done" (Alternate Mix)	4:35
4.	"Shadows of Grief" (Alternate Mix)	9:34
5.	"Look at Yourself" (Alternate Mix)	5:14
6.	"July Morning" (Alternate Mix)	11:18
7.	"Why Fourteen Minutes" (Alternate Mix)	14:16
8.	"Love Machine" (Alternate Mix)	3:55
9.	"What's Within My Heart" (Alternate Mix)	5:34
10.	"July Morning" (Alternate Mix, live)	11:28
11.	"Look at Yourself" (Alternate Single Version)	3:19

== Personnel ==
Uriah Heep

- David Byron – lead vocals (all but "Look at Yourself"), backing vocals on "Look at Yourself"
- Mick Box – lead guitar, acoustic guitar
- Ken Hensley – organ, piano, slide guitar, acoustic guitar, backing vocals, lead vocals on "Look at Yourself"
- Paul Newton – bass guitar
- Iain Clark – drums

Additional musicians

- Manfred Mann – Moog synthesizer on "July Morning" and "Tears in My Eyes"
- Ted Osei, Mac Tontoh and Loughty Amao (from Osibisa) – percussion on "Look at Yourself"

Production

- Gerry Bron – producer
- Peter Gallen – engineer, mixing

== Charts ==
=== Weekly charts ===
Chart (1971–72)	Peak position
Australian Albums (Kent Music Report)	16
Finnish Albums (The Official Finnish Charts)	1
German Albums (Offizielle Top 100)	11
Italian Albums (Musica e Dischi)	20
Japanese Albums (Oricon)	5
Norwegian Albums (VG-lista)	14
UK Albums (Official Charts)	39
US Billboard 200	93

Chart (2017)	Peak position
UK Independent Albums (Official Charts)	43

Chart (2021–25)	Peak position
Croatian International Albums (HDU)	29
Scottish Albums (Official Charts)	96
UK Rock & Metal Albums (Official Charts)	19

=== Year-end charts ===
Chart (1972)	Position
German Albums (Offizielle Top 100)	34

== Certifications ==
Region	Certification	Certified units/sales
Japan (RIAJ)	Gold	50,000
