= Gary Thain =

New Zealand bassist (1948–1975)

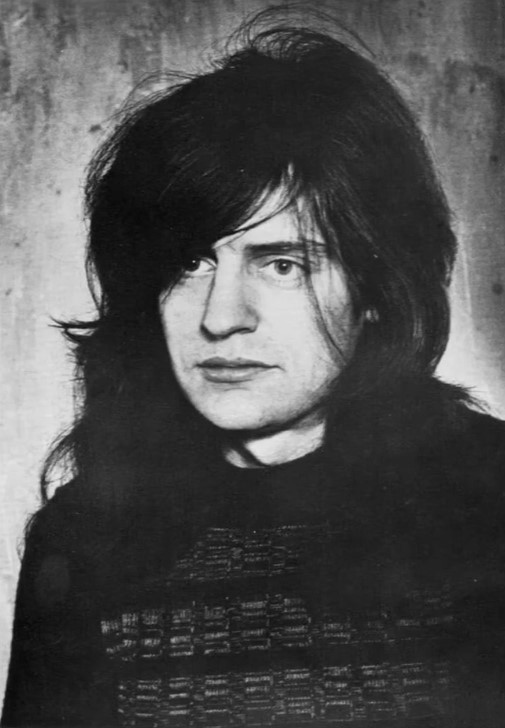

Background information
- Born: Gary Mervin Thain; 15 May 1948; Christchurch, New Zealand
- Died: 8 December 1975 (aged 27) Norwood Green, London, England
- Genres: Hard rock; progressive rock; heavy metal
- Occupations: Musician; songwriter
- Instrument: Bass
- Years active: 1963–1975
- Formerly of: Keef Hartley Band; Uriah Heep

Gary Mervin Thain (15 May 1948 – 8 December 1975) was a New Zealand bassist, best known for his work with British rock band Uriah Heep.

== Early life ==
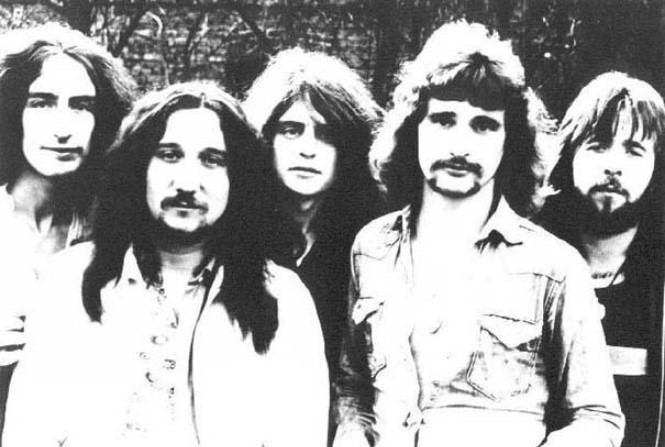
Uriah Heep in 1972 L–R: Ken Hensley, Mick Box, Gary Thain, David Byron and Lee Kerslake

Thain was born in Christchurch. He had two elder brothers, Colin and Arthur. He was described by a childhood friend as a "quiet and broody". He started performing when he was thirteen and won a talent show in high school by singing "Where Have All the Flowers Gone?".

== Career ==
=== Early career ===
He recorded three singles in Christchurch with his first band, The Strangers (not to be confused with the Australian band of the same name) with his brother Arthur (vocals and lead guitar), Graeme Ching (rhythm guitar) and Dave Beattie (Drums). At 17, he moved to Australia and joined The Secrets, which dissolved in 1966 after releasing just one single.

Later, Thain was part of the rock trio The New Nadir with Ed Carter on guitar and Mike Kowalski on drums. They were popular in Switzerland and backed female vocal trio The Toys. Along with drummer Peter Dawkins he travelled from New Zealand to London, and once jammed with Jimi Hendrix before the trio split in 1969.

=== Keef Hartley/Uriah Heep ===
Thain joined the Keef Hartley Band in 1968, performing at Woodstock in 1969. Thain toured with Hartley for four years and played on five studio albums. In 1971, they toured with Uriah Heep; Uriah Heep asked him to join the band (replacing Mark Clarke) in February 1972.

He stayed in Uriah Heep until January 1975, playing on four studio albums: Demons & Wizards, The Magician's Birthday, Sweet Freedom and Wonderworld as well as a live album, Uriah Heep Live. During his last U.S. tour with Heep, Thain was seriously injured when he suffered an electric shock at the Moody Coliseum in Dallas, Texas, on 15 September 1974. Due to his drug addiction he was not able to perform properly, and was fired by the band in early 1975 and replaced by former King Crimson bassist/vocalist John Wetton.

== Death ==
Thain was married twice and had two daughters, Karen and Natalie. He died of respiratory failure due to a heroin overdose, on 8 December 1975, aged 27, at his flat in Norwood Green in London.

== Albums discography ==
=== Champion Jack Dupree ===
- Scoobydoobydoo (1969)

=== Martha Velez ===
- Fiends and Angels (1970)

=== Keef Hartley Band ===
- Halfbreed (1969)
- The Battle of North West Six (1969)
- The Time is Near (1970)
- Little Big Band Live at The Marquee 1971 (1971)
- Overdog (1971)
- Seventy-Second Brave (1972)

=== Miller Anderson ===
- Bright City (1971)

=== Pete York Percussion Band ===
- The Pete York Percussion Band (1972)

=== Uriah Heep ===
- Demons and Wizards (1972)
- The Magician's Birthday (1972)
- Uriah Heep Live (1973)
- Sweet Freedom (1973)
- Wonderworld (1974)
- Live at Shepperton '74 (1986)

=== Ken Hensley ===
- Proud Words on a Dusty Shelf (1973)

=== Me and the Others / The New Nadir ===
- Uncovered (2009)

== Singles discography ==
=== The Strangers ===
- 1963: "My Blue Heaven"/"The Dark at the Top of The Stairs"
- 1964: "Pretend"/"Alright"
- 1965: "Can't Help Forgiving You"/"I'll Never Be Blue"

=== The Secrets ===
- 1965: "It's You"/"You're Wrong"
- 1966: "Me and the Others"/"Love Is Not a Game"

=== Champion Jack Dupree ===
- 1969: "Ba La Fouche" (MT/Jack Dupree)/"Kansas City" (Jerry Leiber and Mike Stoller)

=== Martha Velez ===
- 1969: "Tell Mama"/"Swamp Man"

=== Keef Hartley Band ===
- 1969: "Don't Be Afraid"/"Hickory"
- 1969: "Halfbreed"/"Waiting Around"
- 1969: "Just to Cry"/"Leave It 'Til The Morning"
- 1969: "Plain Talkin'"/"We Are All the Same"
- 1970: "Roundabout"/"Roundabout pt 2"
- 1973: "Dance to the Music"/"You and Me"

== See also ==
- 27 Club
