= Ken Hensley =

English musician (1945–2020)

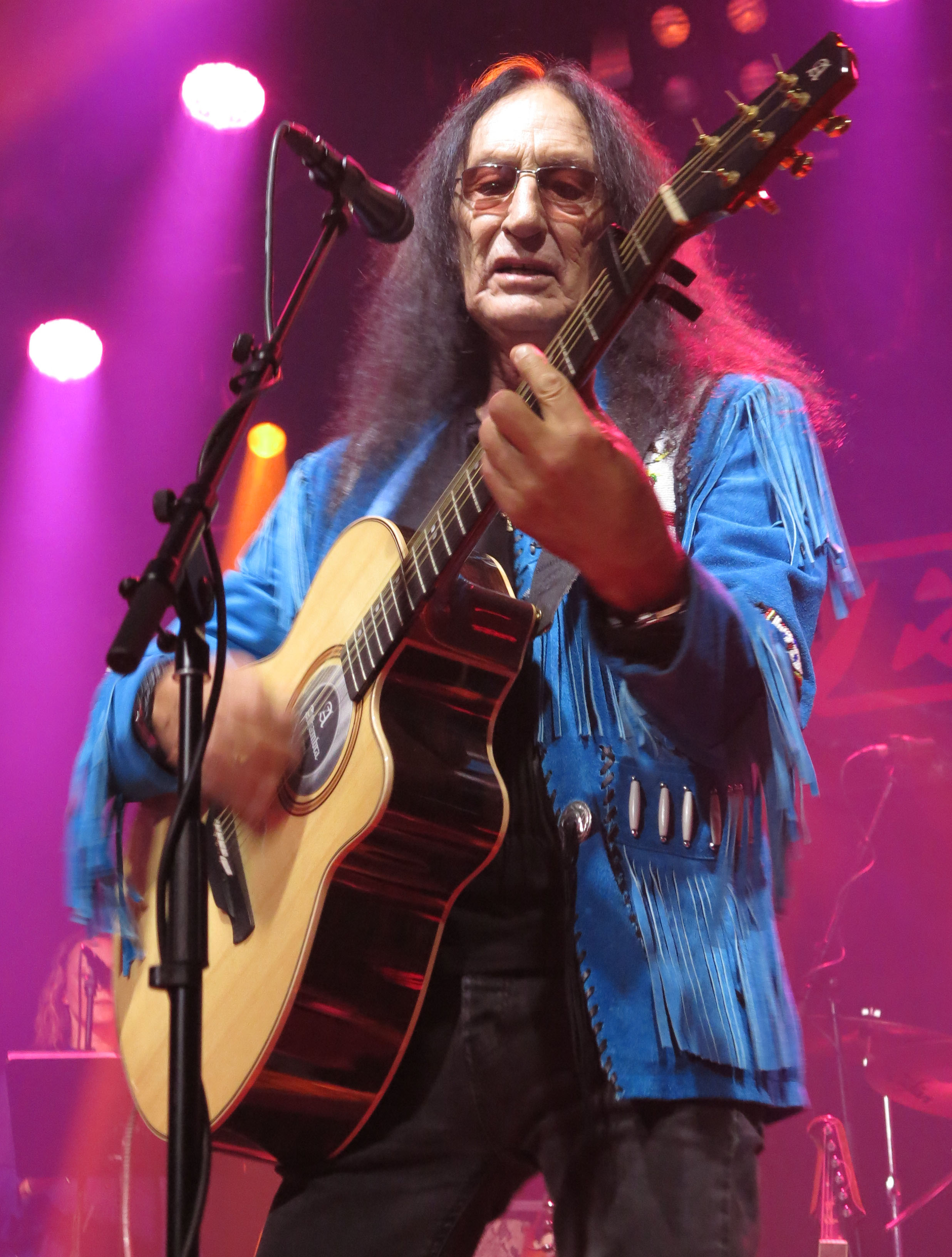
- Ken Hensley at the Tavastia Club, Helsinki, in 2019

Background information
- Born: Kenneth William David Hensley; 24 August 1945; Plumstead, London, England
- Origin: Stevenage, Hertfordshire, England
- Died: 4 November 2020 (aged 75) Agost, Alicante, Spain
- Genres: Hard rock; progressive rock; soft rock; heavy metal; southern rock
- Occupations: Musician; singer; songwriter; record producer
- Instruments: Keyboards; vocals; guitar
- Years active: 1960–2020
- Labels: Bronze; Repertoire; Mystic
- Website: ken-hensley.com

Kenneth William David Hensley (24 August 1945 – 4 November 2020) was an English musician, singer, songwriter and producer, best known for his work with Uriah Heep during the 1970s.

He wrote or co-wrote the majority of Uriah Heep's songs during this period, including the singles "Lady in Black" (on which he sang lead vocals), "Easy Livin'" and "Stealin'", as well as "Look at Yourself" and "Free Me".

== Early life ==
Born in Plumstead, south-east London, Hensley moved with his parents, three brothers and sister to Stevenage, Hertfordshire, in 1945. He learned how to play guitar at the age of 12 from a Bert Weedon manual.

== Career ==
=== 1960s ===
His first gig was at The Mentmore Pen Factory, in Stevenage (September 1960). After that, he played with The Blue Notes, Ken and the Cousins and Kit and the Saracens (1962). In 1963, this band evolved into The Jimmy Brown Sound, and they recorded some now lost songs. At this time, Hensley's first "professional" opportunity almost came about: they were to back Ben E. King on a British visit, but it never happened.

In early 1965, Hensley formed a band called The Gods, with the young guitarist Mick Taylor, well known later for his work with John Mayall and The Rolling Stones. Hensley wrote most of the material, sang and played the Hammond B3 organ as the band already had Taylor on guitar. The Gods' line-up included, at one time or another, vocalist and guitar/bass player Greg Lake (later of King Crimson and Emerson, Lake & Palmer), bass player Paul Newton (later the first Uriah Heep bassist), drummer Lee Kerslake (later also of Heep), bassist John Glascock (later of Jethro Tull), and guitarist Joe Konas. In early 1968, they signed with Columbia Records and recorded two LPs and several singles.

Hensley also then played on a one-album side project of The Gods initially planned to become their third album, but was recorded and eventually released in 1969/1970 under the moniker Head Machine's Orgasm. The album was produced by David Paramor (producer of "The Gods") and both Hensley and Kerslake featured, along with John Glascock on bass, Brian Glascock on drums, and David Paramor on vocals, all under pseudonyms.

Hensley played mostly guitar again, as in the beginning of his career. Although Paramor was credited as composer, the songs bear many of Hensley's influences. The album was released before Hensley joined Toe Fat, and might almost be considered a prototype for the harder side of his future work in Uriah Heep. The band eventually split but Cliff Bennett, from the Rebel Rousers, decided to move in a more "progressive" direction and asked The Gods to join him. Under the name Toe Fat they released two LPs, but only the first featured Hensley.

=== Uriah Heep ===
Paul Newton asked Hensley (Christmas 1969) to join forces in Spice, as they were looking for a keyboard player to make their sound less bluesy and more progressive, in keeping with the current trend. In January 1970, Spice changed its name into Uriah Heep. Also in the line-up were guitarist Mick Box and vocalist David Byron. With Uriah Heep, Hensley found a place to develop and showcase his songwriting and lyrical abilities as well as his keyboard and guitar playing.

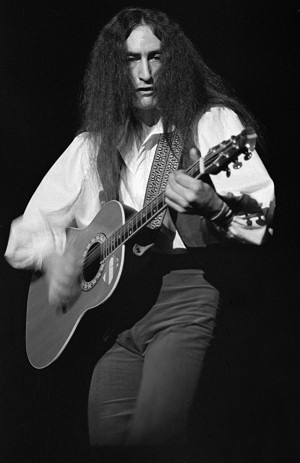
Hensley performing with Uriah Heep in 1977

The band's "classic" line-up featured Hensley, Byron, Box, Kerslake and bassist Gary Thain, plus the management provided by Gerry Bron (Bronze Records). During his time with Heep (1970–1980), they recorded 13 studio albums, and the live album Uriah Heep Live – January 1973 along with many compilations and singles. Hensley also recorded his first two solo albums, Proud Words on a Dusty Shelf (1973) and Eager To Please (1975) during this time. He was supported mainly by Mark Clarke and Bugs Pemberton.

In 1980 Hensley left the band, unhappy with the musical direction they had chosen. After trying to put a new band together in the UK (Shotgun), he later moved to the US and played a few gigs in North America as The Ken Hensley Band. Around this time he released his third solo LP, Free Spirit (1980).

=== 1980s and 1990s ===
In 1982, Hensley joined Blackfoot, a hard rock Florida-based band. With them, he recorded two albums (1983's Siogo and 1984's Vertical Smiles). Although the group achieved some success, Hensley left after Bron informed him of Heep vocalist David Byron's death in 1985.

After 1985, Hensley lived in semi-retirement in St Louis, Missouri, U.S., making a few appearances with W.A.S.P., Cinderella and others. Hensley also owned "The Attic" Recording studio in St. Louis.

In 1994, From Time To Time, a collection of lost recordings, was released featuring rare songs recorded by Hensley between 1971 and 1982, as well as some early versions of Heep's classic songs, played by Hensley and his roommates at that time, namely guitarist Paul Kossoff and drummer Simon Kirke (both of Free). Other musicians on the songs were bassist Boz Burrell (King Crimson and Bad Company), guitarist Mick Ralphs (Mott the Hoople, Bad Company), drummers Ian Paice (Deep Purple, Whitesnake) and Kenney Jones (The Small Faces, The Faces, The Who), as well as Jeff Allen, Denny Ball, Trevor Bolder, Mark Clarke, B. J. Cole, Pat Leonard, Dave Markee, Linton Naiff, Warren "Bugs" Pemberton, Henry Spinetti, Liza Strike, and Clare Torry.

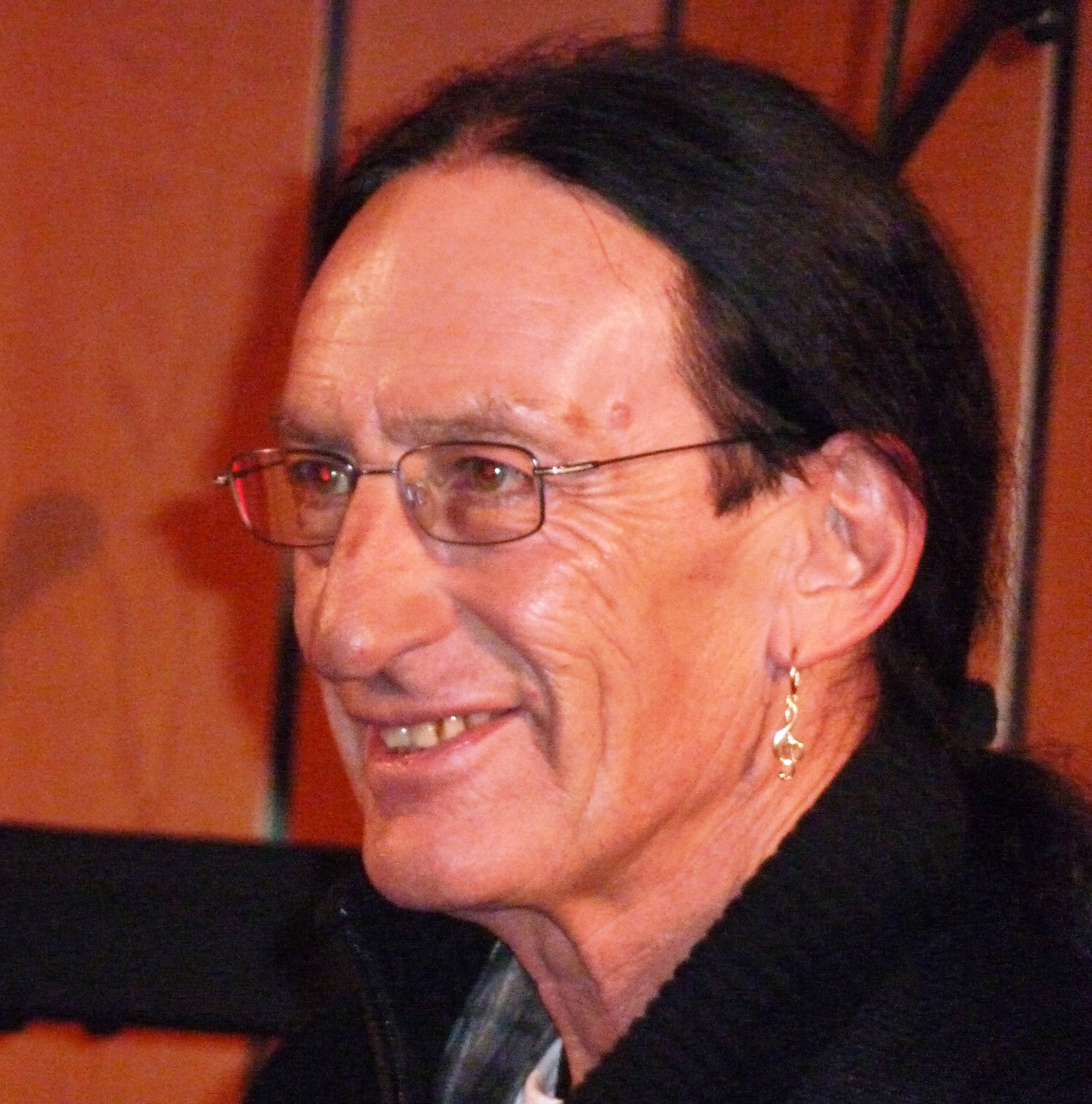
Hensley at the Creativity World Forum 2009 in Ludwigsburg, Germany

In 1997 Hensley established The Upper Room Studios in St. Louis, Missouri, where he was involved with several projects including A Glimpse of Glory, together with his band Visible Faith produced by Hensley and engineered by chief engineer Bud Martin. In 1999, Hensley's musical activities began to increase, besides his work with St Louis Music. He recorded an album.

=== 2000s — 2020s ===
During the fourth Uriah Heep Annual Convention in London, May 2000, plans were made for a one-off concert by the so-called "Hensley/Lawton Band". Hensley was joined by former Uriah Heep singer John Lawton, their first public collaboration since the latter's departure from Uriah Heep in 1979. With them were Paul Newton (the band's original bassist) and two members of Lawton's band, Reuben Kane on lead guitar and Justin Shefford on drums. They played a set of old Uriah Heep classics and some of Hensley's solo songs, and the concert was recorded for a CD release, followed by an extensive tour of Europe during 2001, culminating with a concert on 12 May in Hamburg, Germany, featuring a full orchestra and a new rendition of Heep's classic song "Salisbury". After the tour, both Hensley and Lawton returned to their respective solo careers.

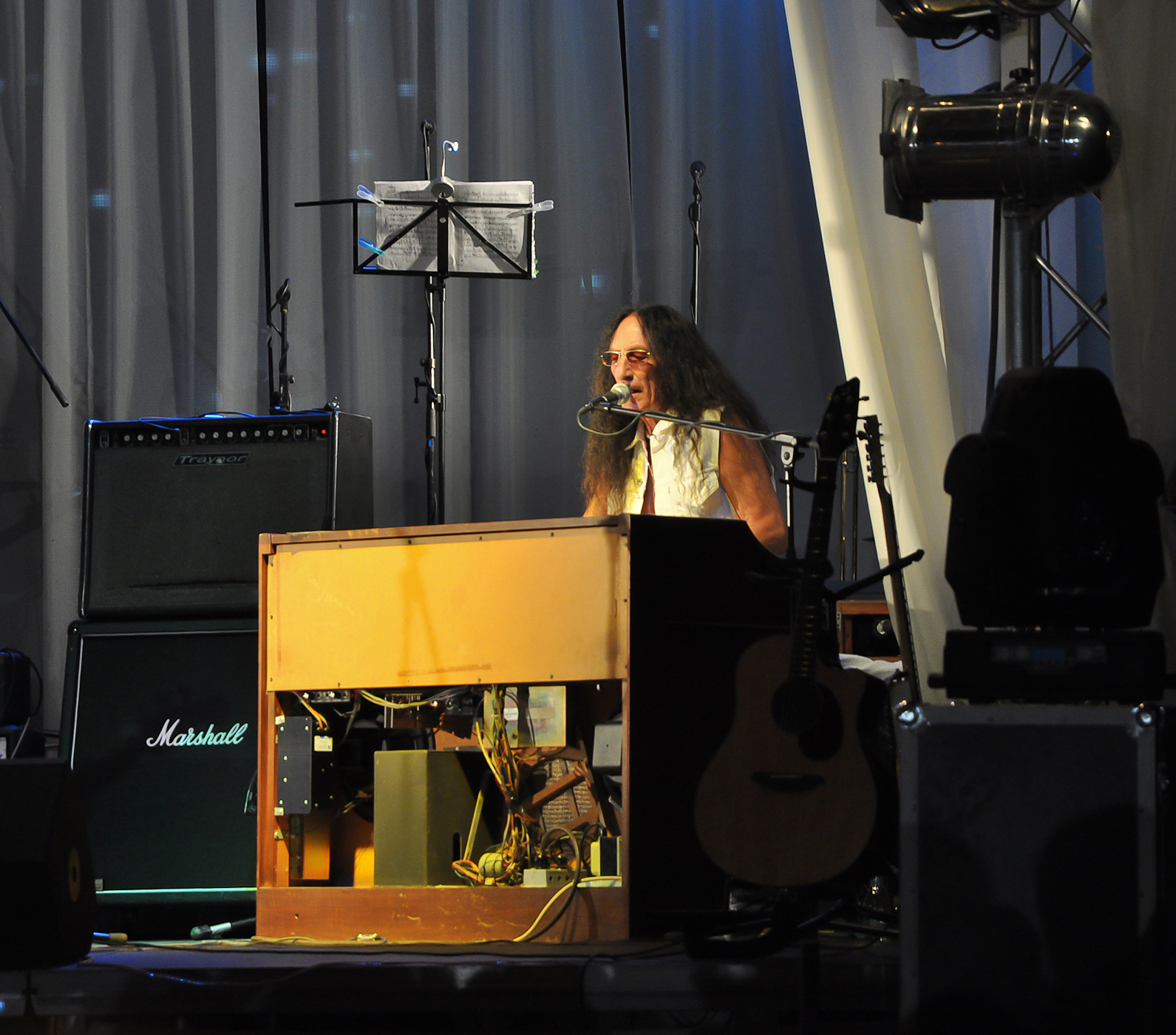
Ken Hensley performing in Sofia with the Bulgarian rock band Sunrize during their "Rock on the Rocks Tour 2011"

On 7 December 2001, both Lawton and Hensley appeared on stage with Uriah Heep during the annual Magician's Birthday Party at the Shepherd's Bush Empire in London. This concert was recorded and released as a CD/DVD.

Running Blind, his first effort in 21 years, was released worldwide in 2002, and followed by a world tour with his band called "Free Spirit", that included Dave Kilminster (guitar), Andy Pyle (bass) and Pete Riley (drums).

In September 2008, Hensley went on stage again with former Heep bandmates Lawton, Kerslake and Newton, along with ex-Focus guitarist Jan Dumée, for the "Heepvention 2008" fans meeting.

Hensley continued to write and record a series of new albums, beginning with a collection of songs under the title of Love & Other Mysteries, recorded near his home in Spain and followed in 2011 by Faster, his first studio recording of new songs with his live band, Live Fire. A CD of one of his solo concerts was released by Cherry Red Records in 2013, shortly followed by a live CD recorded with Live Fire during a September/October tour. Trouble, an album of 10 new songs recorded with a revised Live Fire line-up, was released, again by Cherry Red, in September the same year.

== Legacy ==
W.A.S.P.'s frontman Blackie Lawless stated that "Ken Hensley wrote the rule book for heavy metal keyboards as far as I'm concerned."

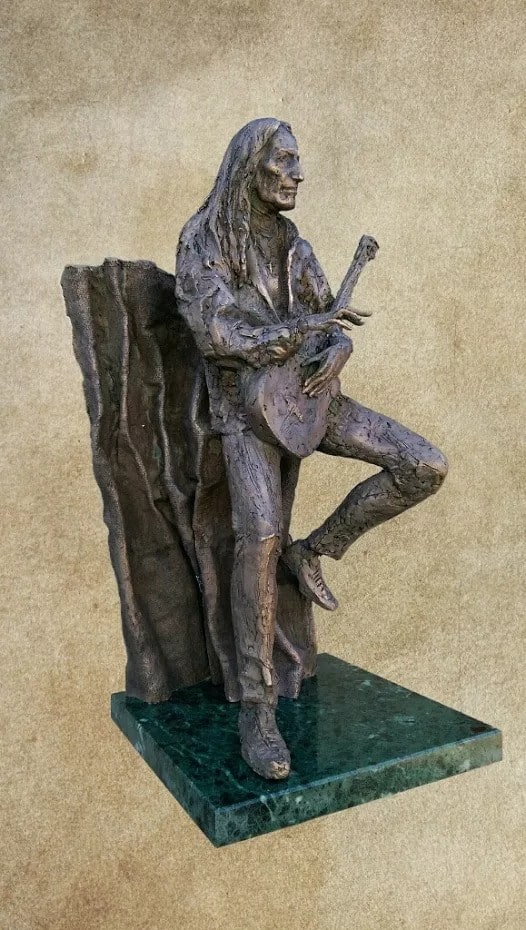
Ken Hensley bronze portrait by sculptor Giennadij Jerszow 2014

In 2014, Polish and Ukrainian sculptor Giennadij Jerszow created a bronze portrait of Hensley.

== Personal life and death ==
In later years, Hensley and his fourth wife Monica lived in the village of Agost near Alicante in Spain.

Hensley died on 4 November 2020, at the age of 75 following a short illness. He was cremated in Spain. He had finished an album titled My Book of Answers before his death, that was released on 5 March 2021.

In July of 2026 a new album, titled 'A Little Closer' was announced. This was recorded in 2019, but not announced for release until recently.

== Bands and guest appearances ==
- The Gods (1965–1969) – lead vocals, keyboards, occasional guitar
- Toe Fat (1969–1970) – guitars, backing vocals, keyboards
- Head Machine (1970) – lead vocals, keyboards, guitars (This was a one-album project put together by a producer)
- Uriah Heep (1970–1980) – keyboards, backing and lead vocals, acoustic and slide guitar, primary songwriter
- Weed (1971) – lead vocals, keyboards, guitars (A one-album side project for Hensley. The other musicians playing on the album are thought to have been from a German band called Virus)
- Shotgun (1981) – lead vocals, keyboards, guitars
- Ken Hensley Band (1981) – lead vocals, keyboards, guitars
- Blackfoot (1982–1985) – keyboards, backing vocals, slide guitar
- Ken Hensley & Visible Faith (1999) – lead vocals, keyboards, guitars
- Hensley/Lawton Band (2000–2001) – keyboards, guitars, lead and backing vocals
- Ken Hensley/John Wetton (2001) – keyboards, guitars, lead and backing vocals
- Ken Hensley & Free Spirit (2002) – keyboards, guitars, lead vocals
- Ayreon (2004) - Hammond solo on the track 'Day Sixteen: Loser' on the album The Human Equation
- Ken Hensley & The Viking All-Stars Band (2005) – keyboards, guitars, lead vocals
- Ken Hensley & Live Fire (2006–2020) – keyboards, guitars, lead vocals
- Sunrize (2011) – Touring together with the Bulgarian rock band Sunrize during their Rock on the Rocks tour 2011.

== Discography ==
=== Solo albums ===
- Proud Words on a Dusty Shelf (1973) - AUS No. 57
- Eager to Please (1975)
- Free Spirit (1980)
- The Best of Ken Hensley (compilation, 1990)
- From Time to Time (1994)
- A Glimpse of Glory (1999)
- Ken Hensley Anthology (compilation, 2000)
- Running Blind (2002)
- The Last Dance (2003)
- The Wizard's Diary Vol. 1 (compilation, CD/DVD, 2004)
- Cold Autumn Sunday (2005)
- Elements – Anthology 1968 to 2005 (compilation, 2006)
- Inside the Mystery (compilation, 2006)
- Blood on the Highway (The Ken Hensley Story - When Too Many Dreams Come True) (2006)
- Ken Hensley with Live Fire In Concert / Norway (live at Folkets Hus, Gressvik, Norway, 28 November 2005; DVD, 2007)
- Blood on the Highway (live at the Fabrik, Hamburg, Germany, 22 May 2007; DVD, 2008)
- Love & Other Mysteries (2012)
- Live Tales (live, 2013)
- Rare & Timeless (compilation, 2018)
- My Book of Answers (2021)

=== With The Gods ===
- Genesis (1968)
- To Samuel A Son (1969)
- The Gods Featuring Ken Hensley (1976)

=== With Head Machine ===
- Orgasm (1969)

=== With Toe Fat ===
- Toe Fat (1970)

=== With Uriah Heep ===
- ...Very 'Eavy ...Very 'Umble (1970)
- Salisbury (1971)
- Look at Yourself (1971)
- Demons and Wizards (1972)
- The Magician's Birthday (1972)
- Uriah Heep Live (live, 1973)
- Sweet Freedom (1973)
- Wonderworld (1974)
- Return to Fantasy (1975)
- The Best of Uriah Heep (compilation, 1975)
- High and Mighty (1976)
- Firefly (1977)
- Innocent Victim (1977)
- Fallen Angel (1978)
- Conquest (1980)
- Live at Shepperton '74 (live, 1986)
- Live in Europe 1979 (live, 1986)
- Still 'Eavy Still Proud (compilation, 1990)
- Rarities From The Bronze Age (compilation, 1991)
- The Lansdowne Tapes (1993)
- A Time of Revelation (1996)
- Live in San Diego 1974 (live, 1997)
- The Magician's Birthday Party (live, recorded 2001, released 2002)
- Chapter & Verse – The Uriah Heep Story (compilation, 2005)

=== With Weed ===
- Weed...! (1971)

=== With Blackfoot ===
- Siogo (1983)
- Vertical Smiles (1984)
- KBFH Presents Blackfoot Live 1983 (live, 1998)

=== With John Lawton ===
- The Return (live, 2001)
- Salisbury Live (live, 2001)

=== With John Wetton ===
- More Than Conquerors (live, 2002)
- One Way Or Another (live, 2002)

=== With Ken Hensley & Live Fire ===
- Faster (2011)
- Live Fire LIVE (live, 2013)
- Trouble (2013)
- Live in Russia (live, 2019)

== Books ==
- Uriah Heep – 10 Jahre Rockmusik, Markus Ott and Ken Hensley (1980)
- When Too Many Dreams Come True – The Ken Hensley Story (2006)
- Easy Livin' Ken Hensleyn vuodet 1970-1980, Mika Järvinen (2013)
- The Legend - Our Brother, Trevor Hensley (2024)
