= Lee Kerslake =

English drummer (1947–2020)

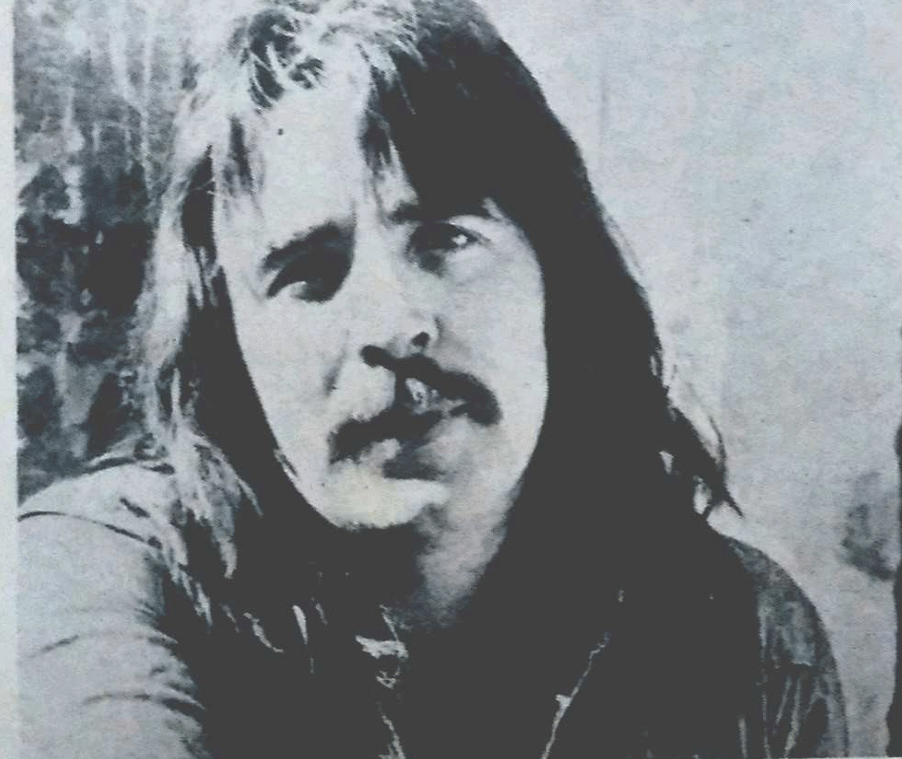
- Kerslake in 1974

Background information
- Also known as: The Bear
- Born: Lee Gary Kerslake; 16 April 1947; Bournemouth, Hampshire, England
- Died: 19 September 2020 (aged 73)
- Genres: Hard rock; progressive rock; art rock; Southern rock; heavy metal
- Occupation: Drummer
- Years active: 1968–2020
- Labels: Bronze; Mercury; Warner Bros.

Lee Gary Kerslake (16 April 1947 – 19 September 2020) was an English musician, best known as the longtime drummer and backing vocalist for the rock band Uriah Heep and for his work with Ozzy Osbourne in the early 1980s.

== Biography ==
=== Early life and career ===
Kerslake was born in Bournemouth, Hampshire (now Dorset). At age 11, he began playing drums and got his first professional gig with The Gods in 1969, going on to record three albums with the band. He later played with Toe Fat and National Head Band before linking up with Uriah Heep in November 1971.

=== Uriah Heep ===
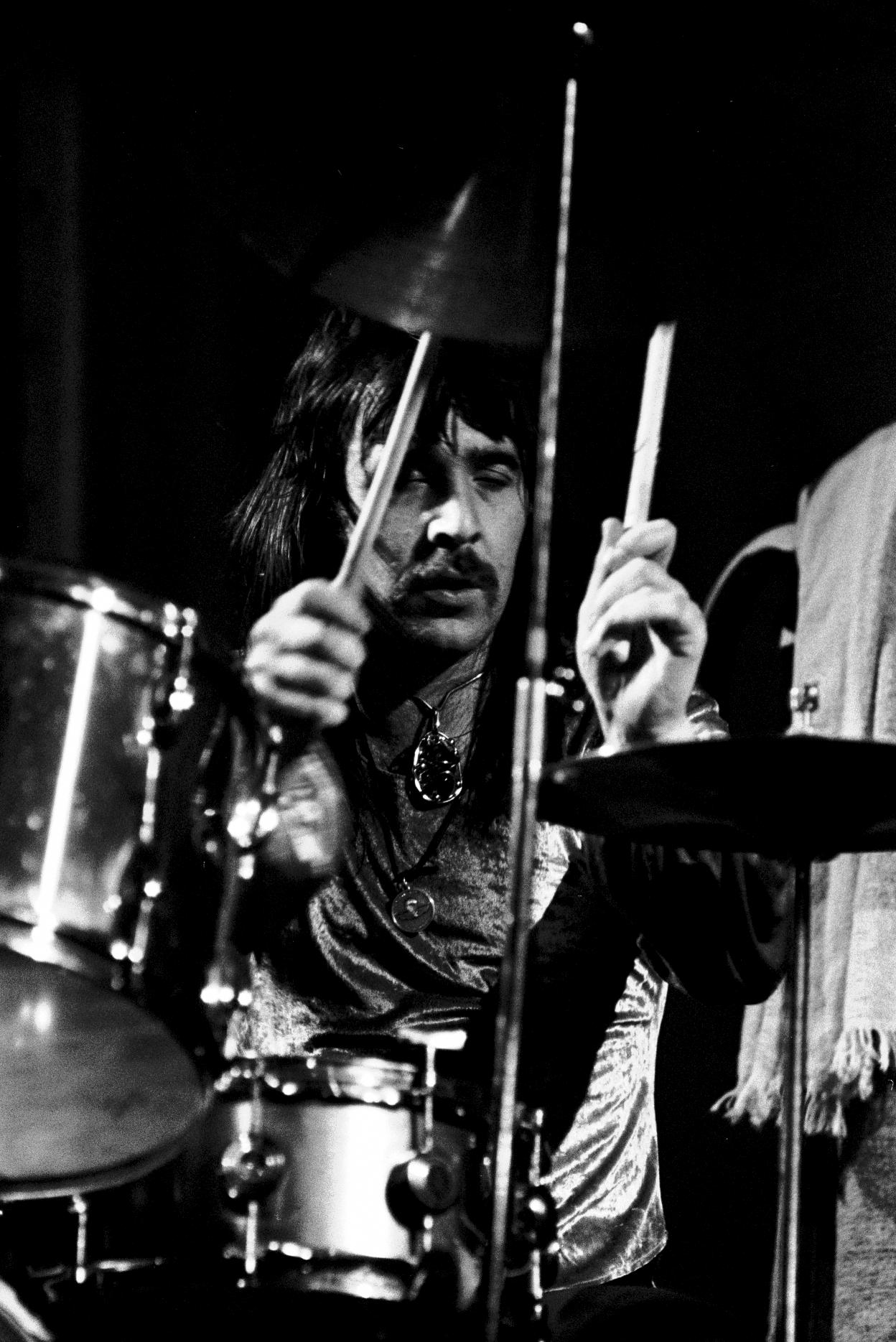
Kerslake with Uriah Heep in 1973

Kerslake first appeared with Uriah Heep on their 1972 album Demons and Wizards and went on to record nine studio records, as well as a live album, with the band before departing in 1978 after the Fallen Angels tour. He also played on David Byron's and Ken Hensley's solo albums, among other efforts during this period. On the Firefly album he was credited as Lee "The Bear" Kerslake, the nickname being a reference to his beard growth and overall solid physical build.

After achieving commercial success with Ozzy Osbourne in the early 1980s, Kerslake rejoined Uriah Heep in time for their 1982 Abominog album, regarded as a comeback album for the band by many critics. He would remain with the band until January 2007, appearing on an additional six studio albums, bringing his total contribution to Uriah Heep's output to 17 studio albums, along with several live albums.

=== Ozzy Osbourne ===
In 1980, Kerslake met ex-Black Sabbath vocalist Ozzy Osbourne by chance in a lift at the Kings Cross Hotel in Australia. "He was in one corner with his bodyguard and his manager, and I was in the other corner with mine. Rather funny". They would soon form a band and release the album Blizzard of Ozz with bassist Bob Daisley and guitarist Randy Rhoads, though the band would soon become an Ozzy Osbourne solo project due to a management decision. Kerslake's work can be heard on Osbourne's first two solo albums, Blizzard of Ozz and Diary of a Madman, as well as the 1980 Live EP and parts of the 1987 Tribute live album.

Kerslake left Osbourne's band in early 1981 to care for his mother, who had fallen ill. On the Diary of a Madman notes, Kerslake and bassist Bob Daisley were not credited, with drummer Tommy Aldridge and bassist Rudy Sarzo instead receiving credit. Aldridge has stated of the Diary of a Madman album, "I think it's pretty obvious that it's not my drumming on that album. I have never taken credit for that recording and have always given Lee Kerslake, whenever asked or interviewed, the credit he rightly deserves."

=== Later career ===
In 1998, Kerslake and Daisley filed a joint lawsuit against Osbourne and his wife/manager Sharon, seeking royalties and songwriting credits for their contributions to the Blizzard of Ozz and Diary of a Madman albums. The Osbourne camp responded by removing Kerslake and Daisley's performances from the 2002 reissues of both albums and having them re-recorded by bassist Robert Trujillo and drummer Mike Bordin. Due to fan objection, the original bass and drum tracks were restored when the albums were again reissued in 2011.

Kerslake was unsure why the Osbourne camp had treated him so negatively: "The only thing I could ever recall was once Ozzy had asked me to speak to her (Sharon) on his behalf regarding the two shows in New York in one night as Ozzy said 'I can't do two shows in one night — not with my voice!' He told me to tell her. I did as he said. I would have died for Ozzy as we were a band and I loved him as such. Because I broke the news to her, she's hated my guts", he recalled in 2011. Entertainment attorney Steven Machat, who was involved in the deal Osbourne signed with Jet Records, said in his 2011 book Gods, Gangsters and Honour: A Rock 'n' Roll Odyssey that Sharon was not happy with the level of creative input that Daisley and Kerslake had in the band and wanted Ozzy to have full control. He surmises this led to the split and any ill-will she has since harboured for the drummer. Album producer Max Norman, who produced both albums, concurs that Daisley and Kerslake made considerable songwriting contributions during their time in the band, while also noting that the Osbourne camp "might want to dispute that now."

In 2003, Kerslake became involved in supergroup Living Loud, a hard rock project also featuring bassist Bob Daisley, guitarist Steve Morse and singer Jimmy Barnes. Keyboardist Don Airey made a guest appearance. The group released a debut self-titled CD, featuring covers of several Daisley/Kerslake penned Ozzy Osbourne tracks.

In 2003, Kerslake and Daisley's lawsuit was dismissed by the United States District Court in Los Angeles. This dismissal was upheld by the United States Court of Appeals for the Ninth Circuit. Kerslake performed with his own band the "Lee Kerslake Band", guested with various bands and regularly joined ex-Heep members Ken Hensley and Paul Newton in "Uriah Heep Legends".

In early 2007 it was announced on the Uriah Heep website that Kerslake left the band 'due to ongoing health problems'. Kerslake was semi-retired because of illness.

In 2015 Kerslake started to record his first solo album Eleventeen which came from when he used to count as a child and could not understand why there was not an eleventeen.

In 2016 Lee teamed up with Tayla Goodman from London Bridge films, whom he met while dog-walking in Crystal Palace park and together with Pyrojunkies' Shane Cauldwell, they produced a music video for his solo album Celia Seanna.

In 2018 Kerslake and Goodman started making a documentary on Lee's life and his bucket list. Lee insisted that he wanted to leave a legacy for his fans and some money for his wife Sue. The documentary will feature Ian Paice from Deep Purple, Joe Elliott from Def Leppard, Mick Box from Uriah Heep, Nicko McBrain from Iron Maiden, and Gene Simmons from Kiss. The documentary was released in 2023, after his death, as Lee Kerslake: Not On The Heep.

=== Health issues and death ===
In December 2018, Kerslake revealed that he was battling prostate cancer, saying that "the doctor gave me about eight months to live". He further stated that five years previously, he had been given four years to live. Kerslake's further health complications included psoriasis, psoriatic arthritis and two heart murmurs.

Kerslake revealed that it was his final wish to receive the platinum album certifications for the Blizzard of Ozz and Diary of a Madman albums that he had worked on, and Osbourne granted that wish. Kerslake wrote a letter to Osbourne, informing him of his ill health and desire to receive the records. Kerslake subsequently received his platinum plaques.

On 14 December 2018, Kerslake joined Uriah Heep onstage at the Shepherd's Bush Empire, contributing percussion and vocals to "Lady in Black".

On 19 September 2020, Kerslake died from cancer at age 73. He had completed recording a solo album before his death, titled Eleventeen, posthumously released on 26 February 2021. He was survived by his wife, Susan, and two grown children.

== Discography ==
=== Solo ===
- Eleventeen (2021)

=== With The Gods ===
- Genesis (1968)
- To Samuel a Son (1969)

=== With Head Machine ===
- Orgasm (1970)

=== With Toe Fat ===
- Toe Fat (1970)

=== With National Head Band ===
- Albert One (1971)

=== With Uriah Heep ===
- Demons and Wizards (1972)
- The Magician's Birthday (1972)
- Uriah Heep Live (1973)
- Sweet Freedom (1973)
- Wonderworld (1974)
- Return to Fantasy (1975)
- High and Mighty (1976)
- Firefly (1977)
- Innocent Victim (1977)
- Fallen Angel (1978)
- Abominog (1982)
- Head First (1983)
- Equator (1985)
- Live at Shepperton '74 (1986) – recorded 1974
- Live in Europe 1979 (1986) – recorded 1979
- Live in Moscow (1988)
- Raging Silence (1989)
- Different World (1991)
- Sea of Light (1995)
- Spellbinder Live (1996)
- King Biscuit Flower Hour Presents in Concert (1974) (1997)
- Sonic Origami (1998)
- Future Echoes of the Past (2000)
- Acoustically Driven (2001)
- Electrically Driven (2001)
- The Magician's Birthday Party (2002)
- Live in the USA (2003)
- Magic Night (2004)
- Between Two Worlds (2005)

=== With Ken Hensley ===
- Proud Words on a Dusty Shelf (1973)

=== With David Byron ===
- Take No Prisoners (1975)
- Man of Yesterday: The Anthology (2005)

=== With Ozzy Osbourne ===
- Blizzard of Ozz (1980)
- Diary of a Madman (1981)
- Tribute (1987) (on two tracks)
- The Ozzman Cometh (1997) (not on the current pressing)

=== With Living Loud ===
- Living Loud (2003/04)
- Live in Sydney 2004 (2005, 2CD/DVD)

=== With Berggren Kerslake Band ===
- The Sun Has Gone Hazy (2014)
