= David Byron =

British singer (1947–1985)

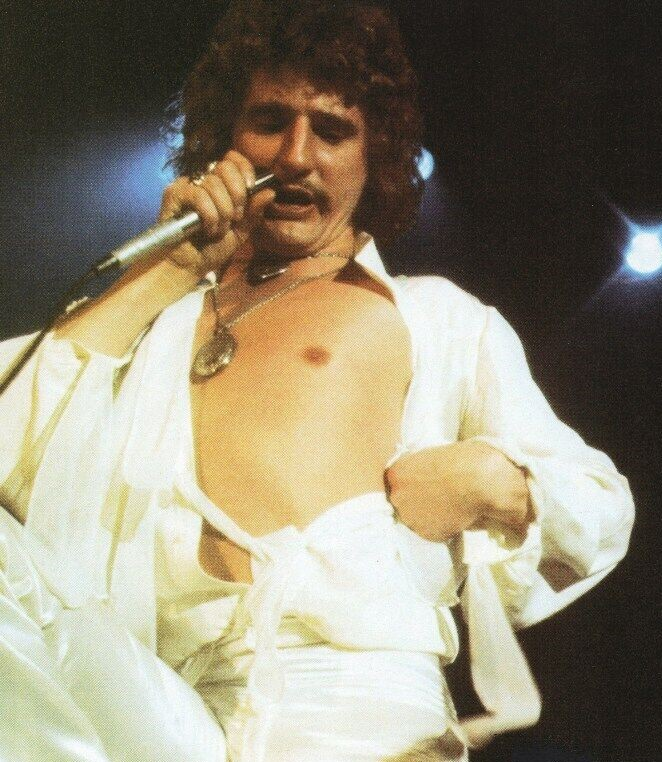

Background information
- Born: David Garrick; 29 January 1947; Epping, Essex, England
- Died: 28 February 1985 (aged 38) Berkshire, England
- Genres: Hard rock; psychedelic rock; progressive rock; art rock; soft rock; heavy metal
- Occupations: Singer; songwriter
- Years active: 1961–1985
- Formerly of: Spice; Uriah Heep; Rough Diamond; The Byron Band

David Garrick (29 January 1947 – 28 February 1985), better known by his stage name David Byron, was a British singer who was best known in the early 1970s as the original lead vocalist of the rock band Uriah Heep and their hit singles "Easy Livin'" (1972) and "Stealin'" (1973). Byron possessed a powerful operatic voice and exuded a flamboyant stage presence.

== Early life (1947–1969) ==
David Garrick was born in Essex to David James Garrick and Rosetta Caroline Florence Purkis, who wed in the late 1930s. His father worked as a compositor, type-setting for a London based printing firm called Odhams Press. He enrolled into Normanhurst Infant School in 1952.

Byron was educated at Forest School, Walthamstow, from 1958 to 1964, where, as a popular pupil, he excelled at sports and was in the school's 1st eleven football team. From the mid-1960s to early 1970s, he did session work for a company called Avenue Recordings, singing lead and backing vocals (occasionally along with Mick Box on guitar and Paul Newton on bass). These were cover versions of Top 20 hits and were released on EPs and LPs.

In a 1973 interview, Byron said: "I started singing at the age of five. My mother was singing in a jazz band. My whole family was into music. Everybody played an instrument." His first venture into professional music was with an Epping-based semi-pro band called The Stalkers, which also featured Box. Byron and Box then teamed up to form the band Spice (1967–1969), which also featured Newton on bass and Alex Napier on drums. Before settling on the name Spice, other names were considered, including 'The Play'. A handful of acetates exist of unreleased tracks recorded at the time and credited to 'The Play'.

The band gigged extensively locally under the management of Paul Newton's father and they secured a recording deal with United Artists, which issued the band's only single, "What About The Music/In Love"; copies of which now fetch around $50 to $100 on the collectors' market. Newton's fathers wife also convinced David to change his surname to Byron.

Deciding that Spice's sound needed keyboards, they recruited keyboardist/guitarist/singer/songwriter Ken Hensley, who was Newton's bandmate in The Gods. During this time, Byron renamed the band Uriah Heep from the Charles Dickens novel David Copperfield.

== With Uriah Heep (1969–1976) ==
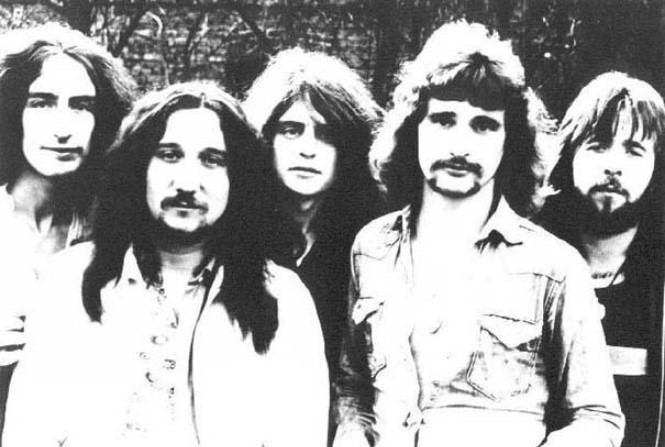
Uriah Heep in 1972 L–R: Ken Hensley, Mick Box, Gary Thain, David Byron and Lee Kerslake

Byron sang on 10 Uriah Heep albums: Very 'Eavy, Very 'Umble, Salisbury, Look at Yourself, Demons and Wizards, The Magician's Birthday, Live, Sweet Freedom, Wonderworld, Return To Fantasy, and High and Mighty. In 1975, Byron released his first solo album, Take No Prisoners, which also featured fellow Heep members Box, Hensley and Lee Kerslake. Byron also gained a reputation for hard drinking, which eventually led to him being sacked from Uriah Heep at the end of a Spanish tour in July 1976.

Hensley said at the time, "David was one of those classic people who couldn't face up to the fact that things were wrong and he looked for solace in a bottle." Ahead of his dismissal, Uriah Heep had secured John Lawton as replacement singer. Their manager at the time, Gerry Bron, said Byron had been released in "the best interest of the group". Bron explained that Byron and the other Uriah Heep members had been in disagreement for some time over fundamental issues of group policy, and that the differences had been finally brought to a head following the band's recent tour of Britain and Europe. "It was felt by the rest of the group that they could no longer reconcile David's attitude with their own," commented Bron.

== Later career (1976–1984) ==
Ad from 1975

Byron recorded three solo albums: Take No Prisoners in 1975, Baby Faced Killer in 1978, and That Was Only Yesterday, which was recorded in 1984, one year before his death. During this period, Byron teamed up with former Colosseum / Humble Pie guitarist Clem Clempson and former Wings drummer Geoff Britton to form Rough Diamond. They recorded one album, Rough Diamond, for Chris Blackwell's Island Records in March 1977. The album sold poorly and Byron quit.

Next, Byron got together with guitarist Robin George to form The Byron Band, which was signed to reggae and funk label, Creole Records and debuted with the single "Every Inch of the Way"/"Routine" (CR 8). This was followed by the single "Never Say Die"/"Tired Eyes", before the release of the 1981 album On the Rocks (CRX 2). However, as with his previous band Rough Diamond, neither critical nor commercial acclaim was forthcoming.

Box and Trevor Bolder invited Byron to re-join Uriah Heep in 1981, after Ken Hensley had left, but Byron refused.

Lost and Found is a double album that included demos and live recordings by the Byron Band, which spanned from 1980 to 1982.

== Death and legacy ==
Byron died of alcohol-related complications, including liver disease and seizures, at his home in Berkshire on 28 February 1985. On BBC Radio's The Friday Rock Show, Tommy Vance played "July Morning" in tribute.

On the Equator tour, around the time of Byron's death, Uriah Heep dedicated "The Wizard" to him. There were also tributes to him and deceased bassist Gary Thain on the 1998 album Sonic Origami. The opening track, "Between Two Worlds", is dedicated to David Byron and Gary Thain, both members of Uriah Heep who died at a young age.

== Discography ==
=== Solo albums ===
- Take No Prisoners – 1975
- Baby Faced Killer – 1978
- That Was Only Yesterday – The Last EP – recorded 1984, released 2008

=== with the Byron Band ===
- On the Rocks – 1981
- Lost and Found – recorded 1980–82, released 2003

=== with Uriah Heep ===
- Very 'Eavy... Very 'Umble – 1970
- Salisbury – 1971
- Look at Yourself – 1971
- Demons and Wizards – 1972
- The Magician's Birthday – 1972
- Uriah Heep Live – 1973
- Sweet Freedom – 1973
- Wonderworld – 1974
- Return to Fantasy – 1975
- High and Mighty – 1976
- Live at Shepperton '74 – recorded 1974, released 1986
- The Lansdowne Tapes – recorded 1969–71, released 1993

=== with Rough Diamond ===
- Rough Diamond – 1977
