= Gerry Bron =

English record producer and band manager

Gerald Lincoln "Gerry" Bron (1 March 1933 – 18 June 2012) was an English record producer and band manager.

== Early life and education ==
Bron was born in Hendon, Middlesex, into a Jewish family, the elder brother of actress Eleanor Bron. Their father, Sydney, shortened the family's surname to "Bron" from "Bronstein" when founding Bron's Orchestral Service, which was purported to be the largest sheet music supplier in the UK. After spending two years at Trinity College of Music, Bron joined Bron's Orchestral Service in 1950.

== Career ==
=== Bron's Orchestral Service ===
Bron's Orchestral Service expanded into music publishing, and began working with American publishers like Aaron Schroeder who were seeking representation in the UK. One of the first acts that Bron was responsible for was Gene Pitney. This business relationship led to Bron and Pitney discussing making records together and Bron began producing all the demos for the publishing company.

Bron also began managing acts, including Gene Pitney, The Bonzo Dog Doo-Dah Band, Marianne Faithfull, Manfred Mann, Colosseum, Osibisa, and Uriah Heep. In 1967-68 he produced Manfred Mann's hit singles "Ha! Ha! Said the Clown", "My Name is Jack" and "Fox On The Run". These were followed by albums produced for Colosseum and Uriah Heep.

=== Bronze Records ===
In 1971, after having produced Uriah Heep's album ...Very 'Eavy ...Very 'Umble at Lansdowne Studios in London, Bron founded Bronze Records, an independent record label which could serve as the band's label for future releases. The label would become home to many of the bands Bron was managing and more, including Manfred Mann's Earth Band, Osibisa, Paladin, The Real Kids, Sally Oldfield, Motörhead, The Damned, Girlschool, Bronz and Hawkwind.

In the mid-1970s, Bron's record label issued an album by Gene Pitney, along with a single, "Blue Angel", which became a hit in the UK and Australia.

=== Roundhouse Recording Studios ===
In 1975, Bron founded a recording studio next door to the famed Roundhouse performance venue in London, appropriately naming it Roundhouse Recording Studios.

== Selected album production credits ==
- Motörhead
- Uriah Heep
  - ...Very 'Eavy ...Very 'Umble
  - Salisbury
  - Look at Yourself
  - Demons & Wizards
  - The Magician's Birthday
  - Sweet Freedom
  - Wonderworld
  - Return to Fantasy
  - Firefly
  - Innocent Victim
  - Fallen Angel
  - Conquest

- Bonzo Dog Doo-Dah Band
  - Gorilla
  - The Doughnut In Granny's Greenhouse

- Kim Mitchell
  - Akimbo Alogo

== Selected single production credits ==
- Manfred Mann
  - "Ha! Ha! Said the Clown"
  - "My Name is Jack"
  - "Fox On The Run"
  - "Ragamuffin Man"
- Gene Pitney
  - "Something's Gotten Hold of My Heart"
- Juicy Lucy
  - "Who Do You Love?"
- Richard Barnes
  - "Take To The Mountains"
  - "Go North"
- Kim Mitchell 12 inch remix and radio single for "Go For Soda" from the album Akimbo Alogo

== See also ==
- Bronze Records
