= Bronze Records =

English record label

- Founded: 1971–1986
- Founder: Gerry Bron
- Status: Defunct
- Distributors: Island Records (1971–1977); EMI (1977–1980); Polydor (1980–1986)
- Genre: Rock
- Country of origin: United Kingdom
- Location: London, England

Bronze Records was an independent English record label founded in 1971 by record producer Gerry Bron on Oxford Street in London, eventually relocating to Chalk Farm.

== History ==
Bron had been producing Uriah Heep for Vertigo Records, and he set up the new label for future Uriah Heep releases, along with Juicy Lucy, Richard Barnes, Eastern Alliance and Colosseum. Other subsequent acts included Gene Pitney, Osibisa, Paladin, Goldie, Manfred Mann's Earth Band (another Vertigo refugee), the Real Kids, Roxy Music's Andy Mackay, Sally Oldfield, Kim Mitchell, Motörhead, Angel Witch, the Damned, Girlschool, Bronz and Hawkwind.

Iain Clark, then drummer of Uriah Heep, won a £25 prize for coming up with the name of the record company.

Original manufacturing and distribution was through Island Records, moving to EMI in 1977 and then to Polydor Records in 1980. The label folded in financial difficulty in 1986, with the catalogue being sold to Ray Richards' Legacy Records. It subsequently passed to Castle Communications, and later Sanctuary Records, now controlled by the new incarnation of BMG.

== See also ==
- Lists of record labels
