= List of Uriah Heep members =

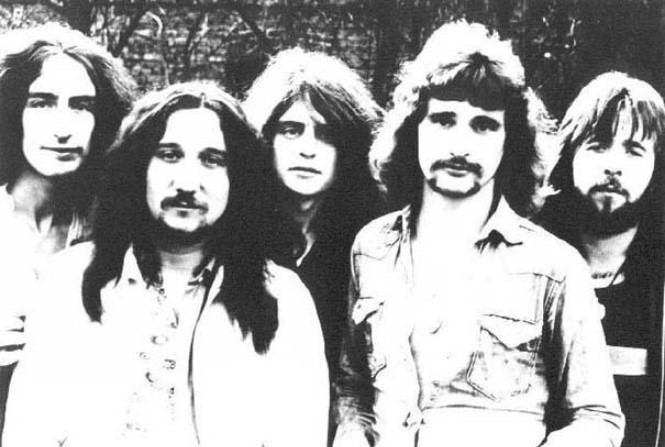
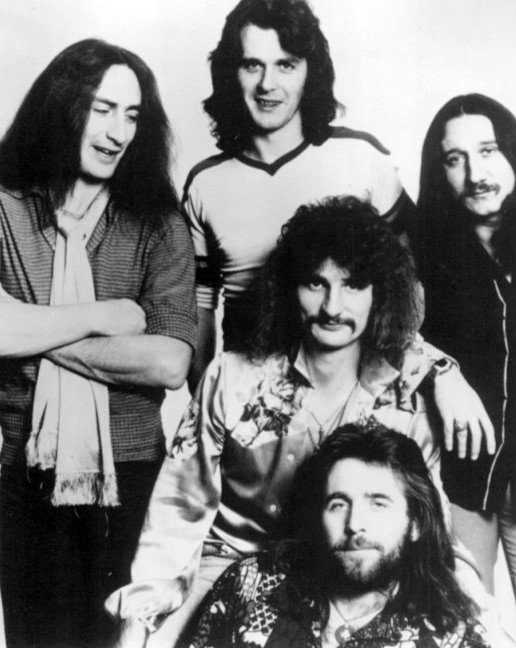
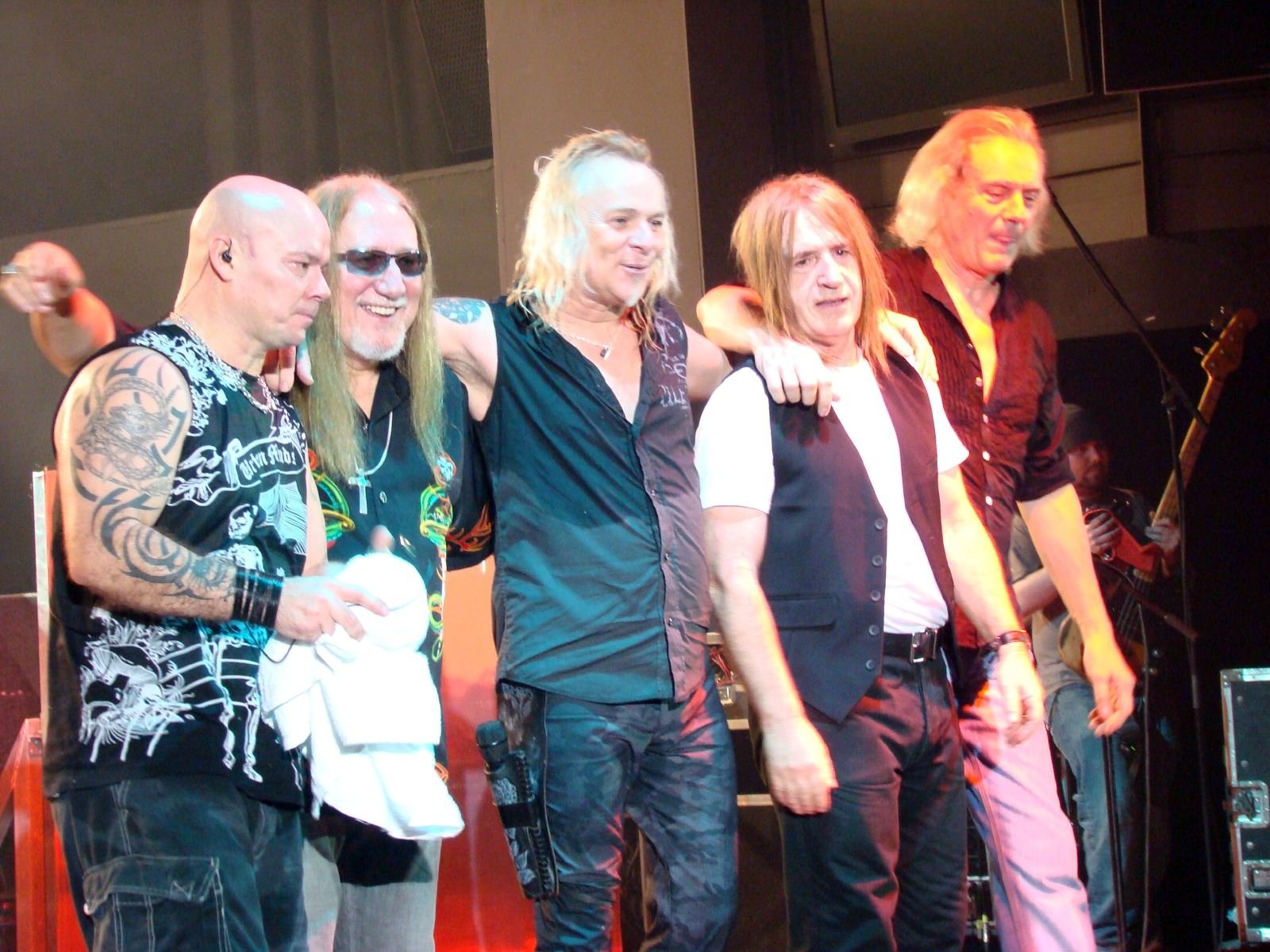
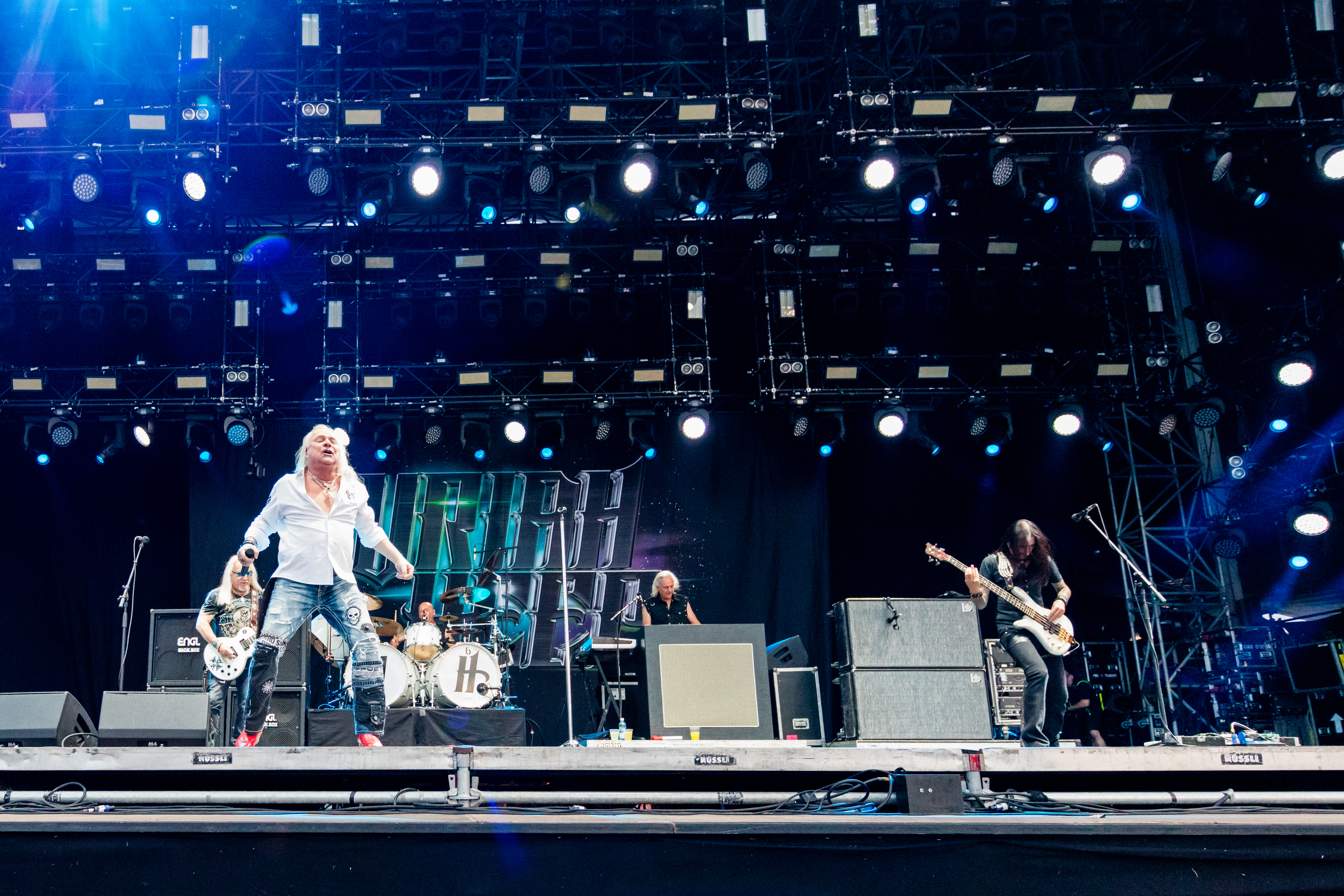
Four lineups of Uriah Heep in 1972, 1977, 2008 and 2018.

Uriah Heep are an English rock band from London. Formed in late 1969, the group originally featured vocalist David Byron, guitarist Mick Box, keyboardist, guitarist and vocalist Ken Hensley, bassist Paul Newton, and drummer Alex Napier. The current line-up consists of Box, alongside keyboardist Phil Lanzon and vocalist Bernie Shaw (both since 1986), Russell Gilbrook (since 2007) and bassist Dave Rimmer (since 2013).

== History ==
Nigel Olsson replaced Napier in early 1970, with both drummers contributing to the band's debut album ...Very 'Eavy ...Very 'Umble. Olsson was replaced by Keith Baker and then Iain Clark, before Lee Kerslake joined as the group's first long-term drummer in late 1971, when Mark Clarke also replaced Newton. Clarke was later replaced by Gary Thain, who first appeared on 1972's Demons and Wizards. Thain was fired from the band in early 1975 due to an "increasing drug problem", which eventually led to his death from a heroin overdose on 8 December that year; he was replaced by John Wetton.

Byron was fired from Uriah Heep in 1976 due to his growing alcohol abuse, which led to his death from liver failure in 1985. He was replaced by John Lawton, as bassist Trevor Bolder also joined during the same period, following Wetton's departure. After tensions arose between Lawton and Hensley, the vocalist left and was replaced by John Sloman, while Kerslake was replaced by Chris Slade shortly after his arrival. Due to disagreements with the addition of Sloman and the band's musical direction, Hensley left the band in 1980 and was briefly replaced by Gregg Dechert. By April 1981, only Box remained in Uriah Heep, rebuilding the band with the addition of bassist Bob Daisley, returning drummer Kerslake (both recently departed from Ozzy Osbourne's band), keyboardist John Sinclair (later of Ozzy Osbourne's band with Daisley) and new vocalist Peter Goalby (recently of Trapeze).

After the release of Abominog and Head First, Bolder returned to Uriah Heep in 1983. Goalby and Sinclair left in 1986, with Andy Scott's Sweet keyboardist Phil Lanzon and, briefly, Steff Fontaine taking over on vocals before Bernie Shaw was brought in a few months later. Uriah Heep's lineup remained stable until January 2007, when Kerslake was forced to leave the band due to "ongoing health problems". He was replaced by Russell Gilbrook in March. On 21 May 2013, Bolder died of cancer, having taken a touring hiatus due to an operation earlier that year with John Jowitt covering. He was later replaced by Dave Rimmer.

== Members ==
=== Current members ===
Image	Name	Years active	Instruments	Release contributions
	Mick Box	1969–present	guitar; backing vocals	all Uriah Heep releases
	Phil Lanzon	1986–present	keyboards; backing and occasional lead vocals	all Uriah Heep releases from Live in Moscow (1988) onwards, except Live on the King Biscuit Flower Hour (1997)
	Bernie Shaw	1986–present	lead vocals	all Uriah Heep releases from Live in Moscow (1988) onwards, except Live on the King Biscuit Flower Hour (1997)
	Russell Gilbrook	2007–present	drums; percussion; backing vocals	all Uriah Heep releases from Wake the Sleeper (2008) onwards
	Dave Rimmer	2013–present	bass; backing vocals	all Uriah Heep releases from Outsider (2014) onwards

=== Former members ===
Image	Name	Years active	Instruments	Release contributions
	Ken Hensley	1969–1980 (plus live guest in 2001 and 2015) (died 2020)	keyboards; guitar; backing and lead vocals	all Uriah Heep releases from ...Very 'Eavy ...Very 'Umble (1970) to Conquest (1980); Live in Europe 1979 (1986); Live at Shepperton '74 (1986); Live on the King Biscuit Flower Hour (1997); The Magician's Birthday Party (2002)
	David Byron	1969–1976 (died 1985)	lead and backing vocals	all Uriah Heep releases from ...Very 'Eavy ...Very 'Umble (1970) to High and Mighty (1976); Live at Shepperton '74 (1986); Live on the King Biscuit Flower Hour (1997)
	Paul Newton	1969–1971 (plus live guest in 2019)	bass; backing vocals	...Very 'Eavy ...Very 'Umble (1970); Salisbury (1971); Look at Yourself (1971)
	Alex Napier	1969–1970 (died 2023)	drums	...Very 'Eavy ...Very 'Umble (1970) all but two tracks
	Nigel Olsson	1970	drums; percussion	...Very 'Eavy ...Very 'Umble (1970) two tracks
	Keith Baker	1970	drums	...Very 'Eavy ...Very 'Umble (1970) one track on US version; Salisbury (1971)
	Iain Clark	1970–1971	drums	Look at Yourself (1971)
	Lee Kerslake	1971–1979; 1981–2007 (plus live guest in 2015 and 2018) (died 2020)	drums; percussion; backing vocals	all Uriah Heep releases from Demons and Wizards (1972) to Fallen Angel (1978), and from Abominog (1982) to Magic Night (2004)
	Mark Clarke	1971–1972	bass; backing and lead vocals	Demons and Wizards (1972), 2 tracks only: "The Wizard" and "Why"
	Gary Thain	1972–1975 (died 1975)	bass; occasional backing vocals	all Uriah Heep releases from Demons and Wizards (1972) to Wonderworld (1974); Live at Shepperton '74 (1986); Live on the King Biscuit Flower Hour (1997)
	John Wetton	1975–1976 (died 2017)	bass; backing and occasional lead vocals; piano; mellotron	Return to Fantasy (1975); High and Mighty (1976)
	Trevor Bolder	1976–1981; 1983–2013 (until his death)	bass; backing and occasional lead vocals	Firefly (1977); Innocent Victim (1977); Fallen Angel (1978); Conquest (1980); Equator (1985); Live in Europe 1979 (1986); all Uriah Heep releases from Live in Moscow (1988) to Spellbinder (1996), and from Sonic Origami (1998) to Official Bootleg Volume Six: Live at the Rock of Ages Festival Germany 2008 (2013)
	John Lawton	1976–1979 (plus live substitute in 1995 and 2013; live guest in 2001 and 2019) (died 2021)	lead and backing vocals; occasional acoustic guitar	Firefly (1977); Innocent Victim (1977); Fallen Angel (1978); Live in Europe 1979 (1986); The Magician's Birthday Party (2002)
	Chris Slade	1979–1981	drums; percussion	Conquest (1980)
	John Sloman	1979–1981	lead vocals; piano; percussion; keyboards	Conquest (1980)
	Gregg Dechert	1980–1981	keyboards; backing vocals	"Love Stealer" (1980); "Think It Over" (1981)
	John Sinclair	1981–1985	keyboards; backing vocals	Abominog (1982); Head First (1983); Equator (1985)
	Peter Goalby	1981–1985	lead vocals; occasional acoustic guitar	Abominog (1982); Head First (1983); Equator (1985)
	Bob Daisley	1981–1983	bass; backing vocals	Abominog (1982); Head First (1983)
	Steff Fontaine	1986 (died 2026)	lead vocals	none

=== Substitute musicians ===
Image	Name	Years active	Instruments	Release contributions
	John Jowitt	2013	bass	Jowitt toured with the band in early 2013, while Bolder underwent an undisclosed operation.
	Stefan Berggren	2016	vocals	Berggren substituted for Shaw on two occasions in 2016, due to family commitments.
	Don Airey	2020	keyboards	Deep Purple keyboardist Don Airey stood in for Lanzon at two shows in January 2020 after the keyboardist's son died.
	Adam Wakeman	2024	keyboards; backing vocals	Wakeman filled in for Lanzon during the band's spring 2024 US tour with Saxon, due to family commitments.
	Sam Wood	2026–present	guitar	Wood filled in during some European shows in early 2026, as Box was sidelined from the group due to health issues.

=== Session musicians ===
Image	Name	Years active	Instruments	Release contributions
	Colin Wood	1969	keyboards	...Very 'Eavy ...Very 'Umble (1970)
	John Fiddy	1970	brass and woodwind arrangement	Salisbury (1971)
	Manfred Mann	1971	moog synthesizer	Look at Yourself (1971)
	Ted Osei	1971 (died 2025)	percussion	Look at Yourself (1971)
	Mac Tontoh	1971 (died 2010)	percussion	Look at Yourself (1971)
	Loughty Amao	1971 (died 1988)	percussion	Look at Yourself (1971)
	Brian Cole	1972	pedal steel guitar	The Magician's Birthday (1972)
	Jose Gabriel	1974	synthesizers	Wonderworld (1974)
	Michael Gibbs	1974	orchestral arrangements	Wonderworld (1974)
	Chris Mercer	1978	saxophone	Fallen Angel (1978)
	Gerry Bron	1979 (died 2012)	timpani	Conquest (1980)
	Frank Ricotti	1983; 1988–1989	percussion	Head First (1983); Raging Silence (1989)
	Maria Zackojiva	1988–1989	Russian spoken words	Raging Silence (1989)
	Brett Morgan	1988–1989; 1990	drums	Raging Silence (1989); Different World (1991)
	Danny Wood	1990	accordion	Different World (1991)
	Benny Marshall	1990	harmonica	Different World (1991)
	Steve Piggott	1990	keyboard programming	Different World (1991)
	Children of Queen Elizabeth's Grammar School, Alford (as "All God's Children choir")	1990	choir	Different World (1991)
	Andrew Willoughby	1990	choir conductor	Different World (1991)
	Piet Sielck	1994–1995	additional keyboards	Sea of Light (1995)
	Pete Beckett	1994–1995	additional backing vocals; string arrangements	Sea of Light (1995)
	Rolf Köhler	1994–1995 (died 2007)	additional backing vocals	Sea of Light (1995)

== Lineups ==
Dates are taken from the band's official website.

Period	Members	Studio albums
Autumn 1969 – January 1970	Mick Box – guitar, backing vocals; Ken Hensley – keyboards, guitar, backing and lead vocals; David Byron – lead vocals; Paul Newton – bass, backing vocals; Alex Napier – drums	...Very 'Eavy ...Very 'Umble (1970) (except "Lucy Blues" and "Dreammare")
January – February 1970	Mick Box – guitar, backing vocals; Ken Hensley – keyboards, guitar, backing and lead vocals; David Byron – lead vocals; Paul Newton – bass, backing vocals; Nigel Olsson – drums	...Very 'Eavy ...Very 'Umble (1970) ("Lucy Blues" and "Dreammare")
February – October 1970	Mick Box – guitar, backing vocals; Ken Hensley – keyboards, guitar, backing and lead vocals; David Byron – lead vocals; Paul Newton – bass, backing vocals; Keith Baker – drums	Salisbury (1971)
October 1970 – November 1971	Mick Box – guitar, backing vocals; Ken Hensley – keyboards, guitar, backing and lead vocals; David Byron – lead vocals; Paul Newton – bass, backing vocals; Iain Clarke – drums	Look at Yourself (1971)
November 1971 – February 1972	Mick Box – guitar, backing vocals; Ken Hensley – keyboards, guitar, backing and lead vocals; David Byron – lead vocals; Mark Clarke – bass, backing and lead vocals; Lee Kerslake – drums, backing vocals	Demons and Wizards (1972) ("The Wizard")
February 1972 – February 1975	Mick Box – guitar, backing vocals; Ken Hensley – keyboards, guitar, backing and lead vocals; David Byron – lead vocals; Lee Kerslake – drums, backing vocals; Gary Thain – bass, backing vocals	Demons and Wizards (1972) (remaining tracks); The Magician's Birthday (1972); Sweet Freedom (1973); Wonderworld (1974)
March 1975 – August 1976	Mick Box – guitar, backing vocals; Ken Hensley – keyboards, guitar, backing and lead vocals; David Byron – lead vocals; Lee Kerslake – drums, backing vocals; John Wetton – bass, backing and lead vocals	Return to Fantasy (1975); High and Mighty (1976)
September 1976 – October 1979	Mick Box – guitar, backing vocals; Ken Hensley – keyboards, guitar, backing and lead vocals; Lee Kerslake – drums, backing vocals; Trevor Bolder – bass, backing vocals; John Lawton – lead vocals	Firefly (1977); Innocent Victim (1977); Fallen Angel (1978)
November 1979 – May 1980	Mick Box – guitar, backing vocals; Ken Hensley – keyboards, guitar, backing and lead vocals; Trevor Bolder – bass, backing vocals; John Sloman – lead vocals, piano, keyboards; Chris Slade – drums	Conquest (1980)
July 1980 – April 1981	Mick Box – guitar, backing vocals; Trevor Bolder – bass, backing vocals; John Sloman – lead vocals, piano, keyboards; Chris Slade – drums; Gregg Dechert – keyboards, backing vocals	"Love Stealer" (1980); "Think It Over" (1981)
April 1981 – April 1983	Mick Box – guitar, backing vocals; Lee Kerslake – drums, backing vocals; John Sinclair – keyboards, backing vocals; Bob Daisley – bass, backing vocals; Peter Goalby – lead vocals	Abominog (1982); Head First (1983)
May 1983 – November 1985	Mick Box – guitar, backing vocals; Lee Kerslake – drums, backing vocals; John Sinclair – keyboards, backing vocals; Peter Goalby – lead vocals; Trevor Bolder – bass, backing vocals	Equator (1985)
July – September 1986	Mick Box – guitar, backing vocals; Lee Kerslake – drums, backing vocals; Trevor Bolder – bass, backing vocals; Phil Lanzon – keyboards, backing vocals; Steff Fontaine – lead vocals	none
September 1986 – January 2007	Mick Box – guitar, backing vocals; Lee Kerslake – drums, backing vocals; Trevor Bolder – bass, backing vocals; Phil Lanzon – keyboards, backing vocals; Bernie Shaw – lead vocals	Raging Silence (1989); Different World (1991); Sea of Light (1995); Sonic Origami (1998)
March 2007 – May 2013	Mick Box – guitar, backing vocals; Trevor Bolder – bass, backing vocals; Phil Lanzon – keyboards, backing vocals; Bernie Shaw – lead vocals; Russell Gilbrook – drums, backing vocals	Wake the Sleeper (2008); Into the Wild (2011)
May 2013 – present	Mick Box – guitar, backing vocals; Phil Lanzon – keyboards, backing vocals; Bernie Shaw – lead vocals; Russell Gilbrook – drums, backing vocals; Dave Rimmer – bass, backing vocals	Outsider (2014); Living the Dream (2018); Chaos & Colour (2023)
