= Celebration – Forty Years of Rock =

Studio album by Uriah Heep
- Released: 26 October 2009
- Recorded: 2009
- Studio: Liscombe Park Studios, Buckinghamshire, UK
- Genre: Hard rock, progressive rock, heavy metal
- Length: 62:14
- Label: earMUSIC/Edel
- Producer: Mike Paxman

Uriah Heep chronology
Wake the Sleeper (2008)	Celebration – Forty Years of Rock (2009)	Into the Wild (2011)

Professional ratings
Review scores
Source	Rating
AllMusic	3.5/5 stars

Celebration – Forty Years of Rock is an album by British rock band Uriah Heep. It mainly features rerecorded classics – which, said bassist Trevor Bolder, "chose themselves, really. The likes of 'Sunrise', 'Gypsy' and 'Look at Yourself' are songs we still play today. We just went in and redid them. [Drummer] Russell [Gilbrook] is a bit of an animal, so they sound livelier than ever." Two tracks were written specifically for this release: 'Only Human' ("A bit of an '80s vibe," said Bolder) and 'Corridors of Madness'. A double special edition, in digipak format, features a live DVD recorded at the Sweden Rock Festival. A collector's edition adds a vinyl single; its two songs also recorded at the Sweden Rock Festival, and not included on the DVD.

Celebration was released in most European territories on 6 October 2009; on 26 October 2009 in the UK; and approximately one month later in the United States.

In 2015, keyboardist Phil Lanzon released a music video for "Corridors of Madness", featuring the footage filmed on tour in Israel and the United States.

== Track listings ==
All music is composed by Ken Hensley, except where noted.

No.	Title	Writer(s)	Length
1.	"Only Human" (New song)	Mick Box, Phil Lanzon	3:19
2.	"Bird of Prey"	Box, David Byron, Hensley, Paul Newton	3:58
3.	"Sunrise"		4:20
4.	"Stealin'"		4:39
5.	"Corridors of Madness" (New song)	Box, Lanzon	5:20
6.	"Between Two Worlds"	Box, Lanzon	6:08
7.	"The Wizard"	Mark Clarke, Hensley	3:13
8.	"Free Me"		3:26
9.	"Free 'n' Easy"	Box, John Lawton	2:33
10.	"Gypsy"	Box, Byron	4:33
11.	"Look at Yourself"		3:44
12.	"July Morning"	Byron, Hensley	8:46
13.	"Easy Livin'"		2:54
14.	"Lady in Black"		5:31

Digipak Edition bonus DVD - Live at Sweden Rock Festival 2009
No.	Title	Writer(s)	Length
1.	"Sunrise"
2.	"Stealin'"
3.	"Gypsy"	Box, Byron
4.	"Look at Yourself"
5.	"July Morning"	Byron, Hensley
6.	"Easy Livin'"
7.	"Lady in Black"

Limited Edition bonus 7" - Live at Sweden Rock Festival 2009
No.	Title	Writer(s)	Length
1.	"Ghost of the Ocean"	Box, Lanzon
2.	"Angels Walk with You"	Trevor Bolder

== Personnel ==
Uriah Heep

- Mick Box – guitar, backing vocals
- Trevor Bolder – bass guitar, backing vocals
- Phil Lanzon – keyboards, backing vocals
- Bernie Shaw – lead vocals
- Russell Gilbrook – drums, backing vocals

Production

- Mike Paxman – producer
- Steve Rispin – engineer
- Mark 'Tufty' Evans – mixing at Wispington Studios, Cookham, Berkshire, UK
