= Totally Driven =

Greatest hits album by Uriah Heep
- Released: 2001 (originally); 12 November 2015
- Recorded: 2000–2001
- Genres: Progressive rock, hard rock, heavy metal
- Length: 123:27
- Label: Uriah Heep via Cherry Red Records
- Producer: Pip Williams

Uriah Heep compilation chronology
Playlist: The Very Best of Uriah Heep (2015)	Totally Driven (2001)	Access All Areas (2015)

Totally Driven is the greatest hits album by British hard-rock band Uriah Heep, released on 12 November 2015 on their own label, Uriah Heep Records. The album contains re-recorded versions of 27 of their best known songs, recorded with the long-standing 1986-2007 lineup.

The album was originally released in 2001 with a different track order as Remasters: The Official Anthology, but it went out of print quite quickly and was forgotten about. It was reissued in 2004 as Uriah Heep's Gold: Looking Back 1970-2001 without the band's knowledge by a European budget label.

According to guitarist Mick Box, the songs were recorded in preparation for the Acoustically Driven and Electrically Driven concerts.

== Track listing ==
Disc one
No.	Title	Length
1.	"Gypsy"	3:54
2.	"Traveller in Time"	2:50
3.	"Bird of Prey"	4:43
4.	"Sunrise"	4:06
5.	"Rain"	4:16
6.	"Come Away Melinda"	3:32
7.	"Return to Fantasy"	4:37
8.	"Look at Yourself"	3:22
9.	"Come Back to Me"	4:04
10.	"The Easy Road"	2:39
11.	"Sweet Freedom"	6:13
12.	"Why Did You Go?"	3:23
13.	"July Morning"	8:51
14.	"Easy Livin'"	2:40

Disc two
No.	Title	Length
1.	"Between Two Worlds"	5:25
2.	"Only the Young"	4:33
3.	"Different World"	4:21
4.	"Love in Silence"	6:23
5.	"Blind Eye"	3:16
6.	"Wonderworld"	4:20
7.	"Stealin'"	4:42
8.	"Time of Revelation"	3:57
9.	"Cross That Line"	5:23
10.	"More Fool You"	3:11
11.	"Universal Wheels"	4:52
12.	"The Golden Palace"	7:57
13.	"Lady in Black"	5:41

== Personnel ==
Uriah Heep

- Bernie Shaw – lead vocals
- Mick Box – guitar, backing vocals
- Phil Lanzon – keyboards, backing vocals, string arrangements
- Trevor Bolder – bass, backing vocals
- Lee Kerslake – drums, backing vocals

Additional musicians

- Melvin Duffy – pedal steel, slide guitar
- Stefan Hannigan – uilleann pipes, percussion
- Kim Chandler – flute, backing vocals
- Sarah Chi Liew, Liz Chi Yen Liew – violins
- Pauline Kirke – cello
- Saskia Tomkins – viola
- Billie Godfrey, Emma Robbins – backing vocals

Production

- Pip Williams – acoustic guitar, string arrangements and producer
- Mike Pietrini – remastering
