= Gypsy (Uriah Heep song) =

Single by Uriah Heep

from the album ...Very 'Eavy ...Very 'Umble
- B-side: "Real Turned On" (US) "Bird of Prey" (EU)
- Released: July 1970 (US); December 1970 (EU)
- Genre: Heavy metal; blues rock; progressive rock
- Length: 6:37
- Label: Bronze; Mercury
- Songwriters: Mick Box, David Byron
- Producer: Gerry Bron

Uriah Heep singles chronology
"Gypsy" (1970)	"Lady in Black" (1971)

"Gypsy" is the debut single by British progressive rock/hard rock band Uriah Heep. It is the opening track on their first album, …Very 'Eavy …Very 'Umble, released in 1970. "Gypsy" was written by Mick Box and David Byron. The album version of "Gypsy" lasts more than six and half minutes, while the single version lasts less than three minutes. The song is structured with an intro, outro and three verses with no chorus. It is a staple of the band's live performances.

== Reception ==
Martin Popoff called the song "[...] a sinner's march par excellence, one of the most regal marriages of crunching organ and power chords ever forged in fire [...]". Donald A. Guarisco of AllMusic said: "[...] the album's finest achievement is "Gypsy": this heavy metal gem nails the blend of swirling organ riffs, power chords, and leather-lunged vocal harmonies that would define the group's classic tunes [...]" Billboard noted the song as "outstanding". Ultimate Classic Rock commented: "The bombastic qualities of heavy metal’s revolutionary blueprint were all in evidence on the album’s dramatic opener, “Gypsy” [...]"

== Release ==
The song was included on the band's first compilation album, The Best of Uriah Heep (1974) and most other compilations including Totally Driven (2001), The Ultimate Collection (2003), Easy Livin': Singles A's & B's (2006), Loud, Proud & Heavy (2007), and Celebration (2009). It was also on two live albums, 1973's Uriah Heep Live and the 2011's Live in Armenia.

== Cover versions ==
The song was covered by American noise rock band godheadSilo in 1996, appearing on their Booby Trap 7-inch EP.

In 2023 the British heavy metal band Saxon covered the song for their covers album More Inspirations.

== Personnel ==
- Mick Box – lead and acoustic guitars
- David Byron – lead vocals
- Ken Hensley – piano, organ
- Paul Newton – bass guitar
- Alex Napier – drums

== Charts ==
Chart (1971)	Peak position
West Germany (GfK)	28
