= Chaos & Colour =

Studio album by Uriah Heep
- Released: 27 January 2023
- Recorded: 2022
- Studio: Chapel Studios, UK
- Genre: Hard rock
- Length: 59:00
- Label: Silver Lining Music Ltd.
- Producer: Jay Ruston

Uriah Heep chronology
Living the Dream (2018)	Chaos & Colour (2023)

Professional ratings
Review scores
Source	Rating
Classic Rock	4/5 stars

Chaos & Colour is the 25th studio album by English rock band Uriah Heep, released in January 2023 by Silver Lining Music. It was produced by Jay Ruston.

== Track listing ==
No.	Title	Writer(s)	Length
1.	"Save Me Tonight"	Dave Rimmer, Jeff Scott Soto	3:30
2.	"Silver Sunlight"	Mick Box, Phil Lanzon	4:31
3.	"Hail the Sunrise"	Russell Gilbrook, Simon J. Pinto	4:23
4.	"Age of Changes"	Box, Lanzon	5:50
5.	"Hurricane"	Gilbrook, Pinto	4:50
6.	"One Nation, One Sun"	Box, Lanzon	7:36
7.	"Golden Light"	Box, Lanzon	5:09
8.	"You'll Never Be Alone"	Gilbrook, Pinto	7:58
9.	"Fly Like an Eagle"	Gilbrook, Pinto	3:49
10.	"Freedom to Be Free"	Box, Lanzon	8:11
Total length:			59:00

Deluxe edition bonus tracks
No.	Title	Writer(s)	Length
11.	"Closer to Your Dreams"	Box, Lanzon	3:37

== Personnel ==
Uriah Heep

- Mick Box – guitar, backing vocals
- Phil Lanzon – keyboards, backing vocals
- Bernie Shaw – lead vocals
- Russell Gilbrook – drums, percussion
- Dave Rimmer – bass guitar, backing vocals

Production

- Jay Ruston – producer, engineer

== Charts ==
Chart (2023)	Peak position
Austrian Albums (Ö3 Austria)	10
Belgian Albums (Ultratop Flanders)	94
Belgian Albums (Ultratop Wallonia)	78
Finnish Albums (Suomen virallinen lista)	16
French Albums (SNEP)	190
German Albums (Offizielle Top 100)	4
Norwegian Albums (VG-lista)	40
Scottish Albums (OCC)	4
Spanish Albums (Promusicae)	98
Swedish Albums (Sverigetopplistan)	60
Swiss Albums (Schweizer Hitparade)	5
UK Albums (OCC)	73
UK Independent Albums (OCC)	1
UK Rock & Metal Albums (OCC)	1
US Top Album Sales (Billboard)	69
