= Living the Dream (Uriah Heep album) =

Studio album by Uriah Heep
- Released: 14 September 2018
- Studios: Chapel Studios, UK
- Genres: Hard rock, progressive rock, heavy metal
- Length: 52:24
- Label: Frontiers
- Producer: Jay Ruston

Uriah Heep chronology
Outsider (2014)	Living the Dream (2018)	Chaos & Colour (2023)

Professional ratings
Review scores
Source	Rating
Classic Rock	4/5 stars

Living the Dream is the 24th studio album by British rock band Uriah Heep, released in September 2018 by Frontiers Records. It was produced by Jay Ruston. Production on the record lasted for 19 days, with the band recording everything "live".

Living the Dream was made possible via a crowdfunding campaign on PledgeMusic.

== Critical reception ==
The album received positive reviews from critics. Dom Lawson of Classic Rock stated that "Living the Dream is as strong as anything the band have produced in two, maybe three decades." Martin Popoff of Goldmine said the album "finds the band putting aside any of their recent technological or stylistic nods to modernity in exercise of a defiance that leaves only pure and timeless Heep jubilance".

== Track listing ==
All tracks are written by Mick Box and Phil Lanzon, except "Grazed by Heaven" by Dave Rimmer and Jeff Scott Soto, "Goodbye to Innocence" by Box, Lanzon and Bernie Shaw

No.	Title	Length
1.	"Grazed by Heaven"	4:31
2.	"Living the Dream"	5:34
3.	"Take Away My Soul"	6:13
4.	"Knocking at My Door"	4:58
5.	"Rocks in the Road"	8:18
6.	"Waters Flowin'"	4:27
7.	"It's All Been Said"	6:01
8.	"Goodbye to Innocence"	3:33
9.	"Falling Under Your Spell"	3:24
10.	"Dreams of Yesteryear"	5:25
Total length:		52:24

"Waters Flowin'" and "Rocks in the Road" are transposed on the vinyl release - the latter track ends the A-side and the former begins the B-side.

Deluxe Edition Bonus tracks
No.	Title	Length
11.	"Take Away My Soul" (Alternate version)	4:36
12.	"Making the Dream (The Documentary)" (DVD-1)

Deluxe Edition Music Videos
No.	Title	Length
13.	"Grazed by Heaven" (DVD-2)
14.	"Take Away My Soul" (DVD-3)

== Personnel ==
Uriah Heep

- Mick Box – guitar, backing vocals
- Phil Lanzon – keyboards, backing vocals
- Bernie Shaw – lead vocals
- Russell Gilbrook – drums, percussion
- Dave Rimmer – bass guitar, backing vocals

Production

- Jay Ruston – producer, engineer

== Charts ==
Chart (2018)	Peak position
Austrian Albums (Ö3 Austria)	18
Belgian Albums (Ultratop Flanders)	91
Belgian Albums (Ultratop Wallonia)	58
Dutch Albums (Album Top 100)	109
Finnish Albums (Suomen virallinen lista)	28
German Albums (Offizielle Top 100)	10
Japanese Albums (Oricon)	181
Norwegian Albums (VG-lista)	28
Scottish Albums (Official Charts)	19
Swiss Albums (Schweizer Hitparade)	5
UK Albums (Official Charts)	57
UK Independent Albums (Official Charts)	10
UK Progressive Albums (Official Charts)	4
UK Rock & Metal Albums (Official Charts)	3
US Independent Albums (Billboard)	37
