= Outsider (Uriah Heep album) =

Studio album by Uriah Heep
- Released: June 2014
- Recorded: January – February 2014
- Studios: Liscombe Park Studio, Leighton Buzzard, Buckinghamshire
- Genres: Hard rock, progressive rock, heavy metal
- Length: 49:00
- Labels: Frontiers; Avalon (Japan)
- Producer: Mike Paxman

Uriah Heep chronology
Into the Wild (2011)	Outsider (2014)	Living the Dream (2018)

Professional ratings
Review scores
Source	Rating
Record Collector	3/5 stars
Rock Hard	7.5/10
Ultimate Guitar	8/10

Outsider is the 23rd studio album by Uriah Heep, released in Europe in June 2014 by Frontiers Records. It was produced by Mike Paxman and it is the first album with bassist Dave Rimmer. Cover art was created by Igor Morski.

== Track listing ==
All tracks are written by Mick Box and Phil Lanzon, except "The Outsider" by Box, Lanzon and P.C. Lanzon.

No.	Title	Length
1.	"Speed of Sound"	4:56
2.	"One Minute"	4:54
3.	"The Law"	5:24
4.	"The Outsider"	3:22
5.	"Rock the Foundation"	4:07
6.	"Is Anybody Gonna Help Me?"	5:07
7.	"Looking at You"	3:36
8.	"Can't Take That Away"	4:55
9.	"Jessie"	3:59
10.	"Kiss the Rainbow"	5:12
11.	"Say Goodbye"	3:34

Japanese edition bonus tracks
No.	Title	Length
12.	"One Minute (60 Seconds)"
13.	"Between Two Worlds" (live)

== Personnel ==
Uriah Heep

- Mick Box – guitar, backing vocals
- Phil Lanzon – keyboards, backing vocals
- Bernie Shaw – lead vocals
- Russell Gilbrook – drums, backing vocals
- Dave Rimmer – bass guitar, backing vocals

Production

- Mike Paxman – producer
- Steve Rispin, Peter Waterman – engineers
- Mark "Tufty" Evans – mixing at Croosh Alley Studios
- Bob Fairshield – mastering

== Charts ==
Chart (2014)	Peak position
Austrian Albums (Ö3 Austria)	56
Belgian Albums (Ultratop Flanders)	150
Belgian Albums (Ultratop Wallonia)	129
Dutch Albums (Album Top 100)	74
Finnish Albums (Suomen virallinen lista)	28
German Albums (Offizielle Top 100)	32
ERROR in "Oricon": Invalid position: 237. Expected number 1–200 or dash (–).
Swiss Albums (Schweizer Hitparade)	17
UK Independent Albums (Official Charts)	18
UK Rock & Metal Albums (Official Charts)	9
