= Stratus (English band) =

English melodic hard rock band (1983–1985)

- Origin: London, England
- Genres: Hard rock; heavy metal
- Years active: 1983–1985
- Label: Steel Trax
- Past members: Bernie Shaw; Tino Troy; Chris Troy; Alan Nelson; Clive Burr

Stratus (originally "Clive Burr's Escape", then briefly known as "Tygon" and "Stratas"), was a short-lived English melodic hard rock supergroup. It was formed by ex-Iron Maiden drummer Clive Burr, the Troy brothers from then-inactive Praying Mantis; plus ex-Grand Prix vocalist Bernie Shaw and keyboardist Alan Nelson. The band split after only one album, Throwing Shapes, released first in Japan in November 1984 and elsewhere in 1985. Bernie Shaw became the lead vocalist for Uriah Heep the following year.

The track "Run for Your Life" was featured on the soundtrack to the movie, Class of Nuke 'Em High.

== Discography ==
Throwing Shapes

Studio album by Stratus
- Released: 1984 [JPN]; 1985
- Recorded: Dreamboat Studios, Frankfurt, Germany, 1984
- Genres: Hard rock; heavy metal
- Length: 37:33
- Labels: Steel Trax (UK); CBS/Sony (Japan)
- Producer: Norman Goodman

- Throwing Shapes – 1985
  1. "Back Street Lovers" (3:51)
  2. "Gimme Something" (4:14)
  3. "Even if It Takes" (4:22)
  4. "Give Me One More Chance" (4:47)
  5. "Never Say No" (4:01)
  6. "Romancer" (3:22)
  7. "Enough Is Enough" (3:40)
  8. "Run for Your Life" (4:33)
  9. "So Tired" (4:46)

== Line-up ==
- Bernie Shaw – lead vocals
- Tino Troy — lead guitar, vocals
- Alan Nelson — keyboard
- Chris Troy — bass, vocals
- Clive Burr – drums, vocals

== See also ==
- List of new wave of British heavy metal bands
