= Raging Silence =

Studio album by Uriah Heep
- Released: 10 April 1989
- Recorded: December 1988–March 1989
- Studio: PRT Studios, Boathouse Studios, Rooster Studios, London, UK
- Genre: Hard rock
- Length: 44:34
- Label: Legacy (UK); Enigma (U.S.)
- Producer: Richard Dodd

Uriah Heep chronology
Equator (1985)	Raging Silence (1989)	Different World (1991)

Singles from Raging Silence
- 1. "Hold Your Head Up" Released: 24 April 1989; 2. "Blood Red Roses" Released: 24 July 1989

Professional ratings
Review scores
Source	Rating
AllMusic	2/5 stars
Collector's Guide to Heavy Metal	7/10

Raging Silence is the 17th album by British Rock group Uriah Heep. It marked the studio debut of Canadian vocalist Bernie Shaw and keyboardist Phil Lanzon, both of whom have remained with the band since. It was produced by Richard Dodd and the title is an allusion to the Manfred Mann's Earth Band album The Roaring Silence (1976). It was the first Uriah Heep studio album to have a contemporary release on CD.

It opens with the old Argent hit "Hold Your Head Up", although Mick Box was pleased to be able to add a guitar solo. This track was the lead single from the album. The second single was "Blood Red Roses", written by the band's erstwhile vocalist Pete Goalby. The 7" came as a poster-sleeve (UK cat. Legacy LGY 101) and had "Rough Justice" as the B-side. The 12" p/s came with a patch and also added a previously unavailable live version of "Look at Yourself" (UK cat. Legacy LGYT 101). The original vinyl had the lyrics on the inner-bag.

Many of the tracks were in the set on the contemporary tour, as documented in the video Raging Through the Silence, and some have been featured in subsequent sets.

== Track listings ==
No.	Title	Writer(s)	Length
1.	"Hold Your Head Up" (Argent cover)	Rod Argent, Chris White	4:33
2.	"Blood Red Roses"	Peter Goalby	4:10
3.	"Voice on My TV"	Mick Box, Phil Lanzon	4:20
4.	"Rich Kid"	Trevor Bolder	4:49
5.	"Cry Freedom"	Box, Lanzon	4:34
6.	"Bad Bad Man"	Lanzon	4:11
7.	"More Fool You"	Box, Lanzon	3:34
8.	"When the War Is Over" (Cold Chisel cover)	Steve Prestwich	5:09
9.	"Lifeline" (LeRoux cover)	Rod Roddy, Leon Medica, Fergie Frederiksen, Tony Haselden	4:53
10.	"Rough Justice"	Box, Lanzon, Bolder, Bernie Shaw	4:21

1998 remastered edition bonus tracks
No.	Title	Writer(s)	Length
11.	"Miracle Child" (B-side to "Hold Your Head Up")	Box, Lanzon, Bolder	4:11
12.	"Look at Yourself" (live recording from 1987, B-side on 12" "Blood Red Roses")	Ken Hensley	7:20
13.	"Too Scared to Run" (live recording in Moscow 1987, previously unreleased)	Box, Bob Daisley, Goalby, Lee Kerslake, John Sinclair	3:58
14.	"Corina" (live recording in Moscow 1987, previously unreleased)	Box, Lanzon, Shaw	4:46
15.	"Hold Your Head Up" (extended version)		5:53
16.	"Blood Red Roses" (alternate remix)		4:55
Total length:			75:37

2006 Expanded Deluxe Edition bonus tracks
No.	Title	Writer(s)	Length
11.	"Miracle Child" (B-side to "Hold Your Head Up")		4:11
12.	"Corina" (demo)		3:48
13.	"Mr. Majestic" (demo)	Lanzon	4:58
14.	"Pacific Highway" (demo)	Lanzon, Shaw	4:19
15.	"Blood Red Roses" (alternate remix)		4:55
16.	"Hold Your Head Up" (extended version)		5:53
17.	"Corina" (live recording in Moscow 1987)		4:42
Total length:			77:20

== Personnel ==
Uriah Heep

- Mick Box – guitar, backing vocals
- Lee Kerslake – drums, backing vocals
- Trevor Bolder – bass guitar, backing vocals
- Phil Lanzon – keyboards, backing vocals, lead vocals on single B-side "Miracle Child" & "Mr. Majestic", string arrangements on "When the War Is Over"
- Bernie Shaw – lead vocals

Additional musicians

- Brett Morgan – drums
- Frank Ricotti – percussion
- Maria Zackojiva – Russian spoken words on "Cry Freedom"

Production

- Richard Dodd – producer, engineer, arrangements with Uriah Heep
- Ashley Howe – pre-production engineer, arrangements with Uriah Heep
- Tim Young – mastering at CBS Studios, London

== Charts ==
Chart (1989)	Peak position
Swiss Albums (Schweizer Hitparade)	26
