= Sea of Light (album) =

- Cover art by Roger Dean

Studio album by Uriah Heep
- Released: 1 May 1995
- Recorded: 23 November – 20 December 1994; 24 January – 7 February 1995
- Studio: Karo Studios, Brackel, Germany
- Genre: Hard rock; progressive rock; heavy metal
- Length: 61:09
- Label: HTD (UK); SPV/Steamhammer (Europe and Japan)
- Producer: Uriah Heep and Kalle Trapp

Uriah Heep chronology
Different World (1991)	Sea of Light (1995)	Sonic Origami (1998)

Singles from Sea of Light
- 1. "Dream On" Released: 1995

Professional ratings
Review scores
Source	Rating
AllMusic	3/5 stars
Collector's Guide to Heavy Metal	10/10
Rock Hard	7.0/10

Sea of Light is the 19th album by the British rock band Uriah Heep, released on 1 May 1995. Its songs have remained part of the band's live set to this day. Bassist Trevor Bolder sang lead on "Fear of Falling" and delivered four songs for this album, as many as on the predecessor Different World, a count he never reached before or after. Roger Dean was responsible for the sleeve painting, his third for Uriah Heep.

== Track listing ==
No.	Title	Writer(s)	Length
1.	"Against the Odds"	Mick Box, Phil Lanzon	6:12
2.	"Sweet Sugar"	Trevor Bolder	4:43
3.	"Time of Revelation"	Box, Lanzon	4:02
4.	"Mistress of All Time"	Lanzon	5:33
5.	"Universal Wheels"	Box, Lanzon	5:39
6.	"Fear of Falling"	Bolder	4:38
7.	"Spirit of Freedom"	Box, Lanzon	4:14
8.	"Logical Progression"	Box, Lanzon	6:12
9.	"Love in Silence"	Box, Lanzon	6:48
10.	"Words in the Distance"	Box, Lanzon	4:46
11.	"Fires of Hell (Your Only Son)"	Bolder	3:56
12.	"Dream On"	Bolder	4:26

2013 remastered edition bonus tracks
No.	Title	Writer(s)	Length
13.	"She Still Calls His Name"	Box, Bolder, Lee Kerslake, Lanzon, Bernie Shaw	5:44
14.	"Sail the Rivers"	Bolder	6:55
15.	"Dream On" (single edit)	Bolder	3:31
Total length:			77:19

== Personnel ==
Uriah Heep

- Mick Box – guitars, backing vocals
- Lee Kerslake – drums, backing vocals
- Trevor Bolder – bass guitar, backing vocals, lead vocals on "Fear of Falling"
- Phil Lanzon – keyboards, backing vocals
- Bernie Shaw – lead vocals

Additional musicians

- Piet Sielck – additional keyboards
- Pete Beckett – additional backing vocals, strings arrangements on "Love in Silence"
- Rolf Köhler – additional backing vocals

Production

- Kalle Trapp – producer, engineer, mixing

== Charts ==
Chart (1995)	Peak position
German Albums (Offizielle Top 100)	87
Swiss Albums (Schweizer Hitparade)	29
