= Trevor Bolder =

English rock bassist, musician, songwriter and record producer (1950–2013)

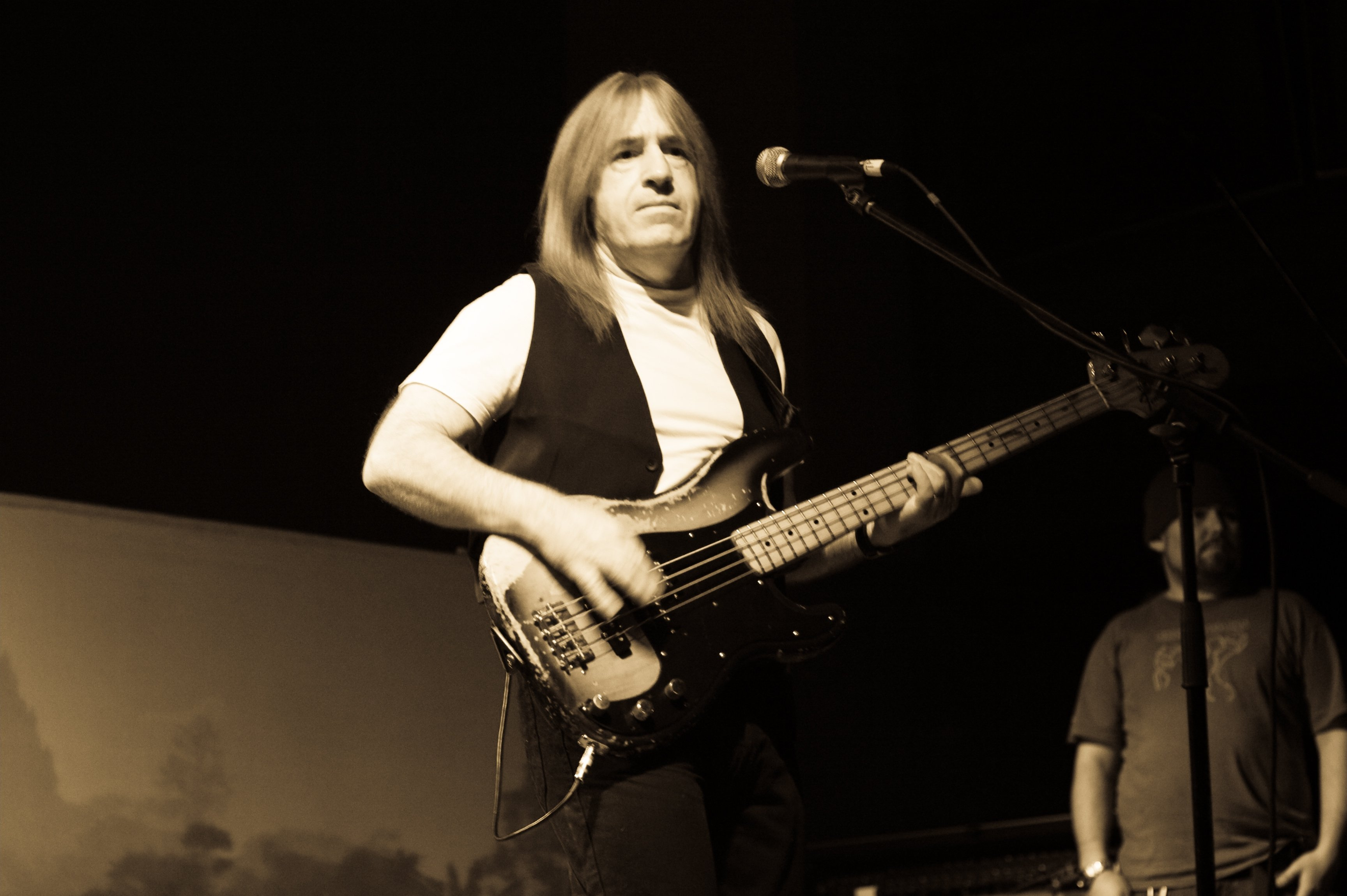
- Bolder in Milan, 9 November 2008

Background information
- Born: 9 June 1950; Kingston upon Hull, East Riding of Yorkshire, England
- Died: 21 May 2013 (aged 62) Cottingham, East Riding of Yorkshire, England
- Genres: Hard rock; glam rock; heavy metal; progressive rock; R&B (early)
- Occupations: Musician; songwriter; record producer
- Instruments: Bass; vocals; trumpet
- Years active: 1963–2013
- Label: RCA
- Formerly of: The Rats; David Bowie Band; The Spiders from Mars; Mick Ronson; Uriah Heep; Wishbone Ash; Cybernauts

Trevor Bolder (9 June 1950 – 21 May 2013) was an English rock musician, songwriter and record producer. He is best known for his long association with Uriah Heep and his tenure with the Spiders from Mars, the backing band for David Bowie, although he also played alongside a variety of musicians from the early 1970s.

== Biography ==
Bolder was born in Kingston upon Hull, East Riding of Yorkshire, England. His father was a trumpet player, and other members of his family were also musicians. He played cornet in the school band and was active in his local R&B scene in the mid-1960s. Inspired by the Beatles, in 1964 he formed his first band with his brother and took up the bass guitar.

He first came to prominence in the Rats, which also featured fellow Hull musician Mick Ronson on lead guitar. In 1971 Bolder was called in to replace Tony Visconti in David Bowie's backing band, which would soon be known as the Spiders from Mars; he subsequently appeared in D. A. Pennebaker's 1973 documentary and concert movie Ziggy Stardust and the Spiders from Mars. He is name-checked as "Weird" (Bowie's stage nickname for Bolder) in the song "Ziggy Stardust", in the lyrics "Ziggy played guitar, jamming good with Weird and Gilly, and the Spiders from Mars". Bolder "never looked comfortable as a glam-rock mannequin, tottering behind Ziggy Stardust in platform boots and a rainbow-hued outfit of latex and glitter".

Bolder's bass (and occasional trumpet) work appeared on the studio albums Hunky Dory (1971), The Rise and Fall of Ziggy Stardust and the Spiders from Mars (1972), Aladdin Sane (1973), and Pin Ups (1973), the Spiders' swan song with their leader. He went on to play on Mick Ronson's 1974 album Slaughter on 10th Avenue which made the British Top Ten.

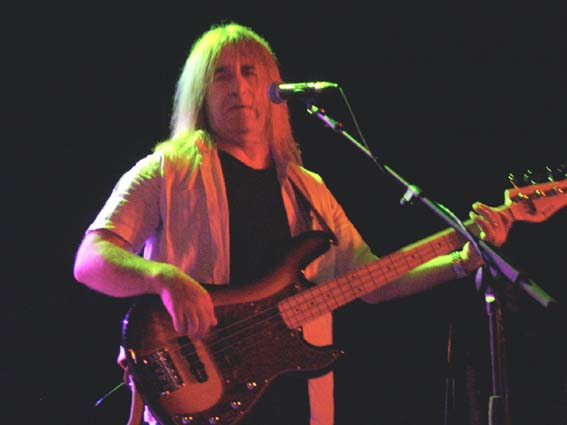
Bolder playing a Fender Precision Bass signature bass guitar in 2006

In 1976 Bolder joined Uriah Heep, replacing John Wetton. He worked on the albums Firefly, Innocent Victim, Fallen Angel and Conquest; when the line-up that had recorded the latter disbanded, he alone remained, along with Mick Box, guitarist, founder member, and legal owner of the band's name. The attempt to put a new line-up together temporarily stalled; and Bolder, needing to earn a living, accepted an offer in 1981 to join Wishbone Ash. Bolder had, coincidentally, again swapped places with John Wetton, becoming Wishbone Ash's bass player for their 1982 album Twin Barrels Burning. It was another short-lived connection, as by 1983 he returned to the rhythm section with Uriah Heep, playing on the Head First tour (although Bob Daisley played on the album) and all subsequent studio albums up to and including Into the Wild.

As well as his usual bass-playing and backing-vocal duties, Bolder produced Heep's 1991 album Different World.

In 2012 and early 2013, Bolder worked with Stevie ZeSuicide (Steve Roberts of the band U.K. Subs) as producer on singles "Wild Trash" (co-writer with ZeSuicide), "Lady Rocker" and a cover of "Ziggy Stardust". Bolder also played on these tracks.

Bolder died in May 2013 at Castle Hill Hospital in Cottingham from cancer, aged 62. He had undergone surgery for pancreatic cancer earlier that year.

In August 2025 his guitar flight case was featured as a restoration project on BBC One's The Repair Shop programme.

== Discography ==
Solo

- Sail the Rivers 2012-2013 (2020)

With David Bowie

- Hunky Dory (1971)
- The Rise and Fall of Ziggy Stardust and the Spiders from Mars (1972)
- Aladdin Sane (1973)
- Pin Ups (1973)
- Ziggy Stardust – The Motion Picture (recorded live 1973, released 1983)
- Santa Monica '72 (recorded live 1972, released 1994)

With Dana Gillespie

- Weren't Born a Man (1974)

With Mick Ronson

- Slaughter on 10th Avenue (1974)
- Play Don't Worry (1975)
- Memorial Concert (1997)
- Main Man (1998)

With The Spiders from Mars

- Spiders From Mars (1976)

With Ken Hensley

- Free Spirit (1980)
- From Time to Time (1994)

With Wishbone Ash

- Twin Barrels Burning (1982)

With Uriah Heep

- Firefly (1977)
- Innocent Victim (1977)
- Fallen Angel (1978)
- Conquest (1980)
- Equator (1985)
- Live in Europe 1979 (1986)
- Live in Moscow (live, 1988)
- Raging Silence (1989)
- Different World (1991)
- Sea of Light (1995)
- Spellbinder (live, 1996)
- Sonic Origami (1998)
- Future Echoes of the Past (live, 2000)
- Acoustically Driven (live, 2001)
- Electrically Driven (live, 2001)
- The Magician's Birthday Party (live, 2002)
- Live in the USA (2003)
- Magic Night (live, 2004)
- Wake the Sleeper (2008)
- Celebration – Forty Years of Rock (2009)
- Into the Wild (2011)
- Totally Driven (recorded 2000–2001, released 2015)

With Cybernauts

- Live (recorded live 1997, released 2000, reissued 2001 with an extra CD)
