= Equator (Uriah Heep album) =

Studio album by Uriah Heep
- Released: 25 March 1985 (UK); 18 July 1985 (US)
- Recorded: Battery Studios (27 August - 9 September 1984), London; Jacobs Studios (12 September - 26 October 1984), Farnham, Genetic Studios (12-26 January 1985), Reading, Berkshire, UK
- Genre: Pop metal
- Length: 46:20
- Labels: Portrait; Columbia (North America)
- Producer: Tony Platt

Uriah Heep chronology
Head First (1983)	Equator (1985)	Raging Silence (1989)

Singles from Equator
- 1. "Rockarama" Released: 4 March 1985; 2. "Poor Little Rich Girl" Released: 20 May 1985

Professional ratings
Review scores
Source	Rating
AllMusic	1.5/5 stars
Collector's Guide to Heavy Metal	6/10
Kerrang!	4/5 stars

Equator is the sixteenth studio album by English rock band Uriah Heep, released in 1985. It marked the studio return of bassist Trevor Bolder, who had rejoined the band for the Head First tour. The band also had a new record label, Portrait Records, a subsidiary of CBS. Equator was also the last Uriah Heep album to feature vocalist Peter Goalby and keyboardist John Sinclair.

The tour programme would be Heep's last in the UK until the Wake the Sleeper tour, which began in 2008.

When the Heep back catalogue was issued on CD in the early 1990s by Castle and then remastered, with bonus tracks, in the mid-to-late 1990s by Essential, Equator was conspicuous by its absence. This was because Sony/CBS wanted what was considered an extortionate sum for the rights. The album ultimately had a CD release in 1999, with no bonus material whatsoever. When the Essential remasters were expanded and reissued in the early 2000s by Sanctuary, Equator had to be passed over once again. However, in 2010, the album finally saw a release in expanded and remastered format on Lemon Recordings (subdivision of Cherry Red Records), in time for its 25th anniversary, thus finally ending remaster-series.

After this Uriah Heep took an extended break from the recording studio, and their next studio album would not appear until 1989.

== Track listing ==
All songs by Uriah Heep, except "Gypsy" by Mick Box and David Byron

Side one
No.	Title	Length
1.	"Rockarama"	4:20
2.	"Bad Blood"	3:33
3.	"Lost One Love"	4:40
4.	"Angel"	4:47
5.	"Holding On"	4:20

Side two
No.	Title	Length
6.	"Party Time"	4:20
7.	"Poor Little Rich Girl"	6:25
8.	"Skools Burnin'"	4:25
9.	"Heartache City"	4:59
10.	"Night of the Wolf"	4:31

2010 reissue bonus tracks
No.	Title	Length
11.	"Rockarama" (single edit)	4:03
12.	"Backstage Girl" (B–side)	4:19
13.	"Gypsy" (live recording from 1985)	4:42
14.	"Poor Little Rich Girl" (single edit)	3:58

== Personnel ==
Uriah Heep

- Mick Box – guitars, backing vocals
- Lee Kerslake – drums, backing vocals
- John Sinclair – keyboards, backing vocals
- Peter Goalby – lead vocals
- Trevor Bolder – bass guitar, backing vocals

Production

- Tony Platt – producer, engineer, Synclavier programming
- Gary Moberly – Fairlight programming
- John Hallett, Stephen McLaughlin, Phil Tennant, Paul Corkette, John Levell – assistant engineers

== Singles ==
"Rockarama" was released as a single, including a shaped picture-disc, and a video was made for the song. The B-side was non-album track "Backstage Girl". "Poor Little Rich Girl" was also released as a single, with live B-sides.

== Charts ==
Chart (1985)	Peak position
UK Albums (Official Charts)	79
