= Take No Prisoners (David Byron album) =

Studio album by David Byron
- Released: March 1975
- Recorded: February 1975
- Studio: Morgan, London; Roundhouse, London
- Genre: Progressive rock, hard rock
- Length: 40:17
- Label: Bronze (UK original release); Repertoire (UK 1992 reissue); Mercury (U.S.)
- Producer: Peter Gallen; David Byron

David Byron chronology
Take No Prisoners (1975)	Baby Faced Killer (1978)

Professional ratings
Review scores
Source	Rating
Allmusic	3/5 stars

Take No Prisoners is the debut solo album of British rock singer David Byron. It was released while he was still vocalist for Uriah Heep, and features Heep bandmates Mick Box and Lee Kerslake, as well as Ken Hensley and John Wetton on select tracks.

== Track listing ==
Side one
No.	Title	Writer(s)	Length
1.	"Man Full of Yesterdays"	David Byron; Mick Box; Lou Stonebridge	5:36
2.	"Sweet Rock 'n' Roll"	Stonebridge; McGuinness	2:49
3.	"Steamin' Along"	Byron; Box; Denny Ball; Pete Thompson; Stonebridge	5:09
4.	"Silver White Man"	Byron	3:29
5.	"Love Song"	Byron; Box; Lee Kerslake; Stonebridge	2:56

Side two
No.	Title	Writer(s)	Length
1.	"Midnight Flyer"	Stonebridge; McGuinness	5:55
2.	"Saturday Night"	Stonebridge	2:16
3.	"Roller Coaster"	Byron; Box; Ball; Kerslake; Stonebridge	3:58
4.	"Stop (Think What You're Doing)"	Byron; Stonebridge; McGuinness	4:16
5.	"Hit Me with a White One"	Byron; Box; Stonebridge	3:53

- Sides one and two were combined as tracks 1–10 on CD reissues.

Bonus tracks (2011 CD reissue)
No.	Title	Length
11.	"Steamin' Along" (single version)
12.	"What's Goin' On" (studio outtake)
13.	"Silver White Man" (alternate version)

== Personnel ==
- David Byron – vocals & backing vocals (all tracks but 2,9)
- Mick Box – guitars
- Lou Stonebridge – keyboards & backing vocals (all tracks but 2,9)
- Denny Ball – bass & backing vocals (all tracks but 2,9)
- Lee Kerslake – drums (all tracks but 2,3,4,6) & backing vocals (all tracks but 2,9)
- Pete Thompson – drums (tracks: 2,3,4,6)
- Ken Hensley – acoustic guitar (track 10)
- John Wetton – mellotron (tracks 1,5)
- Chanter Sisters – backing vocals (tracks 2,9)
- Martha Smith – backing vocals (tracks 2,9)
- Neil Lancaster – backing vocals (tracks 2,9)
- Chas Mills – backing vocals (tracks 2,9)
- Russ Stone – backing vocals (tracks 2,9)

== Production ==
- Produced by David Byron and Peter Gallen
- Ashley Howe – engineer
- Dave Harris – assistant engineer
- Trevor Hallesy – assistant engineer
- John Gallen – assistant engineer
- Dell Roll – equipment
- Pete Gibbs – equipment
