= Loud, Proud & Heavy: The Best of Uriah Heep =

Compilation album by Uriah Heep
- Released: 11 June 2007
- Genre: Hard rock, progressive rock, arena rock
- Label: Metro Triples

Uriah Heep compilation chronology
The Very Best Of (2007)	Loud, Proud & Heavy: The Best of Uriah Heep (2007)	The Definitive Collection (2007)

Loud, Proud & Heavy: The Best of Uriah Heep is a 2007 3CD compilation of tracks spanning the history of Uriah Heep from 1970 to 1991.

Professional ratings
Review scores
Source	Rating
Record Collector	4/5 stars

== Track listing ==
=== CD1 ===
1. "Gypsy"
2. "Come Away Melinda"
3. "Wake Up (Set Your Sights)"
4. "Bird of Prey"
5. "High Priestess"
6. "Lady in Black"
7. "Love Machine"
8. "July Morning"
9. "Look at Yourself"
10. "Tears in My Eyes"
11. "The Magician's Birthday"
12. "The Wizard"
13. "Rainbow Demon"
14. "Easy Livin'"

=== CD2 ===
1. "Sweet Freedom"
2. "Stealin'"
3. "Return to Fantasy"
4. "Misty Eyes"
5. "One Way or Another"
6. "Can't Keep a Good Band Down"
7. "The Hanging Tree"
8. "Firefly"
9. "Been Away Too Long"
10. "Wise Man"
11. "Free Me
12. "Illusion"
13. "Free 'N' Easy"
14. "I'm Alive"
15. "Woman of the Night"

=== CD3 ===
1. "Fallen Angel"
2. "Been Hurt"
3. "Love or Nothing"
4. "Come Back to Me"
5. "Think It Over"
6. "Love Stealer"
7. "Feelings"
8. "Too Scared to Run"
9. "Running All Night (With the Lion)"
10. "Hot Persuasion"
11. "On the Rebound"
12. "That's the Way That It Is"
13. "Stay on Top"
14. "Heartache City" (live)
15. "Hold Your Head Up"
16. "Stand Back"
17. "Different World"
