= Sonic Origami =

Studio album by Uriah Heep
- Released: September 1998
- Recorded: 3 February – 27 April, 12 – 18 May 1998
- Studios: Chipping Norton Recording Studios, Oxfordshire, England
- Genres: Hard rock, progressive rock, heavy metal
- Length: 75:45
- Labels: Eagle; Spitfire (US); Victor (Japan)
- Producer: Pip Williams

Uriah Heep chronology
Sea of Light (1995)	Sonic Origami (1998)	Wake the Sleeper (2008)

Professional ratings
Review scores
Source	Rating
AllMusic	2.5/5 stars
Rock Brigade	8/10
Rock Hard	7.0/10

Sonic Origami is the 20th studio album by British rock band Uriah Heep and was released in September 1998.

The opening track, "Between Two Worlds", is dedicated to David Byron and Gary Thain, both members of Uriah Heep who died at a young age. It is the final Uriah Heep album to feature long-standing drummer Lee Kerslake, due to ill health forcing his departure from the band in 2007.

The limited-edition version of the CD contains one additional track.

== Track listing ==
All songs written by Mick Box and Phil Lanzon, except where noted.

No.	Title	Writer(s)	Length
1.	"Between Two Worlds"		6:29
2.	"I Hear Voices"	Trevor Bolder	3:55
3.	"Perfect Little Heart"		5:17
4.	"Heartless Land"	Box, Lanzon, Matthew Lanzon	4:44
5.	"Only the Young"	Bolder	4:43
6.	"In the Moment"		6:23
7.	"Question"		5:26
8.	"Change"		6:02
9.	"Shelter from the Rain"	Bolder	6:10
10.	"Everything in Life"	Box, Bolder, Lee Kerslake, Lanzon	3:15
11.	"Across the Miles" (Survivor cover)	Jim Peterik, Frankie Sullivan	5:13
12.	"Feels Like"		4:37
13.	"The Golden Palace"		8:29
14.	"Sweet Pretender" (bonus track on European and US editions)	Bolder	4:50

2013 remastered edition bonus tracks
No.	Title	Length
14.	"Sweet Pretender"	4:47
15.	"Heartless Land" (single edit)	3:59

== Personnel ==
Uriah Heep

- Mick Box – guitar, backing vocals
- Lee Kerslake – drums, backing vocals
- Trevor Bolder – bass guitar, backing vocals
- Phil Lanzon – keyboards, backing vocals, orchestral arrangements on "The Golden Palace"
- Bernie Shaw – lead vocals

Production

- Pip Williams – producer, arrangements with Uriah Heep
- Norman Goodman – engineer
- Stuart Campbell – additional engineering
- Tony Bridge – mastering at Whitfield Street Recording Studios, London

== Charts ==
Chart (1998)	Peak position
UK Rock & Metal Albums (Official Charts)	19
