= Into the Wild (Uriah Heep album) =

Studio album by Uriah Heep
- Released: 12 April 2011
- Recorded: December 2010–February 2011
- Studios: Liscombe Park Studio, Leighton Buzzard, Buckinghamshire
- Genres: Hard rock, progressive rock, heavy metal
- Length: 52:54
- Label: Frontiers
- Producer: Mike Paxman

Uriah Heep chronology
| Wake the Sleeper (2008) | Into the Wild (2011) | Outsider (2014) |

Into the Wild is the 22nd studio album by the British rock band Uriah Heep. It was first released in Japan on 12 April 2011 by Universal Music Japan with 12 tracks on SHM-CD and in Europe by Frontiers Records on 15 April 2011 with 11 tracks on a regular CD; the album was released on 3 May 2011 in America. A video for the single "Nail on the Head" was released to promote this album. In April 2011 Into the Wild entered the German Media Control Charts at No. 32. This marks the group's best chart entry in Germany since Uriah Heep's heyday, according to Blabbermouth. Uriah Heep toured in support of the album, with a US tour beginning in June. However, lead vocalist Bernie Shaw had to back out of some of the last tour dates due to health issues, and so his spot was briefly taken over by former vocalist John Lawton, who performed some shows with the band. Into the Wild is the last Uriah Heep album to feature bassist Trevor Bolder, who died in 2013.

== Critical reception ==
Professional ratings
Review scores
| Source | Rating |
|---|---|
| AllMusic | 3.5/5 stars |
| Blabbermouth.net | 9/10 |
| Rock Hard | 7.5/10 |

Response to the album has been mostly positive, many reviewers pointing, though, to its openly retrogressive appeal. "It's like Mick Box and the lads have spent the last thirty years listening to nothing but their own back catalogue and the Gillan-period Deep Purple albums", writes Brian Fischer-Giffin of Loud Online magazine, adding: "Overall however, this is really quite a good album that doesn't pander to any kind of modern trend whatsoever and wholly the type of album you'd expect from a band that's been in business longer than your dad has probably been alive." "Heep will never regain the historic impact they made in the early seventies, but this album is way too good to just tap the veterans on their shoulders and comforting/disgracing them with the words: 'Nice job gentlemen… for your age'", argued Lords of Metal e-Zine reviewer noting that "the positive energy of their live shows has been transformed excellently onto this new disc". According to Hard Rock Haven review, "the perennially underrated Mick Box delivers some first-rate guitar work here, and with each new album Bernie Shaw is becoming the definitive voice of Uriah Heep". According to Alan Holloway of Rock United Reviews, who rated the album a 7 out of 10, "despite a few niggles, however, this is a great album that should not be missed by anyone who has enjoyed Heep live or on record in the past."

== Track listing ==
All tracks are written by Mick Box and Phil Lanzon, except where noted.

| No. | Title | Writer(s) | Length |
|---|---|---|---|
| 1. | "Nail on the Head" | | 4:15 |
| 2. | "I Can See You" | | 4:13 |
| 3. | "Into the Wild" | | 4:20 |
| 4. | "Money Talk" | Lanzon | 4:44 |
| 5. | "I'm Ready" | | 4:14 |
| 6. | "Trail of Diamonds" | | 6:28 |
| 7. | "Southern Star" | Lanzon | 4:26 |
| 8. | "Believe" | | 5:09 |
| 9. | "Lost" | Trevor Bolder | 4:51 |
| 10. | "T-bird Angel" | | 4:01 |
| 11. | "Kiss of Freedom" | Lanzon | 6:13 |
| 12. | "Hard Way to Learn" (Japanese edition bonus track) | Bolder | 5:25 |

== Personnel ==
Uriah Heep

- Mick Box – guitar, backing vocals
- Trevor Bolder – bass guitar, backing vocals, lead vocals on "Lost"
- Phil Lanzon – keyboards, backing vocals
- Bernie Shaw – lead vocals
- Russell Gilbrook – drums, backing vocals

Production

- Mike Paxman – producer
- Steve Rispin – engineer
- Mark "Tufty" Evans – mixing at Wispington Studios, Cookham, Berkshire, UK

== Charts ==
| Chart (2011) | Peak position |
|---|---|
| Austrian Albums (Ö3 Austria) | 40 |
| Finnish Albums (Suomen virallinen lista) | 31 |
| German Albums (Offizielle Top 100) | 32 |
| Swedish Albums (Sverigetopplistan) | 29 |
| Swiss Albums (Schweizer Hitparade) | 42 |
| UK Independent Albums (Official Charts) | 21 |
| UK Rock & Metal Albums (Official Charts) | 11 |

== Release history ==
| Region | Date |
|---|---|
| Japan | 12 April 2011 |
| Europe | 15 April 2011 |
| North America | 3 May 2011 |
