= Innocent Victim =

Studio album by Uriah Heep
- Released: November 1977
- Recorded: July–September 1977
- Studio: Roundhouse (London)
- Genres: Hard rock; progressive rock
- Length: 38:48
- Label: Bronze
- Producers: Gerry Bron; Ken Hensley

Uriah Heep chronology
Firefly (1977)	Innocent Victim (1977)	Fallen Angel (1978)

Singles from Innocent Victim
- 1. "Free Me" Released: 21 October 1977

Professional ratings
Review scores
Source	Rating
AllMusic	2.5/5 stars
Collector's Guide to Heavy Metal	3/10
The Daily Vault	B

Innocent Victim is the eleventh studio album by English rock band Uriah Heep, released in November 1977 by Bronze Records in the UK and Warner Bros. Records in the US.

Although it did not chart in the US or UK, Innocent Victim went on to sell more than 100,000 copies in Germany alone, and reached No. 19 and No. 44 in New Zealand and Australia, respectively. The single "Free Me" was a No. 3 hit in New Zealand and also peaked at No. 3 in South Africa. "Free Me" was also Uriah Heep's only hit in Australia, reaching No. 9. Finally, it is one of the very few Western rock albums issued in the USSR (although as a self-titled one and with no cover artwork) before the perestroika, in 1980.

The eyes of drummer Lee Kerslake were used for the snake on the cover artwork. In the US, the sleeve was a live photomontage instead.

The album was remastered and reissued by Castle Communications in 1997 with two bonus tracks, and again in 2004 in an expanded deluxe edition including three live tracks recorded during the band's 1979 European tour (these are alternate versions to the ones released on the Live in Europe 1979 album).

== Track listing ==
All tracks are written by Ken Hensley, except where noted.

Side one
No.	Title	Writer(s)	Length
1.	"Keep On Ridin'"	Hensley, Jack Williams	3:40
2.	"Flyin' High"		3:19
3.	"Roller"	Trevor Bolder, Pete McDonald	4:41
4.	"Free 'n' Easy"	Mick Box, John Lawton	3:05
5.	"Illusion"		5:05

Side two
No.	Title	Writer(s)	Length
6.	"Free Me"		3:34
7.	"Cheat 'n' Lie"		4:54
8.	"The Dance"	Williams	4:49
9.	"Choices"	Williams	5:49

1997 CD remastered edition bonus tracks
No.	Title	Writer(s)	Length
10.	"Illusion / Masquerade (Full Unedited Version)" (Originally recorded as one track, but released as separate tracks – "Illusion" as album track and "Masquerade" as B-side on single "Free Me")		8:18
11.	"The River" (outtake)	Bolder, Box, Hensley, Kerslake, Lawton	3:10

2004 expanded deluxe edition bonus tracks
No.	Title	Writer(s)	Length
12.	"Put Your Music (Where Your Mouth Is)" (outtake)	Bolder, Box, Hensley, Kerslake, Lawton	2:57
13.	"Cheat 'n' Lie" (alternative live version)		5:58
14.	"Free Me" (alternative live version)		5:46
15.	"Free 'n' Easy" (alternative live version)	Box, Lawton	3:15

== Personnel ==
Uriah Heep

- Mick Box – guitars
- Ken Hensley – keyboards, guitars, backing vocals
- Lee Kerslake – drums, backing vocals
- Trevor Bolder – bass guitar
- John Lawton – lead vocals

Production

- Gerry Bron, Ken Hensley – producers
- Peter Gallen – engineer
- Mark Dearnley – engineer on track 9
- John Gallen, Julian Cooper – assistant engineers

== Charts ==
=== Album ===
==== Weekly charts ====
Chart (1977–1978)	Peak position
Australian Albums (Kent Music Report)	44
German Albums (Offizielle Top 100)	15
New Zealand Albums (RMNZ)	19
Norwegian Albums (VG-lista)	13

==== Monthly charts ====
Monthly chart performance for Innocent Victim
Chart (1981)	Peak position
Soviet Albums (Moskovskij Komsomolets)	1

==== Year-end charts ====
Chart (1978)	Position
German Albums (Offizielle Top 100)	37

1981 year-end chart performance for Innocent Victim
Chart (1981)	Position
Soviet Albums (Moskovskij Komsomolets)	3

=== Singles ===
Year	Single	Chart	Position
1978	"Free Me"	New Zealand Singles Chart	3
1978	"Free Me"	South African Singles Chart	3
1978	"Free Me"	Austrian Top 40 Singles	8
1978	"Free Me"	Swiss Singles Top 75	8
1978	"Free Me"	German Singles Chart	9
1978	"Free Me"	Australian Albums Chart	18

== Certifications ==
Region	Certification	Certified units/sales
Australia (ARIA)	Gold	20,000^{^}
Germany (BVMI)	Gold	250,000^{^}
^{^} Shipments figures based on certification alone.
