= Stealin' (Uriah Heep song) =

Single by Uriah Heep

from the album Sweet Freedom
- B-side: "Sunshine"
- Released: 17 August 1973
- Recorded: June–July 1973; Château d'Hérouville, France
- Genre: Hard rock
- Length: 3:15
- Label: Bronze
- Songwriter: Ken Hensley
- Producer: Gerry Bron

Uriah Heep singles chronology
"July Morning" (1973)	"Stealin'" (1973)	"Something or Nothing" (1974)

"Stealin'" is a song by British hard rock band Uriah Heep, from the concept album Sweet Freedom. The song was written by Ken Hensley, and it reached gold status in New Zealand. The B-side of the song is "Sunshine".

== Personnel ==
- David Byron – vocals
- Mick Box – guitars
- Ken Hensley – keyboard
- Lee Kerslake – drums
- Gary Thain – bass

== Chart performance ==
Chart (1973)	Peak position
New Zealand (Listener)	20
Norway (VG-lista)	9
U.S. Billboard Hot 100	91
West Germany (GfK)	40
