= Uriah Heep (band) =

English rock band

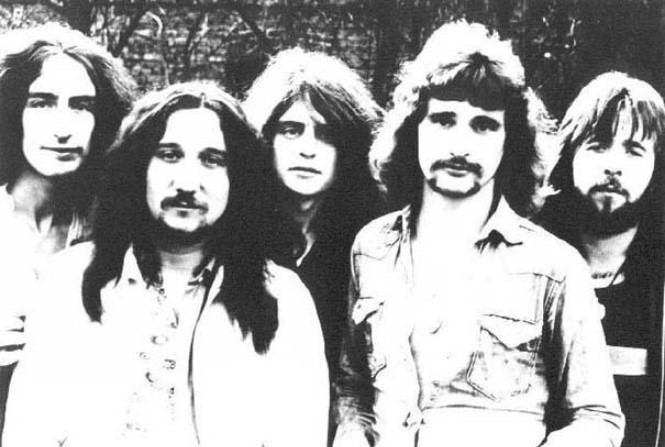
- Promotional image of the band's classic lineup in 1972 Left to right: Ken Hensley, Mick Box, Gary Thain, David Byron and Lee Kerslake

Background information
- Origin: London, England
- Genres: Hard rock; progressive rock; heavy metal
- Years active: 1969–present
- Labels: Vertigo; Bronze; Island; Warner Bros.; Mercury; Chrysalis; Sanctuary; Castle; Frontiers
- Members: Mick Box; Phil Lanzon; Bernie Shaw; Russell Gilbrook; Dave Rimmer
- Past members: List of Uriah Heep members
- Website: uriah-heep.com

Uriah Heep are an English rock band formed in London in 1969. Their current lineup consists of guitarist Mick Box, keyboardist Phil Lanzon, lead vocalist Bernie Shaw, drummer Russell Gilbrook, and bassist Dave Rimmer. They have experienced numerous lineup changes throughout their 57-year career, leaving Box as the only remaining original member. Former members of the band are vocalists David Byron, John Lawton, John Sloman and Peter Goalby; bassists Paul Newton, Mark Clarke, Gary Thain, John Wetton, Trevor Bolder and Bob Daisley; drummers Alex Napier, Nigel Olsson, Keith Baker, Iain Clark, Lee Kerslake and Chris Slade; and keyboardists Ken Hensley, Gregg Dechert and John Sinclair.

Uriah Heep were part of the early 1970s rock scene and have been referred to as major pioneers of the hard rock, heavy metal and progressive rock genres. The band have sold over 40 million albums worldwide, with over 4 million sales in the US, where their best-known songs include "Look at Yourself", "July Morning", "Easy Livin'", "Come Away Melinda", "The Wizard", "Sunrise", "Lady in Black", and "Gypsy". They also maintain a significant following and perform at arena-sized venues in the Balkans, Germany, Japan, the Netherlands, Russia and Scandinavia.

Uriah Heep have released twenty-five studio albums of original material, twenty live albums and forty-one compilation albums (including two greatest hits albums). Thirteen of the band's studio albums have made it to the UK Albums Chart (Return to Fantasy reached No. 7 in 1975), while of the fifteen Billboard 200 Uriah Heep albums, Demons and Wizards was the most successful (No. 23, 1972). By the late 1970s, Uriah Heep had massive success in Germany, where the "Lady in Black" single was a big hit.

== History ==
=== Early days (1967–1971) ===
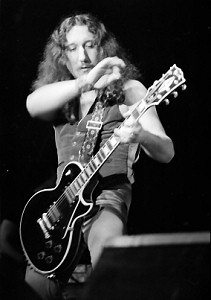
Mick Box in 1977

The band's origins go back to 1967 when 19-year-old guitarist Mick Box formed a band in Brentwood, Essex called Hogwash, which began playing in local clubs and pubs. When the band's singer left, drummer Roger Penlington suggested his cousin David Garrick (who knew the band) as a replacement. Box and Garrick formed a songwriting partnership and having higher musical aspirations than their colleagues, decided to give up their day jobs and go professional. They set up a new band called Spice. David Garrick changed his surname to Byron. Drummer Alex Napier joined, having answered a music paper ad; bassist Paul Newton of The Gods completed the line-up.

Spice avoided playing covers and according to Box, always strove "to do something original". Managed initially by Newton's father, the band climbed their way up to The Marquee level, then got signed by Gerry Bron (the Hit Record Productions Ltd.'s boss), who saw the band at the Blues Loft club in High Wycombe. "I thought they were a band I could develop and I took them on that basis", remembered Bron later. He became the band's manager and signed them to Vertigo Records, the newly formed Philips label. The four-piece found themselves booked into the Lansdowne Studios in London, still under the name of Spice. Then the name was changed to that of the well-known character from David Copperfield Uriah Heep (for, according to biographer Kirk Blows, "Dickens' name being everywhere around Christmas '69 due to it being the hundredth anniversary of his death"). According to Dave Ling's 2001 autobiography of the band, Wizards and Demons, The Uriah Heep Story, though the "Uriah Heep" moniker was chosen in December 1969, the band continued to play gigs as "Spice" until Ken Hensley joined in February 1970. Uriah Heep then decided to widen the sound. "We'd actually recorded half the first album when we decided that keyboards would be good for our sound. I was a big Vanilla Fudge fan, with their Hammond organ and searing guitar on top and we had David's high vibrato vocals anyway so that's how we decided to shape it", Box recalled. Gerry Bron brought in session player Colin Wood, followed by Hensley, a former colleague of Newton in the Gods, who was then playing guitar in Toe Fat. "I saw a lot of potential in the group to do something very different", remembered Hensley.

Their 1970 debut album, …Very 'Eavy …Very 'Umble (released as Uriah Heep in the United States), introduced Hensley's heavy organ and the band's guitar-driven sound, with David Byron's theatrical, dynamic vocals soaring above thunderous sonic backgrounds, although acoustic and jazz elements also featured in the mix. The album's title references the signature phrase of the Dickens character ("very 'umble"). Hensley had little to contribute to the debut: Box and Byron wrote most of the material, including "Gypsy", in many ways (according to Blows) "a marriage of contrasts" that, in time, became their trademark. In a 1989 interview, Mick Box recalled: "The funny thing was we wrote it at the Hanwell Community Centre and Deep Purple were rehearsing in the room next door to us. You can imagine the kind of racket we were both making between us." During the winter of 1970, three-quarters into the recording of the album, drummer Alex Napier was replaced by Nigel Olsson, recommended to Byron by Elton John. The debut was not popular with rock critics (especially in the US, where Rolling Stone reviewer Melissa Mills infamously promised to commit suicide "if this band makes it"). In the course of the album's making the writing relationship between Box, Byron and Hensley was beginning to develop. "It was very quick, because we were all into the same things. It was like it was meant to be, there was that kind of chemistry", Mick Box recalled.

When Nigel Olsson returned to Elton John's group in the spring of 1970, Keith Baker took his place. The band's second album, Salisbury (February 1971), was more squarely in the progressive rock genre, with its 16-minute title track featuring a 24-piece orchestra. One of the album's tracks, "Lady in Black", described by Donald A. Guarisco as "a stylishly arranged tune that builds from a folk-styled acoustic tune into a throbbing rocker full of ghostly harmonies and crunching guitar riffs", became a hit in Germany upon its re-release in 1977 (earning the band the Radio Luxemburg Lion award). Produced by Gerry Bron, the second album was significant for Ken Hensley's rise to the position of main songwriter.

In December 1970 Keith Baker left the band and was replaced by Iain Clark (from another Vertigo band, Cressida). With him the band toured Germany in late December 1970/January 1971 and made their first US tour in the spring of 1971, supporting Three Dog Night and Steppenwolf.

By this time, Gerry Bron's deal with Philips/Vertigo was over, so he set up his own label, Bronze Records. The third album was recorded in the summer months of 1971, during the band's three visits to Lansdowne. "It was the point in time when the band really found a solid musical direction", said Bron later. The third album, Look at Yourself, released in October 1971, marked the solidification of disparate ideas that had been a prominent feature of Salisbury and presented the unified sound and direction. "July Morning" has often been cited as the standout track. "I think that 'July Morning' is one of the best examples of the way the band was developing at that point in time. It introduced a lot of dynamics, a lot of light and shade into our sound", Ken Hensley said. The album peaked at No. 39 in the UK.

=== Success (1972–1976) ===
Lee Kerslake, David Byron, Gary Thain, Mick Box and Ken Hensley, 1973

By the end of 1971 it became clear, according to Hensley, that he, Byron and Box had become the tightly knit nucleus of the band. Feeling marginalised and having recently been badly shaken up when he was involved in an accident in Germany in one of the band's cars, first bassist Paul Newton left, in November 1971, and was briefly replaced by Mark Clarke. Newton recalled in a 2000 interview on Uriah Heep's website his departure: "Well, as you know, my father managed the band in the early days, with the Gods and Spice. He bought a lot of the gear and so on. When we became Uriah Heep and Ken joined the band – and Ken is the first to admit it – he had very definite ideas about what he wanted to do in a band. I suppose in some ways it was like the band was a vehicle which Ken needed and used to put his own ideas together. And there's nothing wrong with that as such. I mean, let's face it, the fact that what we did was successful was great for me too. But after a while you're bound to get some in-fighting in a situation like that. There were other problems too, because Gerry Bron was now the manager and my father was trying to get back some money from him – get some of his money back on the equipment and so on. There was a lot of unhappiness on all sorts of levels and everybody was unhappy in a lot of ways. I actually wanted to leave the band for quite a while before I actually left but I didn't. Anyway, with the heavy work schedules and the pressures and so on, I ended up collapsing on stage one night and the other members of the band decided I should go. It was funny because I didn't want to go and there was a lot of animosity but at the same time it was a tremendous relief".

During that same November, Iain Clark was replaced by Lee Kerslake, once of the Gods. New Zealander Gary Thain, a then member of Keef Hartley Band, joined Uriah Heep as a permanent member in February 1972 halfway through another American tour, replacing Mark Clarke who was exhausted and nearing a mental breakdown. "Gary just had a style about him, it was incredible because every bass player in the world that I've ever known has always loved his style, with those melodic bass lines", Box later said. Thus the "classic" Uriah Heep formed, and according to biographer K. Blows, "Everything just clicked into place."

The result of this newly found chemistry was the album Demons and Wizards, which reached No. 20 in the UK and No. 23 in the US in June 1972. While its title and Roger Dean's sleeve both suggested that the band was romantically working medieval myth into their songs—and surely songs like "Rainbow Demon" and "The Wizard" (co-written by Mark Clarke, during his short stay) did have thematic links with fantasy world – a more straightforward, hard-rocking approach was also apparent. To discard any possible insinuations concerning any kind of concept behind it, Hensley's note on the sleeve declared the album was "just a collection of our songs that we had a good time recording". Both critics and the band's aficionados hold the album in high regard, which, according to AllMusic, "solidified Uriah Heep's reputation as a master of gothic-inflected heavy metal". Ken Hensley remembered:

The band was really focused at that time. We all wanted the same thing, were all willing to make the same sacrifices to achieve it and we were all very committed. It was the first album to feature that line-up and there was a magic in that combination of people that created so much energy and enthusiasm.

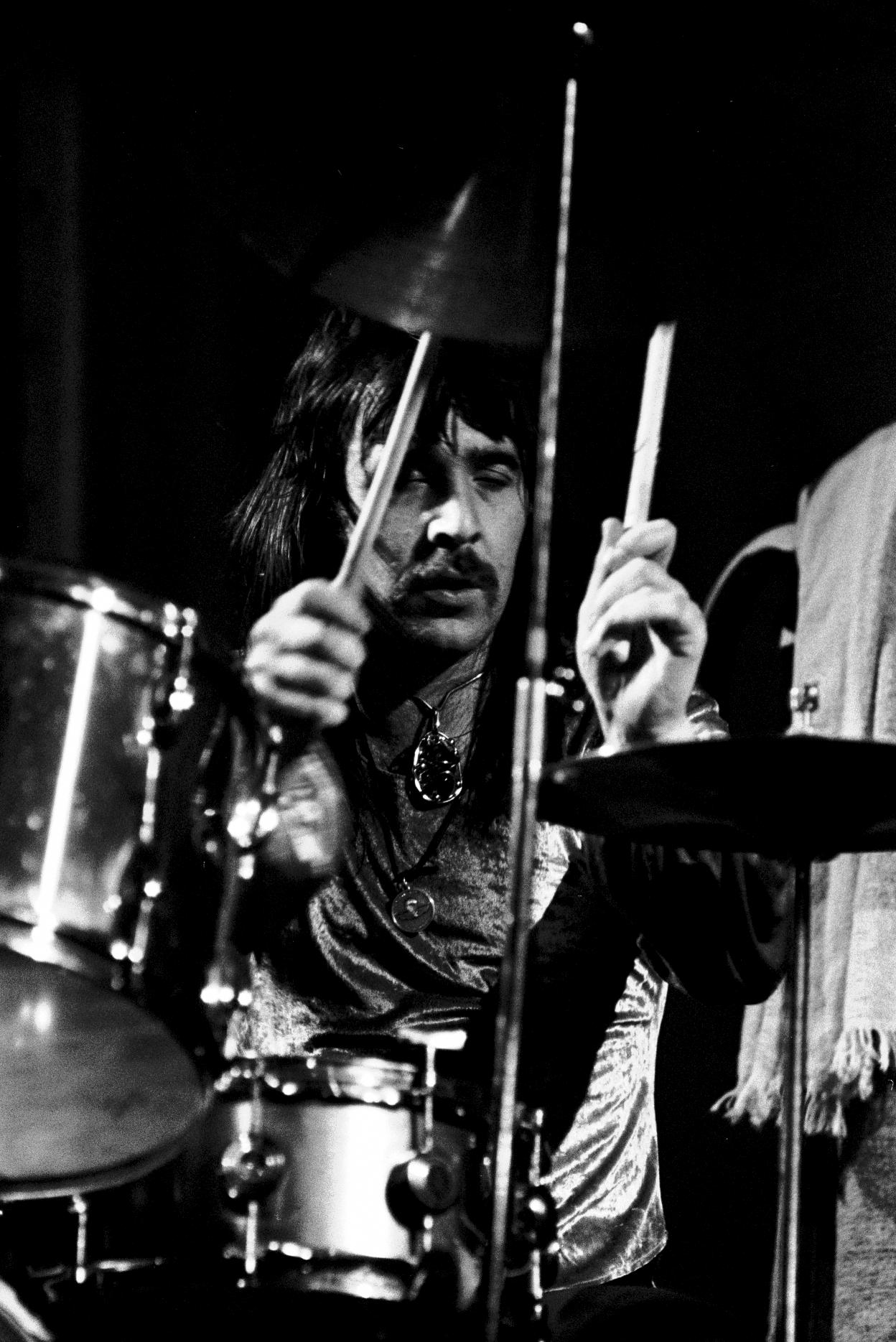
Lee Kerslake in 1973

Two singles were released from the album: "The Wizard" and "Easy Livin'", the second (a defiant rocker, according to Blows, "tailor-made for Byron's extrovert showmanship") peaked at No. 39 on the Billboard Hot 100.

Six months later, in November 1972, Uriah Heep's fifth studio album The Magician's Birthday (No. 28 UK, No. 31 US) came out, with "Sweet Lorraine" released as an American single and the title track (a multi-part fantasy epic featuring Hensley–Byron vocal duel and Box's extensive guitar solo in the middle) being the album's highlight. "Uriah Heep used to have an image, now they have personality", wrote Melody Maker in 1973. Much of it stemmed from the flamboyant Byron. "David was the communication point, the focal point of the whole group's stage presentation. He had so much charisma, so much ability", admitted Hensley many years later. But Hensley too developed into a sophisticated instrumentalist and stage persona, whose writing and keyboard flair ignited the rest of the band.

A lavishly packaged (an eight-page booklet plus) double album Uriah Heep Live followed, recorded at the Birmingham Town Hall in January 1973. Having completed another Japanese tour, the band (due to tax problems) went abroad to record to Chateau d'Herouville in France. It was there that the solid, but rather mainstream-sounding, Sweet Freedom (No. 18 UK, No. 33 US) was created with "Stealin'" released as a single. Having gained worldwide recognition, the band quit the fantasy world in lyrics and made an obvious stab at versatility by adding funk ("Dreamer") and an acoustic number along the lines of contemporary singer/songwriters ("Circus") elements to the palette. Ken Hensley meanwhile had been gradually recording his own, mellower material; his solo debut Proud Words on a Dusty Shelf was released the same year.

Wonderworld (June 1974), recorded in Munich's Musicland Studios in January, disappointed fans and band members alike. "Recording abroad disrupted the band's normal method of operation and that had a big negative effect on the group. Our communication was falling apart, we were arguing over stuff like royalties and we were getting involved in matters beyond music", Hensley said. Box remembered weeks spent in the studio as "dramatic" for all the wrong reasons. "David was drunk for most of the time, Kenny was having an emotional time of it and I was constantly trying to help them so it was difficult for me too. There was also a little bit of friction because (artistic) Kenny didn't like all the attention that (flamboyant) David was getting." Gary Thain was in even more serious trouble. According to Blows, "A strenuous touring schedule, compounded by the bassist's heavy drug dependency (inherent even before joining Heep) was taking its toll, though matters came to a head while on tour during September", when the bassist received a serious electric shock on stage in Dallas during a gig at Southern Methodist University’s Moody Coliseum on 15 September 1974. The rest of the US tour was then canceled and their UK dates rescheduled to October. Soon after going out of hospital, Thain, in Sounds, openly accused manager Gerry Bron of having turned Uriah Heep into a mere "financial thing" and was fired two months after the group's final gig of 1974 at New Theatre in Oxford on 14 December. A year later, on 8 December 1975, Gary Thain was found dead in his Norwood Green home, having overdosed on heroin.

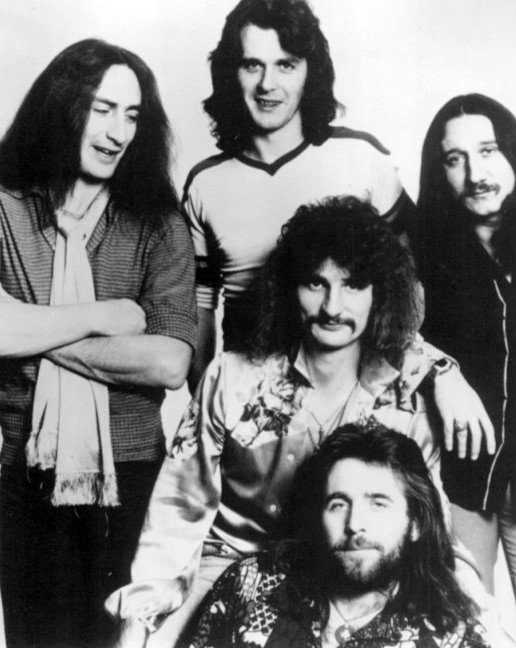
Uriah Heep in 1976

John Wetton (ex-Family and King Crimson) joined the band in March 1975 and with him Return to Fantasy (June 1975) was recorded; representing a revitalised Uriah Heep, it soared up to No. 7 in the UK. "It was a relief to have someone solid and reliable, and he had a load of ideas too", Box remembered. The following "Year-long world tour" (according to a headline in NME), was marred by a new accident. Mick Box fell off stage in Louisville, Kentucky, on 2 August 1975, breaking the radial bone in his right arm (but he persevered through both the set and the tour, receiving three injections a night). On 26 March 1976 at Roy Wilkins Auditorium in St. Paul, Minnesota, John Wetton had an accident of his own when he (like his predecessor, Thain) received an electric shock on stage.

In November 1975 The Best of Uriah Heep compilation was released, preceded by two solo albums: Byron's debut Take No Prisoners and Hensley's second, Eager to Please.

High and Mighty followed in June 1976. It was considered lightweight; even Box stated: "less of the 'eavy and more of the 'umble" (making pointed reference to Uriah Heep's self-description as "'umble" in Dickens' David Copperfield). The matter of production here became the point of major contention. With Bron committed to non-musical projects (including his air-taxi service) the band decided to produce the album themselves. The manager later insisted the result was Heep's worst album, while Hensley accused the manager of deliberately ignoring the band's interests. The album, though, was launched in the most lavish manner (with journalists and business people being flown off to the top of a Swiss mountain for a reception). However, it was not matched with the quality of live concerts, which were increasingly chaotic due to Byron's inconsistency on stage. "He'd always got drunk after the show but it had never got to the point where it would jeopardize the show itself. The performance had always been first and foremost with David. It was when the show started to come second that the problems began", Hensley remembered. "The distance between David and the rest had grown to unworkable proportions", according to Blows. "It's a tragedy to say it but David was one of those classic people who could not face up to the fact that things were wrong and he looked for solace in a bottle", commented Bron. In July 1976, after the final show of a Spanish tour, Byron was sacked. Soon bassist John Wetton announced he was quitting. Obviously he was not comfortable in the band, nor were his colleagues with him. Hensley later explained: "When he joined, we thought that we could replace a great bass player (Thain) with another great bass player, but we ignored the personality factor, which is crucial. It was like grafting on a new piece of skin but it just didn't work—the body rejected it."

=== Post-David Byron period (1976–1981) ===
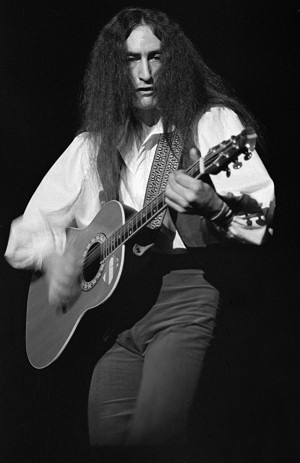
Ken Hensley in 1977

Uriah Heep recruited bassist Trevor Bolder (ex-David Bowie, Mick Ronson), and after having auditioned David Coverdale (Deep Purple, Whitesnake), Ian Hunter (Mott the Hoople) and Gary Holton (Heavy Metal Kids), brought in John Lawton, formerly of Lucifer's Friend and the Les Humphries Singers, with whom they turned totally away from fantasy-oriented lyrics and multi-part compositions back towards a more straightforward hard rock sound typical of the era. Box later said: "Image-wise he wasn't quite what we were looking for, but his pipes were perfect and so we went for the music end of it." Hensley agreed: "He had a voice that I thought would give a new dimension."

Firefly was released in February 1977, displaying "renewed effervescence and energy in unveiling what was clearly a new beginning for Heep" (per. K. Blows), "a new vigour and confidence" (according to a Record Mirror review) and also the new singer's abilities: the latter (according to AllMusic), although lacking the multi-octave range of David Byron, "boasted an impressive and emotionally rich hard rock voice that instantly jelled with the Uriah Heep sound". The band then toured the US supporting Kiss. Paul Stanley later recalled: "They were incredibly professional, and so consistent that their worst nights were excellent and their best were tremendous."

Innocent Victim, released in November 1977, "had a slight edge on Firefly" according to Box, but still in retrospect this "blend of sharp, short rockers and pop-friendly ballads" looked like "an attempt to court the American AOR market". The single "Free Me" (whose "acoustic style and accent on harmonies brought the group dangerously close to Eagles territory", according to AllMusic) became an international hit. In Germany the album sold over a million copies and became Uriah Heep's most successful, which coincided with the success of the re-released "Lady in Black". For some time during this period, there were three Uriah Heep singles sitting together in the German Top 20, these being "Wise Man" (from Firefly), "Lady in Black" and "Free Me".

In the end of 1978, Fallen Angel came out, having completed a hat-trick of studio albums to feature a consistent lineup (only the second time in their career that they had done so). "Too poppy" for Mick Box's liking (but still, "too eccentric to fit the bill of an AOR record", according to Allmusic), it was well received at the time (Sounds gave it 4 stars) but failed to chart. Meanwhile, the relative stability of the Lawton period belied the behind the scenes unrest having to do with Ken Hensley's earning much more than his colleagues. "Everything he wrote, he had to use… And if you insist in using everything you end up with substandard albums", disgruntled Box opined. The major rift, though, developed between Hensley and Lawton. As K. Blows writes, "the combination of constant friction between the two (resulting in the nearest thing to violence the group had seen) and the constant presence of Lawton's wife on the road finally led to the vocalist getting the chop, shortly after playing the Bilzen Festival in Belgium in August 1979".

Ex-Lone Star John Sloman was brought in, a younger singer who played keyboards and guitar and was, in the words of Box, "an all rounder". But almost instantly, Lee Kerslake departed, after a row with Bron, whom the drummer accused of favouritism towards Hensley's material. Several tracks of the next album had to be re-recorded with a new drummer, Chris Slade (of the Manfred Mann's Earth Band). Conquest LP was released in February 1980 (worldwide except the United States, where it was never released) and received 5 stars from Record Mirror, but, according to Box, "was a difficult album to record" and represented "a confused Heep", even "a mess" (in the words of Trevor Bolder). The band went on the 10th Anniversary Tour with Girlschool as support and attracted respectable crowds. Hensley was very unhappy, primarily with Sloman, and he explained why:

The band had chosen John and I had opposed that decision. He was a good musician and he looked great but I thought he had little going for him vocally. The way that he interpreted songs were totally different to the way I had written them. I could understand wanting to move on but this was like the difference between Black Sabbath and Gino Vannelli. We weren't addressing our basic problems, in that we weren't re-establishing our musical direction and John definitely wasn't helping us to do that.

A meeting at the manager's office concerning the songwriting dissent was the last straw and, in September 1980, Hensley quit. Gregg Dechert, a Canadian who had worked with Sloman in Pulsar, came in and the band went on a 23-date tour of the UK. After recording an album's worth of unreleased material Sloman left, citing musical differences for a reason. He would later go on to work with UFO, Gary Moore and Robert Palmer. Hensley's acrimonious departure left the group in a state of collapse. Box and Bolder visited David Byron with attractive propositions. "We couldn't believe it when he said he didn't want to know", the guitarist remembered. Bolder, who by that time "had had enough of Gerry Bron and the management", decided to join Wishbone Ash. When Dechert and Slade left, Uriah Heep were down to just Mick Box with the name and contract.

=== Peter Goalby era (1981–1986) ===
Box remembered: "I locked myself in my flat for two days and drank myself senseless in complete self-pity. But I somehow managed to pull myself together and consider my options." First he rang Lee Kerslake (who in the meanwhile had co-founded Blizzard of Ozz with Ozzy Osbourne) and the drummer brought along with him bassist Bob Daisley. Then John Sinclair came in, whom Box knew from the times he was a member of Heavy Metal Kids, and who currently played with a Los Angeles band called Lion. The band's new vocalist became Trapeze's Peter Goalby. The latter had once auditioned for Uriah Heep and failed, ironically Hensley being the only band member who had supported him as a choice. "With us all contributing to the writing we forged our new direction", Box recalled.

Produced by Ashley Howe, the Abominog album (according to Blows) was "important ... in the way it pulled Heep out of the Seventies and thrust them into the Eighties with determination muscle", even if it sounded a bit too American. Released in March 1982 (and preceded in February by the Abominog Junior EP), it won favour with the critics. Sounds gave it a five star review, the newly established rock magazine Kerrang! declared it "the most mature and perhaps best album of their career", and in retrospect it is still seen as "one of the most consistent and engaging albums in the group's lengthy catalog". The album did relatively well in the American charts (No. 56) after its US release in September 1982, and the band successfully performed at the Castle Donington Monsters of Rock event a few weeks prior to this, on 21 August.

Head First (May 1983), produced again by Ashley Howe (who, according to Goalby, became "like the sixth member of the band"), followed much in the same vein, pursuing (according to AllMusic) "a similar combination of heavy metal firepower and AOR sleekness". Not long before its release Daisley left the band to return to Ozzy Osbourne, and Trevor Bolder re-joined Uriah Heep. Both albums, Abominog and Head First, updated the band's sound and generated a brief, newfound interest in Uriah Heep among younger heavy metal fans.

Uriah Heep toured the US supporting Rush, Judas Priest and Def Leppard, whose vocalist Joe Elliott remembered: "They were the best band that we've ever toured with either as a headline or support, because there was no ego, no pretentious kind of stuff. They were good in as much that we learnt a lot from them."

By this time Gerry Bron was Uriah Heep manager no longer (they were looked after by Neil Warnock in Europe and Blue Öyster Cult's management team in the US) and then, finally, Bronze Records collapsed under the weight of debts, which, according to Box, "cost Heep a lot of money". Massive Asian and South American tours followed before the band returned to the studio with producer Tony Platt and a new deal with CBS's Portrait label secured by new manager Harry Maloney. Meanwhile, David Byron died of a heart attack and liver disease on 28 February 1985 at the age of 38.

Equator (March 1985) sold poorly, due to the fact that "CBS just did a terrible job getting it into the shops", as Box saw it. On the other hand, what Kirk Blows described as "a solid piece of product that had the potential to do extremely well" was regarded less favourably by later reviewers. Jason Anderson, for one, argues that with this "lackluster" album, high only "in high-schmaltz rating", the band squandered the chance that Portrait gave it.

Totally exhausted and having serious voice problems, Goalby left in November 1985 after an Australian tour. "I loved and believed in Uriah Heep but it kicked the shit out of me in the end", were his parting words. Then John Sinclair quit, deciding to join Ozzy Osbourne, and keyboardist Phil Lanzon (Grand Prix, Sad Café) came in, fitting in immediately into the Box-envisaged scheme of things.

American singer Steff Fontaine, formerly of Christian metal band Joshua, joined in July 1986 but was criticised for being totally "unprofessional" (he missed, for some reason, a San Francisco gig) and was sacked in September 1986 after just one American tour. Fontaine's position was offered then to ex-Grand Prix, Praying Mantis and Stratus vocalist Bernie Shaw, and that in retrospect was a winning move. Shaw "felt honoured at being invited to join such a legendary band", while for Box "it was like everything falling into place".

=== New members, Raging Silence and Different World (1986–1993) ===
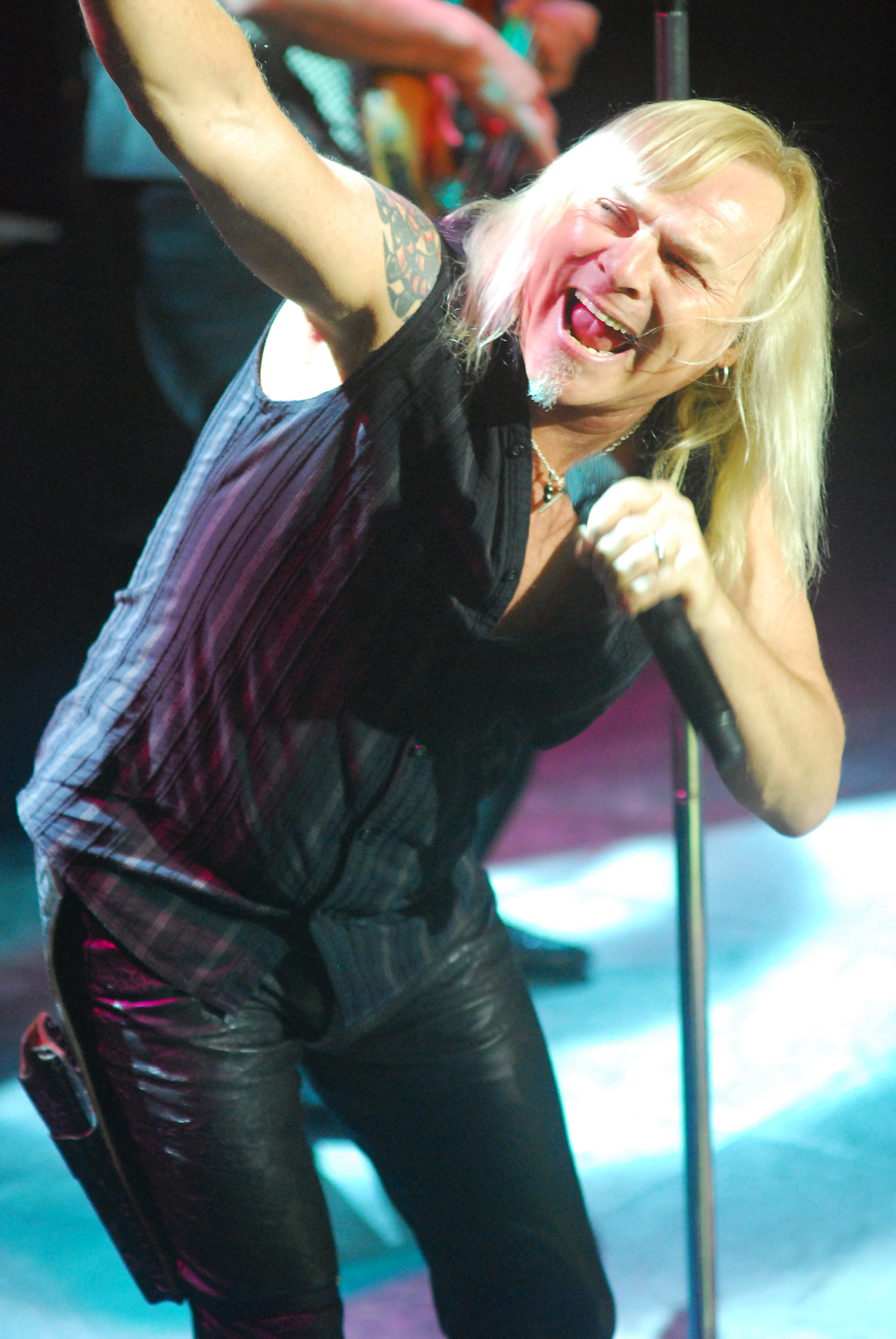
Bernie Shaw has been the singer of Uriah Heep since 1986.

The lineup remained unchanged from 1986 until 2007, with veteran Mick Box at the helm, Trevor Bolder on bass, Lee Kerslake on drums, vocalist Bernie Shaw and Phil Lanzon on keyboards. Their principal tour circuit has been in Germany, the Netherlands, Scandinavia, Japan and Russia. In December 1987 they became the first ever Western rock band to play in the Soviet Union, under Mikhail Gorbachev's policy of glasnost (Western pop acts Boney M, Cliff Richard, Nitty Gritty Dirt Band and Elton John had already played shows there in the late 1970s during the pre-Gorbachev era). At Moscow's Olympic Stadium the band played ten consecutive nights to a total of 180,000 people (following a reception that Bernie Shaw remembered as being "something like Beatlemania"), which was represented in the international press as not just an achievement for Uriah Heep but a major breakthrough for Western music in general. The concerts were recorded and issued as the Live in Moscow album, which included three new tracks. Ironically, it was this behind the Iron Curtain excursion that did well to re-establish Heep's name back at home. After a series of sell-out dates in Czechoslovakia, East Berlin and Bulgaria the band returned to Britain for the Reading Festival in August 1988 and toured the UK with the Dogs D'Amour.

Raging Silence, produced by Richard Dodd and released in May 1989, was followed by a return to the Soviet Union, concerts in Poland, East Berlin, six dates in Brazil and another British tour. "The last two years have been the most enjoyable of all my time in Heep", Trevor Bolder was quoted to say at the time. The band played in the Central TV studios in Nottingham on 29 November 1989 (the film was shown as part of the Independent TV series Bedrock and a few years later it was repeated in the Cue Music series) and celebrated its 20th anniversary with a series of compilations and re-issues.

Produced by Trevor Bolder and released early in 1991, Different World got a mixed reception from the press (put down in Kerrang!, hailed in Metal Hammer) and sold poorly. "Yet another technically sound but artistically bland recording from Uriah Heep" (according to AllMusic) failed to chart and marked the end of the band's contract with Legacy Records. Touring incessantly, the band issued some compilations of which Rarities from the Bronze Age and The Lansdowne Tapes (featuring previously unreleased material from the early 1970s) are considered most noteworthy. Still, the first half of the 1990s is regarded even by the Heep fans as "the wilderness years".

=== Sea of Light and Sonic Origami (1994–2006) ===
In late March and early April 1995, the band's former singer John Lawton briefly rejoined Uriah Heep for two weeks to tour South Africa and Austria with Deep Purple, filling in for Bernie Shaw, who was suffering from voice problems at the time.

The album Sea of Light (released in April 1995) produced by the band along with Kalle Trapp was well received and in retrospect is seen as the band's return to form, the key to success being (according to critic Donald A. Guarisco) the way it "forsook the ill-judged pop metal stylings of albums like Equator for a return to the gothic-tinged old-school metal style that highlighted classic Uriah Heep albums like Look at Yourself".

Produced by Pip Williams, Sonic Origami, originally issued in Europe and Japan in the fall of 1998, then, a year later, in the U.S., had "a grand, epic tone throughout" that, according to rock critic Steve Huey, "doesn't always match Uriah Heep's journeyman-sounding prog-tinged hard rock, still being a solid entry in its chosen genre". The release was followed by a successful European tour, which continued through 1999.

The band released The Legend Continues DVD and then toured the UK. A reunion gig with Ken Hensley and John Lawton took place in London on 7 December 2001 in the course of the Magicians Birthday Party, which since then became a tradition, even though Hensley never actually joined again.

Earlier in 2001, during the summer, the group embarked on its first US tour in seven years and returned the following year to headline both nights of Classic Rock Productions Classic Rock Festival at the Patriots Theater at the Trenton War Memorial in Trenton, New Jersey, on 5 and 6 October 2002, alongside Mostly Autumn, Asia, Karnataka, Focus and Nektar. Uriah Heep played an electric show the first night and an all acoustic show the second.

For most of the years that followed Uriah Heep have returned to Britain for a tour or just their annual showcase concert, the Magicians Birthday Party, which in 2003 was held at the now demolished London Astoria. All the while Mick Box acted as a manager for the band until, on 5 April 2005, they retained Simon Porter as their manager.

=== Wake the Sleeper and Into the Wild (2007–2013) ===
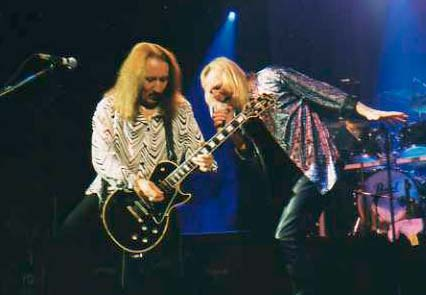
Mick Box and Bernie Shaw performing live in London

In early 2007, drummer Lee Kerslake had to leave the group due to ill health. In March of that year the band recruited Russell Gilbrook as their new drummer and immediately started recording a new studio album entitled Wake the Sleeper, where they used double bass drums in the songs Wake the Sleeper and War Child. Originally slated for a summer 2007 release, Universal Music finally released Wake the Sleeper on 2 June 2008.

In October 2009 Uriah Heep released their 40th-anniversary album Celebration – Forty Years of Rock, containing new studio recordings of twelve of their best known tracks, plus two brand new songs. "This collection underlines again that Uriah Heep are deserving great respect for their past achievements but far more importantly it makes it crystal clear that this is a band with a bright future as well as a glorious history", wrote Chris Kee in his 9/10 review in Powerplay magazine's February 2010 issue.

A United States tour for June/July 2010 was delayed due to immigration problems; the first two dates had to be rescheduled. This resulted in an appearance at B. B. King's in New York City as being the first date of the tour. Then Uriah Heep performed live on the Progressive Rock stage at the inaugural High Voltage Festival in London's Victoria Park on 25 July 2010. They played their 1972 album Demons and Wizards in its entirety, being joined by ex-Whitesnake man Micky Moody on slide guitar.

Uriah Heep released their 22nd studio album Into the Wild on 15 April 2011 in Europe (3 May in North America) via Frontiers Records.

Bassist Trevor Bolder died on 21 May 2013 after suffering from pancreatic cancer. He was 62 years old. British bassist John Jowitt (Ark, IQ, Arena) came in temporarily, followed by Dave Rimmer.

=== Outsider and Living the Dream (2013–2019) ===
In May 2013, when the band toured The Netherlands, Germany, Austria, Italy and Switzerland, they were again joined by their late 1970s era singer John Lawton, who was covering for Bernie Shaw taking time off for a routine medical procedure. Then both Bernie and John fronted the group for their show in San Javier, Spain on 12 July.

Uriah Heep entered the studio in January 2014 to begin recording their 23rd studio album Outsider, which was released in June 2014. The album featured new bass player Dave Rimmer, who had been a substitute for Trevor Bolder the previous year.

In March 2015 they went on the "Down Unda Tour" visiting Sydney, Melbourne, Perth, Adelaide, Brisbane and Auckland. On 25 September, they announced the release of their greatest hits album Totally Driven, a collection of re-recordings of classic Heep songs made in 2001, which was released on 12 November. On 15 October that year, the group played alongside Ken Hensley and Lee Kerslake at a special two-hour concert at Crocus City Hall in Moscow.

Swedish singer Stefan Berggren, from Berggren Kerslake Band (BKB), subbed for Bernie Shaw on lead vocals at the Rosenheim Festival in Germany on 14 July 2016 and again later that same year for a New Year's Eve festival in Sibiu, Romania, when Shaw had a family commitment.

2016 also saw the group play a few Japanese dates and the Legends Rock Cruise.

Former bass player John Wetton died on 31 January 2017 from colorectal cancer.

On 16 November 2017, it was reported that Uriah Heep would begin recording their 24th studio album, titled Living the Dream, with producer Jay Ruston. The album was released on 14 September 2018, and the band was set to embark on a world tour in support of it that would take them into 2019.

=== Chaos and Colour (2020–2024) ===
In a July 2020 interview with Sea of Tranquility, guitarist Mick Box and bassist Dave Rimmer confirmed that Uriah Heep were scheduled to begin recording their 25th studio album in early 2021. When asked about a possible release date, Box said: "I think release is all down to the record company, I've gotta be honest. We never get a shout on that. They always seem to have some reason to release it at this time, that time, whatever time." In November 2021, Box revealed that the recording sessions of the new album were finished and "over in L.A. now being mixed".

Two former Uriah Heep members died in 2020: Lee Kerslake after a long cancer battle on 19 September, and Ken Hensley after a short illness on 4 November. They had both each recorded a solo album earlier that year, posthumously released in early 2021. Another former member of Uriah Heep, vocalist John Lawton, died on 29 June 2021, at the age of 74.

On 27 January 2023, Uriah Heep released its 25th studio album, Chaos & Colour, which was preceded by the two singles "Save Me Tonight" and "Hurricane".

On a spring 2024 U.S. tour with Saxon, keyboardist Lanzon was called away due to family commitments. Adam Wakeman (son of Rick Wakeman) came in to fill in for Lanzon.

=== Farewell tour (2024–present) ===
On 19 September 2024, Uriah Heep announced that they would be embarking on a farewell tour, titled The Magician's Farewell, in celebration of their 55th anniversary. The tour started in February 2025 and is to last two to three years, with guitarist Mick Box stating that the band "intend[ed] to play as many places as possible."

== Musical style and influence ==
Uriah Heep's music has predominantly been described by critics and journalists as hard rock, progressive rock and heavy metal, with influences from acid rock, blues, and folk. Uriah Heep's distinctive features have always included a massive keyboard sound, strong vocal harmonies and (in the early years) David Byron's quasi-operatic vocals. In a 2018 interview, guitarist Mick Box cited "five-part vocal harmonies, Hammond organ and wah-wah guitar" as the main elements of the band's sound.

Uriah Heep have been cited as an influence by numerous acts, including Iron Maiden, Queen, Accept, Ghost, Fates Warning, Sodom, Death, Dio, King Diamond, Avenged Sevenfold, Krokus, Demons & Wizards (who were named after the band's album with the same name), Axel Rudi Pell and Fifth Angel.

== Band members ==
Current members

- Mick Box – guitar, backing vocals (1969–present)
- Phil Lanzon – keyboards, backing vocals (1986–present)
- Bernie Shaw – lead vocals (1986–present)
- Russell Gilbrook – drums (2007–present)
- Dave Rimmer – bass guitar, backing vocals (2013–present)

== Discography ==
Studio albums

- ...Very 'Eavy ...Very 'Umble (1970)
- Salisbury (1971)
- Look at Yourself (1971)
- Demons and Wizards (1972)
- The Magician's Birthday (1972)
- Sweet Freedom (1973)
- Wonderworld (1974)
- Return to Fantasy (1975)
- High and Mighty (1976)
- Firefly (1977)
- Innocent Victim (1977)
- Fallen Angel (1978)
- Conquest (1980)
- Abominog (1982)
- Head First (1983)
- Equator (1985)
- Raging Silence (1989)
- Different World (1991)
- Sea of Light (1995)
- Sonic Origami (1998)
- Wake the Sleeper (2008)
- Into the Wild (2011)
- Outsider (2014)
- Living the Dream (2018)
- Chaos & Colour (2023)
