= High and Mighty (album) =

Studio album by Uriah Heep
- Released: 21 May 1976
- Recorded: December 1975 – March 1976
- Studio: Roundhouse (London)
- Genre: Hard rock
- Length: 39:20
- Label: Bronze
- Producer: Uriah Heep

Uriah Heep chronology
Return to Fantasy (1975)	High and Mighty (1976)	Firefly (1977)

Singles from High and Mighty
- 1. "One Way or Another" Released: June 1976; 2. "Make a Little Love" Released: October 1976 (Norway)

High and Mighty is the ninth studio album by English rock band Uriah Heep, released in May 1976 by Bronze Records in the UK and Warner Bros. Records in the US. High and Mighty was the second and final Uriah Heep album to feature bassist John Wetton and the last to feature vocalist and founding member David Byron, who was fired later that year due to his troubles with alcohol and differences with band priorities. John Wetton takes the lead vocal on the single from the album, “One Way or Another”, and it is the only song on the album that was not sung by David Byron.

The original vinyl release was a single sleeve, with the lyrics reproduced on the inner liner.

The album was remastered and reissued by Castle Communications in 1997 with two bonus tracks, and again in 2004 in an expanded deluxe edition.

== Reception ==
Professional ratings
Review scores
Source	Rating
AllMusic	2/5 stars
Collector's Guide to Heavy Metal	4/10

The album was not well received, as stylistically it veered from their earlier fusion of progressive rock and heavy rock into more mainstream territory, lacking the group's signature lengthy compositions and fantastical, mythically orientated lyrical subject matter. "Several of the songs find the band flirting with pop elements in a way that doesn't complement their hard rocking style", said Donald A. Guarisco in his retrospective AllMusic review. He added that High and Mighty "shows flashes of the group's old firepower, but is ultimately sunk by a combination of unfocused experimentation and uneven songwriting". Martin Popoff called the album "effeminate, illogical, overblown, grasping for straws", citing only the song "One Way or Another" as "promising" and the rest a squandering of "the band's flickering talents".

== Track listing ==
All tracks are written by Ken Hensley, except where noted.

Side one
No.	Title	Writer(s)	Length
1.	"One Way or Another"		4:37
2.	"Weep in Silence"	Hensley, John Wetton	5:09
3.	"Misty Eyes"		4:15
4.	"Midnight"		5:40

Side two
No.	Title	Writer(s)	Length
5.	"Can't Keep a Good Band Down"		3:40
6.	"Woman of the World"		3:10
7.	"Footprints in the Snow"	Hensley, Wetton	3:56
8.	"Can't Stop Singing"		3:15
9.	"Make a Little Love"		3:24
10.	"Confession"		2:14

1997 remastered edition bonus tracks
No.	Title	Length
11.	"Name of the Game" (previously unreleased version)	4:59
12.	"Sundown" (alternate version)	3:20
Total length:		47:39

2004 deluxe edition bonus tracks
No.	Title	Writer(s)	Length
11.	"Name of the Game" (previously unreleased version)		4:59
12.	"Sundown" (alternate version)		3:20
13.	"Weep in Silence" (previously unreleased extended version)	Hensley, Wetton	7:46
14.	"Name of the Game" (demo)		3:21
15.	"Does Anything Matter" (demo "Woman of the World" early version)		3:20
16.	"I Close My Eyes" (demo)		4:18
17.	"Take Care" (demo "Footprints in the Snow" early version)		2:57
18.	"Can't Keep a Good Band Down" (edited version)		3:09
Total length:			72:30

== Personnel ==
Uriah Heep

- David Byron – vocals
- Mick Box – lead electric guitar, acoustic 6-string and 12-string guitars
- Ken Hensley – organ, acoustic and electric piano, Moog synthesizer, tubular bells, acoustic guitar, electric 12-string and slide guitars, pedal steel guitar, vocals
- Lee Kerslake – drums, percussion, vocals
- John Wetton – bass guitar, Mellotron, electric piano, backing vocals, lead vocals on "One Way Or Another"

Production

- Ashley Howe – engineer except track 1
- Peter Gallen – engineer on track 1
- John Gallen – assistant engineer
- Alan Corbeth – mastering at RCA Studios, London
- Mike Brown and Robert Corich – remastering (1997 and 2004 reissues)
- Shirtsleeve Studios – album art design

== Charts ==
Chart (1976)	Peak position
Australian Albums (Kent Music Report)	66
Dutch Albums (Album Top 100)	14
Finnish Albums (The Official Finnish Charts)	27
German Albums (Offizielle Top 100)	48
Norwegian Albums (VG-lista)	4
Swedish Albums (Sverigetopplistan)	21
UK Albums (Official Charts)	55
US Billboard 200	161
