= Wake the Sleeper =

Studio album by Uriah Heep
- Released: 2 June 2008
- Recorded: 2007
- Studios: Chapel Studios, Lincolnshire, UK
- Genres: Hard rock, progressive rock, heavy metal
- Length: 50:46
- Label: Sanctuary/Noise
- Producer: Mike Paxman

Uriah Heep chronology
Sonic Origami (1998)	Wake the Sleeper (2008)	Into the Wild (2011)

Professional ratings
Review scores
Source	Rating
AllMusic	3.5/5 stars
Blabbermouth.net	8/10
Metal Storm	8.6/10
Record Collector	4/5 stars
Rock Hard	8.0/10
World of Music	3/5 stars

Wake the Sleeper is the 21st studio album by the rock band Uriah Heep, released on 2 June 2008 in Europe and on 26 August 2008 in the United States. The announced September 2007 release was rescheduled (initially to March 2008) as a result of the purchase of Sanctuary Records by Universal Music. This was to allow proper promotion of the album, rather than it be 'lost' during the changeover and, although frustrating for them, was something the band members supported. It is their first studio album since 1998's Sonic Origami. It is also their first album since 1980's Conquest without long-time drummer Lee Kerslake, who had to withdraw from the band due to ill health in 2007, putting an end to the band's longest-lasting lineup which existed for 21 years.

== Background ==
This album was also released as a 12" vinyl album in a gatefold sleeve.

The song "What Kind of God" was inspired by the book Bury My Heart at Wounded Knee by Dee Brown (1970), which refers to the Wounded Knee Massacre.

Wake the Sleeper was nominated by the British magazine Classic Rock as the Album of the Year.

== Track listing ==
All songs written by Mick Box and Phil Lanzon, except where noted.

No.	Title	Writer(s)	Length
1.	"Wake the Sleeper"		3:33
2.	"Overload"		5:58
3.	"Tears of the World"		4:45
4.	"Light of a Thousand Stars"		3:57
5.	"Heaven's Rain"		4:16
6.	"Book of Lies"		4:05
7.	"What Kind of God"		6:37
8.	"Ghost of the Ocean"		3:22
9.	"Angels Walk with You"	Trevor Bolder	5:24
10.	"Shadow"	Lanzon	3:35
11.	"War Child"	Bolder, Tony Gallagher	5:07

== Personnel ==
Uriah Heep

- Mick Box – guitars, backing vocals
- Trevor Bolder – bass guitar, backing vocals
- Phil Lanzon – keyboards, backing vocals
- Bernie Shaw – lead vocals
- Russell Gilbrook – drums, backing vocals

Production

- Mike Paxman – producer
- Mark Evans – mixing
- Denis Blackham – mastering

== Charts ==
Chart (2008)	Peak position
Swedish Albums (Sverigetopplistan)	55
Swiss Albums (Schweizer Hitparade)	55
UK Rock & Metal Albums (Official Charts)	24

== Certifications ==
Region	Certification	Certified units/sales
Russia (NFPF)	Gold	10,000^{*}
^{*} Sales figures based on certification alone.
