= Mick Box =

English guitarist (born 1947)

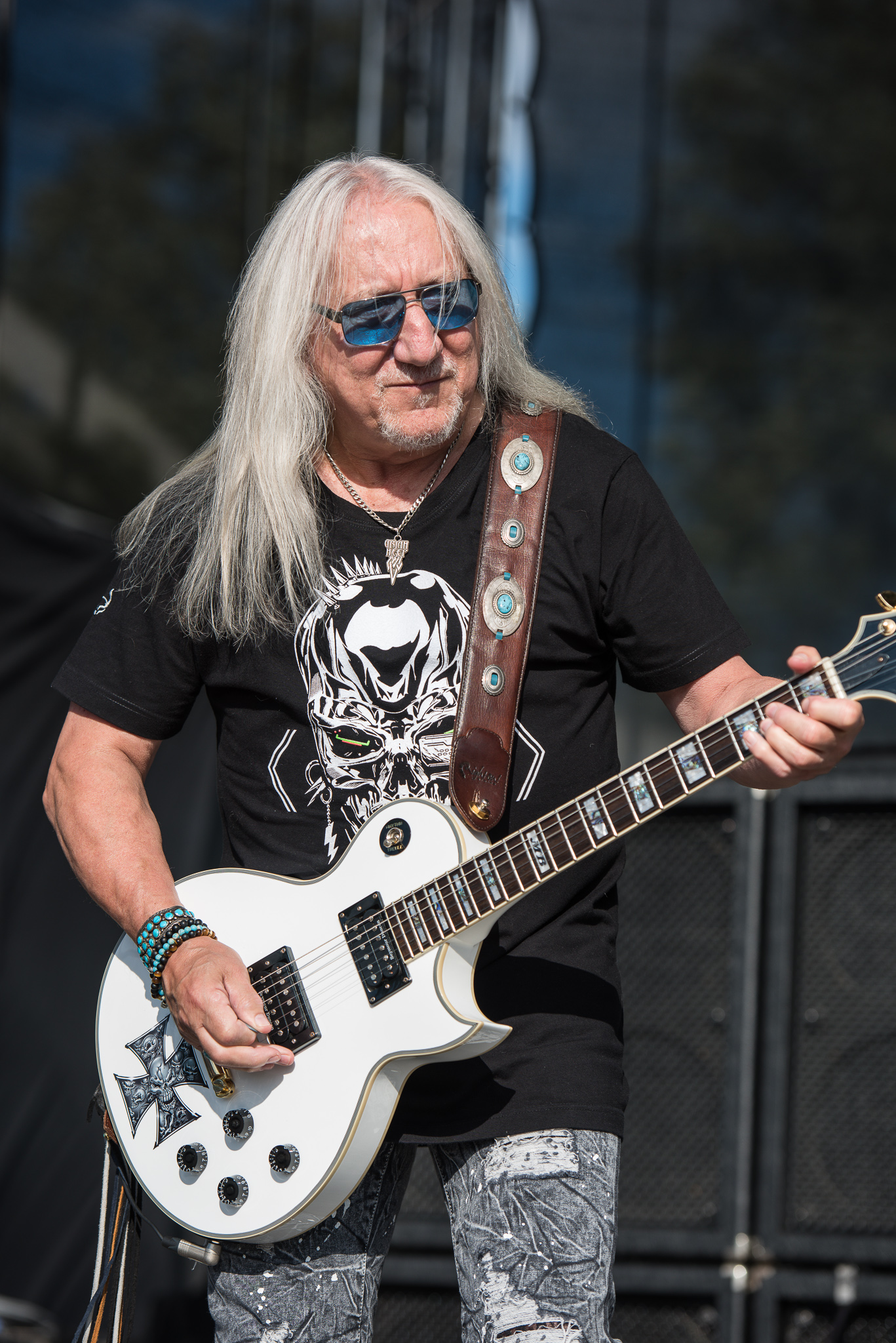
- Box performing in 2017

Background information
- Born: Michael Frederick Box; 9 June 1947 (age 79); Walthamstow, east London, England
- Genres: Hard rock, progressive rock, heavy metal
- Occupation: Guitarist
- Years active: 1964–present
- Website: mick-box.net

Michael Frederick Box (born 9 June 1947) is an English musician who is the founder and lead guitarist of rock group Uriah Heep, having previously been a member of The Stalkers and Spice, both with original Uriah Heep vocalist David Byron. He is the only member from the band's founding in 1969 who is still active with the group, and, following the deaths of Lee Kerslake and Ken Hensley in 2020, is also the last surviving member of the group's classic line-up.

== Early life ==
Mick Box was born in north London. His father was a carpenter.

== Career ==
Before establishing Uriah Heep, the band was called Spice. The band performed from 1968 to 1969 with David Byron and Nigel Pegrum. Box said they chose that name because they didn't want to get categorised into a narrow genre. "There's lots of spices, and that was our train of thought with the name of the band" said Box in a 2021 interview. After Ken Hensley joined the members of Spice, they became Uriah Heep in 1970.

When he started performing with Uriah Heep, other new bands included Black Sabbath, Deep Purple, and Led Zeppelin. The band would go on to be pioneers of prog rock and have sold over 40 million albums worldwide.

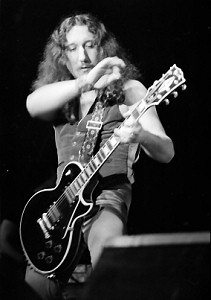
Mick Box in Norway, 1977

During a gig in Kentucky in 1975, Box fell off the stage and into the pit orchestra, dislocating his left arm to the point his bone was sticking out (his arm was put back in place after the concert ended), he continued to perform and during the gig a nurse came on stage and looked at his arm; when the show ended Mick stepped to the front of the stage, bowed down, and fell down into the pit a second time, this time breaking his right wrist in four places.

Box played guitar on David Byron's 1975 solo album Take No Prisoners and in 2002 with Bernie Shaw guest collaborated with the band Iris to perform the Uriah Heep song "Lady in Black".

With the deaths of Lee Kerslake and Ken Hensley in 2020, Box became the last surviving member of the classic line-up of Uriah Heep. In 2024, Box announced the band would go on a worldwide farewell tour that would last between two or three years and intended to go to as many places as possible.

== Personal life ==
Box lives in Palmers Green, north London with his fourth wife, Sheila. He has a son, born in 2000 or 2001. Box's first marriage ended due to problems around him always away from home either in a recording studio or on tour. He has previously lived in United States and Australia. He is five feet six inches tall and in the 1970s wore high stack boots to appear taller.

According to Box, the COVID-19 pandemic prevented a 50th Anniversary Celebration, but he said that he was planning on a 52-year Celebration. He said he felt strange being in quarantine, because he was accustomed to being "on the road," and interacting with fans at concerts. He used the time to compose songs and produced some videos for the Lockdown Diaries.

Mick stated that the deaths of Uriah Heep members Lee Kerslake and Ken Hensley, who died within a few weeks of each other, affected him dearly: "I can try to explain it, with someone like Lee, we were brothers from different mothers, his health declined over a period of five years, but it was still a shock. But with Ken and John, they were gone in seconds. There was no build-up to it at all, so both were a complete shocker."

"You start re-evaluating stuff, and I just thought, I'm going to keep my passion and spirit going here, because by doing so it allows their music to still be in focus. .

Box claims to own over forty guitars. He is an ambassador for the Nightingale Cancer Support Centre.

== Influences ==
Box said that he was influenced by Les Paul and Mary Ford, Django Reinhardt, Wes Montgomery, Tal Farlow and Barney Kessel. He attributes some of these influences to his first guitar instructor because he was the second guitarist for Django Reinhardt, as well as coming from a jazz background.

== Discography ==
=== With David Byron ===
- Take No Prisoners – 1975

=== With Uriah Heep ===
- ...Very 'Eavy ...Very 'Umble – 1970
- Salisbury – 1971
- Look at Yourself – 1971
- Demons & Wizards – 1972
- The Magician's Birthday – 1972
- Live '73 – 1973
- Sweet Freedom – 1973
- Wonderworld – 1974
- Return to Fantasy – 1975
- High and Mighty – 1976
- Firefly...1977
- Innocent Victim...1977
- Fallen Angel – 1978
- Conquest – 1980
- Abominog – 1982
- Head First – 1983
- Equator – 1985
- Raging Silence – 1989
- Different World – 1991
- Sea of Light – 1995
- Sonic Origami – 1998
- Wake the Sleeper – 2008
- Celebration – Forty Years of Rock – 2009
- Into the Wild – 2011
- Outsider – 2014
- Living the Dream – 2018
- Chaos & Colour – 2023

=== With Iris ===
- Lady in Black – 2002

=== With Spearfish ===
- Back for the Future – 2003
