= Russell Gilbrook =

English musician (born 1964)

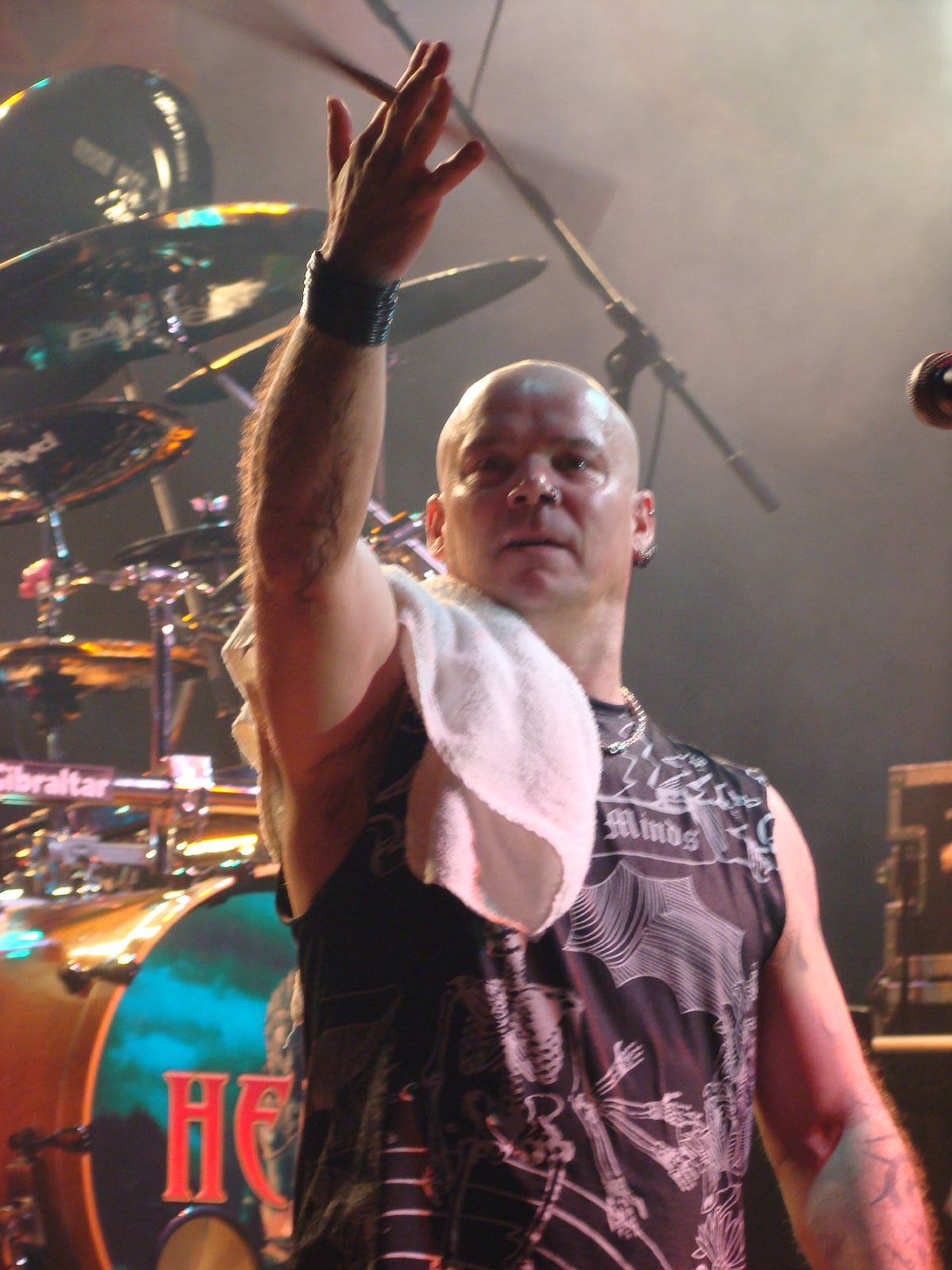
- Russell Gilbrook in 2008

Background information
- Born: 17 May 1964 (age 62); London, England
- Genres: Hard rock, progressive rock, heavy metal
- Occupations: Musician; Music Teacher
- Instrument: Drums
- Years active: 1984-present

Russell Gilbrook (born 17 May 1964) is an English musician, best known as the current drummer for the British rock band Uriah Heep.

Over the last few years, Gilbrook has been establishing himself on the UK clinic tour scene. He has supported artists such as Greg Bissonette and completed a tour with Liberty DeVitto. He has worked/toured with Chris Barber and his band and also Alan Price, on whose album, Liberty, Gilbrook featured. He also replaced Cozy Powell in Bedlam (where he played with the brothers Dave and Denny Ball, plus singer Frank Aiello). Gilbrook has also played with Pete Bardens and featured on one of his albums.

Gilbrook has also worked with Tony Iommi, Lonnie Donegan, John Farnham, Van Morrison, and Tobias Sammet.

Gilbrook teaches on the musician's channel on Sky Television and holds a position at the Brighton Institute of Modern Music. He has published several teaching guides. He has demonstrated specialist drum clinics across Europe.

Gilbrook has co-designed, with Marrell Drums, the bass drum beaters that he plays. He uses British Drum Company drums, Code drumheads, Baskey Drum Mats and Rug Lugs, Paiste cymbals and Pellwood drumsticks.

In 2012, it was announced that Gilbrook would be the drummer in the 2013 album of the metal opera project Avantasia, called The Mystery of Time.
