= Bernie Shaw =

Canadian-English singer (born 1956)

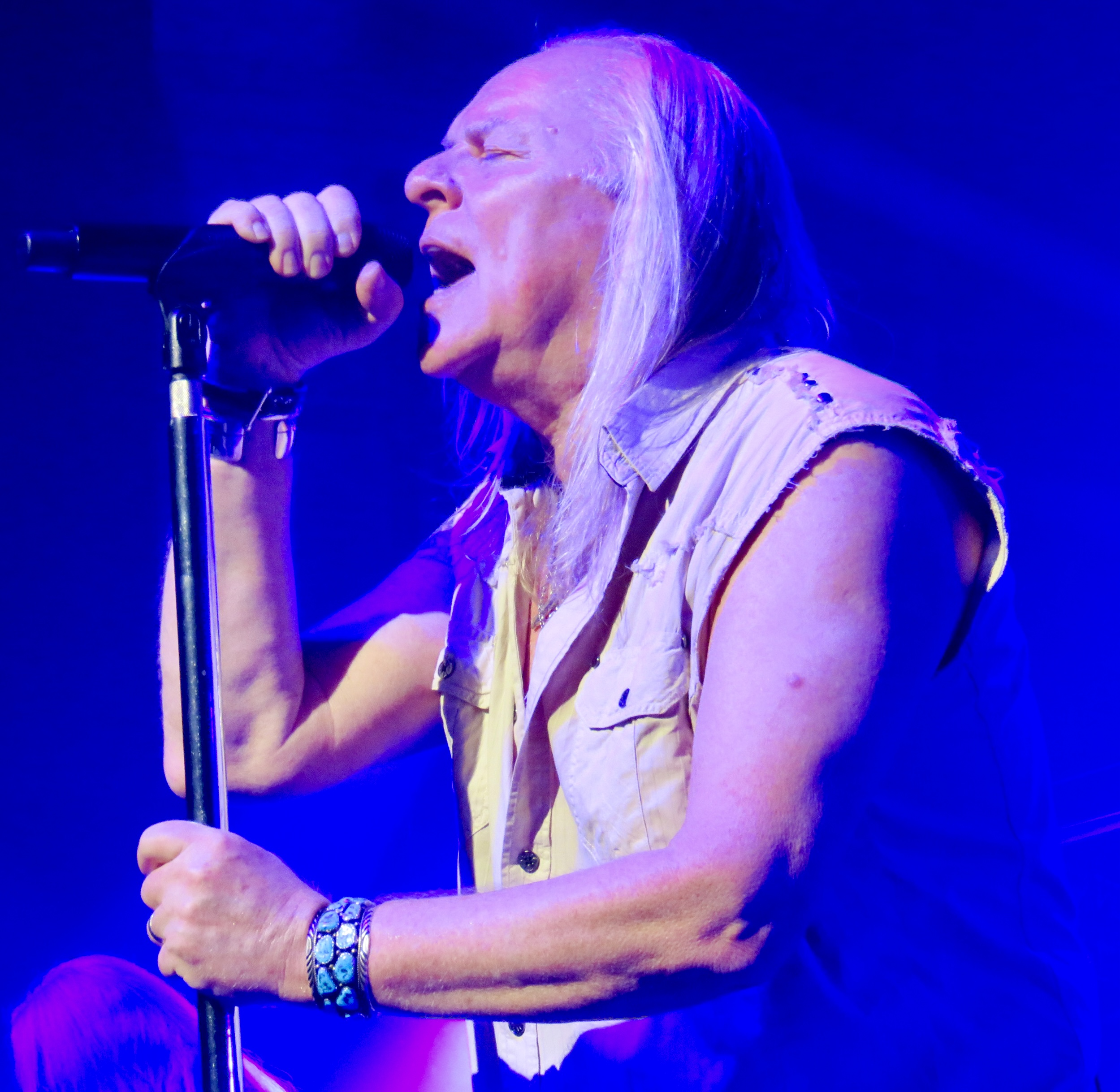
- Shaw in 2022

Background information
- Born: Bernard Shaw; 15 June 1956 (age 70); Victoria, British Columbia, Canada
- Genres: Hard rock, heavy metal, progressive rock
- Occupations: Singer, songwriter
- Years active: 1970–present

Bernard Shaw (born 15 June 1956) is a Canadian-English singer, and since 1986, the lead vocalist of British rock band Uriah Heep.

== Career ==
Shaw began his musical career in Victoria, British Columbia. In 1974, he joined the local band Cold Sweat as lead vocalist after initially auditioning as a guitarist. The group toured western Canada before disbanding in 1977. Later that year, he joined the Saskatoon-based band Legend for nine months before relocating to England in December 1978.

Upon arriving in London, Shaw joined the band Paris, formed by keyboardist Phil Lanzon. The band signed with RCA and renamed themselves Grand Prix. Shaw sang on their 1980 debut album Grand Prix before being replaced by Robin McAuley in late 1981.

In December 1981, Shaw joined Praying Mantis. He appeared on their 1982 EP Turn the Tables and performed with the group at the Reading Festival. Between late 1983 and 1984, he sang with Clive Burr's Escape, formed by former Iron Maiden drummer Clive Burr. The band rebranded as Stratus in July 1984 and released the album Throwing Shapes later that year.

In 1986, Uriah Heep guitarist Mick Box saw Shaw perform with Stratus at the London Marquee Club and invited him to audition following the departure of singer Steff Fontaine. Shaw joined the group later that year, making his recording debut on Live in Moscow (1988), which documented their 1987 tour as one of the first Western rock bands to perform in the Soviet Union. He has remained Uriah Heep's lead vocalist ever since, making him the longest-serving singer in the band's history. In 1995, Shaw underwent minor throat surgery, during which former Heep vocalist John Lawton temporarily filled in on tour dates in Austria and South Africa.

Outside of Uriah Heep, Shaw recorded the EP Picking Locks (1998) with the Collins~Shaw Project and featured on a 2001 re-recording of "Lady in Black" with the Romanian rock band Iris.
