= Sneak Me In =

Studio album by Lucifer's Friend
- Released: 25 April 1980
- Recorded: 1979–1980
- Studio: Mashville Studios, Maschen
- Genre: Hard rock
- Length: 36:30
- Label: Elektra
- Producer: Lucifer's Friend

Lucifer's Friend chronology
Rock Heavies: Lucifer's Friend (1980)	Sneak Me In (1980)	Mean Machine (1981)

Sneak Me In is the seventh album by Lucifer's Friend, an album in which Mike Starrs, formerly of Colosseum II, replaced John Lawton on vocals for a second time. This album and the previous Good Time Warrior (1978) were an attempt at a more commercial, accessible style which met with limited success. Starrs was replaced by the returning Lawton, for 1981's Mean Machine.

== Track listing ==
- All songs written and arranged by Lucifer's Friend.

Side One
No.	Title	Length
1.	"Goodbye Girls"	4:05
2.	"Sneak Me In"	3:11
3.	"Foxy Lady"	4:30
4.	"Love Hymn"	5:16

Side Two
No.	Title	Length
5.	"Stardancer"	5:14
6.	"Indian Summer"	5:16
7.	"Don't You Know what I Like"	3:58
8.	"Cosmic Crusader"	4:55

== Personnel ==
- Mike Starrs – lead vocals
- Peter Hesslein – guitars, backing vocals
- Peter Hecht – keyboards
- Adrian Askew – keyboards, backing vocals
- Dieter Horns – bass, backing vocals
- Herbert Bornholdt – drums & percussion
