= Belgun =

Belgun may refer to several places:

- Belgun, a village in the Bobicești Commune, Olt County, Romania
- Belgun, a village in the Kavarna Municipality, Dobrich Province, Bulgaria
