= Good Time Warrior =

Studio album by Lucifer's Friend
- Released: 1978
- Recorded: 1977–1978
- Genre: Hard rock
- Length: 42:19
- Label: Elektra

Lucifer's Friend chronology
The Devil's Touch (1976)	Good Time Warrior (1978)	Rock Heavies: Lucifer's Friend (1980)

Good Time Warrior is the seventh album by Lucifer's Friend, an album in which Mike Starrs, formerly of Colosseum II, replaced John Lawton on vocals for the first time. This album and the following Sneak Me In (1980) were an attempt at a more commercial, mainstream style which met with limited commercial success. Starrs was eventually replaced by the returning Lawton for 1981's Mean Machine.

== Track listing ==
1. Old Man Roller - 4:17
2. Meet You in L.A. - 4:05
3. My Love - 6:04
4. Good Times - 4:23
5. Little Dancer - 4:06
6. Sweet Little Lady - 4:38
7. Gamblin' Man - 4:31
8. Warriors - 10:11

== Personnel ==
- Mike Starrs – lead & backing vocals
- Peter Hesslein – electric & acoustic guitars, backing vocals & sailor lead vocal on “Warriors”
- Peter Hecht – acoustic piano, Hohner clavinet, Hammond organ, Roland String Ensemble, Roland electric piano, Polyphonic synthesizers, Minimoog, Fender Rhodes
- Dieter Horns – bass & Roland Space Chorus
- Herbert Bornholdt – drums, syndrums, percussion, backing vocals on “Warriors” and “Old Man Roller”
- Peter von Asten – backing vocals on several tracks
