= Mind Exploding =

Studio album by Lucifer's Friend
- Released: 1976
- Recorded: 1975–1976
- Genre: Hard rock; heavy metal; progressive rock
- Length: 38:58
- Label: Janus Records (in the US); Vertigo Records (in Europe)

Lucifer's Friend chronology
Banquet (1974)	Mind Exploding (1976)	The Devil's Touch (1976)

Professional ratings
Review scores
Source	Rating
Allmusic	1.5/5 stars

Mind Exploding is the fifth album by German hard rock band Lucifer's Friend. This album marks the point where they returned to a more hard rock oriented style with less of a progressive rock sound. It is more or less the missing link between I'm Just a Rock & Roll Singer (1973) and Banquet (1974); with the hard rock driven sound of the former, it still has the occasional horn section and progressiveness of the latter. This is the last album with John Lawton on vocals before he joined Uriah Heep. Lawton returned to Lucifer's Friend in 1981 to record the Mean Machine album.

== Track listing ==
Side One
No.	Title	Writer(s)	Length
1.	"Moonshine Rider"	Hecht, Hesslein, Lawton	4:47
2.	"Blind Boy"	Hesslein, Lawton	4:46
3.	"Broken Toys"	Hesslein, Lawton	5:53
4.	"Fugitive"	Hesslein, Lawton	4:55

Side Two
No.	Title	Writer(s)	Length
5.	"Natural Born Mover"	Horns, Mavros, Lawton	4:24
6.	"Free Hooker"	Hesslein, Lawton	7:17
7.	"Yesterday's Ideals"	Hecht, Lawton	6:54

== Personnel ==
- John Lawton – lead vocals
- Peter Hesslein – lead guitars, vocals
- Peter Hecht – keyboards
- Dieter Horns – bass guitar, vocals
- Curt Cress – drums
