= Sympathy (Uriah Heep song) =

Single by Uriah Heep

from the album Firefly
- A-side: "Sympathy"
- Released: 1977 (Germany)
- Recorded: 1976
- Genre: Rock
- Length: 4:44
- Label: Bronze
- Songwriter: Ken Hensley
- Producer: Gerry Bron

Uriah Heep singles chronology
"Wise Man" (1977)	"Sympathy" (1977)	"Free Me" (1977)

"Sympathy" is a song by English rock band Uriah Heep, which was originally released on their tenth studio album Firefly in 1977. The song was written by Ken Hensley and sung by John Lawton. It was released as a single in Germany, where it peaked at No. 37. The song was recorded and mixed at Roundhouse Recording studios in London between October and November 1976, just before beginning their US tour as support of Kiss in Macon, Georgia.

The song was written in the key of D minor.

== Personnel ==
- Mick Box – guitars
- Ken Hensley – keyboards
- Lee Kerslake – drums
- Trevor Bolder – bass guitar
- John Lawton – lead vocals
