= Firefly (Uriah Heep album) =

Studio album by Uriah Heep
- Released: March 1977
- Recorded: October–November 1976
- Studio: Roundhouse (London)
- Genre: Hard rock
- Length: 37:40
- Label: Bronze
- Producer: Gerry Bron

Uriah Heep chronology
High and Mighty (1976)	Firefly (1977)	Innocent Victim (1977)

Singles from Firefly
- 1. "Wise Man" Released: April 1977; 2. "Sympathy" Released: 1977 (EU)

Firefly is the tenth studio album by English rock band Uriah Heep. It was released in March 1977 by Bronze Records in the UK and Warner Bros. Records in the US. It was their first album without lead vocalist and founding member David Byron, and the first of three albums with new singer John Lawton, formerly of Lucifer's Friend. Bassist Trevor Bolder, formerly of the Spiders from Mars, the backing band for David Bowie, made his Uriah Heep debut on this album. Barring a break of about 18 months in the early 1980s, he remained with the group until his death in 2013.

The first single from the album was "Wise Man".

The original vinyl album was a gatefold sleeve, with a cardboard lyric liner.

The album was remastered and reissued by Castle Communications in 1997 with four bonus tracks, and again in 2004 in an expanded deluxe edition.

== Reception ==
Professional ratings
Review scores
Source	Rating
AllMusic	3/5 stars
Collector's Guide to Heavy Metal	3/10
Sputnikmusic	4.5/5 stars

A retrospective review by AllMusic said that the album "pursued a stripped-down sound harking back to the group's early-'70s successes," and concluded that "Firefly remains one of the most cohesive albums from Uriah Heep's mid- to late-'70s period". Martin Popoff in his Collector's Guide to Heavy Metal defined the album as "a mixed bag of scroungy, comatose blues ballads, nerdy party rockers and scary prog rock abortions", proving the intensification of "the deconstruction of a once great collective".

== Track listing ==
All tracks are written by Ken Hensley, except where noted.

Side one
No.	Title	Writer(s)	Length
1.	"The Hanging Tree"	Hensley, Jack Williams	3:40
2.	"Been Away Too Long"		5:03
3.	"Who Needs Me"	Lee Kerslake	3:39
4.	"Wise Man"		4:40

Side two
No.	Title	Length
5.	"Do You Know"	3:12
6.	"Rollin' On"	6:21
7.	"Sympathy"	4:44
8.	"Firefly"	6:21

1997 CD edition bonus tracks
No.	Title	Writer(s)	Length
9.	"Crime of Passion" (B-side of "Wise Man" single)	Hensley, Box, Kerslake	3:37
10.	"Do You Know" (previously unreleased demo version recorded in 1976)		3:16
11.	"A Far Better Way" (previously unreleased version different from the rough mix released on the Time of Revelation box set in 1996)	Hensley, Box, Kerslake, Bolder, Lawton	5:50
12.	"Wise Man" (TV backing track – previously unreleased mix originally used during an advertising campaign)		4:48

2004 deluxe edition bonus tracks
No.	Title	Writer(s)	Length
9.	"Crime of Passion" (B-side)	Hensley, Mick Box, Kerslake
10.	"A Far Better Way" (Demo Mix)	Hensley, Box, Kerslake, Bolder, Lawton
11.	"I Always Knew"	Hensley, Box, Kerslake, Bolder, Lawton
12.	"Dance Dance Dance"	Hensley, Box, Kerslake, Bolder, Lawton
13.	"Been Away Too Long" (Alternative Version)
14.	"Do You Know" (Demo Mix)
15.	"Who Needs Me" (Alternative Live Version)	Kerslake
16.	"Wise Man" (T.V. Backing Track)

== Personnel ==
Uriah Heep

- Mick Box – guitars
- Ken Hensley – keyboards, guitars, backing vocals, lead vocals on "Firefly"
- Lee "The Bear" Kerslake – drums, backing vocals
- Trevor Bolder – bass guitar
- John Lawton – lead vocals

Production

- Gerry Bron – producer
- Peter Gallen – engineer
- John Gallen – assistant engineer
- Gail Clarke – cover concept and coordination
- Martin White – cover painting

== Charts ==
Chart (1977)	Peak position
Danish Albums (Hitlisten)	12
Dutch Albums (Album Top 100)	17
Finnish Albums (The Official Finnish Charts)	21
German Albums (Offizielle Top 100)	17
Norwegian Albums (VG-lista)	6
Swedish Albums (Sverigetopplistan)	35
US Billboard 200	166
