= Time Warrior =

Time Warrior or Time Warriors may refer to:

- The Time Warrior, a 1973 Doctor Who serial
- Josh Kirby... Time Warrior!, a series of science fiction films released between 1995 and 1996
- Warrior on the Edge of Time, a 1975 album by Hawkwind
- Good Time Warrior, a 1978 album by Lucifer's Friend
- Time Warriors (video game)
- Time Warrior, a 2012 independent science fiction film.
