= Septemberist =

Septemberist or Septemberism may refer to:

- Septembrism or Setembrismo, a Portuguese political movement in the 1830s
- Dimitrovist Pioneer Organization "Septemberists", part of the Bulgarian pioneer movement
- Septemberists, insurgents involved in the September Uprising in Bulgaria in 1923
- "Septemberism", a 2010 song by Man Overboard from Real Talk

== See also ==
- Decemberist
- Octoberist
- Septemvriytsi (disambiguation)
