= Chelopechene =

Chelopechene may refer to the following places in Bulgaria:

- Chelopechene, Dobrich Province, a village in Dobrich Province
- Chelopechene, Sofia Province, a neighbourhood of Kremikovtsi, Sofia Province

== See also ==
- Chelopech, a village and municipality in Sofia Province, Bulgaria
