= Wise Man (song) =

Single by Uriah Heep

from the album Firefly
- Released: 15 April 1977
- Recorded: 1976
- Length: 4:40
- Label: Bronze
- Songwriters: Ken Hensley, Jack Williams
- Producer: Gerry Bron

Uriah Heep singles chronology
"One Way or Another" (1976)	"Wise Man" (1977)	"Sympathy" (1977)

"Wise Man" is a song by British rock band Uriah Heep. The song was written by Ken Hensley and Jack Williams for their album Firefly, which was released in February 1977. The song is also the first UK single with the band's new vocalist John Lawton. "Wise Man" was recorded at Roundhouse Recording Studios in London during October and November 1976, and was written in the key of A major.

== Personnel ==
- Mick Box – guitars
- Ken Hensley – keyboards
- Lee Kerslake – drums
- Trevor Bolder – bass guitar
- John Lawton – lead vocals
