= Jireček Point =

Point in the South Shetland Islands, Antarctica

Location of Smith Island in the South Shetland Islands.

Topographic map of Smith Island.

Jireček Point (Bulgarian: нос Иречек, romanized: nos Irechek, IPA: [ˈnɔs ˈirɛt͡ʃɛk]) is the point on the northwest coast of Smith Island in the South Shetland Islands, Antarctica forming the south side of the entrance to Cabut Cove and the northeast side of the entrance to Bourchier Cove. Situated 1.1 km south-southeast of Markeli Point and 2.35 km north-northeast of Villagra Point.

The point is named after the settlements of Irechek in northeastern and Irechekovo in southeastern Bulgaria, in connection with the Czech historian and Bulgarian educator Konstantin Jireček (1854–1918).

== Location ==
Jireček Point is located at 62°56′42.7″S 62°32′39″W. Bulgarian mapping in 2009.

== Maps ==
- Chart of South Shetland including Coronation Island, &c. from the exploration of the sloop Dove in the years 1821 and 1822 by George Powell Commander of the same. Scale ca. 1:200000. London: Laurie, 1822.
- L.L. Ivanov. Antarctica: Livingston Island and Greenwich, Robert, Snow and Smith Islands. Scale 1:120000 topographic map. Troyan: Manfred Wörner Foundation, 2010. ISBN 978-954-92032-9-5 (First edition 2009. ISBN 978-954-92032-6-4)
- South Shetland Islands: Smith and Low Islands. Scale 1:150000 topographic map No. 13677. British Antarctic Survey, 2009.
- Antarctic Digital Database (ADD). Scale 1:250000 topographic map of Antarctica. Scientific Committee on Antarctic Research (SCAR). Since 1993, regularly upgraded and updated.
- L.L. Ivanov. Antarctica: Livingston Island and Smith Island. Scale 1:100000 topographic map. Manfred Wörner Foundation, 2017. ISBN 978-619-90008-3-0
