= Banquet (album) =

Studio album by Lucifer's Friend
- Released: 1974
- Recorded: 1974
- Genres: Progressive rock; jazz fusion
- Length: 40:35 (LP Release), 37:17 (CD Release)
- Labels: Billingsgate Records (in the US); Vertigo Records (in Europe)
- Producer: Lucifer's Friend

Lucifer's Friend chronology
I'm Just a Rock 'n' Roll Singer (1973)	Banquet (1974)	Mind Exploding (1976)

Professional ratings
Review scores
Source	Rating
AllMusic	4/5 stars

Banquet is the fourth album by German progressive rock band Lucifer's Friend, released in 1974.

By this album the band had largely dropped the hard rock sound of earlier year, in favor of progressive rock mixed with jazz fusion. The song "Our World Is a Rock 'n' Roll Band" was the opening track on some versions (i.e. the U.S. version) of the original LP release, but the only CD releases to date do not include this track, which can instead be found as a bonus track on the Repertoire Records CD release of their self-titled debut.

== Track listing ==
No.	Title	Writer(s)	Length
1.	"Spanish Galleon"	Hesslein, Lawton	11:50
2.	"Thus Spoke Oberon"	Bacardi, Docker, Hesslein, Lawton	6:44
3.	"High Flying Lady - Goodbye"	Bacardit, Hesslein, Lawton, O' Brian-Docker	3:40
4.	"Sorrow"	Hesslein, Lawton	11:36
5.	"Dirty Old Town"	Hesslein, Horns, Lawton	4:46

=== U.S. Vinyl Release ===
Side One
No.	Title	Writer(s)	Length
1.	"Our World Is a Rock 'n' Roll Band"	Becker, O'Brian Docker	3:18
2.	"Spanish Galleon"	Hesslein, Lawton	11:50
3.	"Thus Spoke Oberon"	Bacardi, O'Brian Docker	6:44

Side Two
No.	Title	Writer(s)	Length
4.	"High Flying Lady - Goodbye"	Hesslein, Lawton	3:40
5.	"Sorrow"	Hesslein, Lawton	11:36
6.	"Dirty Old Town"	Horns, Hesslein, Lawton	4:46

== Personnel ==
=== Band ===
- John Lawton – lead vocals
- Peter Hesslein – electric and acoustic guitars, 12-string guitar, percussion, backing vocals
- Dieter Horns – bass, backing vocals
- Herbert Bornhold – drums, percussion, backing vocals
- Peter Hecht – piano, organ, Moog synthesizer, electric piano (Fender Rhodes)

=== Additional musicians ===
- Herb Geller – alto saxophone (track 1), flute (track 4)
- Karl-Hermann Lüer – baritone saxophone
- Stefan Dobrzynski – tenor saxophone
- Wilfried Schoberanzky – bassoon
- Klaus Holle – flute
- Franz Behle – oboe
- Rolf Lind – French horn
- Hans Alves – English horn
- Kurt Donocik, Luigi Schaufub, Walter Hillinghaus – cello
- Günter Fulisch, Heinz Reese, Waldemar Erbe, Wolfgang Ahlers – trombone
- Bob Lanese, Heinz Habermann, Manfred Moch – trumpet
- Bruno Korzuschek, Günter Grünig, Werner Knupke – viola
- Fritz Köhnsen, Günter Klein, Günther Zander, Heinz Donocik, Helmut Jochens, Helmut Rahn, Ingeborg Kaufmann, Otto Kaufmann, Reinhold Gabriel, Senia Daschewski – violin
- Dave Brian, Elvira Herbert, Sheila McKinley – choir

=== Production ===
- Lucifer's Friend – producer, arranger
- Peter Hecht – horns & strings arrangement
- Sebastian F.B. Dietrich – photography
- Volker Heintzen – engineer
