= Michael Starr =

Michael Starr may refer to:

- Michael Starr (politician) (1910–2000), Canadian politician
- Mike Starr (actor) (born 1950), American actor
- Mike Starr (musician) (1966–2011), American bassist
- Michael Starr (singer) (born 1965), American singer

== See also ==
- Mike Starrs, Scottish singer
