= Sveti Nikola (village) =

- Village
- Location within Bulgaria
- Coordinates: 43°26′03″N 28°29′35″E
- Country: Bulgaria
- Province: Dobrich Province
- Municipality: Kavarna
- Time zone: UTC+2 (EET)
  - Summer (DST): UTC+3 (EEST)
- Patron saint: Saint Nicholas of Myra

Sveti Nikola (Bulgarian: Свети Никола) is a village in Kavarna Municipality, Dobrich Province, northeastern Bulgaria. It has a population of around 206 people as of 2022.

== Geography ==
The village is located 63 meters above sea level in the Dobruja Plateau, 2.5 kilometers northwest of the Black Sea coast and 12 kilometers east of Kavarna.

Despite the proximity to the sea, winters are cold, windy and with a lot of snow and drifts. North winds prevail, with a breeze blowing in the summer.

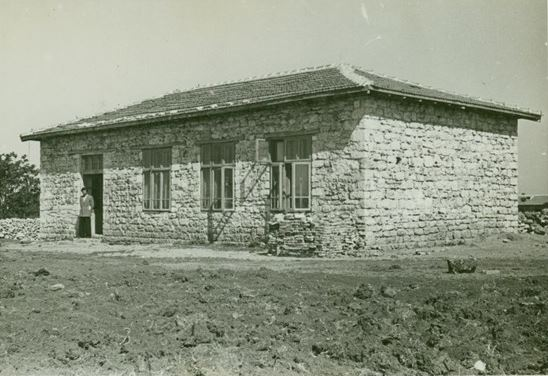
The village's primary school c. 1946

== History ==
The village is located in Southern Dobruja, which was part of the Kingdom of Romania from 1913 to 1940.

== Demographics ==
Unlike the nearby villages of Balgarevo and Kavarna, Sveti Nikola has no population of Gagauz people. In the 2011 census, 92.3% of the residents identified themselves as Bulgarians, 4.3% as Turks and 2.9% as Romani. Sveti Nikola has a population of around 206 people as of 2022.

== Economy ==
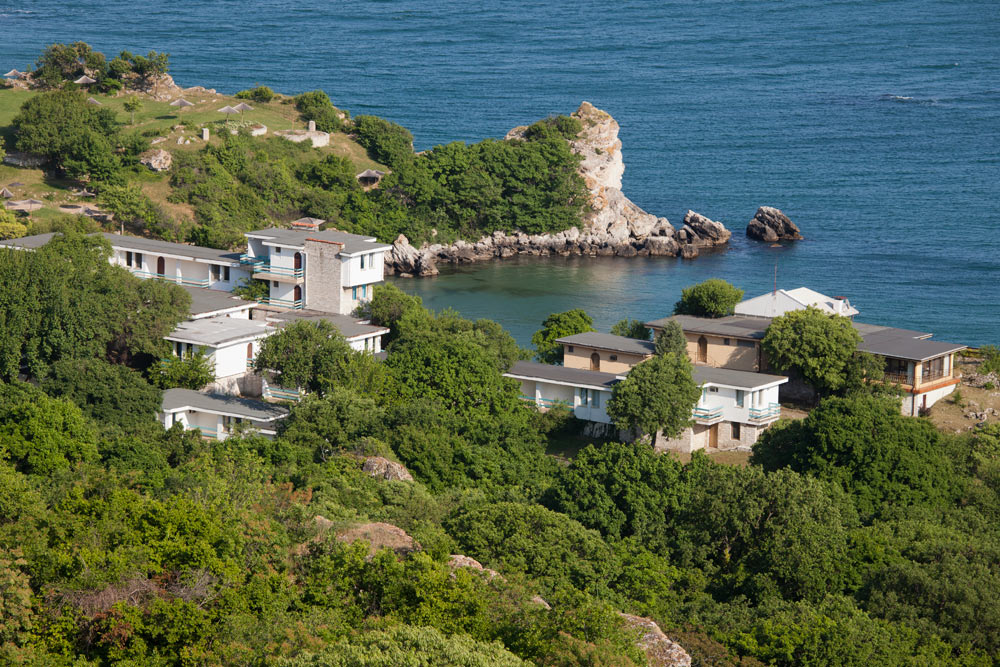
The Rusalka seaside resort

Immediately northwest of the village is the Kavarna Wind Farm, the largest wind power plant in Bulgaria with an installed capacity of 156 MW.

The Rusalka resort is located on the coast of Sveti Nikola.

== Culture ==
=== Religion ===
The Church of St. Nicholas was demolished in 1998, after which a completely new church was built, which was consecrated by Metropolitan John of Varna in 2021.

=== Civil ===
The village meeting is held annually on 1 May.
