= Irechek =

- Village
- Location within Bulgaria
- Coordinates: 43°31′N 28°22′E
- Country: Bulgaria
- Province: Dobrich
- Municipality: Kavarna

Area
  - Total: 12.062 km^{2} (4.657 sq mi)

Population (2007)
  - Total: 26
- Time zone: UTC+2 (EET)
  - Summer (DST): UTC+3 (EEST)

Irechek (Bulgarian: Иречек [ˈirɛt͡ʃɛk]) is a village in Kavarna Municipality, Dobrich Province, northeastern Bulgaria, located about 12 kilometres (7.5 mi) north of Kavarna. It lies to the west of Vranino, south of Vidno and to the northeast of Mogilishte. As of 2007 it had a population of 26 people, covering an area of 12.062 square kilometres (4.657 sq mi) The population is gradually decreasing as younger people move away to the cities.

August 2013 saw the closure of the only shop in the village where bread and small goods were sold. The closest shop is now found in Vidno. The village has a cemetery with graves dating back from the 1900s and is still used today, this is found in the back fields to the South. With only 4 houses in the village and an aging population the number of inhabitants has dropped since 2007 and now stands at no more than 11 people. Irechek also has a problem with wild dogs which are not owned and live in the fields trying to find food, water and shelter. On weekends and bank Holidays Irechek and the surrounding area is a prime hunting ground for small birds. The land around the village is mostly flat and fertile, with agriculture employing most of the inhabitants who produce fruits and vegetables. A small stream runs through the municipality which helps irrigation. Wild pheasants, rabbits, foxes and hawks are found here.
