= Lucifer's Friend =

German rock band

- Origin: Hamburg, West Germany
- Genres: Progressive rock; hard rock; heavy metal; jazz fusion
- Years active: 1970–1982; 2014–2020
- Labels: Vertigo; Janus; Fontana; Repertoire Records; Cherry Red
- Past members: Peter Hesslein; Stephan Eggert; Jogi Wichmann; Joachim "Addi" Rietenbach; Peter Hecht; Herbert Bornhold; Mike Starrs; Dieter Horns; John Lawton
- Website: lucifersfriend.com

Lucifer's Friend was a German rock band, formed in Hamburg in 1970 by guitarist Peter Hesslein, singer John Lawton, bassist Dieter Horns, keyboardist Peter Hecht, and drummer Joachim Reitenbach. The group was an early practitioner of heavy metal and progressive rock. They also incorporated elements of jazz and fusion into their music, especially in their fourth album Banquet of 1974. Beyond heavy metal, the band has been cited as a pioneer of doom metal, helping to define both genres due to the heavy sound and dark oriented lyrics of their debut Lucifer's Friend of 1971, and returning to their roots in 1981 with Mean Machine, although more influenced by speed metal.

== History ==
Vocalist John Lawton's band Stonewall broke up while on tour in West Germany in 1969. While the band returned to Britain, Lawton stayed in Germany, where he met Peter Hesslein, Dieter Horns, Peter Hecht and Joachim Reitenbach, members of a band called The German Bonds. The five joined together to record an album under the name Asterix in 1970, soon changing their name to Lucifer's Friend.

The early albums were released on Vertigo Records in Europe, but in the United States those albums were released on a series of small independent record labels (Billingsgate, Janus, Passport), often a year or more after their release in Europe. Despite airplay in some markets and a cult following, the band's albums were hard to find and commercial success eluded them. The band was finally signed to Elektra Records in 1977: it released three albums with a more commercial pop-oriented sound, but by then interest in the band had waned. Those albums were even less successful than the earlier ones.

Lucifer's Friend was known for changing musical styles and influences on each album. The self-titled 1971 debut had dark lyrics and a stripped-down guitar and organ style that sounded similar to Deep Purple, Uriah Heep, Led Zeppelin and Black Sabbath. That album is sought after by fans of early heavy metal music.

The second album, Where the Groupies Killed the Blues (1972), took an entirely different direction. It was an experimental album of progressive and psychedelic rock, mostly composed by John O'Brien Docker. On the third album, I'm Just a Rock & Roll Singer (1973), they changed direction again, this time in the straightforward rock style popularized by such groups as Grand Funk Railroad, and gritty "life on the road" themes in the lyrics.

Banquet (1974) featured extended, multi-layered jazz fusion compositions and a 30-piece backup band, alternating with shorter tracks reminiscent of Chicago and Traffic. Those first four albums are concept albums of sorts, and along with the self-titled Asterix album, are the most sought after today.

Mind Exploding (1976) established a holding pattern and tried to combine the jazz of Banquet with the garage-rock of Rock & Roll Singer, but was not as well received as the earlier albums. Vocalist John Lawton left in 1976 to join Uriah Heep. He was replaced with Ian Cussick. With him, the band recorded and released the 7" single "Old Man Roller / Writing On The Wall" in June 1977. That same year, he was replaced with Mike Starrs, former singer of Colosseum II. John Lawton returned for the 1981 album Mean Machine. On the two albums without Lawton, the band moved to a more commercial sound, on 1978's Good Time Warrior and 1980s Sneak Me In.

John Lawton's 1980 solo album on RCA, Heartbeat, was a Lucifer's Friend album in everything but name, with the lineup from Sneak Me In performing as backup musicians. Lawton's official return, Mean Machine, went back to heavy metal, in the vein of Rainbow and NWOBHM. The band officially broke up in 1982, but thirteen years later, in 1994, John and Peter Hesslein briefly reformed to release a new CD, Sumo Grip under the name Lucifer's Friend II, with Curt Cress, Andreas Dicke, Jogi Wichmann and Udo Dahmen replacing the classic line-up. After this they broke up once more.

=== Recent years ===
Although John Lawton stated that the band weren't interested in getting back to record or perform live again, in August 2014, he announced on his website that the original lineup would reunite to play some dates in 2015, including Sweden Rock Festival in June, after almost 40 years since their last show together. They released a new compilation album called Awakening, followed by four new tracks. The late Joachim "Addi" Rietenbach was replaced with Stephan Eggert. Original keyboardist Peter Hecht refused to participate in the reunion, so guitarist Peter Hesslein played the keyboard on the new album. Jogi Wichmann (who had played on Sumo Grip) was the live keyboardist for the shows in 2015 and 2016.

Lucifer’s Friend released two further albums, Too Late To Hate in 2016 and Black Moon in 2019. Bassist Dieter Horns died in December 2020, followed by John Lawton in June 2021, effectively ending the band.

The Lucifer's Friend song "Ride in the Sky" is played in the Bulgarian film Love.net, starring Lawton, as a song by a fictional band called Tabloid.

=== Legacy ===
Tim Baker, lead singer of doom metal band Cirith Ungol, cited Lucifer's Friend as an influence on Cirith Ungol's sound in an interview with Metal Forces, stating that "We really wanted to be like [Lucifer's Friend]".

== Members ==
- John Lawton – vocals (1970–1976, 1981–1982, 2014–2020; died 2021)
- Mike Starrs – vocals (1977–1981)
- Peter Hesslein – guitar (1970–1982, 2014–2020)
- Dieter Horns – bass (1970–1982, 2014–2020; died 2020)
- Joachim "Addi" Rietenbach – drums (1970–1974; died 1974)
- Herbert Bornhold – drums (1974–1982)
- Stephan Eggert – drums (2014–2020)
- Peter Hecht – keyboards (1970–1982)
- Jogi Wichmann – keyboards (2014–2020)

== Discography ==
=== Studio albums ===
- Lucifer's Friend (1971)
- Where the Groupies Killed the Blues (1972)
- I'm Just a Rock 'n' Roll Singer (1973)
- Banquet (1974)
- Mind Exploding (1976)
- Good Time Warrior (1978)
- Sneak Me In (1980)
- Mean Machine (1981)
- Sumogrip (1994; as Lucifer's Friend II)
- Too Late To Hate (2016)
- Black Moon (2019)

=== Compilation & live albums ===
- The Devil's Touch (1976) (1970–1976 Compilation)
- Rock Heavies: Lucifer's Friend (1980) (1970–1976 Compilation)
- Awakening (2015) (Compilation + new songs)
- Live @ Sweden Rock 2015 (2016)

=== Side projects and related bands ===
German Bonds (Includes Peter Hecht on keyboards and Dieter Horns on bass)

- Sonata Facile b/w So Mystifying (1965)
- We are Out of Sight b/w Sing Hallelujah (1966)
- Skinny Eleonore b/w Birthday is Today (1969)

Bokaj Retsiem (Includes Peter Hecht on keyboards, Dieter Horns on bass and Joachim Rietenbach on drums)

- Psychedelic Underground (1968)

Hell Preachers Inc. (Includes future Lucifer's Friend members Peter Hecht on keyboards, Dieter Horns on bass and Joachim Rietenbach on drums, guitar played by Rainer Degner, with George Mavros on vocals)

- Supreme Psychedelic Underground (1969)

The Ravers (Same line-up as Bokaj Retsiem and Hell Preachers Inc. Recorded at the same sessions and some of the songs are the same on those records, but with different lyrics and names)

- Bad, Bad World: Ravers Going Underground (1969)

Brother T & Family (Includes future Lucifer's Friend members, except John Lawton)

- Drillin' of the Rock (1970)

Electric Food (singer George Mavros backed by Lucifer's Friend members, without John Lawton)

- Electric Food (Electric Food album, 1970)
- Flash (Electric Food album, 1970)

Asterix

- "Everybody"' (single, lead vocals George Mavros, pre-John Lawton)
- Asterix (album, 1970, includes all future Lucifer's Friend members, plus Toni Cavanagh)

Pink Mice (Includes all original Lucifer's Friend members, except John Lawton)

- In Action (1971)
- In Synthesized Sound (1971)

Hepp, Hahn and Huhn (Includes Peter Hecht on keyboards and Dieter Horns on bass)

- Alive and Goodnight (1971)

Okko Becker (Includes Peter Hesslein on guitars)

- Sitar and Electronics (1971)

Propeller (Includes Peter Hesslein on guitars)

- Let Us Live Together (1971)

Frankie Dymon (Includes Peter Hecht on keyboards)

- Let it Out (1971)

The Rattles (Includes Herbert Bornhold on drums)

- The Witch (1972)

David Frank Selection (Includes Peter Hesslein on guitars)

- Blues & Electronics (1972)

John Lawton (Includes all original Lucifer's Friend members)

- Heartbeat (John Lawton solo album, 1980)
