= Septemvriytsi =

Septemvriytsi may refer to:

- In Bulgaria (written in Cyrillic as Септемврийци):
  - Septemvriytsi, Dobrich Province - a village in the Kavarna municipality, Dobrich Province
  - Septemvriytsi, Montana Province - a village in the Valchedram municipality, Montana Province
  - Septemvriytsi, Vidin Province - a village in the Dimovo Municipality, Vidin Province
