= Poruchik Chunchevo =

- Village
- Location within Bulgaria
- Coordinates: 43°29′15″N 28°28′04″E
- Country: Bulgaria
- Province: Dobrich Province
- Municipality: Kavarna
- Time zone: UTC+2 (EET)
  - Summer (DST): UTC+3 (EEST)

Poruchik Chunchevo is a village in Kavarna Municipality, Dobrich Province, northeastern Bulgaria.
