= Flash (Electric Food album) =

Studio album by Electric Food
- Released: 1970
- Recorded: 1970
- Genre: Heavy metal; hard rock
- Length: 35:25 (LP Release); 74:10 (CD Release)
- Label: Europa Records; Mason Records

Electric Food chronology
Electric Food (1970)	Flash (1970)

Flash is the second and final album by Electric Food. Soon after its release, the core of band formed Asterix and recorded one album: Asterix. Less than a year later Asterix would change their name to Lucifer's Friend. In 2004 Electric Food and Flash were released on one CD by Mason Records. Both Electric Food albums sound very similar to Lucifer's Friend's debut but include strong influences from Led Zeppelin, Uriah Heep, and Spooky Tooth.

== Track listing ==
Side one

1. "All Right Now" (Free cover) - 3:46
2. "Sam's Walk" (Peter Hesslein) - 2:03
3. "Love Me" (Peter Hesslein) - 3:31
4. "People" (Peter Hesslein) - 2:56
5. "Working on the Railroad" (Peter Hesslein) - 3:25
6. "Randall" (Peter Hesslein) - 3:12

Side two

7. "Love Like a Man" (Ten Years After cover) - 3:27
8. "Sam's Talk" (Peter Hesslein) - 1:39
9. "I Can See Somebody" (Peter Hesslein) - 5:51
10. "Andy's Breakdown" (Peter Hesslein) - 2:25
11. "Give Me Love" (Peter Hesslein) - 2:12
12. "Plantation" (Peter Hesslein) - 2:58

Other recordings not included on any Electric Food album

Born to be Wild (Steppenwolf cover) - 3:27

Up Around the Bend (Creedence Clearwater Revival cover) - 2:40

== Personnel (uncredited) ==
- George Mavros – lead vocals
- Peter Hesslein – lead guitars, backing vocals
- Peter Hecht – keyboards
- Dieter Horns – bass
- Joachim "Addy" Rietenbach – drums
