= Fallen Angel (Uriah Heep album) =

- Cover art by Chris Achilleos

Studio album by Uriah Heep
- Released: September 1978
- Recorded: April, July and August 1978
- Studio: Roundhouse (London)
- Genres: Hard rock; AOR
- Length: 39:36
- Label: Bronze
- Producers: Gerry Bron, Ken Hensley

Uriah Heep chronology
Innocent Victim (1977)	Fallen Angel (1978)	Conquest (1980)

Singles from Fallen Angel
- 1. "Love or Nothing" Released: 30 June 1978 (Ger.); 2. "Come Back to Me" Released: 13 October 1978; 3. "One More Night" Released: January 1979 (Ger.)

Professional ratings
Review scores
Source	Rating
AllMusic	2.5/5 stars
Collector's Guide to Heavy Metal	4/10

Fallen Angel is the twelfth studio album by English rock band Uriah Heep, released in September 1978 by Bronze Records in the UK and Chrysalis Records in the US. It is the last album to feature John Lawton on vocals, before his firing in 1979. Fallen Angel only reached No. 186 on the Billboard 200, but in Germany, the band were at the height of their popularity. On this album, the band moved toward an AOR sound, as opposed to the progressive rock of previous albums.

The album was remastered and reissued by Castle Communications in 1997 with four bonus tracks, and again in 2004 in an expanded deluxe edition.

== Artwork ==
The album was originally released in a gatefold sleeve, opening vertically rather than the customary horizontal axis. The lyrics were printed on the LP liner. The artwork was licensed from artist Chris Achilleos. Achilleos's website lists the original artwork as missing. The same artist designed the cover for the Whitesnake album Lovehunter a year later.

== Track listings ==
All tracks are written by Ken Hensley, except where indicated.

Side one
No.	Title	Writer(s)	Length
1.	"Woman of the Night"	Mick Box, John Lawton, Lee Kerslake	4:07
2.	"Falling in Love"		2:59
3.	"One More Night (Last Farewell)"		3:35
4.	"Put Your Lovin' on Me"	Lawton	4:08
5.	"Come Back to Me"	Kerslake, Hensley	4:22

Side two
No.	Title	Writer(s)	Length
6.	"Whad'ya Say"		3:41
7.	"Save It"	Trevor Bolder, Pete McDonald	3:33
8.	"Love or Nothing"		3:02
9.	"I'm Alive"	Lawton	4:18
10.	"Fallen Angel"		4:51

1997 remastered edition bonus tracks
No.	Title	Writer(s)	Length
11.	"Cheater" (B-side to "Come Back to Me")		4:04
12.	"Gimme Love (Struttin')" (outtake originally titled "Struttin'", but renamed "Gimme Love" and used as B-side to the European release of "Love or Nothing")	Box, Bolder, Kerslake, Lawton	3:16
13.	"A Right to Live" (previously unreleased promo B-side)	Lawton	3:37
14.	"Been Hurt" (previously unreleased original version with John Lawton on vocals)		5:05
Total length:			55:38

2004 expanded deluxe edition bonus tracks
No.	Title	Writer(s)	Length
11.	"A Right to Live"	Lawton	3:36
12.	"Cheater"		4:04
13.	"Gimme Love (Struttin')"	Box, Bolder, Kerslake, Lawton	3:17
14.	"Last Farewell" (alternate version of "One More Night")		3:20
15.	"Street Lady" (alternate version of "Woman of the Night")		3:42
16.	"Struttin'" (alternate version of "Gimme Love")	Box, Bolder, Kerslake, Lawton	3:16
17.	"Falling in Love" (alternate live version)		3:08
18.	"Woman of the Night" (alternate live version)	Box, Lawton, Kerslake	3:18
Total length:			67:17

=== US track listing ===
1. "One More Night"
2. "Falling in Love"
3. "Woman of the Night"
4. "I'm Alive"
5. "Come Back to Me"
6. "Whad'ya Say"
7. "Save It"
8. "Love or Nothing"
9. "Put Your Lovin' on Me"
10. "Fallen Angel"

== Personnel ==
Uriah Heep

- Mick Box – guitars
- Ken Hensley – keyboards, synthesizers, slide and acoustic guitars, backing vocals
- Lee Kerslake – drums, Syndrums, backing vocals
- Trevor Bolder – bass guitar
- John Lawton – lead vocals

Additional musician

- Chris Mercer – tenor saxophone on "Save It"

Production

- Gerry Bron, Ken Hensley – producers
- Peter Gallen – engineer
- John Gallen, Colin Bainbridge, Julian Cooper – assistant engineers

== Charts ==
Chart (1978)	Peak position
French Albums (SNEP)	17
German Albums (Offizielle Top 100)	18
Norwegian Albums (VG-lista)	10
US Billboard 200	186
