= Sumogrip =

Studio album by Lucifer's Friend
- Released: 1994
- Recorded: 1993–1994
- Genre: Hard rock; heavy metal
- Length: 61:33
- Label: Castle Records

Lucifer's Friend chronology
Mean Machine (1981)	Sumogrip (1994)

Sumogrip is the ninth and final album by Lucifer's Friend before their reunion in 2014. This album once again displays the wide variety of styles Lucifer's Friend is famous for throughout their previous albums, living up to the "no album is the same" mantra. The band would stay together for a few years after the album's release before breaking up.

== Track listing ==
1. "Get in" (Instrumental) - 0:36
2. "Heartbreaker" - 5:11
3. "One Way Ticket to Hell" - 5:49
4. "Don't Look Back" - 4:46
5. "You Touched Me..." - 4:15
6. "Cadillac" - 4:08
7. "Step by Step" - 4:10
8. "Rebound" - 4:25
9. "Sumogrip" (Instrumental) - 1:14
10. "Sheree" - 4:39
11. "Back in the Track" - 3:57
12. "Banzai" (Instrumental) - 0:33
13. "Any Day Now" - 3:48
14. "Ride the Sky" - 3:43
15. "Free Me" (Uriah Heep cover) - 4:44
16. "Get Out" (Instrumental) - 0:21
17. "You Touched Me with Your Heart" (Bonus Track) - 5:15

== Personnel ==
- John Lawton – lead vocals
- Peter Hesslein – guitar, backing vocals
- Jogi Wichmann – keyboards, drum programming (tracks 5, 11, 17)
- Andreas Dicke – bass
- Curt Cress – drums (tracks 2–4, 7, 8, 10)
- Udo Dahmen – drums (tracks 6, 13–15)
