= Electric Food =

Studio album by Electric Food
- Released: 1970
- Recorded: 1970
- Genre: Heavy metal; hard rock
- Length: 39:25 (LP Release); 74:10 (CD Release)
- Label: Europa

Electric Food chronology
Electric Food (1970)	Flash (1970)

Electric Food is the self-titled album of Electric Food, a studio project that included (uncredited) singer George Mavros with musicians from Lucifer's Friend and released two albums in 1970, the other being Flash. In 2004, Electric Food and Flash were released on one CD by Mason Records. Both Electric Food albums sound very similar to Lucifer's Friend's debut but include strong influences from Led Zeppelin, Uriah Heep, and Spooky Tooth.

The music served as soundtrack to the popular Europa audio plays.

== Track listing ==
Side one

1. "Whole Lotta Love" (Led Zeppelin cover) - 3:24
2. "The Reason Why" (Peter Hesslein, Monro) - 3:18
3. "Hey Down" (Peter Hesslein, Monro) - 4:30
4. "Tavern" (Peter Hesslein, Monro) - 4:03
5. "Going to See My Mother" (Peter Hesslein, Monro) - 1:59
6. "House of the Rising Sun" (Traditional) - 3:54

Side two

7. "Let's Work Together" (Wilbert Harrison cover) - 2:41
8. "Sule Skerry" (Peter Hesslein, Monro) - 4:40
9. "Nosferatu" (Peter Hesslein, Monro) - 4:52
10. "Twelve Months and a Day" (Peter Hesslein, Monro) - 2:38
11. "Icerose" (Peter Hesslein, Monro) - 2:53
12. "I'll Try" (Peter Hesslein, Monro) - 3:13

("Monro" is a pseudonym of George Mavros)

== Performers (uncredited) ==
- George Mavros – lead vocals
- Peter Hesslein – lead guitars, backing vocals
- Peter Hecht – keyboards
- Dieter Horns – bass
- Joachim "Addy" Rietenbach – drums
