= Neykovo =

- Village
- Location within Bulgaria
- Coordinates: 43°36′N 28°25′E
- Country: Bulgaria
- Province: Dobrich Province
- Municipality: Kavarna
- Time zone: UTC+2 (EET)
  - Summer (DST): UTC+3 (EEST)

Neykovo is a village in Kavarna Municipality, Dobrich Province in northeastern Bulgaria.
