= Seltse, Dobrich Province =

Seltse
- Village
- Location in Bulgaria
- Coordinates: 43.455°N 28.290°E
- Country: Bulgaria
- Province: Dobrich Province
- Municipality: Kavarna
- Time zone: UTC+2 (EET)
  - Summer (DST): UTC+3 (EEST)

Seltse is a village in Kavarna Municipality, Dobrich Province, northeastern Bulgaria.
