= Bourchier Cove =

Cove in the South Shetland Islands, Antarctica

Location of Smith Island in the South Shetland Islands.

Topographic map of Smith Island.

Bourchier Cove (Bulgarian: залив Баучър, romanized: zaliv Bourchier, IPA: [ˈzaliv ˈbaot͡ʃɐr]) is the 2.35 km wide cove indenting for 860 m the northwest coast of Smith Island in the South Shetland Islands, Antarctica. Entered between Jireček Point and Villagra Point.

The cove is named after Bourchier Peak in Rila Mountain, southwestern Bulgaria, in connection with the Irish journalist and Bulgarian activist James David Bourchier (1850–1920).

== Location ==
Bourchier Cove is located at 62°57′20″S 62°33′00″W. Bulgarian mapping in 2009.

== Maps ==
- Chart of South Shetland including Coronation Island, &c. from the exploration of the sloop Dove in the years 1821 and 1822 by George Powell Commander of the same. Scale ca. 1:200000. London: Laurie, 1822.
- L.L. Ivanov. Antarctica: Livingston Island and Greenwich, Robert, Snow and Smith Islands. Scale 1:120000 topographic map. Troyan: Manfred Wörner Foundation, 2010. ISBN 978-954-92032-9-5 (First edition 2009. ISBN 978-954-92032-6-4)
- South Shetland Islands: Smith and Low Islands. Scale 1:150000 topographic map No. 13677. British Antarctic Survey, 2009.
- Antarctic Digital Database (ADD). Scale 1:250000 topographic map of Antarctica. Scientific Committee on Antarctic Research (SCAR). Since 1993, regularly upgraded and updated.
- L.L. Ivanov. Antarctica: Livingston Island and Smith Island. Scale 1:100000 topographic map. Manfred Wörner Foundation, 2017. ISBN 978-619-90008-3-0
