= Mike Starrs =

Scottish singer

- Born: Michael Starrs; 10 November 1944 (age 81); Edinburgh, Scotland
- Genres: Progressive rock, pop rock, hard rock, heavy metal
- Occupation: Singer
- Label: Teldec
- Formerly of: Lucifer's Friend

Michael Starrs (born 10 November 1944 in Edinburgh) is a Scottish rock singer best known for his work with Colosseum II and Lucifer's Friend. He left Scotland for London in the late 1960s and worked in various minor bands. Starrs was signed by the record producer Tony Atkins for Marquee Productions and released several unsuccessful singles. He joined Colosseum II in 1975 after being spotted singing in a local pub and featured on their first album, Strange New Flesh in 1976. Starrs' powerful and distinctive singing style, complimented the guitar work of Gary Moore, the keyboards of Don Airey and the rhythm section of Neil Murray and Jon Hiseman and the result was a potential British supergroup in the making.

The album was not a commercial success but the band was already working on the follow-up when Starrs was sacked, as it seemed the record label owner's wife did not appreciate his flamboyant stage performance. Colosseum II went on to produce two further, largely instrumental albums, with a different record label and without Starrs, which also failed to achieve a commercial breakthrough.

Starrs toured Europe and the United States with Colosseum II in 1975–76, and also had a spell with a version of The Animals. Then moving to Hamburg, he subsequently joined Lucifer's Friend, taking over from John Lawton, and featured on two of their albums, Good Time Warrior (1978) and Sneak Me In (1980), after which Lawton took over again. He was also involved in tours and albums with the German bands, Toneband and Duesenberg.

In 2002, he joined up with Lake reformed under Alex Conti, regularly touring and appeared on their 2005 album, The Blast of Silence, and subsequent DVD, taking lead vocals and co-writing one of the tracks. He left the band in 2010.

Starrs' vocal stylings surfaced again on the reissued and expanded Strange New Flesh (2005) which contained unreleased material from the original Colosseum II line up. Mike is currently singing for the Blues/Rock outfit Crossover alongside N.W.O.B.H.M. guitarist Paul Gaskin. They are recording their debut album at this time.
