= ...Where the Groupies Killed the Blues =

Studio album by Lucifer's Friend
- Released: 1972
- Recorded: 1971–1972
- Genre: Heavy metal; progressive rock
- Length: 44:31
- Label: Passport Records in the US; Vertigo Records in Europe
- Producer: Lucifer's Friend, Conny Plank, H. Hildebrandt

Lucifer's Friend chronology
Lucifer's Friend (1971)	...Where the Groupies Killed the Blues (1972)	I'm Just a Rock 'n' Roll Singer (1973)

Professional ratings
Review scores
Source	Rating
Allmusic	2/5 stars

...Where the Groupies Killed the Blues is the second album by progressive rock band Lucifer's Friend, released in 1972. Piano is prominent on most songs, and organ is used only on a few songs such as "Where the Groupies Killed the Blues", whereas on the debut album, Lucifer's Friend (1971), organ and guitars had been the driving force.

In the U.S., the band's U.S. label (Billingsgate Records) did not release this album although Billingsgate did issue the follow-up album, I'm Just a Rock & Roll Singer (1973). The U.S. release of Groupies was delayed three years until the band's new label Passport Records released it.

== Original LP Track listing ==
=== Side one ===
1. "Burning Ships" (Hesslein, Horns, Lawton) – 4:34
2. "Prince of Darkness" (Hesslein) – 5:37
3. "Hobo" (Hesslein, Lawton) – 3:42
4. "Mother" (Hecht) – 7:25

=== Side two ===
1. "Where the Groupies Killed the Blues" (Hesslein) – 5:04
2. "Rose on the Vine" (Hesslein) – 8:19
3. "Summerdream" (Hecht, Hesslein) – 8:56

== Later LP Reissues and CD Track Listing ==
=== Side one ===
1. "Hobo" (Hesslein, Lawton) – 3:42
2. "Rose on the Vine" (Hesslein) – 8:19
3. "Mother" (Hecht) – 7:25

=== Side two ===
1. "Where the Groupies Killed the Blues" (Hesslein) – 5:04
2. "Prince of Darkness" (Hesslein) – 4:48 (guitar solo eliminated on CD releases)
3. "Summerdream" (Hecht, Hesslein) – 8:56
4. "Burning Ships" (Hesslein, Horns, Lawton) – 4:34

== Personnel ==
- John Lawton – lead vocals
- Peter Hesslein – lead guitars, vocals, percussion
- Peter Hecht – keyboards
- Dieter Horns – bass
- Joachim Rietenbach – drums
