= James David Bourchier =

Irish journalist (1850–1920)

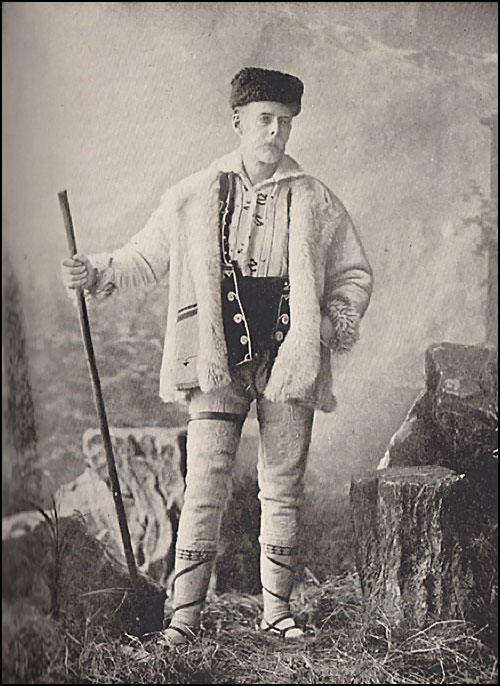
James Bourchier in a Bulgarian national costume

James David Bourchier (18 December 1850 at Baggotstown, near Bruff in County Limerick – 30 December 1920 in Sofia, Kingdom of Bulgaria) was an Irish journalist and political activist. He lived in Sofia from 1892 to 1915. Bourchier was an honourable member of the Sofia Journalists' Society. He acted as an intermediary between the Balkan states in the beginning and at the conclusion of the Balkan Wars of 1912–1913.

== Life ==
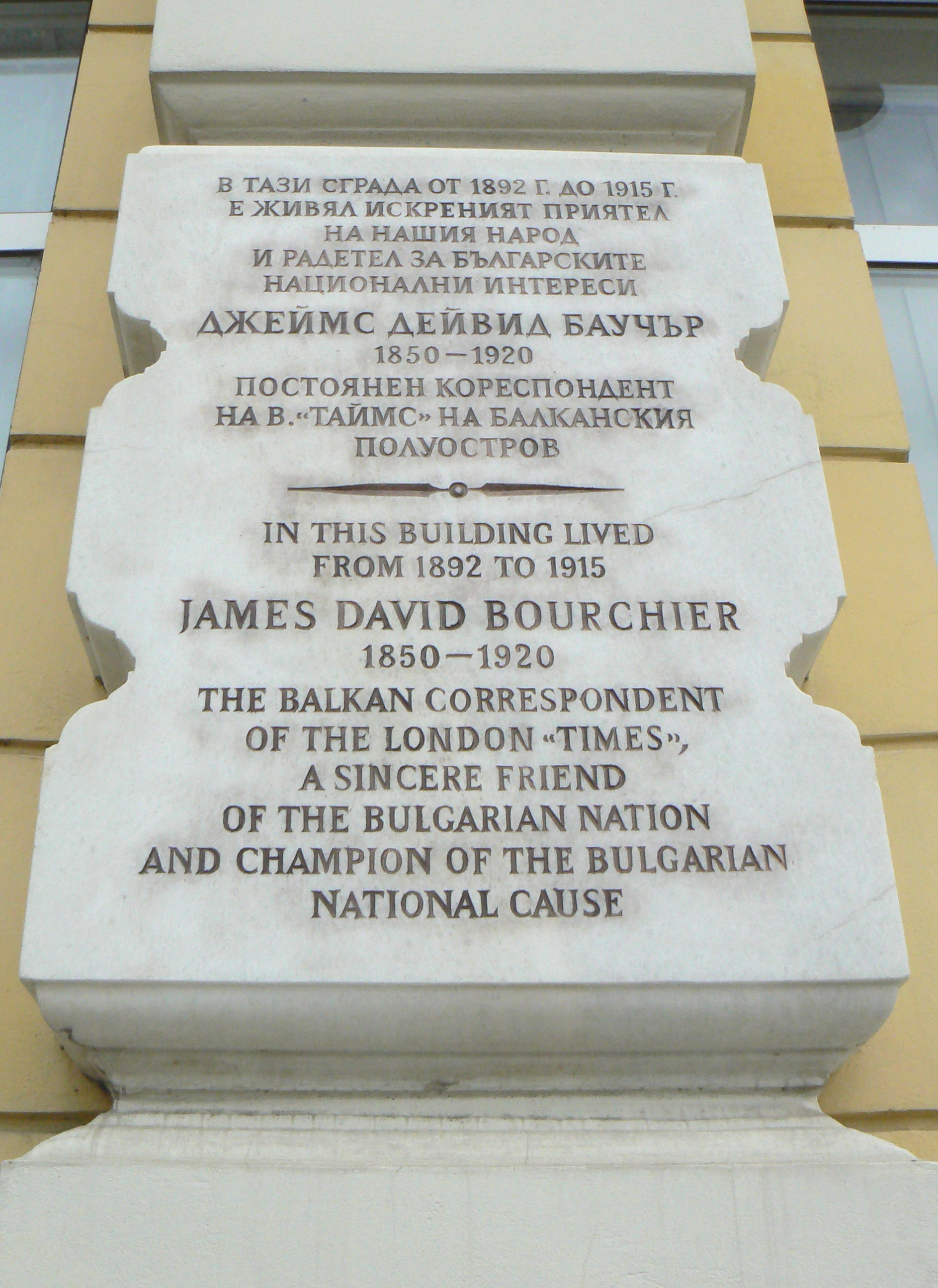
Memorial plaque on the building in the centre of Sofia, where J. Bourchier lived between 1892 and 1915 (42°41.749′N 23°19.636′E)

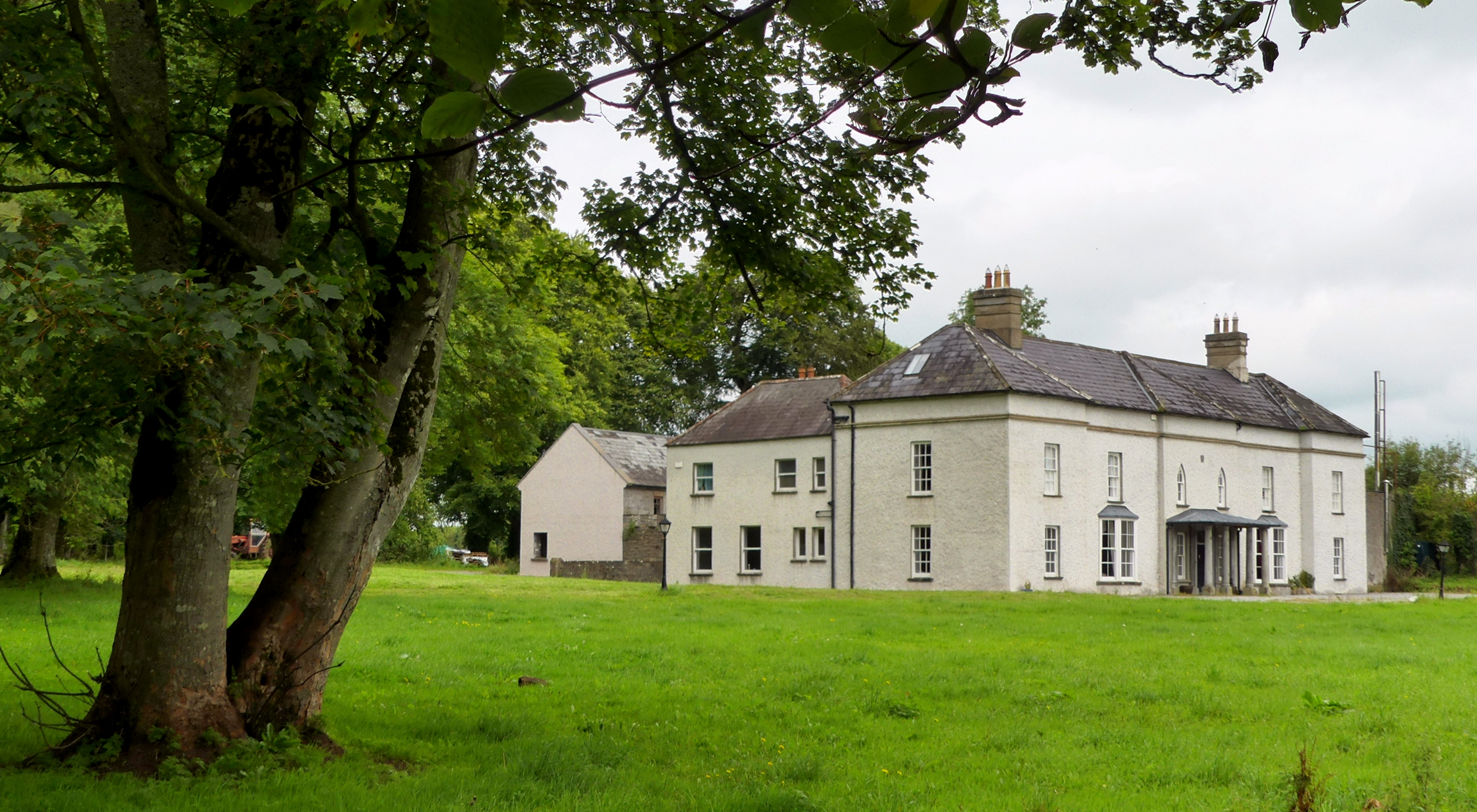
Bourchier's birthplace, Baggotstown House

Bourchier was born in County Limerick and studied at Portora Royal School, Enniskillen and Trinity College Dublin, where he was elected a scholar in classics in 1871.

Deeply engaged in the processes that were taking place on the Balkan peninsula at that time, Bourchier supported the idea that the island of Crete be annexed by Greece. He developed a personal relationship with Eleftherios Venizelos, who recalled Bourchier:

When [he] was… devoting his energies and talent to… Cretan independence, I had the good fortune to come into close personal contact with him and appreciate his remarkable qualities. Chief among them was his ardent love of freedom, equal in strength to that of the great romantics of the early nineteenth century, but translated into the more sober and effective action of a great journalist of the twentieth.

He also witnessed the signing of the treaty between the Kingdom of Greece and the Kingdom of Bulgaria in May 1912 that became a part of the Balkan League.

In his writings he criticised certain clauses of the Bucharest Peace Treaty of 1913, which he deemed unfair to Bulgaria. As a result of the treaty Bulgaria lost the southern part of Dobrudja (which was annexed by the Kingdom of Romania), and part of Macedonia.

Bourchier also expressed his strong support for Bulgaria during the Paris Peace Conference of 1919–1920. The conference produced five treaties, including the Treaty of Neuilly (the peace agreement between the Allies and Bulgaria). Under the terms of the treaty, Bulgaria had to cede part of Western Thrace to Greece and several border areas to Yugoslavia. Southern Dobrudja was confirmed in Romanian possession, reparations were required, and the Bulgarian Army was limited to 20,000 men.

With his numerous publications in the British press, and in his private and social correspondence, Bourchier repeatedly voiced his sympathy towards Bulgaria and its people. According to The Times: "He was a private man, nervous, haunted by growing deafness, probably homosexual, but he became the close confidant of kings and ambassadors in their labyrinthine intrigues." After his death in December 1920, James Bourchier was buried near the Rila Monastery in southwestern Bulgaria.

== Honours ==
Bourchier Peak on Rila Mountain, James Bourchier Boulevard and James Bourchier Metro Station in Sofia, James Bourchier Boulevard in Blagoevgrad and Bourchier Cove on Smith Island in the South Shetland Islands, Antarctica are named after James David Bourchier.

In 1990, the recently established Bulgarian Society for British Studies devoted its first national conference to the 140th anniversary of Bourchier’s birth, in Limerick, and 70th anniversary of his death.

Today James Bourchier Boulevard is a busy street in Sofia with numerous administrative and office buildings on it. Its most notable landmark is probably the Hotel Marinela Sofia. The Faculty of Physics, the Faculty of Mathematics and Informatics, and the Faculty of Chemistry of Sofia University are also located there, as is the office of the Union of Physicists in Bulgaria and the headquarters of the Bulgarian Red Cross. There are also streets named after him in Varna and Blagoevgrad.

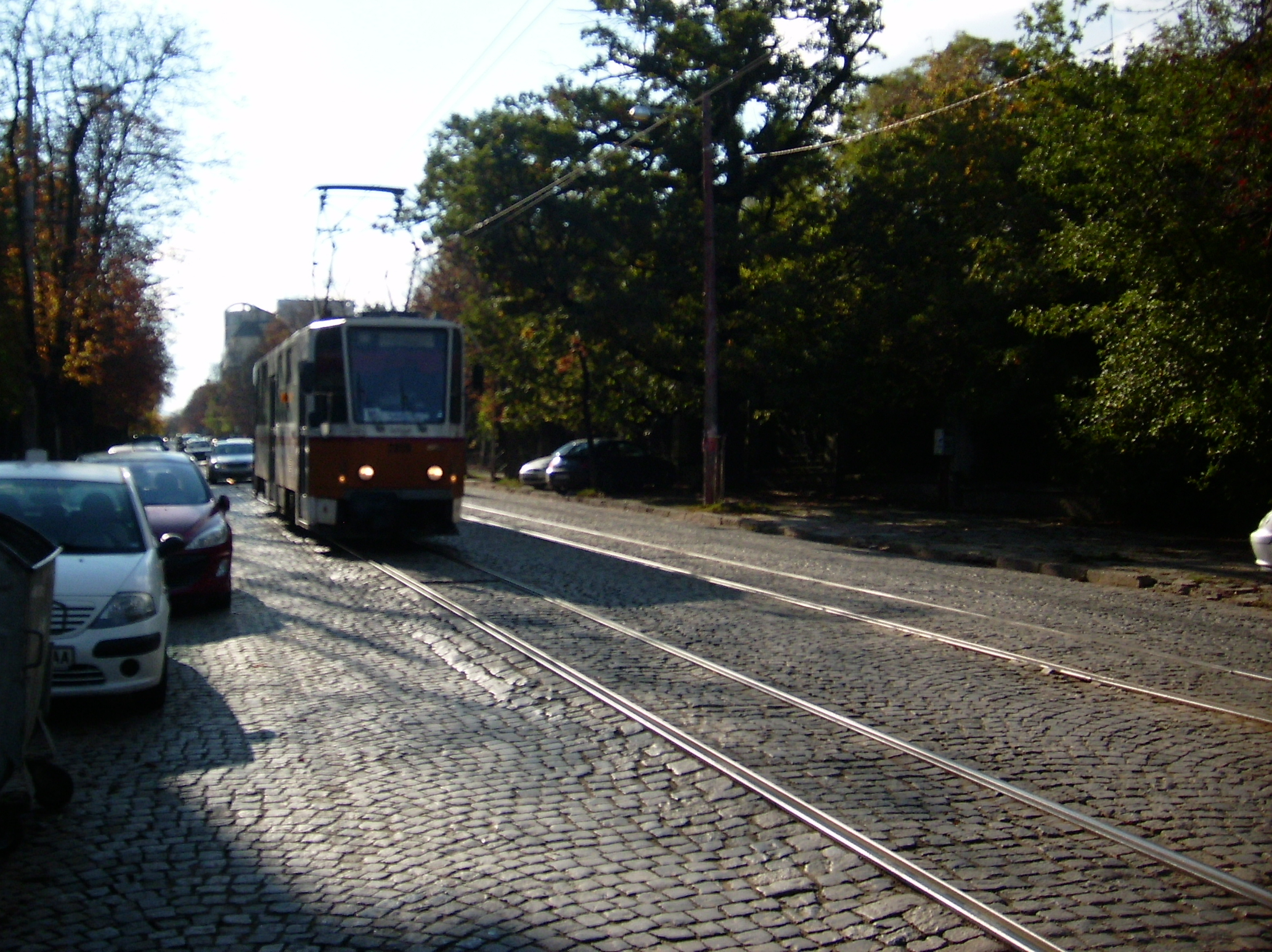
A view of Boulevard James Bourchier in Sofia, Bulgaria (42°40.460′N 23°19.695′E)

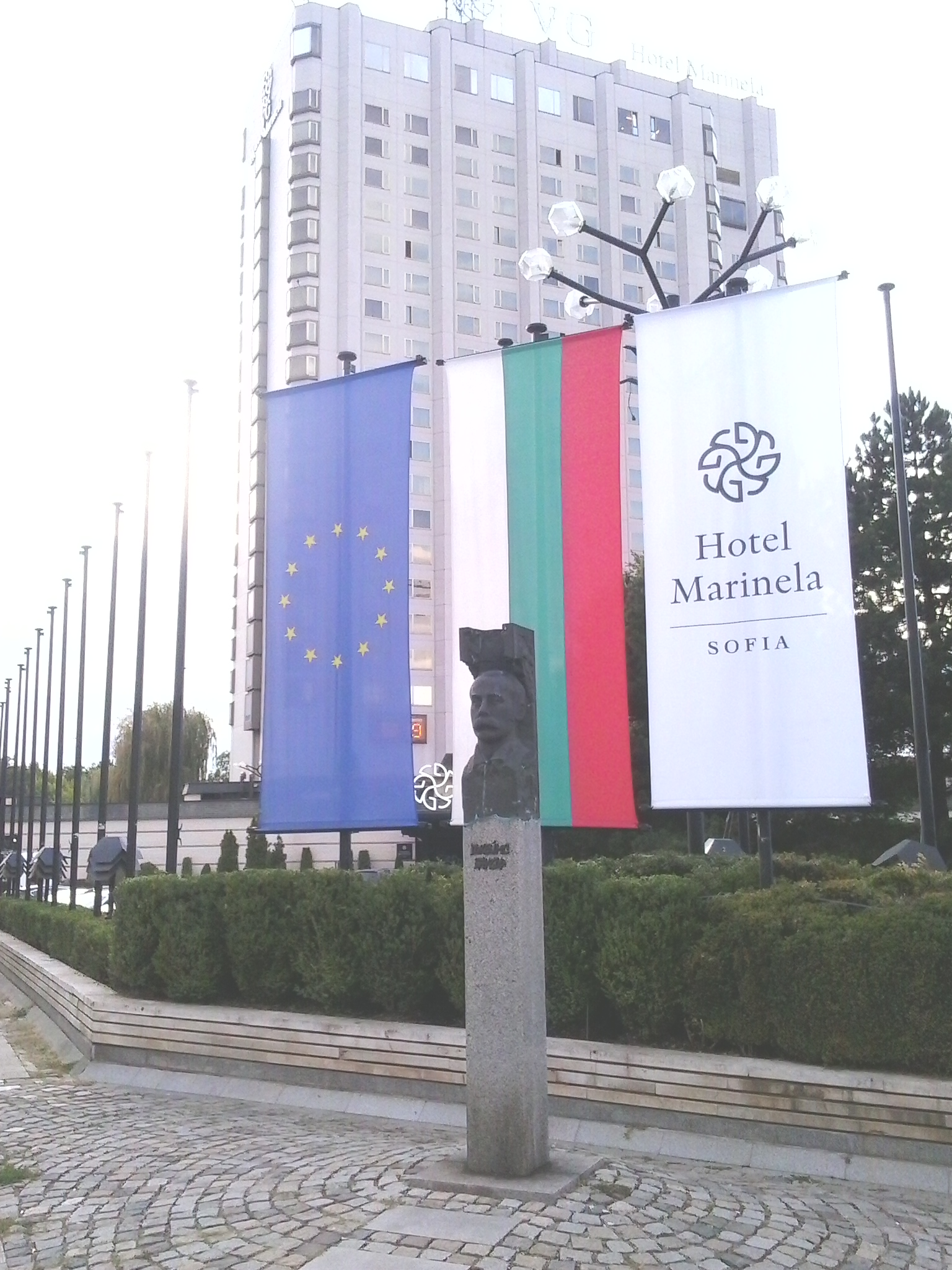
A Monument dedicated to James Bourchier in Sofia, Bulgaria

== Notes ==
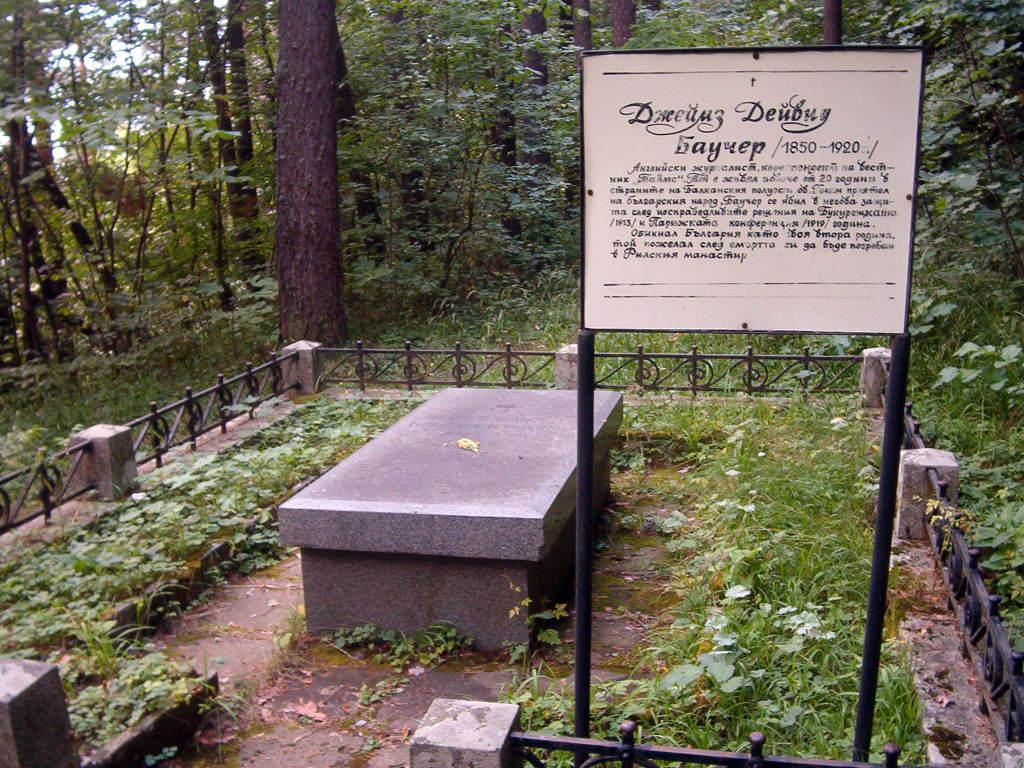
James David Bourchier's Grave near the Rila Monastery

== Bibliography ==
- W. B. Stanford gives an account of James David Bourchier, b. Bruff, Co. Limerick, Ireland, who assisted the Greeks in the insurrection in Crete of 1896; bibl.
- Lady Grogan, Life of J. D. Bourchier (London 1926).
- Foley, Michael (2010). "From Bruff to the Balkans: James David Bourchier". In O'Connor, Maureen (ed.). Back to the Future of Irish Studies: Festschrift for Tadhg Foley. Oxford; Bern; Berlin; Bruxelles etc.: Peter Lang. ISBN 9783034301411 – via Google Books.
- Williams, Harold (June 1922). "J.D. Bourchier". Slavonic Review. 1 (1): 227–228. JSTOR 4201602.
- Giffin, Frederick C. (November 1964). "James David Bourchier". The Historian. 27 (1): 1–20. doi:10.1111/j.1540-6563.1964.tb00271.x. JSTOR 24438075.
- Quinn, James. "Bourchier, James David". Dictionary of Irish Biography.
