= Topola, Dobrich Province =

Topola
- Village
- Location within Bulgaria
- Coordinates: 43°25′N 28°16′E
- Country: Bulgaria
- Province: Dobrich Province
- Municipality: Kavarna
- Time zone: UTC+2 (EET)
  - Summer (DST): UTC+3 (EEST)

Topola (Bulgarian: Топола) is a village in Kavarna Municipality, Dobrich Province, northeastern Bulgaria.

During the Romanian administration of 1913-1940, it was named as Suiuciucul Turcesc.

== Honours ==
Topola Ridge on Davis Coast, Antarctica is named after the village.

1910 Türk Söğütçük [Turkish] At the beginning of the 20th century, Gagauz/Tatar or Nogai settlement. Currently, Turkish/Tatar or Nogai settlement.
