= Vranino =

- Village
- Location within Bulgaria
- Coordinates: 43°31′N 28°18′E
- Country: Bulgaria
- Province: Dobrich Province
- Municipality: Kavarna
- Time zone: UTC+2 (EET)
  - Summer (DST): UTC+3 (EEST)

Vranino is a village in Kavarna Municipality, Dobrich Province, northeastern Bulgaria.
