= I'm Just a Rock 'n' Roll Singer =

Album by Lucifer's Friend

Studio album by Lucifer's Friend
- Released: November 1973
- Recorded: January–February 1973
- Studio: Widrose-Dumont-Time Studios
- Genre: Progressive rock
- Length: 43:45
- Language: English
- Label: Billingsgate Records (in the US); Vertigo Records (in Europe)
- Producer: Horns, Hecht, Hesslein

Lucifer's Friend chronology
Where the Groupies Killed the Blues (1972)	I'm Just a Rock 'n' Roll Singer (1973)	Banquet (1974)

Professional ratings
Review scores
Source	Rating
Allmusic	2.5/5 stars

I'm Just a Rock 'n' Roll Singer is the third album released by progressive rock band Lucifer's Friend in 1973. This album marks the point where they completely turn away from dark lyrics and heavy metal sound.

== Track listing ==
Side one
No.	Title	Writer(s)	Length
1.	"Groovin' Stone"	Peter Hesslein, John Lawton	5:18
2.	"Closed Curtains"	Peter Hecht, Fendt, Lawton	6:00
3.	"Born on the Run"	Dieter Horns, Lawton	3:48
4.	"Blind Freedom"	Hesslein, Lawton	6:24

Side two
No.	Title	Writer(s)	Length
5.	"Rock 'n' Roll Singer"	Hesslein, Lawton	4:15
6.	"Lonely City Days"	Hesslein, Lawton	4:55
7.	"Mary's Breakdown"	Horns, Lawton	5:51
8.	"Song for Louie"	Hesslein, Lawton	7:14

== Personnel ==
- John Lawton – lead vocals
- Peter Hesslein – lead and rhythm guitar, vocals
- Peter Hecht – keyboards
- Dieter Horns – bass, vocals
- Joachim Reitenbach – drums

=== Guest musicians ===
- Herbert Bornhold – percussion
- Herb Geller – soprano saxophone on "Blind Freedom"
- Bob Lanese – trumpet on "Blind Freedom"
