= Belgun, Dobrich Province =

Belgun Белгун
- Village
- Location within Bulgaria
- Coordinates: 43°10′N 28°19′E
- Country: Bulgaria
- Province: Dobrich Province
- Municipality: Kavarna

Area
  - Total: 33.292 km^{2} (12.854 sq mi)
- Elevation: 100 m (330 ft)

Population (2007)
  - Total: 435
- Time zone: UTC+2 (EET)
  - Summer (DST): UTC+3 (EEST)

Belgun (Bulgarian: Белгун, historical name: Duranlar) is a village in Kavarna Municipality, Dobrich Province, northeastern Bulgaria.
