= Septemvriytsi, Dobrich Province =

Septemvriytsi
- Village
- Location in Bulgaria
- Coordinates: 43.608°N 28.364°E
- Country: Bulgaria
- Province: Dobrich Province
- Municipality: Kavarna
- Time zone: UTC+2 (EET)
  - Summer (DST): UTC+3 (EEST)

Septemvriytsi is a village in Kavarna Municipality, Dobrich Province, northeastern Bulgaria.
