= Balgarevo =

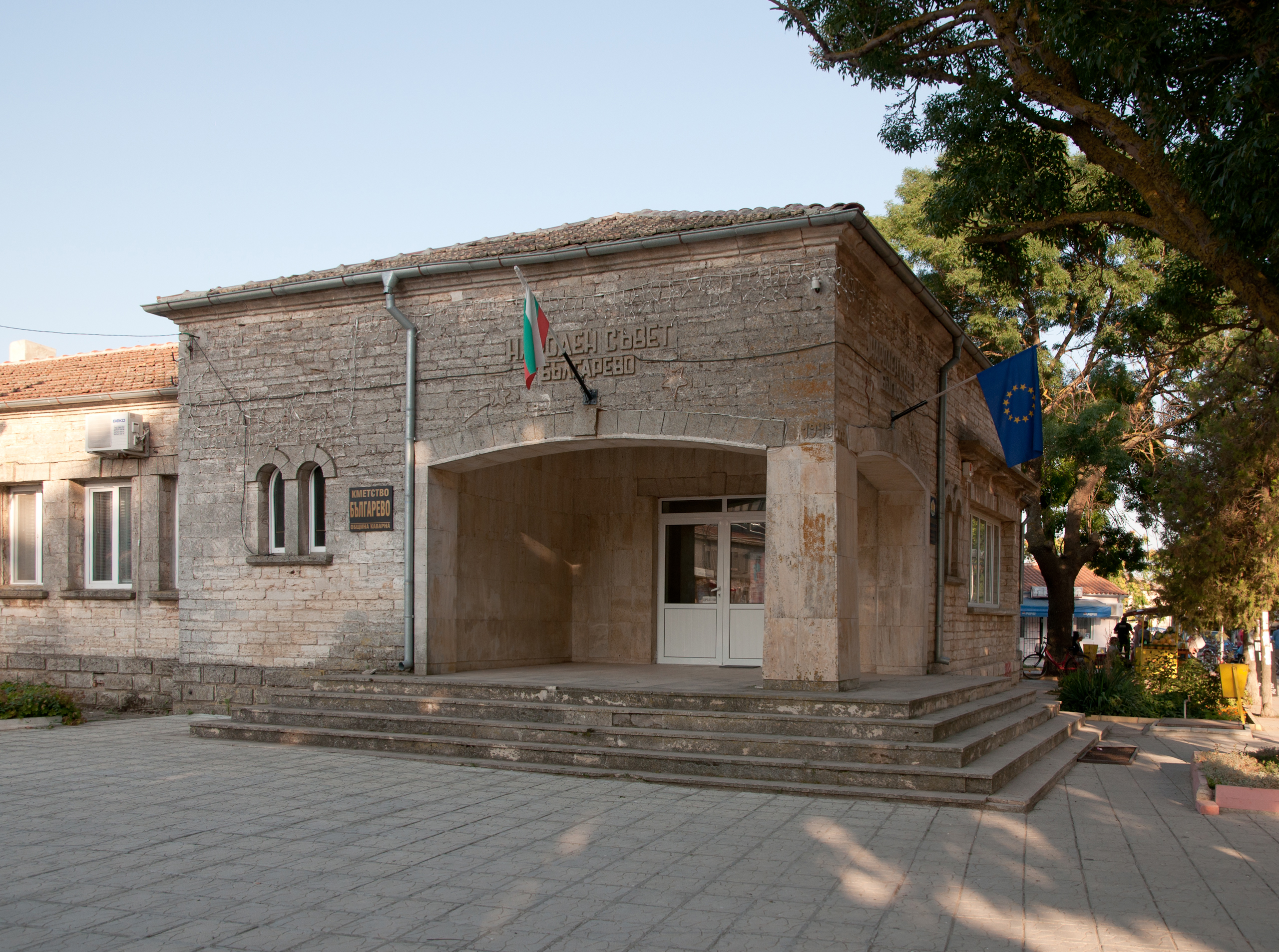
- Balgarevo village hall

- Location of Balgarevo
- Coordinates: 43°24′10″N 028°24′43″E
- Country: Bulgaria
- Province: Dobrich Province
- Municipality: Kavarna

Government
  - Mayor: Georgi Georgiev
- Elevation: 89 m (292 ft)

Population (December 2010)
  - Total: 1,375
- Time zone: UTC+2 (ЕЕТ)
  - Summer (DST): UTC+3 (ЕЕSТ)
- Post code: 9660
- Phone code: +359 5744

Balgarevo is a village in Kavarna Municipality, Dobrich Province, northeastern Bulgaria. As of December 2010, it has a population of 1,375 inhabitants.

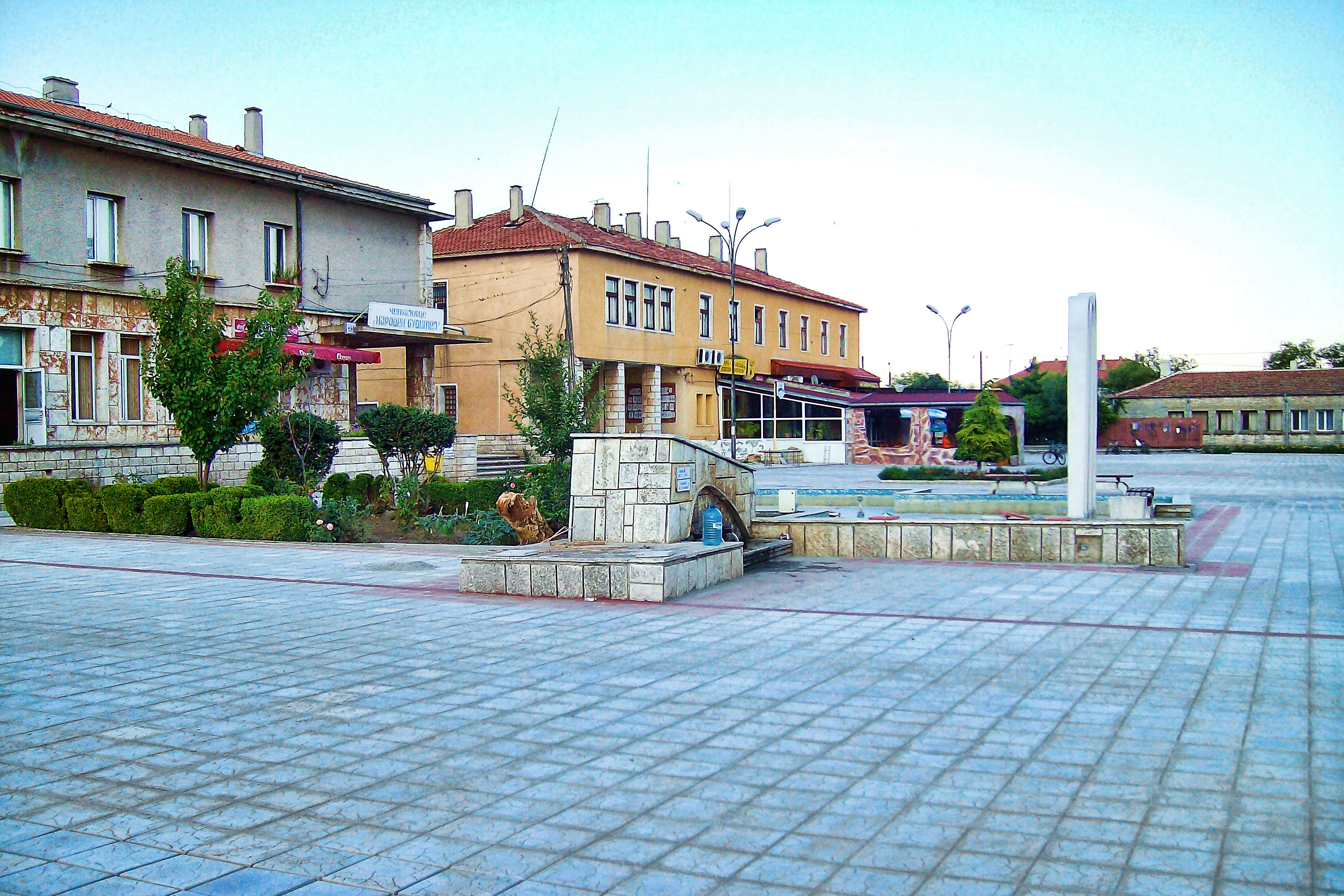
Balgarevo

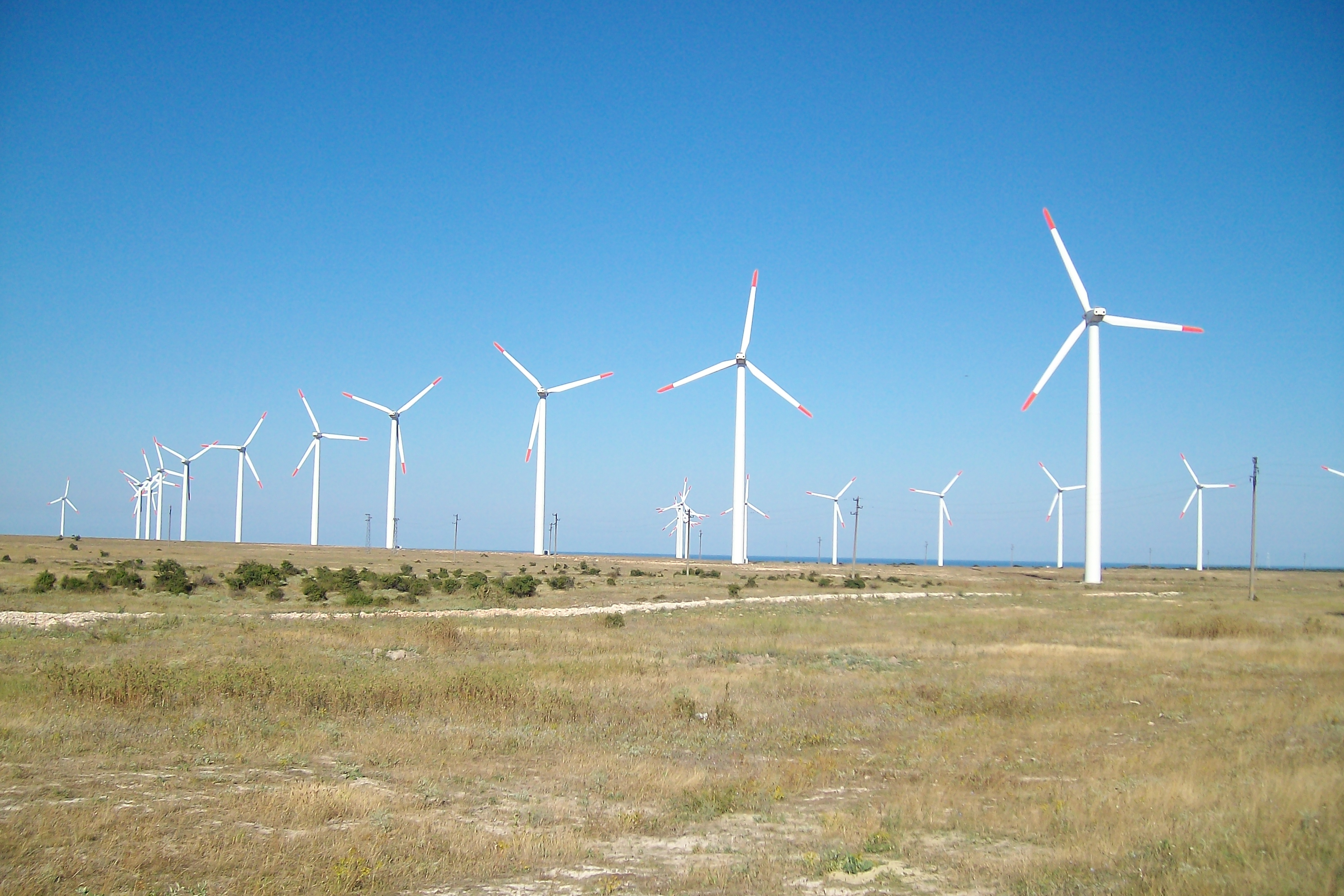
A recently built windpark near cape Kaliakra

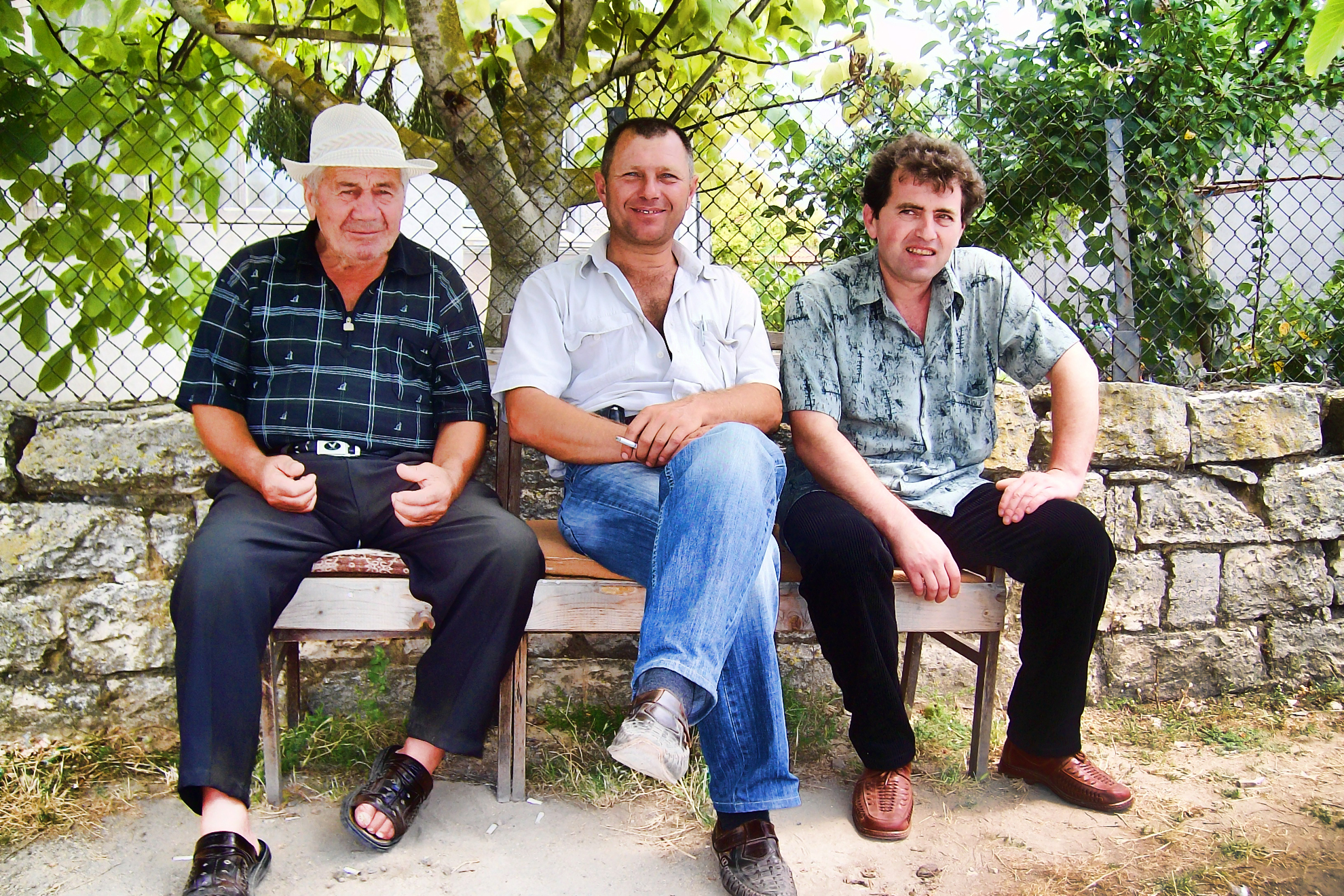
People on a street in Balgarevo

== History ==
According to local sources the village has been established by seven families. Descendants of these families also live in the village nowadays. The settlement has changed its location at least once after it was situated closer to Kaliakra cape, as of the hypothesis is epidemic disease. The old population of Balgarevo belonged to the Gagauz ethnic group. Later in mid-19th century large families from Kotel, Elena and Yambol regions follow the 'emigration flow' from inner Bulgaria to Dobrudja and settled in the village.

The two massive stone-built churches are popular landmarks. One is the so-called 'Greek church' due to the frescoes in Greek language on its walls. The presence of such is reasonable, as before the Liberation the local population failed to acknowledge the Bulgarian Exarchate by following the Ecumenical Patriarch of Constantinople. There is also a certain Greek cultural and social influence that could be noticed even by the given names of the inhabitants. This period finally ended during the 1920s leaving of the Greek colonies which populated the Bulgarian Black Sea coast.

A serious initial resistance was exercised by the local population against the Romanian administration following the enforcement of Treaty of Neuilly-sur-Seine in 1919.

According to Prof. Bozhidar Dimitrov 'the archaeological excavations show that Kaliakra has been settled by Bulgars. Nowadays their descendants live near the cape in the village of Bulgarevo and are part of the Gagauz ethnic group by calling themselves ‘eski bulgar’ - old Bulgarians.'

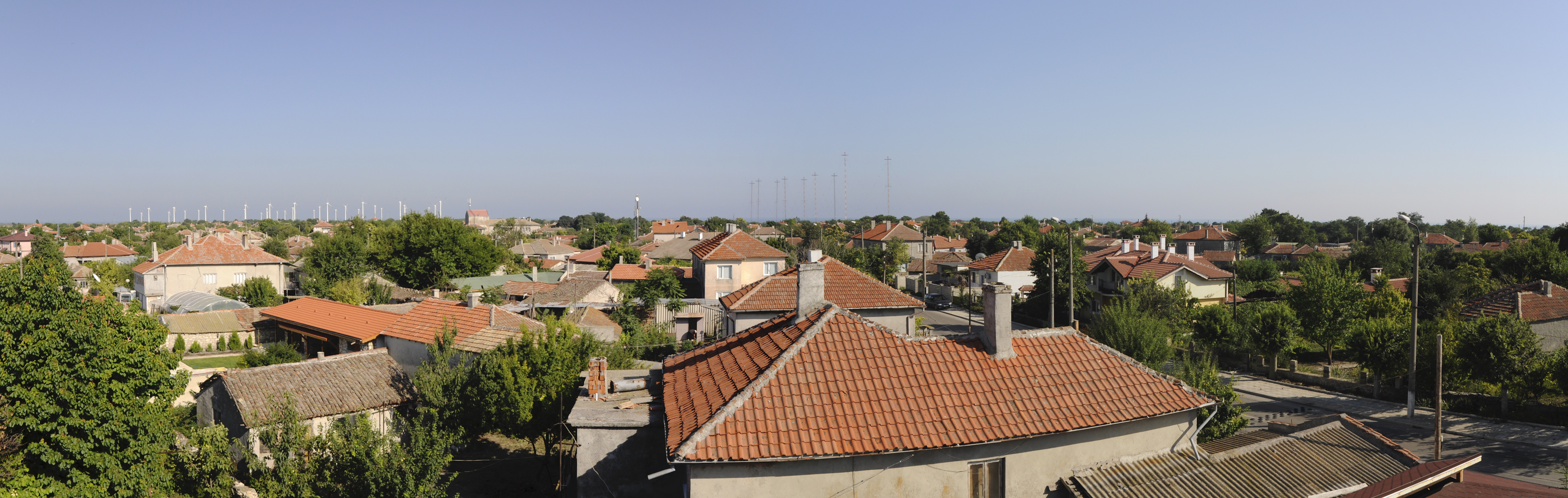

== Religions ==
The population of Balgarevo is entirely Orthodox Christian. There are two churches and a monastery in the village. Saint Michael the Archangel church and Saints Apostles Peter and Paul church. The monastery is dedicated to St. Catherine.

== Economy ==
Tourism, agriculture, fishing and craftsmanship are main sources of income for the local population. A boom in the interest in renewable energy investments was registered by global companies recently. In 2009 the American company AES Geo Energy completed building a wind park consisting of 52 turbines with a total installed power of 156MW.

== Annual Events ==
Archangel Michail's Day – 8 November is a traditional village celebration day.

== Notable people ==
Nikolay Urumov – (b. 1963), actor
