= Lucifer's Friend (album) =

Studio album by Lucifer's Friend
- Released: January 1971
- Recorded: November 1970
- Studios: Tonstudio Maschen & Windrose-Dumont Time Studio
- Genres: Hard rock; heavy metal
- Length: 41:12 (Original LP), 53:02 (with bonus tracks)
- Labels: Germany: Philips (original release); Repertoire (1990 reissue); Vertigo (2010 reissue); US: Billingsgate
- Producer: Herbert Hildebrandt

Lucifer's Friend chronology
Lucifer's Friend (1971)	Where the Groupies Killed the Blues (1972)

Professional ratings
Review scores
Source	Rating
Allmusic	4/5 stars

Lucifer's Friend is the first studio album by the hard rock band Lucifer's Friend, released in 1971.

== Track listing ==
=== Side one ===
1. "Ride the Sky" (Hesslein, Lawton) 2:55
2. "Everybody's Clown" (Hesslein, Docker, Hecht, Horns, Rietenbach) 6:12
3. "Keep Goin'" (Hesslein, Hecht, Horns, Docker) 5:26
4. "Toxic Shadows" (Hesslein, Docker) 7:00

=== Side two ===
1. "Free Baby" (Hesslein, Hecht, Lawton, Rietenbach) 5:28
2. "Baby You're a Liar" (Hesslein, Docker, Hecht, Horns, Rietenbach) 3:55
3. "In the Time of Job When Mammon Was a Yippie" (Hesslein, Hecht, Horns, Docker) 4:04
4. "Lucifer's Friend" (Hesslein, Hecht, Horns, Rietenbach, Hildebrandt-Winhauer) 6:12

=== Bonus tracks from the 1990 re-release ===
1. "Rock 'n' Roll Singer" (Hesslein, Lawton) 4:21
2. "Satyr's Dance" 3:17
3. "Horla" (Rietenbach, Horns, Docker, Hecht, Hesslein) 2:52
4. "Our World Is a Rock 'n' Roll Band" (Becker, Docker) 3:20
5. "Alpenrosen" (Horns, Bornhold, Hecht, Hesslein) 3:53

=== Bonus tracks from the 2010 re-release ===
1. "Horla" (Rietenbach, Horns, Docker, Hecht, Hesslein) 2:53
2. "Lucifer's Friend" (Radio Edit) (Rietenbach, Horns, Hildebrandt-Winhauer, Hecht, Hesslein) 3:43

== Personnel ==
=== Musicians ===
- John Lawton – lead vocals
- Peter Hesslein – lead guitars, vocals, percussion
- Peter Hecht – organ, piano, French horn (on "Ride the Sky")
- Dieter Horns – bass, vocals
- Joachim Rietenbach – drums, percussion

=== Production ===
- Günther Zipelius – engineer
- Henning Ruete, Horst Andritschke – mixing
- Juligan Studio – photography and cover design
- Herbert Hildebrandt-Winhauer – producer
- Lucifer's Friend – co-producer
