= Chelopechene, Dobrich Province =

Chelopechene
- Village
- Location within Bulgaria
- Coordinates: 43°33′00″N 28°18′47″E
- Country: Bulgaria
- Province: Dobrich Province
- Municipality: Kavarna
- Time zone: UTC+2 (EET)
  - Summer (DST): UTC+3 (EEST)

Chelopechene is a village that is located in the Kavarna Municipality of Dobrich Province, in northeastern Bulgaria.
