= Kavarna Municipality =

Kavarna Municipality Община Каварна
- Municipality
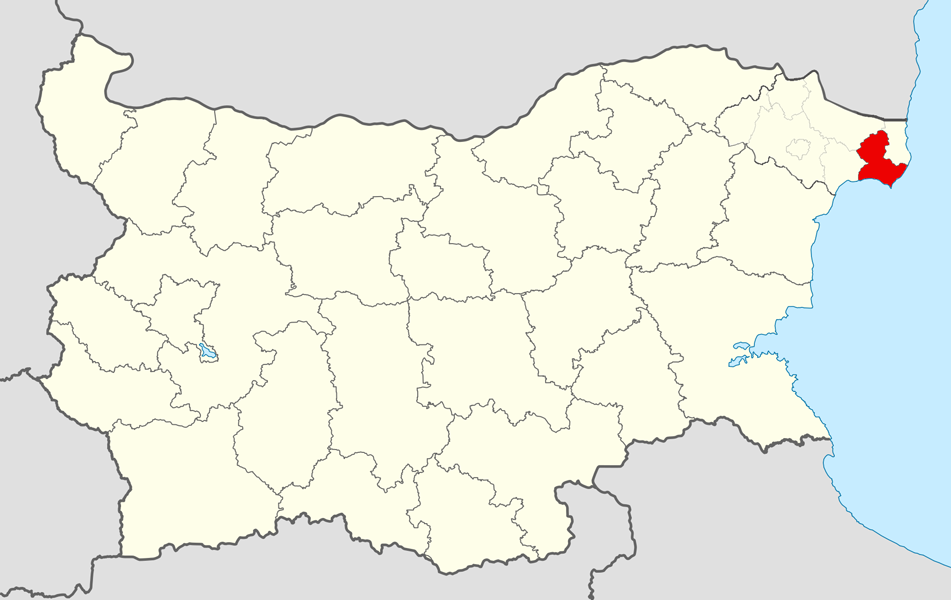
- Kavarna Municipality within Bulgaria and Dobrich Province.
- Coordinates: 43°28′N 28°22′E
- Country: Bulgaria
- Province (Oblast): Dobrich
- Admin. centre (Obshtinski tsentar): Kavarna

Area
  - Total: 481.4 km^{2} (185.9 sq mi)

Population (December 2009)
  - Total: 15,861
  - Density: 32.95/km^{2} (85.33/sq mi)
- Time zone: UTC+2 (EET)
  - Summer (DST): UTC+3 (EEST)

Kavarna Municipality (Bulgarian: Община Каварна) is a municipality (obshtina) in Dobrich Province, Northeastern Bulgaria, located on the Northern Bulgarian Black Sea Coast in Southern Dobruja geographical region. It is named after its administrative centre - the town of Kavarna.

The municipality embraces a territory of 481.4 km^{2} (185.9 sq mi) with a population of 15,861 inhabitants, as of December 2009.

Geographically, the area is best known with the long and narrow headland of Kaliakra. The main road E87 crosses the municipality connecting the port of Varna with the Romanian port of Constanța.

== Settlements ==
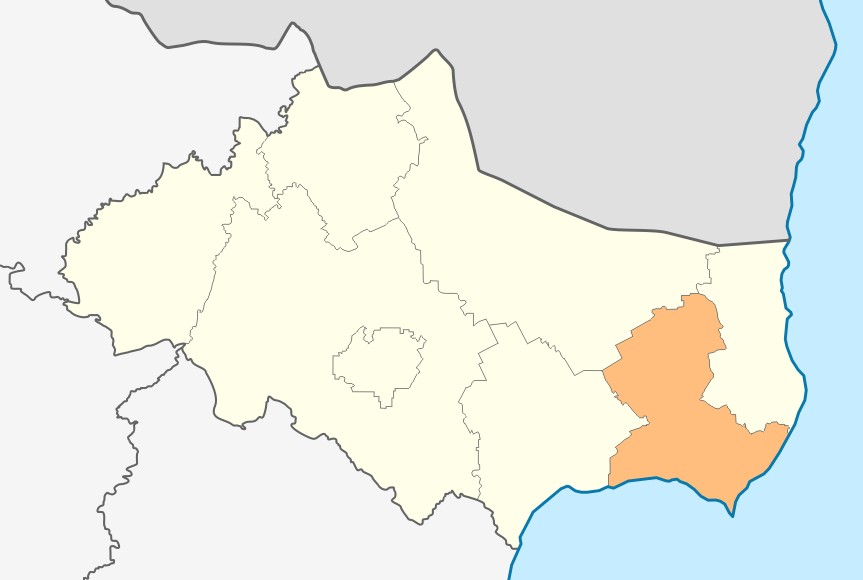
Kavarna Municipality within Dobrich Province

Kavarna Municipality includes the following 21 places (towns are shown in bold):

Town/Village	Cyrillic	Population (December 2009)
**Kavarna**	**Каварна**	11,397
Belgun	Белгун	390
Bilo	Било	48
Bozhurets	Божурец	131
Balgarevo	Българево	1,396
Chelopechene	Челопечене	110
Hadzhi Dimitar	Хаджи Димитър	117
Irechek	Иречек	25
Kamen Bryag	Камен бряг	81
Krupen	Крупен	40
Mogilishte	Могилище	97
Neykovo	Нейково	99
Poruchik Chunchevo	Поручик Чунчево	62
Rakovski	Раковски	300
Sveti Nikola	Свети Никола	239
Seltse	Селце	120
Septemvriytsi	Септемврийци	538
Topola	Топола	156
Travnik	Травник	43
Vidno	Видно	187
Vranino	Вранино	285
Total		15,861

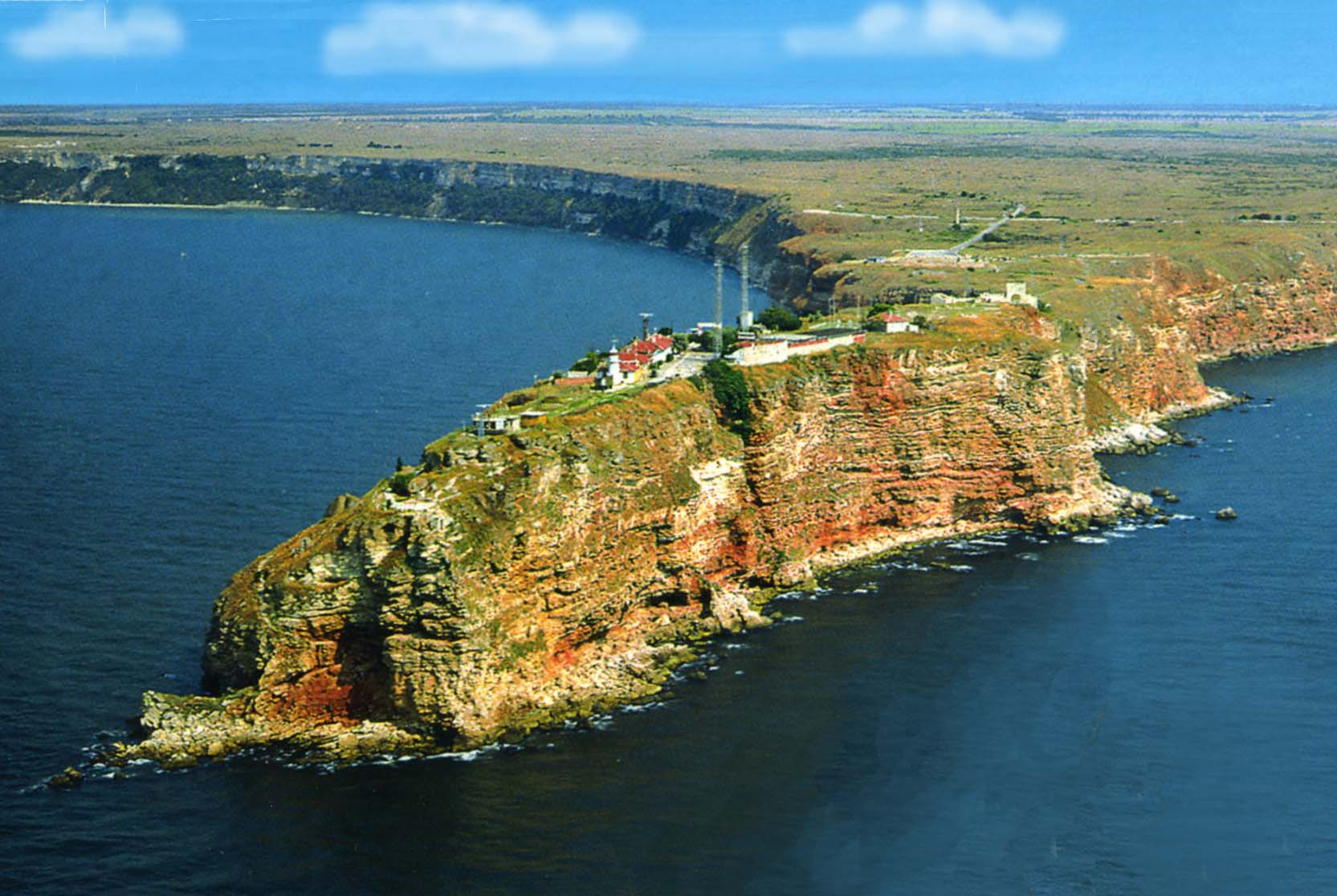
Kaliakra headland

== Demography ==
The following table shows the change of the population during the last four decades.

Kavarna Municipality
Year	1975	1985	1992	2001	2005	2007	2009	2011
Population	19,709	19,096	18,044	16,688	16,317	16,094	15,861	...
Sources: Census 2001, Census 2011, „pop-stat.mashke.org“,

=== Religion ===
According to the latest Bulgarian census of 2011, the religious composition, among those who answered the optional question on religious identification, was the following:

Religious composition of Kavarna Municipality
Orthodox Christianity	70.5%
Catholicism	0.4%
Protestantism	0.2%
Islam	10.5%
No religion	7.7%
Prefer not to answer, others and indefinable	11.7%

== See also ==
- Provinces of Bulgaria
- Municipalities of Bulgaria
- List of cities and towns in Bulgaria
