= Mean Machine (Lucifer's Friend album) =

Studio album by Lucifer's Friend
- Released: 1981
- Recorded: 1981
- Genre: Heavy metal
- Length: 39:40
- Label: Elektra
- Producer: Lucifer's Friend

Lucifer's Friend chronology
| Sneak Me In (1980) | Mean Machine (1981) | Sumogrip (1994) |

Professional ratings
Review scores
| Source | Rating |
|---|---|
| Allmusic | (not rated, no review) link |

Mean Machine is the eighth album by German rock band Lucifer's Friend, released in 1981. It marks a return to heavy metal, coinciding with the regained popularity of the genre with the NWOBHM movement.

== Track listing ==
Side One
| No. | Title | Length |
|---|---|---|
| 1. | "One Way Street to Heartbreak" | 4:35 |
| 2. | "Hey Driver" | 4:11 |
| 3. | "Fire and Rain" | 4:40 |
| 4. | "Mean Machine" | 1:08 |
| 5. | "Cool Hand Killer" | 4:58 |

Side Two
| No. | Title | Length |
|---|---|---|
| 6. | "Action" | 4:00 |
| 7. | "Born to the City" | 4:12 |
| 8. | "One Night Sensation" | 4:44 |
| 9. | "Let Me Down Slow" | 3:37 |
| 10. | "Bye Bye Sadie" | 3:18 |

2011 CD re-release bonus tracks
| No. | Title | Length |
|---|---|---|
| 11. | "Old Man Roller (7 inch A-side)" | 3:38 |
| 12. | "Stardancer (7 inch A-side)" | 4:02 |
| 13. | "1999 (7 inch B-side)" | 4:23 |
| 14. | "Writing on the Wall (7 inch version B-side)" | 4:44 |
| 15. | "Stardancer (12 inch A-side)" | 5:16 |
| 16. | "1999 (12 inch B-side)" | 5:12 |
| 17. | "Moonshine Rider (Live at Rockpalast, Dortmund, Germany on December 6, 1978)" | 5:32 |
| 18. | "Sweet Little Lady (Live at Rockpalast, Dortmund, Germany on December 6, 1978)" | 4:39 |
| 19. | "Fugitive (Live at Rockpalast, Dortmund, Germany on December 6, 1978)" | 7:29 |

== Personnel ==
- John Lawton – lead vocals
- Peter Hesslein – lead guitars, backing vocals
- Peter Hecht – keyboards
- Dieter Horns – bass
- Herbert Bornhold – drums
