= Colosseum II =

British progressive jazz-rock band (1975–1978)

Colosseum II was a British progressive jazz-rock band formed in 1975 by former Colosseum drummer and bandleader Jon Hiseman, which featured guitarist Gary Moore.

== History ==
Following the demise of his previous band, Tempest, Hiseman announced his plan for a new, as yet unnamed, outfit in November 1974, but only Moore was named as a member. Rehearsals were due to begin on 1 January 1975 but a permanent line-up was not finalised until May 1975. Among the musicians considered were singer Graham Bell, keyboardist Duncan Mackay and former Colosseum and Tempest bassist Mark Clarke. The line-up was eventually completed by singer Mike Starrs, keyboardist Don Airey and bassist Neil Murray. The band was oriented toward jazz fusion, much of which was driven by the guitar work of Moore, leading to a much heavier sound than the original Colosseum.

After disappointing sales of their first album, Strange New Flesh, Murray left and Starrs was sacked in July 1976. They continued with a new record label and a new bass player, John Mole, and recorded two further, largely instrumental, but still commercially unsuccessful albums. They also performed on Variations with Andrew Lloyd Webber, which also featured Julian Lloyd Webber on cello, Rod Argent on keyboards and Hiseman's wife, Barbara Thompson, on flute and sax. This album reached number 2 on the UK charts in early 1978.

In August of that year, Moore left to rejoin Thin Lizzy for a fourth spell, and Airey's brother Keith Airey replaced him on guitar. Plans for a fourth album fell through when Don Airey decided to join Rainbow in December 1978.

== Members ==
- Jon Hiseman – drums, percussion (1975–1978; died 2018)
- Gary Moore – guitars, vocals (1975–1978; died 2011)
- Don Airey – keyboards, synthesizers (1975–1978)
- Neil Murray – bass (1975–1976)
- Mike Starrs – vocals (1975–1976)
- John Mole – bass (1976–1978; died 2006)
- Keith Airey – guitars (1978)

== Discography ==
=== Strange New Flesh ===
Released on 19 April 1976 on Bronze Records. Produced by Jon Hiseman.

==== Track listing ====
1. "Dark Side of the Moog" (instrumental) (Airey/Moore) – 6:22
2. "Down to You" (Joni Mitchell, instrumental middle section by Airey) – 9:10
3. "Gemini and Leo" (Moore/Hiseman) – 4:50
4. "Secret Places" (Moore/Hiseman) – 4:00
5. "On Second Thoughts" (Moore) – 7:29
6. "Winds" (Moore/Hiseman) – 10:25

==== Expanded edition ====
Released in 2005 on Castle Music. Re-released in 2012 on Esoteric Recordings minus the last 3 tracks.

Disc 1:

1. "Dark Side of the Moog" (instrumental) (Airey/Moore) – 6:22
2. "Down to You" (Joni Mitchell, instrumental middle section by Airey) – 9:10
3. "Gemini and Leo" (Moore/Hiseman) – 4:50
4. "Secret Places" (Moore/Hiseman) – 4:00
5. "On Second Thoughts" (Moore) – 7:29
6. "Winds" (Moore/Hiseman) – 10:25
7. "Castles" (version 1) (Moore/Hiseman) – 11:09
8. "Gary's Lament" (instrumental) (Moore/Hiseman) – 7:00
9. "Walking in the Park" (Graham Bond) – 7:05

Disc 2:

1. "Night Creeper" (Airey/Moore/Hiseman) – 3:46
2. "The Awakening" (Moore/Hiseman) – 11:43
3. "Siren Song" (Moore/Hiseman) – 6:55
4. "Castles" (version 2) (Moore/Hiseman) – 5:00
5. "The Scorch" (instrumental) (Moore/Hiseman) – 4:39
6. "Rivers" (Moore/Hiseman) – 4:27
7. "Interplanetary Slut" (instrumental) (Moore/Hiseman) – 5:32 (recorded on Electric Savage as "Intergalactic Strut")
8. "Dark Side of the Moog" (live) (Airey/Moore) – 9:00
9. "Siren Song" (live) (Moore/Hiseman) – 11:16
10. "The Awakening" (live) (Moore/Hiseman) – 15:16

Disc 1 tracks 1–6: The original album.
Disc 1 tracks 7–9: Previously unreleased demos recorded August 1975.
Disc 2 tracks 1–4: Previously unreleased demos recorded mid-1976.
Disc 2 tracks 5–7: Previously unreleased demos recorded July 1976.
Disc 2 tracks 8–10: BBC In Concert, recorded June 1976.

==== Personnel ====
- Mike Starrs - vocals
- Gary Moore - guitars, vocals
- Don Airey - Fender Rhodes piano, grand piano, Hammond organ, Minimoog, ARP Odyssey, Solina String Ensemble, Clavinet
- Neil Murray - bass
- Jon Hiseman - drums, percussion
- John Mole - bass (disc 2, tracks 1–10)

=== Electric Savage ===
Released January 1977 on MCA Records. Produced by Jon Hiseman. All tracks are instrumental except track 3 which is sung by Gary Moore.

==== Track listing ====
1. "Put It This Way" (Moore/Hiseman) – 4:55
2. "All Skin & Bone" (Moore/Hiseman) – 3:46
3. "Rivers" (Moore/Hiseman) – 5:50
4. "The Scorch" (Moore/Airey)– 6:02
5. "Lament" (Trad., arranged Moore/Hiseman/Airey/Mole) – 4:40
6. "Desperado" (Moore/Hiseman) – 5:59
7. "Am I" (Airey) – 4:16
8. "Intergalactic Strut" (Airey) – 5:58

==== Personnel ====
- Gary Moore - guitars, vocals (3)
- Don Airey - Fender Rhodes piano, grand piano, Hammond organ, Minimoog, ARP Odyssey, Solina String Ensemble, Clavinet
- John Mole - bass
- Jon Hiseman - drums, percussion, cymbals, gong, bells

=== Wardance ===
Released November 1977 on MCA Records. Produced by Martin Levan and Jon Hiseman. All tracks are instrumental except track 4 which is sung by Gary Moore.

==== Track listing ====
1. "Wardance" (Airey) – 5:56
2. "Major Keys" (Mole/Moore) – 5:10
3. "Put It That Way" (Moore/Hiseman) – 3:37
4. "Castles" (Moore/Hiseman) – 5:40
5. "Fighting Talk" (Moore/Hiseman) – 5:50
6. "The Inquisition" (Moore/Hiseman) – 5:45
7. "Star Maiden" (Mole) / "Mysterioso" (Airey) / "Quasar" (Airey) – 6:15
8. "Last Exit" (Moore/Hiseman) – 3:22

==== Personnel ====
- Gary Moore - guitars, vocals (4)
- Don Airey - Fender Rhodes piano, grand piano, Hammond organ, Minimoog, ARP Odyssey, Solina String Ensemble, Clavinet, tubular bells
- John Mole - bass, piano
- Jon Hiseman - drums, percussion, cymbals, gong

== See also ==
- Variations (Andrew Lloyd Webber album)
- Cricket (musical)
