= John Lawton (singer) =

British singer (1946–2021)

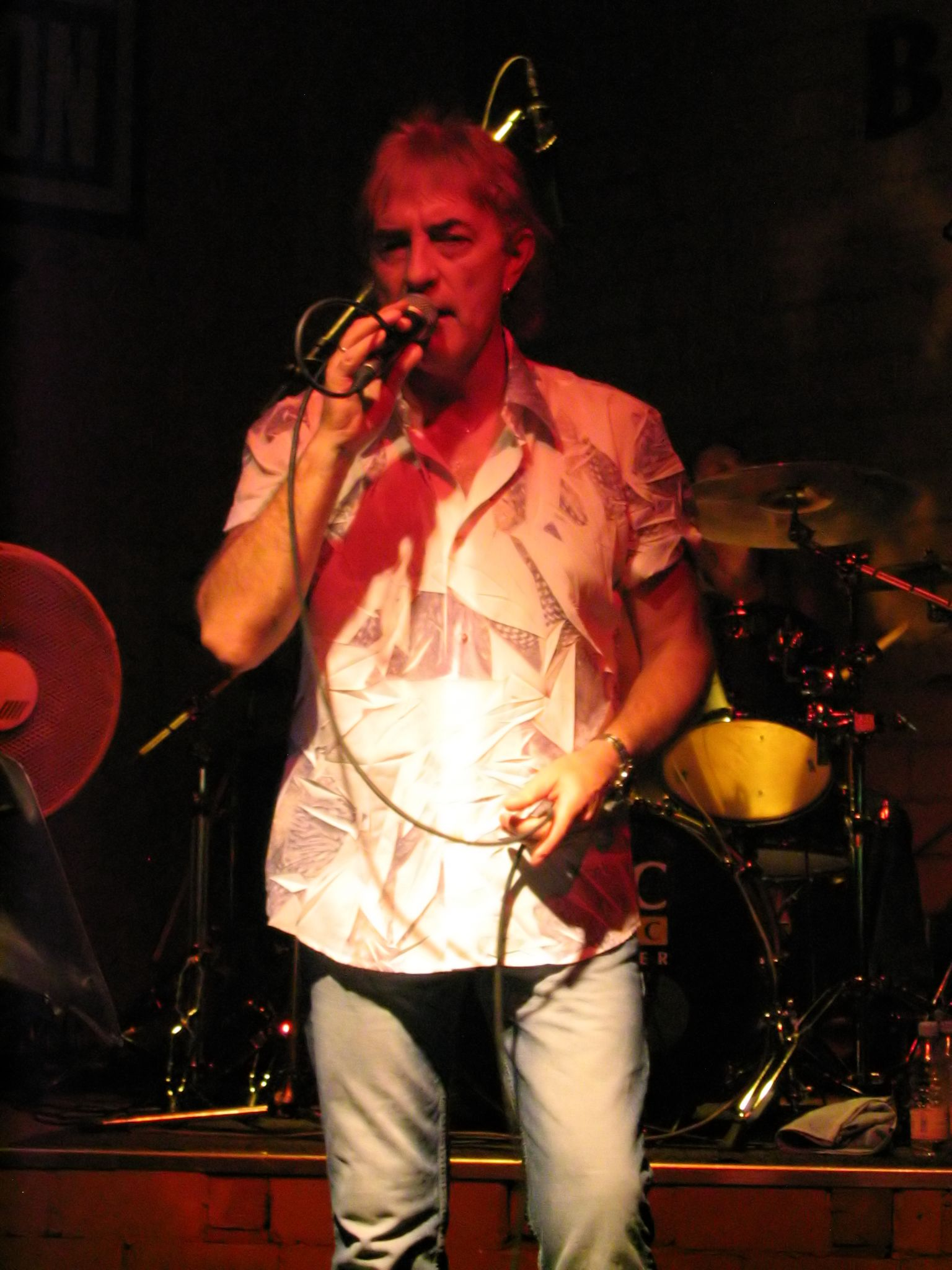
- Lawton performing in 2003

Background information
- Born: 11 July 1946; Halifax, England
- Died: 29 June 2021 (aged 74)
- Genres: Rock and roll; blues; hard rock; progressive rock; heavy metal
- Occupation: Singer
- Years active: 1960s–2021
- Formerly of: Lucifer's Friend, Uriah Heep, Les Humphries Singers, Zar

John Cooper Lawton (11 July 1946 – 29 June 2021) was a British rock and blues vocalist best known for his work with Lucifer's Friend, Uriah Heep and the Les Humphries Singers.

== Biography ==
Lawton began his musical career in North Shields, England, in the early 1960s with The Deans, a group who decided at random that he should be singer. He then moved on to West One and later Stonewall which included John Miles, Vic Malcolm (later of Geordie) and Paul Thompson (later of Roxy Music).

After Stonewall finished their stint at Top Ten Club in Hamburg in 1969, Lawton decided to stay in Germany, after having been offered the job as singer with German rock band Lucifer's Friend (1969–1976 and 1979–1995) with whom he recorded seven studio albums. He also joined the Les Humphries Singers, in the early 1970s (which included the Eurovision Song Contest in 1976).

In 1976 Lawton joined Uriah Heep as their frontman, recording the albums Firefly, Innocent Victim, Fallen Angel and Live in Europe '79, touring Europe and the US until September 1979.

During his longstanding career Lawton has worked with some big names of rock, on various projects, including Roger Glover's "Butterfly Ball" live at the Royal Albert Hall in 1975, featuring David Coverdale, Glenn Hughes, Ian Gillan and Twiggy. He sang on Eddie Hardin's "Wizard's Convention II " with Chris Farlowe, Denny Laine, Paul Jones and Tony Ashton.

Lawton worked with some of the finest record producers, including Tony Clarke (Moody Blues), Jimmy Miller (Rolling Stones), and Harold Faltermeyer (Pet Shop Boys), who produced the titles Lawton sang on the Lenny McDowell Project "Lost Paradise".

Lawton sang with German rock band Rebel, later known as Zar, on three albums, during the late 1980s and 1990s including their hit singles "Line of Fire" and "Eagles Flight", and moved on to Volker Barber's classical project "Excalibur". He also sang on several German commercials, including the "Colgate Gel" TV spots, the "Peter Stuyvesant Travel" spots, the Stuyvesant single "Come Together" and a stint for Harley Davidson Motorbikes.

Lawton formed GunHill, later known as JLB (John Lawton Band), in January 1994, touring the UK and Europe. In 1995 he briefly rejoined Uriah Heep for two weeks, to tour South Africa and Austria with Deep Purple, filling in for their singer Bernie Shaw, who was suffering from voice problems at the time.

Inspired by German top producer Robert Papst and his partner Reinhold Hoffman, Lawton re-recorded one of the Les Humphries Singers' favourites, the 1970s hit "Mama Loo", in January 1998. In August 2000, his solo album Still Paying My Dues to the Blues, produced by Robert Papst, was released in Europe, UK and Scandinavia, by Hypertension Music Hamburg and distributed through EDEL Germany. (The album has been re-released in 2010)

During the fourth Uriah Heep Annual Convention in London, May 2000, plans were made for a one-off concert by the so-called Hensley/Lawton Band. Lawton was joined by former Heep keyboardist Ken Hensley, for the first time 21 years after Lawton's departure from Uriah Heep in 1979. With them were Paul Newton (their original bassist), and two members of Lawton's band – Reuben Kane on lead guitar and Justin Shefford on drums. They played a collection of old Heep classics and some of Hensley & Lawton's solo songs, and the concert was recorded for a CD release called The Return.

In 2001, Lawton teamed up with Ken Hensley to form the Hensley Lawton Band. After an extensive tour of Europe during spring and summer of 2001 culminating with a concert on 12 May in Hamburg, Germany, featuring a full orchestra and a new rendition of Heep's old classic "Salisbury", both Ken and John returned to their respective solo careers.

On 7 December 2001, both John Lawton and Ken Hensley appeared on stage with Uriah Heep during the annual Magician's Birthday Party at the Shepherd's Bush Empire in London. This concert was recorded and released as a CD/DVD.

The John Lawton Band – "JLB" was taken on by Classic Rock Productions in 2001 to record the acoustic CD Steppin' It Up, which features John & Steve Dunning. One More Night Live at the Mean Fiddler, CD & DVD, was recorded in 2002, which was followed in 2003 by JLB's Sting in the Tale CD, an original studio rock album. Later that year followed another Live CD & DVD Shakin' The Tale. JLB had been touring extensively with their last gig in Hamburg, September 2004, when Lawton decided to take an indefinite break.

In May 2006 Lawton joined forces with Dutch guitarist Jan Dumée (ex-Focus) to form the On The Rocks project. On The Rocks – "OTR" featured Brazilian musicians Ney Conceição on bass, Xande Figueiredo on drums, and Marvio Ciribelli on keyboards. Lawton and Dumée wrote and recorded the tracks for the debut album Mamonama, released in October 2008.

In September 2008 John Lawton appeared on stage at the Heepvention 2008 in Spain, with former Uriah Heep members Ken Hensley, Lee Kerslake and Paul Newton, together with Jan Dumee from the OTR project on guitar.

In December 2008 John entered the world of television by presenting the Bulgarian travel documentary series "John Lawton presents" which also includes music from the Mamonama album. Made by the Bulgarian TV company "Skat", the films feature interesting historical landmarks of Bulgarian towns and cities, traditional festivities and interviews with the city mayors and local people. So far the series consists of 19 documentaries, including the municipalities of Karnobat, Sozopol, Tsarevo, Primorsko, Burgas, Smolyan, Pamporovo, Varna, Malko Tarnovo, Velingrad, Shumen, Popovo winter, Popovo spring, Chepelare, Lovech, Kavarna, Stara Zagora, Nedelino.

In 2009 John again joined Ken Hensley, Lee Kerslake and Paul Newton to appear at Heepvention 2009 in Salo, Finland with a Finnish guitarist completing the line-up.

In March 2010, John made his acting debut in the motion picture Love.net, filmed and produced by Bulgarian film company Miramar Film. Part of John's scenes were shot at Liscombe Park, UK, featuring a guest appearance by Uriah Heep guitarist Mick Box, with the remainder filmed in Sofia. He also recorded the movie's soundtrack song – Tonight. The film was premiered in Sofia on 26 March 2011.

In November 2011, Lawton teamed up with Bulgarian band Diana Express to record the album "The Power of Mind" which was composed by Dr. Milen Vrabevski. The album was released in 2012.

Lawton unexpectedly died of an aneurysm on 29 June 2021, at the age of 74.

On 19 March 2022 his cremated ashes were scattered on Kamen Bryag, Bulgaria. On 1 July 2022 a monument to the musician was opened in the "Ogancheto" area of Kamen Bryag, where for years he performed the emblematic song "July morning" during the ritual welcome of the first morning of July. He was survived by his German wife Iris and their children.

== Discography ==
=== With Asterix ===
(pre-Lucifer's Friend)

- Asterix – 1970

=== With Lucifer's Friend ===
- Lucifer's Friend – 1970
- Where the Groupies Killed the Blues – 1972
- I'm Just a Rock 'n' Roll Singer – 1973
- Banquet – 1974
- Mind Exploding – 1975
- Mean Machine – 1981
- Sumogrip – 1994
- Awakening – 2015
- Too Late To Hate – 2016
- Black Moon – 2019

=== With the Les Humphries Singers ===
- We'll Fly You To The Promised Land – 1971
- We Are Goin' Down Jordan – 1971
- Singing Detonation – 1971
- Old Man Moses – 1971
- Mexico – 1972
- Sound '73 – 1973
- Mama Loo (= La Onu Cantante) – 1973
- Live in Europe – 1973
- Carnival – 1973
- Sound '73/II – 1973
- The World Of – 1973
- Kansas City – 1974
- Sound '74 – 1974
- One of These Days – 1974
- Rock 'n Roll Party – 1974
- Amazing Grace & Gospeltrain – 1975
- Party on the Rocks – 1975

=== With Uriah Heep ===
- Firefly – 1977
- Innocent Victim – 1977
- Fallen Angel – 1978
- Live in Europe – (recorded 1979, released 1986)
- Ten Miles High – (A demo session recorded in 1979 with John Lawton. Some songs were later released on other albums, otherwise officially unreleased)
- The Magician's Birthday Party – (live, recorded 2001, released 2002)
- Magic Night – (live – recorded 2003, released 2004)

=== Solo ===
- Heartbeat (also released as HardBeat; 1980)
- Still Payin' My Dues... (2000)
- Heartbeat (Expanded) (Red Steel 2000)
- Heepsteria! (Several solo, Gunhill & JLB contributions) (Red Steel 2000)

=== With Rebel ===
- Stargazer – 1982
- Rebel/Zar (Remastered 2 on 1) (Red Steel 2001)

=== With Zar ===
- Live Your Life Forever – 1990
- Rebel/Zar (Remastered 2 on 1) (Red Steel 2001)

=== With Gunhill ===
- One Over the Eight – 1995
- Night Heat – 1997
- Live in Germany '99 – 1999

=== With the Hensley Lawton Band ===
- The Return (Live at Heepvention 2000) – 2000

=== With the Lawton Dunning Project ===
- Steppin' It Up – 2002
- One More Night (Live) – 2002

=== With the John Lawton Band ===
- Sting in the Tale – 2003
- Shakin' the Tale (Live) – 2004

=== With Chris Catena ===
- Freak Out! (Lawton features in the song "It's a long way to go" – 2003

=== With OTR – On The Rocks ===
- Mamonama – 2008

=== With Intelligent Music Project ===
- The Power of Mind (with Maxim Goranov Band; 2012)
- My Kind of Lovin' (2014)

=== Celebrating The Life Of John Lawton ===
- 33 songs which covers John singing from 1971 to 2014' - 2023
