= The Lansdowne Tapes =

Compilation album by Uriah Heep
- Released: 1993 (UK); 1994 (US)
- Recorded: 1969–1971
- Studio: Lansdowne Studios, London, UK
- Genre: Progressive rock, hard rock
- Length: 77:22
- Label: Red Steel Music (United Kingdom); Viceroy Music (US) RPM Records
- Producer: Gerry Bron, Robert M. Corich

Uriah Heep compilation chronology
The Very Best of Uriah Heep (1993)	The Lansdowne Tapes (1993)	Lady in Black (1994)

UK Red Steel cover and US Viceroy edition cover

Professional ratings
Review scores
Source	Rating
AllMusic	3/5 stars
Collector's Guide to Heavy Metal	3/10

The Lansdowne Tapes is a compilation album by the British rock band Uriah Heep and released in 1993. The recordings featured on the album date from the time before the change of name to Uriah Heep and during the early sessions that culminated in material eventually used on the band’s debut album.

== Recordings ==
About half of the recordings belong to a band called Spice, which featured Mick Box, David Garrick — who later changed his name to David Byron — Paul Newton and Alex Napier; they were signed to Gerry Bron's company Hit Record Productions on 1 August 1969. These early recordings feature tracks laid down by Spice at the Lansdowne Studios from July to December 1969, many of which formed part of Spice's live set at the time. Originally intended for an album release, some of the songs were shelved when Ken Hensley became a member of the band in February 1970. His influence gave them a distinctive sound which was marked with a name change to Uriah Heep, in time for their first album ...Very 'Eavy ...Very 'Umble scheduled for May 1970 release.

The rest of the album features material taped by the embryonic Uriah Heep line-ups. It includes several takes of old favourites and previously unreleased tracks that were recorded for the first three albums, all taped during 1969-1971.

The songs were remixed from the original 8-track tapes at Lansdowne Studios.

== Track listing ==
No.	Title	Writer(s)	Formation	Length
1.	"Born in a Trunk"	Mick Box, David Byron	Spice	3:47
2.	"Simon the Bullet Freak"	Ken Hensley	Uriah Heep 2	3:29
3.	"Here Am I"	Hensley	Uriah Heep 2	8:14
4.	"Magic Lantern"	Box, Byron	Spice	8:33
5.	"Why" (extended version)	Box, Byron, Hensley, Paul Newton	Uriah Heep 3	11:18
6.	"Astranaza"	Box, Byron	Spice	4:47
7.	"What's Within My Heart"	Hensley	Uriah Heep 2	5:26
8.	"What Should Be Done"	Hensley	Uriah Heep 3	4:28
9.	"Lucy Blues"	Box, Byron	Uriah Heep 1	5:11
10.	"I Want You Babe (Behind the Green Shed Blues)"	Box, Byron	Spice	5:43
11.	"Celebrate" (Three Dog Night cover)	Gary Bonner, Alan Gordon	Spice	4:26
12.	"Schoolgirl"	Box, Byron	Spice	3:26
13.	"Born in a Trunk" (instrumental version)	Box, Byron	Spice	4:02
14.	"Look at Yourself"	Hensley	Uriah Heep 3	3:21
15.	"Dreammare"	Newton	Uriah Heep 1	1:11

== Formations ==
- SPICE : Mick Box (guitars), David Byron (vocals), Paul Newton (bass), Alex Napier (drums), Colin Wood (keyboards)
- URIAH HEEP 1: Mick Box (guitars), David Byron (vocals), Paul Newton (bass), Nigel Olsson (drums), Ken Hensley (keyboards)
- URIAH HEEP 2: Mick Box (guitars), David Byron (vocals), Paul Newton (bass), Keith Baker (drums), Ken Hensley (keyboards)
- URIAH HEEP 3: Mick Box (guitars), David Byron (vocals), Paul Newton (bass), Iain Clark (drums), Ken Hensley (keyboards)

== Production ==
- Gerry Bron – original recordings producer
- Peter Gallen – engineer
- Track recovery, mixing & post production – Robert M. Corich
- Robert M. Corich – compilation producer
