= Spice (British band) =

British rock and blues band

- Origin: London, England
- Genres: Pop rock, rhythm and blues
- Years active: 1967–1970
- Label: United Artists
- Spinoffs: Uriah Heep
- Past members: Mick Box; David Byron; Paul Newton; Alex Napier; Colin Wood; Ken Hensley; Nigel Pegrum; Barry Blue; Alf Raynor

Spice were a British pop rock and rhythm and blues band featuring David Byron (vocals), Mick Box (guitar), Paul Newton (bass guitar), Alex Napier (drums) and Colin Wood (keyboards). (Napier was a replacement for drummer Nigel Pegrum; Pegrum would later join the folk rock band Steeleye Span).

In late 1969, organist Ken Hensley, formerly of The Gods and Toe Fat joined. The band's last concert was on 21 February 1970 at St Mary's College in Twickenham, supporting Deep Purple – the band changed its name to Uriah Heep shortly after. The first concert as Uriah Heep was on 20 March at the Technical College in Salisbury. Plans had been made to change the band name to Uriah Heep as early as December 1969, though.

== Discography ==
Spice released one single, "What About The Music" (b/w "In Love") in 1968, eventually transforming into Uriah Heep during the recording of their first full-length album. Songs recorded under the Spice name and line-up have surfaced on:

- The Lansdowne Tapes (compilation of recordings by Spice, and outtakes from the first three Uriah Heep albums) – Recorded 1968–1971, released 1994
- A Time of Revelation (four-disc anthology of Uriah Heep material, including recordings by Spice) – Recorded 1968–1995, released 1996

Spice recordings on these compilations consisted of "Astranaza", "Born in a Trunk" (vocal and instrumental versions), "Celebrate", "I Want You Babe", "In Love", "Magic Lantern", "Schoolgirl", and "What About The Music". Additionally, two of the songs released on the first Uriah Heep album were recorded by the Spice line-up before Hensley's inclusion, with Colin Wood appearing on keyboards ("Come Away Melinda" and "Wake Up (Set Your Sights)").

"Astranaza" was originally a three-part composition, but only parts 1 and 2 were included on the compilations featuring it (part 3 was said to be a repeat of part 1).
