= Easy Livin': Singles A's & B's =

Easy Livin'

Compilation album by Uriah Heep
- Released: 24 October 2006
- Genre: Hard rock, progressive rock, arena rock
- Length: 158:54
- Label: Sanctuary

Uriah Heep compilation chronology
Chapter & Verse - The Uriah Heep Story (2005)	Easy Livin' (2006)	Bird of Prey - The Best Of (2006)

Professional ratings
Review scores
Source	Rating
AllMusic	4/5 stars

Easy Livin' is a compilation album by hard rock band Uriah Heep comprising almost all the band's singles, including several songs not available in the original albums.

== Track listing ==
Disc 1
No.	Title	Length
1.	"Gypsy" (single edit)	2:55
2.	"Wake Up (Set Your Sights)" (U.S. single edit)	3:35
3.	"Bird of Prey"	4:12
4.	"High Priestess" (single edit)	3:13
5.	"Time to Live"	4:00
6.	"Lady in Black" (single edit)	3:31
7.	"Simon the Bullet Freak" (non-album Euro single B-side)	3:24
8.	"Look at Yourself" (single edit)	3:04
9.	"The Wizard"	2:58
10.	"Easy Livin'"	2:34
11.	"Why" (non-album single B-side)	4:54
12.	"Stealin'"	3:15
13.	"Sunshine" (non-album single B-side)	4:47
14.	"Something or Nothing"	2:54
15.	"What Can I Do"	3:08
16.	"Prima Donna"	3:08
17.	"Shout It Out" (non-album single B-side)	3:33
18.	"Return to Fantasy" (single edit)	3:39
19.	"The Time Will Come" (non-album Euro single B-side)	4:07
20.	"Wise Man"	4:26
21.	"Crime of Passion" (non-album single B-side)	3:35
22.	"Masquerade"	3:45
Total length:		79:06

Disc 2
No.	Title	Length
1.	"Free Me"	3:31
2.	"Love or Nothing"	2:39
3.	"Gimme Love" (non-album Euro single B-side)	3:14
4.	"Come Back to Me"	4:11
5.	"Cheater" (non-album single B-side)	3:56
6.	"A Right to Live" (non-album promo, single B-side)	3:33
7.	"Carry On"	2:59
8.	"Been Hurt" (non-album single B-side)	3:54
9.	"Love Stealer" (non-album single B-side)	3:23
10.	"Think It Over"	3:29
11.	"My Joanna Needs Tuning" (non-album single B-side)	2:51
12.	"On the Rebound" (single edit)	3:12
13.	"Tin Soldier" (non-album single B-side)	3:49
14.	"Son of a Bitch" (non-album single B-side)	4:04
15.	"That's the Way That It Is"	4:06
16.	"Stay on Top"	3:36
17.	"Playing for Time" (non-album single B-side)	4:23
18.	"Hold Your Head Up"	3:22
19.	"Miracle Child"	4:08
20.	"Blood Red Roses"	3:39
21.	"Look at Yourself" (live)	7:24
Total length:		79:48
