= Cliff Bennett =

Cliff Bennett may refer to:

- Cliff Bennett and the Rebel Rousers, 1960s British rhythm and blues, soul and beat group
- Cliff Bennett (footballer) (1884–1957), Australian rules footballer
- Cliff Bennett (musician) (born 1940), British singer and musician
