= 100 Ton Chicken =

Studio album by Chicken Shack
- Released: October 1969
- Recorded: 19 April – 11 May 1969
- Studio: Morgan Sound Studios, Willesden, London,
- Genre: Blues
- Length: 35:28
- Label: Blue Horizon
- Producer: Mike Vernon

Chicken Shack chronology
O.K. Ken? (1969)	100 Ton Chicken (1969)	Accept (1970)

100 Ton Chicken is the third studio album by the blues band, Chicken Shack, released in 1969. This album was Paul Raymond's first album as a member of Chicken Shack, replacing Christine Perfect.

Unlike its predecessors, 40 Blue Fingers, Freshly Packed and Ready to Serve and O.K. Ken?, 100 Ton Chicken did not reach the UK Albums Chart. Peter Kurtz, writing for AllMusic, noted "Sorry, but this chicken laid a 20-ton rotten egg".

The entire album and the rest of the Chicken Shack sessions on Blue Horizon were made available on the CD compilation Chicken Shack - The Complete Blue Horizon Sessions (2007). Several outtakes from the 100 Ton Chicken sessions were made available for the first time on this compilation. "Smartest Girl in the World" and "Hideaway" were both unpublished outtakes. "The Things You Put Me Through" was also an outtake but it had been released as the B side to the single "Tears in the Wind".

== Track listing ==
All songs written and composed by Stan Webb, except where noted.

Side one
No.	Title	Writer(s)	Length
1.	"The Road of Love"	Clarence Carter	3:30
2.	"Look Ma, I'm Cryin'"	Rudy Toombs, Jerry Harris, Windsor King	3:25
3.	"Evelyn"		4:18
4.	"Reconsider Baby"	Lowell Fulson	3:25
5.	"Weekend Love"	Clarence Carter	2:14

Side two
No.	Title	Writer(s)	Length
1.	"Midnight Hour"	Clarence "Gatemouth" Brown	2:55
2.	"Tears in the Wind"		2:45
3.	"Horse and Cart"		3:36
4.	"The Way It Is"		4:29
5.	"Still Worried About My Woman"		3:12
6.	"Anji"	Davey Graham	1:39

== Personnel ==
=== Chicken Shack ===
- Stan Webb – guitar, vocals
- Paul Raymond – keyboards, vocals
- Andy Sylvester – bass guitar
- Dave Bidwell – drums, congas, cowbell

=== Additional personnel ===
- Mike Vernon – finger cymbals

=== Production ===
- Producer – Mike Vernon
- Engineer – Mike Ross
- Studio – CBS
- Photography and design – Terence Ibbott
