= Cliff Bennett (musician) =

British singer (born 1940)

- Born: Clifford Bennett; 4 June 1940 (age 86); Slough, Berkshire, England
- Genres: Rhythm and blues; beat music; soul
- Occupations: Singer; musician
- Instruments: Vocals; guitar
- Years active: 1957–late 1970s
- Labels: Parlophone; Rare Earth
- Formerly of: The Rebel Rousers; Toe Fat; Shanghai

Clifford Bennett (born June 4, 1940), known by his stage name Cliff Bennett, is a British former singer and musician who rose to fame in the 1960s as the frontman of the group The Rebel Rousers. After leaving the band, he led the groups Toe Fat and Shanghai, and also had an unsuccessful solo attempt, releasing his only album in 1971.

== Early Life ==
Bennett was born on June 4, 1940, in Slough, Buckinghamshire (now in Berkshire), United Kingdom, and in his early teens, he seemed destined to be a skilled foundry worker, though he loved music. In his mid-teens, he aspired to sing and learned to play the guitar in the United States, discovering that if he practiced more, he could perform in an American style.

== Career ==
=== The Rebel Rousers ===
Bennett formed the band in 1957. They recorded several singles with record producer Joe Meek that were released by Parlophone. Bennett continued recording for Parlophone, releasing cover versions of "You've Really Got a Hold on Me" and "Got My Mojo Working". Brian Epstein became their manager in September 1964. Their seventh release, "One Way Love" (written by Bert Berns and Jerry Ragovoy under their pseudonyms Bert Russell and Norman Meade) b/w "Slow Down", reached number 9 on the UK Singles Chart. Their next track, "I'll Take You Home" (written by Barry Mann and Cynthia Weil) b/w "Do You Love Him", reached number 42. "Three Rooms With Running Water" (written by Jimmy Radcliffe and Bob Halley) failed to chart. In early 1966, the band was the opening act for The Beatles on their final European tour. Bennett had the opportunity to hear Paul McCartney's song "Got to Get You into My Life", which was used on the album Revolver, though never released as a single. Bennett recorded it, with his own composition "Baby Each Day" on the B-side. McCartney produced the session. The record reached number 6 on the UK charts, becoming Bennett's biggest hit. Bennett returned to the McCartney/Lennon songbook in 1968 when he recorded "Back in the USSR" as Cliff Bennett and his Band. Released as a single on Parlophone, it failed to make any impression on the charts. Also in 1968, The Rebel Rousers left Cliff Bennett and Harvey Hinsley joined the band, which by then included Hodges, Burt, John Golden, Moss Groves, and Roy Young.

=== Later career ===
Bennett went on to become part of Toe Fat. Following the disbandment of Toe Fat, two of its members (Ken Hensley and Lee Kerslake) joined Uriah Heep, and Bennett was asked to join them, but he turned it down. He was also considered for the role of lead vocalist in Blood, Sweat & Tears when David Clayton-Thomas left in the early 70s, but he once again turned down the position. Bennett released a solo album, Rebellion, in 1971, but was unable to rekindle his success from the previous decade. Between 1975 and 1976, he was the vocalist for a band called Shanghai, which released two albums. Other members were Mick Green (guitar), Chuck Bedford (vocals, harmonica, 1974–75), Pete Kircher (drums, vocals), Mike Le Main (bass, keyboards, 1974–75), Brian Alterman (guitar, 1975–76), and Pat King (bass, 1975–76). In the late 1970s, Bennett retired from the music industry to pursue sailing.

== Discography ==
=== Albums ===
- 1965: Cliff Bennett & the Rebel Rousers
- 1966: Drivin' You Wild
- 1967: Got to Get You into Our Life

Note: On bootleg recordings of the Beatles performing at the Star Club in Hamburg, Germany, a performance of "Hully Gully" (recorded the same night as a Beatles set) is often mistakenly included as a Beatles performance.

As Cliff Bennett & His Band

- 1968: Cliff Bennett Branches Out

=== EPs ===
- 1964 "She Said Yeah"/"Doctor Feelgood"/"You Make Me Happy"/"Stupidity", GEP 8923
- 1965: Try It Baby – "I'm Crazy 'Bout My Baby"/"Shoes"/"Try It Baby"/"Do It Right", Parlophone GEP 8936
- 1966: We're Gonna Make It – "My Sweet Woman"/"Whole Lotta Woman"/"We're Gonna Make It"/"Waiting at the Station", Parlophone GEP 8955

=== Singles ===
- July 1961: "You've Got What I Like" / "I'm in Love with You", Parlophone R 4793
- October 1961: "That's What I Said" / "When I Get Paid", Parlophone R 4836
- March 1962: "Poor Joe" / "Hurtin' Inside", Parlophone R 4895
- July 1963: "Everybody Loves a Lover" / "My Old Stand By", Parlophone R 5046
- November 1963: "You Really Got a Hold on Me" / "Alright", Parlophone
- March 1964: "Got My Mojo Working" / "Beautiful Dreamer", Parlophone R 5119
- September 1964: "One Way Love" / "Slow Down", Parlophone R 5173 - UK No. 9
- January 1965: "I'll Take You Home" / "Do You Love Him?", Parlophone R 5229 - UK No. 42
- April 1965: "Three Rooms with Running Water" / "If Only You'd Reply", Parlophone R 5259
- August 1965: "I Have Cried My Last Tear" / "As Long as She Looks Like You", Parlophone R 5317
- February 1966: "You Can't Love 'Em All" / "Need Your Loving Tonight", Parlophone R 5406
- June 1966: "Eyes for You" / "Hold On I'm Coming", Parlophone R 5466
- August 1966: "Got to Get You into My Life" / "Baby Each Day", Parlophone R 5489 - UK No. 6
- November 1966: "Never Knew Lovin' Could Be So Doggone Good" / "Don't Help Me Out", Parlophone R 5534
- February 1967: "I'll Take Good Care of You" / "I'm Sorry", Parlophone R 5565
- May 1967: "I'll Be There" / "Use Me"
- August 1967: "Good Times" / "Lonely Weekends", Parlophone R 5711

=== Albums ===
- Toe Fat (1970)
- Toe Fat Two (1970)

=== Singles ===
- Bad Side Of The Moon / Working Nights (1970)
