= Lady in Black (Uriah Heep song) =

Single by Uriah Heep

from the album Salisbury
- B-side: "Simon the Bullit Freak"
- Released: June 1971
- Recorded: October–November 1970
- Genre: Progressive rock, folk rock
- Length: 4:44
- Label: Vertigo
- Songwriter: Ken Hensley
- Producer: Gerry Bron

Uriah Heep singles chronology
"Gypsy" (1970)	"Lady in Black" (1971)	"Look at Yourself" (1971)

"Lady in Black" is a song by the rock band Uriah Heep. It is the fourth track of their 1971 album Salisbury.

The song is credited to Ken Hensley. It narrates the story of a man wandering through war-torn darkness and encountering a goddess-like entity who consoles him. It is often praised, by fans and critics alike, as Hensley's most poetic work. There were many b-sides for this song as a single. The most famous was "Simon the Bullet Freak" but "Bird of Prey" has also been the B-side for the song. In 1981 the song was re-released as a single in Germany and in Netherlands and the b-side was "Easy Livin'".

== Background ==
A brief comment on the cover of the original vinyl release commented that for Ken Hensley inspiration was a real case: a surprise visit of a rural vicar's daughter at a moment when he was in a very depressed state. The result of this meeting, and - some kind of insight - was the song "Lady in Black": a philosophical parable that tells us that evil cannot be overcome by evil itself. Later in an interview Hensley said, though: "...And the girl that inspired it will never know. I saw her through my hotel room window, but we never met!"

According to Ken Hensley, he sang the lead vocals because David Byron did not like the song and refused to record it during the Salisbury sessions. Producer Gerry Bron proposed Hensley record the lead vocals, which he did.

== History ==
"Lady in Black" has been performed in the form of rock ballads (and not having the traditional verse-chorus), and has become one of the most popular concert numbers of Uriah Heep. It achieved great success in Germany and Russia. While the song was never released as a single in the United Kingdom and United States, it made it into the German singles charts three times during the seventies. The 1977 re-release, in particular, became a major hit. It spent nine weeks in the German Top 20 during 1977, peaking at number 5 and a further seven weeks in the Top 20 during 1978, maintaining the number 5 peak position. For this achievement Uriah Heep got the "Golden Lion" award, the German equivalent of a Grammy or Brit Award.

The song was subsequently re-recorded for two of their greatest hits albums: Totally Driven (2001) and Celebration – Forty Years of Rock (2009).

== Personnel ==
- Mick Box – lead and acoustic guitar
- Ken Hensley – acoustic guitar, lead and backing vocals, mellotron, piano
- Paul Newton – bass guitar
- Keith Baker – drums

== Cover versions ==
- Acts who have covered "Lady in Black" include the Gregorian chant project Gregorian on their 2006 album Masters of Chant Chapter V.
- Covered by Jack Frost on the band's 1999 album Glow Dying Sun.
- Finnish folk metal band Ensiferum covered the song, released as a bonus track on the 2007 album Victory Songs.
- The song was translated into Finnish and covered by another Finnish band Lemon in 1972 as "Nainen tummissa".
- In 1972 Italian singer Caterina Caselli covered the song in her album Caterina Caselli 1972, with title L'uomo del Paradiso; Italian translation has been made by Claudio Daiano and Ettore Carrera.
- The song was covered by the Spanish folk metal group Mägo de Oz in a translated version as "Dama Negra".
- Swiss garage band Die Zorros recorded an instrumental version entitled "Ahhh."
- Serbian heavy metal band Kraljevski Apartman recorded a cover version with Serbian lyrics entitled Slike on their 2000 album Izgubljen u vremenu.
- Czech heavy metal band Arakain recorded a cover version with Czech lyrics titled Slečna závist (Miss Envy) on their 1995 cover album Legendy (Legends).
- Italian singer Spagna covered the song in her 2002 album Woman.
- In 1989, the Russian band Kommunizm recorded a Russian version with different lyrics titled Vesely tanec sheik, releasing it on their Let It Be album..
- There is also an Italian-language version, titled Di nero vestita, included in Io sono il vampiro, a 2005 album (O.S.T. of the homonymous 2002 horror movie) by the Italian progressive rock band Abiogenesi.
- In 2002 the Romanian group Iris together with Mick Box and Bernie Shaw from Uriah Heep made a new version of this song named "Doamna in negru". This new version was a collaboration between Iris and the two members of Uriah Heep and the lyrics are bilingual in Romanian and in English.
- Ken Hensley also covered this song on his album The Wizard's Diary in 2004 and the version 8 minutes long while the original is no longer than 4 minutes and 44 seconds.
- The song was covered and translated on Ukrainian by singer-songwriter Yuriy Veres 2012 album 60/70.
- John Lawton covered the song during one of his live concerts.
- Blackmore's Night covered this song on their album Dancer and the Moon in 2013.
- In 2020, Vyacheslav Butusov released a cover version of this song, dedicated to the memory of Ken Hensley.
- Damh the Bard covered this song on his album Sabbat in 2015.
- The german electro-gothic group Dorsetshire covered the song on their album Das letzte Gefecht in 1994.

== Charts ==
=== Weekly charts ===
Chart (1977–1978)	Peak position
South Africa (Springbok Radio)	6
Switzerland (Schweizer Hitparade)	5
West Germany (GfK)	5

=== Year-end charts ===
Chart (1977)	Peak position
West Germany (Official German Charts)	41

Chart (1978)	Peak position
West Germany (Official German Charts)	52
