= Accept (Chicken Shack album) =

Studio album by Chicken Shack
- Released: 12 June 1970
- Recorded: 1 December 1969 – 11 March 1970
- Studios: CBS Studios, New Bond Street, London and Recorded Sound Studios, Bryanston Street, London.
- Genres: Blues rock, psychedelic rock, hard rock
- Label: Blue Horizon
- Producer: Mike Vernon

Chicken Shack chronology
100 Ton Chicken (1969)	Accept (1970)	Imagination Lady (1972)

Accept is the fourth studio album by the blues band, Chicken Shack, released in 1970. Accept was Chicken Shack's last album on the Blue Horizon label. This album was also the last for Andy Sylvester, Dave Bidwell and Paul Raymond as members of Chicken Shack. It also marks a departure from pure blues to a more progressive and psychedelic sound.

The entire album and the rest of the Chicken Shack sessions on Blue Horizon were made available on the CD compilation Chicken Shack – The Complete Blue Horizon Sessions (2007).

The German heavy metal band Accept took its name from this album.

== Track listing ==
All songs written and composed by Stan Webb and Paul Raymond.

=== Side one ===
1. "Diary of Your Life"
2. "Pocket"*
3. "Never Ever"*
4. "Sad Clown"*
5. "Maudie"*
6. "Telling Your Fortune"

=== Side two ===
1. "Tired Eyes"
2. "Some Other Time"*
3. "Going Round"
4. "Andalucian Blues"
5. "You Knew You Did You Did"
6. "She Didn't Use Her Loaf"

== Personnel ==
Chicken Shack

- Stan Webb – guitar, vocals
- Paul Raymond – keyboards, vocals
- Andy Sylvester – bass guitar
- Dave Bidwell – drums

Production

- Producer – Mike Vernon
- Engineer – Mike Ross
- Studio – CBS
- Photography and design – Terence Ibbott
