= Chicken Shack =

English blues and rock band

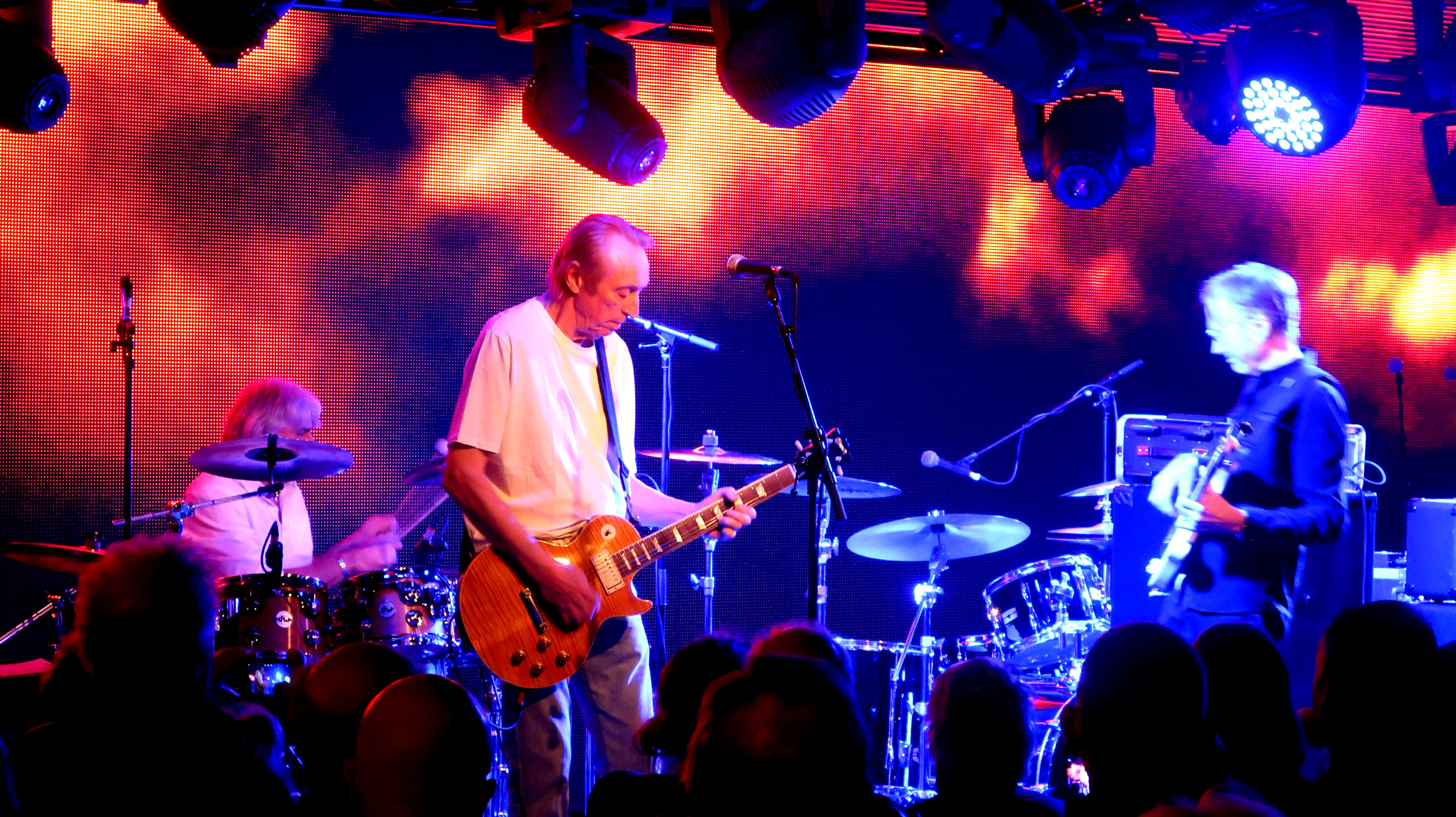
- Chicken Shack performing in 2016

Background information
- Genres: Blues; blues rock
- Years active: 1965–1974; 1976–present
- Labels: Blue Horizon; Deram Records; Nova; Shark; Warner Music Group; Gull; Epic Records; RCA Records; SPV (Germany); Strange Fruit Records; Mystic
- Members: Stan Webb; Gary Davies; Jim Rudge
- Past members: See list

Chicken Shack are a British blues and rock band, founded in the mid-1960s by Stan Webb (guitar and vocals), Andy Silvester (bass guitar), and Alan Morley (drums), who were later joined by Christine Perfect (later McVie) (vocals and keyboards) in 1967. Chicken Shack has performed with various line-ups, Stan Webb being the only constant member.

== Career ==
David "Rowdy" Yeats and Andy Silvester had formed Sounds of Blue in March 1964 as a Stourbridge-based rhythm and blues band. They invited Stan Webb, who was leaving local band The Shades 5, to join them in August 1964. The band also included Christine Perfect and Chris Wood (later to join Traffic) amongst others in their line up. With a new line-up Chicken Shack was formed as a trio in April 1965, naming themselves after Jimmy Smith's Back at the Chicken Shack album.

Chicken shacks (open-air roadside chicken stands) had also been frequently mentioned in blues and R&B songs, as in Amos Milburn's hit, "Chicken Shack Boogie"

Jimmy Smith's classic 12-bar blues instrumental was frequently performed live by Muddy Waters's touring band during the 1960s when they would launch into the instrumental groove to warm up the crowd and set the mood before Muddy Waters was officially introduced and walked out to take center stage. The track was also covered by Charlie Musselwhite on his 1967 debut Stand Back! Here Comes Charley Musselwhite's Southside Band.

Over the next few years Chicken Shack had a residency at the Star-Club, Hamburg with Morley, then Al Sykes, Hughie Flint (who was John Mayall's drummer when Eric Clapton was in the band) and later Dave Bidwell on drums.

=== 40 Blue Fingers, Freshly Packed and Ready to Serve ===
Chicken Shack made their first UK appearance at the 1967 National Jazz and Blues Festival, Windsor and signed to Mike Vernon's Blue Horizon record label in the same year. Their first single “It's Okay With Me Baby / When My Left Eye Jumps” (BH 57-3135), was released in 1968, shortly before their first LP release 40 Blue Fingers, Freshly Packed and Ready to Serve was released later that year. Christine Perfect composed and sang on side A of the first single and Stan Webb composed and sang the flip side. Both sides of the first single were not included in the first LP release. The first single and the debut LP attracted a lot of attention and 40 Blue Fingers… ended up having considerable chart success (No. 12 on the UK Albums Chart). While waiting to finish their second LP, the band released a second single, "Worried About My Woman" / "Six Nights In Seven" (BH 57-3143) in late 1968 with little fanfare. Both songs were composed and sung by Stan Webb.

=== O.K. Ken? ===
Their second LP, O.K. Ken? was released in February 1969 and also garnered chart success. While it did surpass the first album by reaching No. 9, unlike the initial LP, it quickly dropped out of the chart due to the lack of an album single to support it. The band then decided to release a song from the first album (40 Blue Fingers...), "When The Train Comes Back” (BH 57-3146) after overdubbing a horn section to the original track. The flipside “Hey Baby” was an outtake of the O.K. Ken? album. Christine Perfect composed and provided piano and lead vocals on both tracks, but the single was only mildly successful.

=== "I'd Rather Go Blind" single ===
Chicken Shack had become a mainstay of the white blues boom in the late 1960s, and they enjoyed some commercial success with their two first albums reaching the Top 20 in UK Albums Chart. Worried that the band's popularity would fade without a successful radio single, they decided to record a song that had been successful for Etta James in the US. The single "I'd Rather Go Blind" (c/w "Night Life") ended up becoming successful with Perfect singing lead vocals. The single was successful enough that it garnered Perfect the 'Top Female Singer' on the Melody Maker's Reader's Poll in 1969.

=== Christine Perfect's departure ===
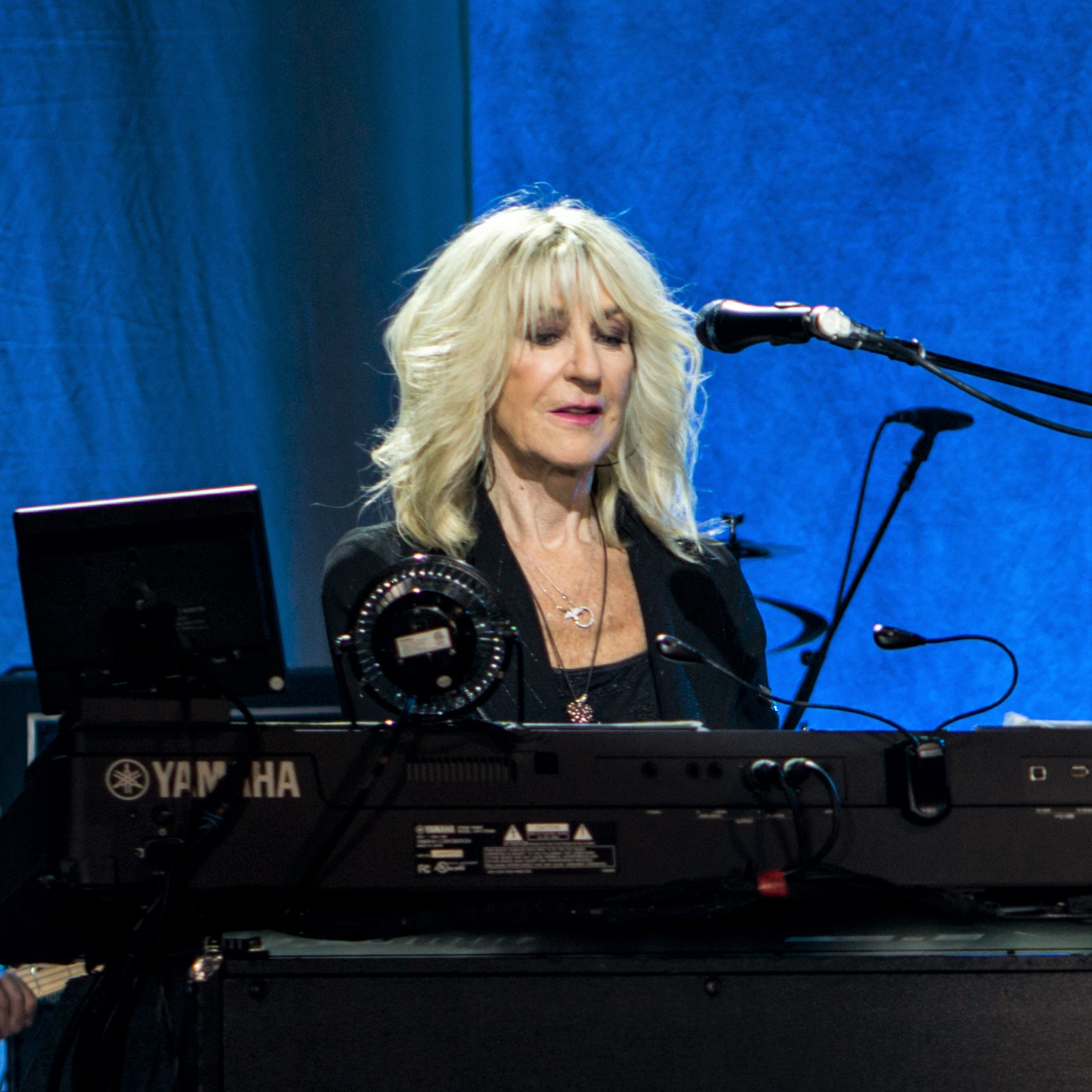
Original member Christine McVie (pictured in 2017) left to join Fleetwood Mac in 1970

The single "I'd Rather Go Blind" had been recorded after the release of the first two LPs and Perfect had already decided to leave the band and retire from the music business before the single had become successful. By this time, she had already quietly married bass player John McVie from the blues band Fleetwood Mac and did not wish to be touring in a separate band. Because of the success of the single, the band's record label, Blue Horizon, convinced her to release a solo album before considering retirement. The exact single recording by Chicken Shack of "I'd Rather Go Blind" was included on Perfect’s eponymous album, Christine Perfect, released on Blue Horizon. After Perfect’s departure from the band in 1969, she was quickly replaced by Paul Raymond from Plastic Penny. Chicken Shack continued recording and performing live, releasing a few more albums and having some success with the single "Tears in the Wind" (c/w "The Things You Put Me Through").

After being dropped by Blue Horizon, pianist Paul Raymond, bassist Andy Silvester, and drummer Dave Bidwell all left in 1971 to join Savoy Brown. At this point Webb reformed the band as a trio with John Glascock on bass and Paul Hancox on drums, and they recorded Imagination Lady. The line-up did not last; Glascock left to join Carmen, while Webb was recruited for Savoy Brown in 1974 and recorded the album Boogie Brothers with them.

Since 1977, Webb has revived the Chicken Shack name on a number of occasions, with a rotating membership of British blues musicians including, at various times, Paul Butler (ex-Jellybread, Keef Hartley Band) (guitar), Keef Hartley, ex-Ten Years After drummer Ric Lee and Miller Anderson, some of whom came and went several times. The band has remained popular as a live attraction in Europe throughout.

Webb remains as their only constant band member.

== Personnel ==
=== Members ===
Current

- Stan Webb – guitar, vocals (1965–1974, 1976–present)
- Gary Davies – guitar (1988–present)
- Jim Rudge – bass (1998–present)

Former

- Andy Silvester – bass (1965–1971)
- Alan Morley – drums (1965–1968)
- Christine Perfect – keyboards, vocals (1968–1969; died 2022)
- Chris Wood – saxophone, flute
- Al Sykes – drums (1968)
- Hughie Flint – drums (1968)
- Dave Bidwell – drums, percussion (1968–1971; died 1977)
- Paul Raymond – keyboards, vocals (1969–1971; died 2019)
- John Glascock – bass (1971–1972; died 1979)
- Pip Pyle – drums (1971; died 2006)
- Paul Hancox – drums, percussion (1971–1972)
- Bob Daisley – bass (1972,1975,1979–1980)
- David Wilkinson – keyboards (1972–1974, 1986–1993; died 2005)
- Rob Hull – bass (1972–1974)
- Alan Powell – drums (1972–1974)
- Bob Clouter - drums (1975)
- Dave Winthrop – saxophone (1976–1979, 1986–1987, 2008–2012)
- Robbie Blunt – guitar (1975, 1976–1979)
- Ed Spivock – drums (1976–1979)
- Paul Martinez – bass (1976–1978)
- Steve York – bass (1978–1979)
- Paul Butler – guitar (1979–1981)
- Keef Hartley – drums (1979–1980; died 2011)
- Ric Lee – drums (1980–1981)
- Alan Scott – bass (1980)
- Andy Pyle – bass (1980–1986)
- Tony Ashton – keyboards (1981; died 2001)
- Miller Anderson – guitar (1981–1986)
- Russ Alder – drums (1981–1983)
- John Gunsell – drums (1983–1987)
- Roger Saunders – guitar (1983–1986)
- Andy Scott – bass (1983–1986)
- Jan Connolly – bass (1986–1987)
- Bev Smith – drums (1987–2002; died 2007)
- Wayne Terry – bass (1987)
- David Wintour – bass (1987–1991; died 2022)
- James Morgan – bass (1991–1998)
- Mick Jones – drums (2002–2010)
- Chris Williams – drums (2010–2012)
- Romek Parol – drums (2012–2013)

=== Line-ups ===
1965–1968	1968	1968	1968
Stan Webb – guitar, vocals; Alan Morley – drums; Andy Silvester – bass	Stan Webb – guitar, vocals; Alan Morley – drums; Andy Silvester – bass; Christine Perfect – keyboards, vocals	Stan Webb – guitar, vocals; Andy Silvester – bass; Christine Perfect – keyboards, vocals; Al Sykes – drums	Stan Webb – guitar, vocals; Andy Silvester – bass; Christine Perfect – keyboards, vocals; Hughie Flint – drums
1968–1969	1969–1971	1971	1971–1972
Stan Webb – guitar, vocals; Andy Silvester – bass; Christine Perfect – keyboards, vocals; Dave Bidwell – drums	Stan Webb – guitar, vocals; Andy Silvester – bass; Dave Bidwell – drums; Paul Raymond – keyboards	Stan Webb – guitar, vocals; John Glascock – bass; Pip Pyle – drums	Stan Webb – guitar, vocals; John Glascock – bass; Paul Hancox – drums
1972	1972–1974	1975-1976	1976–1978
Stan Webb – guitar, vocals; Paul Hancox – drums; Bob Daisley – bass	Stan Webb – guitar, vocals; Rob Hull – bass; Alan Powell – drums; David Wilkinson – keyboards	Disbanded	Stan Webb – guitar, vocals; Robbie Blunt – guitar; Paul Martinez – bass; Ed Spivock – drums; Dave Winthrop – saxophone
1978–1979	1979–1980	1980	1980–1981
Stan Webb – guitar, vocals; Robbie Blunt – guitar; Ed Spivock – drums; Dave Winthrop – saxophone; Steve York – bass	Stan Webb – guitar, vocals; Paul Butler – guitar; Bob Daisley – bass; Keef Hartley – drums	Stan Webb – guitar, vocals; Paul Butler – guitar; Ric Lee – drums; Alan Scott – bass	Stan Webb – guitar, vocals; Paul Butler – guitar; Ric Lee – drums; Andy Pyle – bass
1981	1981–1983	1983–1986	1986–1987
Stan Webb – guitar, vocals; Paul Butler – guitars; Ric Lee – drums; Andy Pyle – bass; Tony Ashton – keyboards	Stan Webb – guitar, vocals; Andy Pyle – bass; Russ Alder – drums; Miller Anderson – guitar	Stan Webb – guitar, vocals; Andy Pyle – bass; Miller Anderson – guitar; John Gunsell – drums; Roger Saunders – guitar; Andy Scott – bass	Stan Webb – guitar, vocals; John Gunsell – drums; Jan Connolly – bass; David Wilkinson – keyboards; Dave Winthrop – saxophone
1987	1987–1988	1988–1991	1991–1993
Stan Webb – guitar, vocals; David Wilkinson – keyboards; Bev Smith – drums; Wayne Terry – bass	Stan Webb – guitar, vocals; David Wilkinson – keyboards; Bev Smith – drums; David Wintour – bass	Stan Webb – guitar, vocals; David Wilkinson – keyboards; Bev Smith – drums; David Wintour – bass; Gary Davies – guitar	Stan Webb – guitar, vocals; David Wilkinson – keyboards; Bev Smith – drums; Gary Davies – guitar; James Morgan – bass
1993–1998	1998–2002	2002–2008	2008–2010
Stan Webb – guitar, vocals; Bev Smith – drums; Gary Davies – guitar; James Morgan – bass	Stan Webb – guitar, vocals; Bev Smith – drums; Gary Davies – guitar; Jim Rudge – bass	Stan Webb – guitar, vocals; Gary Davies – guitar; Jim Rudge – bass; Mick Jones – drums	Stan Webb – guitar, vocals; Gary Davies – guitar; Jim Rudge – bass; Mick Jones – drums; Dave Winthrop – saxophone
2010–2012	2012–2013	2013–present	1975
Stan Webb – guitar, vocals; Gary Davies – guitar; Jim Rudge – bass; Dave Winthrop – saxophone; Chris Williams – drums	Stan Webb – guitar, vocals; Gary Davies – guitar; Jim Rudge – bass; Romek Parol – drums	Stan Webb – guitar, vocals; Gary Davies – guitar; Jim Rudge – bass	Stan Webb - guitar, vocals; Robbie Blunt - slide guitar; Bob Daisley - bass; Bob Clouter - drums

== Discography ==
=== Albums ===
- 40 Blue Fingers, Freshly Packed and Ready to Serve (1968), Blue Horizon – UK Albums Chart No. 12
- O.K. Ken? (1969), Blue Horizon – UK Albums Chart No. 9
- 100 Ton Chicken (1969), Blue Horizon
- Accept (1970), Blue Horizon
- Imagination Lady (1972), Deram
- Unlucky Boy (1973), Deram
- Goodbye Chicken Shack (Live) (1974), Nova; London
- That's the Way We Are (1978), Shark [as Stan Webb's Chicken Shack]
- The Creeper (1978), WEA [as Stan Webb's Chicken Shack]
- Chicken Shack (1979), Gull
- Roadies Concerto (Live) (1981), RCA Records [as Stan Webb's Chicken Shack]
- 39 Bars (1981), Bellaphon [as Stan Webb's Chicken Shack]
- Simply Live (Live) (1989), SPV (Germany) [as Stan Webb's Chicken Shack]
- On Air (BBC sessions) (1998), Strange Fruit Records
- Black Night (1999), [as Stan Webb's Chicken Shack]
- Webb (2001)
- Still Live After All These Years (2004), Mystic
- Stan Webb (2004)

=== Compilations ===
- Double ("Unlucky Boy" + "Goodbye Chicken Shack") (1977), Deram Records
- Stan the Man (Live) (1977), Nova Records
- In the Can (1980), Epic Records
- The Very Best of Chicken Shack (1990), CBS Records
- Reflections (1993), Secret Records [as Stan Webb with Chicken Shack]
- Stan The Man (2002), Decca Records
- Going Up, Going Down – The Anthology (2004), Castle Music
- Poor Boy: The Deram Years (2006), Castle Music [as Stan Webb's Chicken Shack]
- Strange Situations: The Indigo Sessions (2006), Sanctuary Records [as Stan Webb's Chicken Shack]
- Reflections ("Plucking Good" + "Changes (Expanded Edition)") (2008), Secret Records [as Stan Webb with Chicken Shack]
- Chicken Shack – The Complete Blue Horizon Sessions (2007), Blue Horizon Records

=== Singles ===
Year	Name	UK
1968	"It's Okay With Me Baby / When My Left Eye Jumps" (BH 57-3135)	-
1968	"Worried About My Woman / Six Nights In Seven" (BH 57-3143)	-
1969	"When The Train Comes Back / Hey Baby" (BH 57-3146)	-
1969	"I'd Rather Go Blind / Night Life" (BH 57-3153)	14
1969	"Tears In The Wind / The Things You Put Me Through" (BH 57-3160)	29
1970	"Maudie / Andalucian Blues" (BH 57-3168)	-
1970	"Sad Clown / Tired Eyes" (BH 57-3176)	-
