= The 2nd of May =

Studio album by May Blitz
- Released: 1971
- Recorded: Air Studios, London
- Genre: Hard rock, heavy metal
- Length: 38:12
- Label: Vertigo
- Producer: John Anthony

May Blitz chronology
May Blitz (1970)	The 2nd of May (1971)

The 2nd of May is the second LP from British/Canadian trio May Blitz. It was released in 1971 following up their previous self-titled release. This was the first May Blitz album that was not self produced by the band. Instead, the band hired producer John Anthony. The album saw the band introducing elements of folk and space rock into their sound.

== Track listing ==
All songs written by Hudson/Newman/Black except where noted

Side one

1. For Mad Men Only - 4:15
2. Snakes and Ladders - 4:40
3. The 25th of December - 3:11
4. In Part - 6:07

Side two

1. 8 Mad Grim Nits - 4:30
2. High Beech - 5:00
3. Honey Coloured Time - 4:12
4. Just Thinking - 6:17 (Black)

== Personnel ==
- Bass, vocals – R. Hudson
- Drums, percussion – T. Newman
- Guitar, twelve-string guitar, vocals – J. Black
- Artwork – Tony Benyon
- Photography – Chris Hopper
- Producer – John Anthony
- Engineer – Dave Harries
