= Drifting Along (disambiguation) =

Drifting Along is a 1946 American western film directed by Derwin Abrahams.

Drifting Along may also refer to:

- "Drifting Along", song by flamenco-rock band Carmen from Dancing on a Cold Wind 1974
- "Drifting Along", song by Jamiroquai from Travelling Without Moving
