= O.K. Ken? =

Studio album by Chicken Shack
- Released: February 1969
- Recorded: 24 June and 22–23 October 1968
- Studio: CBS Studios, London
- Genre: Blues
- Length: 38:21
- Label: Blue Horizon
- Producer: Mike Vernon

Chicken Shack chronology
40 Blue Fingers, Freshly Packed and Ready to Serve (1968)	O.K. Ken? (1969)	100 Ton Chicken (1969)

O.K. Ken? is the second studio album by the blues band Chicken Shack, released in February 1969. O.K Ken? reached number 9 in the UK Albums Chart, three places higher than its predecessor, 40 Blue Fingers, Freshly Packed and Ready to Serve. It was the last album with Christine Perfect as a member of Chicken Shack.

== Background ==
O.K. Ken? was released in February 1969 and garnered chart success, like the band's only previous album 40 Blue Fingers, Freshly Packed and Ready to Serve. It surpassed the first album by reaching No. 9 on the British charts, but unlike that LP, it quickly dropped out of the charts due to the lack of an album single to support it. The band then decided to release a song from the first album, "When The Train Comes Back" (BH 57-3146), after overdubbing a horn section over the original track. The flipside of the single was "Hey Baby", an outtake of the O.K. Ken? album sessions. Christine Perfect composed and provided piano and lead vocals on both single tracks but the single release was only mildly successful.

Stan Webb wrote four of the songs on the album and co-wrote two others with Perfect. Webb sang all of his compositions and Perfect sang on the Perfect/Webb collaboration, "Get Like You Use to Be". Webb and Perfect sang a duet on the other Perfect/Webb collaboration, "A Woman Is The Blues". Additionally, Perfect sang on covers, "I Wanna See My Baby" and "Mean Old World". The "Pony Trap" and "Remington Ride" are both instrumentals.

The entire album and the rest of the Chicken Shack sessions on Blue Horizon were made available on the CD compilation Chicken Shack – The Complete Blue Horizon Sessions (2007).

After leaving the band, Perfect joined Fleetwood Mac in July 1970, and "Get Like You Used to Be" became a staple of Fleetwood Mac's live act from 1970 to 1975. Guitarists Danny Kirwan, Jeremy Spencer, Peter Green, Bob Welch, Bob Weston, and Lindsey Buckingham all featured on different performances of the song throughout the band's ever-changing lineups.

== Track listing ==
=== Side one ===
1. "Baby's Got Me Crying" (Stan Webb) – 2:25
2. "The Right Way Is My Way" (Webb) – 2:00
3. "Get Like You Used to Be" (Christine Perfect, Webb) – 3:05
4. "Pony and Trap" (Webb) – 3:00
5. "Tell Me" (Chester Burnette) – 4:40
6. "A Woman Is the Blues" (Perfect, Webb) – 2:50

=== Side two ===
1. "I Wanna See My Baby" (Aaron Walker) – 3:30
2. "Remington Ride" (Herb Remington, Hank Penny) – 2:50
3. "Fishing in Your River" (Webb) – 4:30
4. "Mean Old World" (Walter Jacobs) – 3:15
5. "Sweet Sixteen" (Riley King, J. Josea) – 6:20

== Personnel ==
Chicken Shack

- Stan Webb – guitar, vocals
- Christine Perfect – keyboards, vocals
- Andy Sylvester – bass guitar
- Dave Bidwell – drums

Additional personnel

- Roderick Lee – trumpet
- Terry Noonan – trumpet
- Steve Gregory – tenor saxophone
- Buddy Beadle – alto and baritone saxophones
- Johnny Almond – tenor saxophone
- Don Fey – tenor saxophone
- Walter Horton – harmonica

Production

- Producer – Mike Vernon
- Engineer – Mike Ross
- Studio – CBS
- Photography and design – Terence Ibbott
