= Bakerloo (disambiguation) =

The Bakerloo line is a London Underground line which passes through both Baker Street and Waterloo.

Bakerloo may also refer to:

- Bakerloo (band), a late 1960s British rock/blues group
- Bakerloo Music, a record label owned by Mauro Picotto
