= Imagination Lady =

Studio album by Chicken Shack
- Released: 2 February 1972
- Recorded: October 1971
- Studios: Olympic Studios, London
- Genres: Blues, hard rock
- Length: 38:00
- Label: Deram
- Producer: Neil Slaven

Chicken Shack chronology
Accept (1970)	Imagination Lady (1972)	Unlucky Boy (1973)

Imagination Lady is the fifth studio album by the blues band Chicken Shack, released in 1972 on the Deram record label. It was reissued by Esoteric Recordings in July 2012 on CD in the UK.

== Track listing ==
All tracks composed by Stan Webb except where indicated:

=== Side one ===
1. "Crying Won't Help You Now" – 5:10 (Hudson Whittaker)
2. "Daughter of the Hillside" – 3:53
3. "If I Were a Carpenter" – 6:35 (Tim Hardin)
4. "Going Down" – 3:33 (Don Nix)

=== Side two ===
1. "Poor Boy" – 5:11
2. "Telling Your Fortune" – 11:11
3. "The Loser" – 2:32

== Personnel ==
Chicken Shack

- Stan Webb – guitar, vocals
- John Glascock – bass guitar
- Paul Hancox – drums

Production

- Producer – Neil Slaven
- Engineer – George Chkiantz
- Studio – Olympic Studios
- Cover painting – David Anstey
- Inside Photography – Brian Ward
