= May Blitz =

Canadian-British hard rock power trio

- Origin: England
- Genres: Hard rock, heavy metal
- Years active: 1969–1971
- Labels: Vertigo, Paramount
- Past members: Terry Poole; Keith Baker; Jamie Black; Reid Hudson; Tony Newman

May Blitz was a Canadian-British hard rock power trio that was active in the early 1970s.

The group was formed in 1969 by bassist Terry Poole and drummer Keith Baker, the rhythm section of the blues-rock trio Bakerloo, both of whom left the group when guitarist Clem Clempson departed to join Colosseum. Jamie Black joined the group on vocals and guitars but both Poole and Baker left the group before it recorded, Poole and Baker joining Vinegar Joe and Uriah Heep respectively. Black then added fellow Canadian Reid Hudson on bass and Tony Newman, who had played with Jeff Beck, The Hollies and Sounds Incorporated, on drums.

After playing UK pubs, the group signed with Vertigo Records (in the US they were on Paramount Records) and released their debut album in 1970. A second album followed in early 1971, but due to lack of commercial success the trio disbanded in late 1971. Black and Hudson, both originally from Canada, returned to their native country while Newman joined Three Man Army, founded and led by the Gurvitz brothers, Adrian and Paul. Newman later went on to a long career as a session drummer, including for David Bowie, Donovan, and George Harrison, and others.

== Discography ==
- May Blitz (Vertigo Records 6360007, 1970)
- 2nd of May (Vertigo Records 6360037, 1971)
- Essen 1970 (Thors Hammer THLP 003, 2012)
