= Unlucky Boy =

Studio album by Chicken Shack
- Released: July 1973
- Studio: Olympic Studios, London; Island Studio, London
- Genre: Blues rock
- Label: Deram
- Producer: Neil Slaven

Chicken Shack chronology
Imagination Lady (1972)	Unlucky Boy (1973)	Goodbye Chicken Shack (1974)

Unlucky Boy is the sixth studio album by the blues band Chicken Shack, released in 1973.

== Track listing ==
=== Side one ===
1. "You Know You Could Be Right" (Stan Webb) – 3:47
2. "Revelation" (Webb) – 5:13
3. "Prudence's Party" (Webb) – 3:14
4. "Too Late to Cry" (Lonnie Johnson) – 3:10
5. "Stan the Man" (Webb) – 4:25

=== Side two ===
1. "Unlucky Boy" (Big Mama Thornton, William Dupree) – 2:34
2. "As Time Goes Passing By" (Webb) – 4:46
3. "Jammin' with Ash" (Webb) – 7:04
4. "He Knows the Rules" (Jimmy McCracklin) – 4:05

=== CD bonus tracks ===
1. "As Time Goes Passing By" [Single version] – 3:33
2. "Hear Me Cry" – 3:55
3. "Think" – 2:16
4. "It's Easy" – 4:55
5. "Doctor Brown" – 3:01
- ABOVE TRACKS 3 TO 5 from Stan Webb's Chicken Shack – The Creeper (1978)
- Bass Guitar – Paul Martinez
- Drums – Ed Spevock
- Engineer – Manfred Neuner
- Guitar – Robbie Blunt
- Guitar, Vocals – Stan Webb
- Keyboards, Producer – Tony Ashton
- Tenor Saxophone, Soprano Saxophone – Dave Winthrop
- Notes: Recorded at Tonstudio Hiltpoltstein (West) Germany Nov/Dec 1977.

== Personnel ==
- Stan Webb – guitar, vocals
- Bob Daisley – bass guitar
- Tony Ashton – piano
- Paul Hancox – drums, percussion
- Chris Mercer – saxophones
- Nick Pickett – solo violin on track 2, 'Revelation'
- Terry Noonan – string arrangements

=== Additional personnel ===
- John Burns – engineer, remixing
- Anton Matthews – engineer
- Neil Slaven – liner notes, producer
- David Wedgbury – photography
