= Genesis (The Gods album) =

Studio album by The Gods
- Released: 1968
- Recorded: 1968 at Abbey Road Studios, London
- Genres: Progressive rock, psychedelic rock
- Length: 37:38
- Label: EMI / Columbia Records (UK)
- Producer: David A. Paramor

The Gods chronology
Genesis (1968)	To Samuel a Son (1970)

Professional ratings
Review scores
Source	Rating
Allmusic	2.5/5 stars

Genesis is the debut album by British band the Gods. The LP was recorded in 1968 and released that same year by EMI / Columbia Records) in the UK. It was re-issued on CD by Repertoire Records in 1994.

== Track listing ==
1. "Towards the Skies" (Konas) – 3:25
2. "Candles Getting Shorter" (Konas, Hensley) – 4:28
3. "You're My Life" (Konas, Kerslake) – 3:20
4. "Looking Glass" (Konas, Hensley) – 4:14
5. "Misleading Colours" (Kerslake, Konas) – 3:40
6. "Radio Show" (Robertson, Sugarman) – 3:11
7. "Plastic Horizon" (Robertson, Sugarman) – 3:26
8. "Farthing Man" (Konas) – 3:30
9. "I Never Know" (Konas, Hensley) – 5:41
10. "Time and Eternity" (Konas, Kerslake) – 2:43

=== Bonus tracks on 1994 CD reissue ===
1. "Baby's Rich" (Konas, Hensley) – 2:48
2. "Somewhere in the Street" (Hensley) – 2:50
3. "Hey Bulldog" (Lennon–McCartney) – 3:03
4. "Real Love Guaranteed" (Konas, Hensley) – 2:29

When it came out in 1968, the LP consisted of 10 tracks. The 1994 CD version has an additional four songs. It features both sides of the band's extremely rare 45rpm singles "Baby's Rich" and "Hey Bulldog". The cover of the CD shows the original sleeve artwork which was designed by Hipgnosis.

== Personnel ==
- John Glascock – bass, vocals
- Ken Hensley – guitar, percussion, keyboards, vocals
- Lee Kerslake – drums
- Joe Konas – guitar, vocals

=== Additional personnel ===
- Peter Vince – Engineer
- Mark Brennan – Liner Notes
