= Salisbury (album) =

Studio album by Uriah Heep
- Released: January 1971
- Recorded: October–November 1970
- Studio: Lansdowne (London)
- Genres: Hard rock; progressive rock; heavy metal
- Length: 38:19
- Label: Vertigo
- Producer: Gerry Bron

Uriah Heep chronology
...Very 'Eavy ...Very 'Umble (1970)	Salisbury (1971)	Look at Yourself (1971)

Alternative cover
- US issue

Singles from Salisbury
- 1. "High Priestess" Released: January 1971 (US); 2. "Lady in Black" Released: June 1971

Salisbury is the second studio album by English rock band Uriah Heep, released in January 1971 by Vertigo Records in the UK and Mercury Records in the US. It was produced by Gerry Bron.

Unlike their first album, songwriting credits for fully half of the record were attributed to Ken Hensley alone, as opposed to the debut's collaborative partnership of frontman David Byron and guitarist Mick Box. Soon after the release, drummer Keith Baker (previously of Supertramp) left the band, replaced by Ian Clark (from another Vertigo band, Cressida). With Clark, the band embarked on their first US tour, supporting Three Dog Night and Steppenwolf.

== Musical style ==
Salisbury is skewed toward the progressive rock genre, with its 16-minute title track featuring a 24-piece orchestra and was also significant for Hensley's instant rise to a position as main composer of the group's music.

== Cover art ==
The front cover of the album depicted a British Chieftain tank, which connects to the title, as Salisbury Plain in Wiltshire, England, is a military training area. The original LP release was a gatefold sleeve, with a black-and-white image of the underside of a Chieftain tank on the inside with the turret facing the rear, over which were printed Hensley's comments on each track. Later reissues would be in a single sleeve. The American release on Mercury Records featured a different cover image (an abstract illustration by an unidentified artist of a humanoid figure that appears to have portions of its skin removed), as did the original Canadian pressings. Subsequent Canadian pressings used the UK artwork.

== Release ==
The album was reissued by Bronze Records later in 1971 after the band signed to that label for their third album. Salisbury was remastered and reissued by Castle Communications in 1996 with two bonus tracks, and again in 2003 in an expanded deluxe edition. In 2016, Sanctuary Records released a two-disc deluxe edition.

== Reception ==
Professional ratings
Review scores
Source	Rating
AllMusic	2.5/5 stars
Classic Rock	4/5 stars
Collector's Guide to Heavy Metal	5/10
Record Collector	4/5 stars
Sputnikmusic	4/5 stars

According to AllMusic reviewer, the album perfected Uriah Heep's "blend of heavy metal power and prog rock complexity" and "is too unfocused for the casual listener but offers enough solid songs for the Uriah Heep completist." Canadian journalist Martin Popoff described the album as "a dark downer" and "a failed experiment", imputing the cause of the slip to the "prog rock nightmare" of the title track and to "the hatchet production job". William Pinfold of Record Collector, reviewing the 2016 expanded re-issue, considered Salisbury "a collection notable for tightness, precision and a confident breadth of talent", and praised the band for the album's variety.

One of the album's tracks, "Lady in Black", described as "a stylishly arranged tune that builds from a folk-styled acoustic tune into a throbbing rocker full of ghostly harmonies and crunching guitar riffs", became a hit in Germany upon its re-release in 1977 (earning the band the Radio Luxemburg Lion award).

== Influence of the Album in Popular Culture ==
Public Enemy’s 1989 release, "Fight the Power" samples "Bird of Prey". The extended version of the track "Fight the Power" was featured on Public Enemy's third studio album Fear of a Black Planet (1990).

== Track listings ==
- All songs copyright Dick James Music, Inc. (BMI)

=== UK Release ===
Side one
No.	Title	Writer(s)	Length
1.	"Bird of Prey"	Mick Box, David Byron, Ken Hensley, Paul Newton	4:13
2.	"The Park"	Hensley	5:41
3.	"Time to Live"	Box, Byron, Hensley	4:01
4.	"Lady in Black"	Hensley	4:44

Side two
No.	Title	Writer(s)	Length
5.	"High Priestess"	Hensley	3:42
6.	"Salisbury"	Box, Byron, Hensley	16:20

=== US Release ===
Side one
No.	Title	Writer(s)	Length
1.	"High Priestess"	Hensley	3:39
2.	"The Park"	Hensley	5:38
3.	"Time to Live"	Box, Byron, Hensley	4:02
4.	"Lady in Black"	Hensley	4:43

Side two
No.	Title	Writer(s)	Length
5.	"Simon the Bullet Freak"	Hensley	3:25
6.	"Salisbury"	Box, Byron, Hensley	16:12

1996 remastered CD edition
No.	Title	Writer(s)	Length
1.	"Bird of Prey"	Box, Byron, Hensley, Newton	4:13
2.	"The Park"	Hensley	5:41
3.	"Time to Live"	Box, Byron, Hensley	4:01
4.	"Lady in Black"	Hensley	4:44
5.	"High Priestess"	Hensley	3:42
6.	"Salisbury"	Box, Byron, Hensley	16:20
7.	"Simon the Bullet Freak"	Hensley	3:27
8.	"High Priestess" (single edit)	Hensley	3:13

2003 expanded deluxe CD edition
No.	Title	Writer(s)	Length
1.	"Bird of Prey"	Box, Byron, Hensley, Newton	4:13
2.	"The Park"	Hensley	5:41
3.	"Time to Live"	Box, Byron, Hensley	4:01
4.	"Lady in Black"	Hensley	4:44
5.	"High Priestess"	Hensley	3:42
6.	"Salisbury"	Box, Byron, Hensley	16:20
7.	"Simon the Bullet Freak"	Hensley	3:27
8.	"Here Am I"	Hensley	7:51
9.	"Lady in Black" (single edit)	Hensley	3:34
10.	"High Priestess" (single edit)	Hensley	3:39
11.	"Salisbury" (single edit)	Box, Byron, Hensley	4:23
12.	"The Park" (alternate version)	Hensley	5:19
13.	"Time to Live" (alternate version)	Box, Byron, Hensley	4:13

2016 expanded deluxe edition disc 2: An Alternate Salisbury (all tracks previously unreleased)
No.	Title	Length
1.	"High Priestess"	3:50
2.	"Time to Live"	4:31
3.	"The Park"	6:00
4.	"Simon the Bullet Freak"	3:48
5.	"Bird of Prey"	4:45
6.	"Here Am I"	8:35
7.	"Lady in Black"	5:18
8.	"Salisbury"	16:26
9.	"Salisbury" (live)	17:34

== Personnel ==
Uriah Heep

- David Byron – lead vocals (except "Lady in Black" and "High Priestess")
- Mick Box – lead guitar, acoustic guitar, backing vocals
- Ken Hensley – organ, piano, Mellotron, slide guitar, acoustic guitar, harpsichord, vibraphone, backing vocals, lead vocals on "Lady in Black" and "High Priestess"
- Paul Newton – bass guitar, backing vocals
- Keith Baker – drums

Additional personnel

- John Fiddy – brass and woodwind arrangement on "Salisbury"

Production

- Gerry Bron – producer
- Peter Gallen – engineer, mixing
- Tom Coyne – mastering

== Charts ==
Chart (1971–72)	Peak position
Australian Albums (Kent Music Report)	19
Finnish Albums (The Official Finnish Charts)	3
German Albums (Offizielle Top 100)	31
Italian Albums (Musica e Dischi)	12
Japanese Albums (Oricon)	47
US Billboard 200	103

Chart (2017)	Peak position
UK Progressive Albums (Official Charts)	16
