= John Glascock =

English musician (1951–1979)

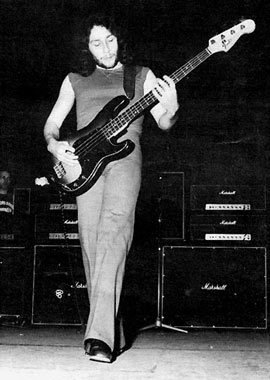
- Glascock rehearsing for Jethro Tull (1976)

Background information
- Born: 2 May 1951; Islington, England
- Died: 17 November 1979 (aged 28) London, England
- Genres: Rock; blues rock; progressive rock; progressive folk; jazz fusion; flamenco
- Occupation: Musician
- Instruments: Bass; guitar; synthesizers; vocals
- Years active: 1962–1979
- Formerly of: Jethro Tull; Toe Fat; Carmen; The Gods; Chicken Shack

John Glascock (2 May 1951 – 17 November 1979) was a British musician. He was the bassist and occasional lead vocalist of the rock band Carmen from 1972 to 1975; and the bass guitarist for progressive rock band Jethro Tull from 1975 until his death in 1979. Glascock died at the age of 28 as a result of a congenital heart valve defect, which was worsened by an infection caused by an abscessed tooth.

In a September 1978 Guitar Player interview, Ritchie Blackmore said "John Glascock is a brilliant bass player, the best in the business in rock."

== Early career ==
The first band John Glascock played in was The Juniors (1962–1964). He played with The Gods (early 1965 – June 1967, September 1967 – February 1969) where, together with future Uriah Heep members Ken Hensley and Lee Kerslake, he recorded the album Genesis. After briefly playing with Head Machine (1970), he joined Toe Fat (June 1969 – December 1970), working with Hensley and Kerslake. In Chicken Shack (January 1971 – March 1972) Glascock played on the album Imagination Lady. His brother Brian Glascock played drums in The Juniors and Toe Fat.

== Carmen ==
Glascock joined Carmen in 1973 and played bass guitar, sang backup vocals and occasionally played synthesizers. Glascock's basslines in Carmen were often technical and unusual and were an important part of Carmen's distinctive sound. Unlike his later work in Jethro Tull, in Carmen he used effects, such as a fuzz pedal in the song "Viva Mi Sevilla".

He had one writing credit on Carmen's first album, Fandangos in Space (1973), for the short track "Retirando", which he shared with the rest of the band. His songwriting had expanded greatly by the time of the second album, Dancing on a Cold Wind (1974), and he had writing credits for three songs: "Viva Mi Sevilla" and "Remembrances", which he shared with the rest of the band, and "Purple Flowers", which he shared with Roberto Amaral. On this album he sang lead vocals on "The City", "Dancing on a Cold Wind", sharing lead vocals with David Allen, and "The Horseman", where he shared vocal credits with the rest of the band. On Carmen's third and final album, The Gypsies (1975), he was credited as sole writer of "High Time" and sang lead vocals; and he shared a writing credit with the rest of the band on the instrumental track "Margarita".

== Jethro Tull ==
Glascock joined Jethro Tull in 1975, after meeting Ian Anderson when Carmen opened several dates for Jethro Tull on the War Child tour. Tull's guitarist, Martin Barre, said in the "Classic Artists Series" documentary that Glascock's love for the band was unique, in that he was a fan of Jethro Tull who became a member of the band. He replaced Anderson's longtime friend, bassist Jeffrey Hammond. Glascock played on the Jethro Tull albums Too Old to Rock 'n' Roll: Too Young to Die! (1976), Songs from the Wood (1977), Heavy Horses (1978), Bursting Out (1978), and on three tracks on Stormwatch (1979). He received no writing credits in Jethro Tull, but sang backing vocals and became the band's first harmony vocalist. He also played electric guitar on stage when Anderson's arrangement required it, as in performances of "Skating Away on the Thin Ice of the New Day" on the Bursting Out live album, in which the rest of the band also played other instruments.

Glascock's health problems became apparent when he was unable to complete the 1978 US leg of the Heavy Horses tour, missing a transatlantic simulcast from Madison Square Garden. He played his last concert with Jethro Tull on 1 May 1979, in San Antonio, Texas, three years to the day after his first concert with the band. Despite a diagnosis of heart valve damage caused by an infection, he continued his previous lifestyle, which involved heavy drinking, marijuana usage and wild parties, and his health continued to deteriorate. Anderson gave him several warnings before laying him off with pay during the production of Stormwatch (1979) and completing most of the bass guitar parts himself. He learned of Glascock's death in November 1979 during the US Stormwatch tour, with replacement bass player Dave Pegg, and had to break the news to the rest of the band. Glascock's close friend, drummer Barriemore Barlow, was devastated and left the band at the end of the tour.

The resulting dislocation, Anderson's own artistic vision, and a decision from the label, prompted a complete overhaul of the lineup, leaving only Anderson and Martin Barre as full members. Glascock's touring replacement on bass, Dave Pegg, was retained for the band's follow-up album in 1980 and remained with the group until 1995.

== Personal life ==
John Glascock had a relationship with bandmate Angela Allen while in Carmen and for some time afterwards. Glascock was well liked by his Jethro Tull bandmates and had a particularly close relationship with drummer Barriemore Barlow. Barlow paid for Glascock's funeral as Glascock had died with almost no money, having made what Barlow considered a "terrible contract" with Ian Anderson, one of the reasons for Barlow's eventual departure.

== Discography ==
=== With The Gods ===
- Genesis (1968)
- To Samuel A Son (1969)

=== With Head Machine ===
- Orgasm (1970)

=== With Toe Fat ===
- Toe Fat (1970) - erroneously credited to John Konas
- Toe Fat Two (1970) - erroneously credited to John Konas

=== With Chicken Shack ===
- Imagination Lady (1972)

=== With Carmen ===
- Fandangos in Space (1973)
- Dancing on a Cold Wind (1974)
- The Gypsies (1975)

=== With Maddy Prior ===
- Woman in the Wings (1978)

=== With Richard Digance ===
- Commercial Road (1979)

=== With Jethro Tull ===
- Too Old to Rock 'n' Roll: Too Young to Die! (1976)
- Songs from the Wood (1977)
- Heavy Horses (1978)
- Bursting Out (Live album, 1978)
- Stormwatch (1979)
