= 40 Blue Fingers, Freshly Packed and Ready to Serve =

Studio album by Chicken Shack
- Released: June 1968
- Recorded: 5–7 February 1968
- Studio: CBS Studios, London
- Genre: Blues rock
- Length: 36:50
- Label: Blue Horizon
- Producer: Mike Vernon

Chicken Shack chronology
40 Blue Fingers, Freshly Packed and Ready to Serve (1968)	O.K. Ken? (1969)

40 Blue Fingers, Freshly Packed and Ready to Serve is the debut studio album by the blues band Chicken Shack, released in 1968. The album reached number 12 in the UK Albums Chart.

This album has three Freddy King covers; "Lonesome Whistle Blues" (written by Rudolph Toombs), "See See Baby" from Freddy King Sings; and "San-Ho-Zay" from Let's Hide Away and Dance Away.

== Background ==
Chicken Shack's first single "It's Okay With Me Baby / When My Left Eye Jumps" (BH 57–3135), was released in 1968 shortly before their first LP release 40 Blue Fingers, Freshly Packed and Ready to Serve was released later that year. Christine Perfect composed and sang the song on side A of the first single and Stan Webb composed and sang the song on the flip side. Neither side of the first single was included on the first LP release. The first non-album single and the debut LP attracted a lot of attention. 40 Blue Fingers... ended up having considerable chart success (No. 12 on the British Album Charts).

Stan Webb and Christine Perfect both wrote two songs for the album and the rest of the songs were blues covers. Webb sang lead vocals on all of his compositions as well as all of the covers. Perfect sang lead only on her compositions.

The entire album and the rest of the Chicken Shack sessions on Blue Horizon were made available on the CD compilation Chicken Shack – The Complete Blue Horizon Sessions in 2007.

== Track listing ==
Side one
No.	Title	Writer(s)	Length
1.	"The Letter"	Jules Taub, B. B. King	4:25
2.	"Lonesome Whistle Blues"	Rudolph Toombs	3:02
3.	"When the Train Comes Back"	Christine Perfect	3:32
4.	"San-Ho-Zay"	Freddie King, Sonny Thompson	3:02
5.	"King of the World"	John Lee Hooker	4:59

Side two
No.	Title	Writer(s)	Length
1.	"See See Baby"	Freddie King, Sonny Thompson	2:22
2.	"First Time I Met the Blues"	Eurreal Montgomery	6:24
3.	"Webbed Feet"	Stan Webb	2:53
4.	"You Ain't No Good"	Perfect	3:35
5.	"What You Did Last Night"	Webb	4:36

== Personnel ==
=== Chicken Shack ===
- Stan Webb – guitar, vocals
- Christine Perfect – organ, vocals, piano
- Andy Silvester – bass
- Dave Bidwell – drums

=== Additional personnel ===
- Alan Ellis – trumpet
- Dick Heckstall-Smith – tenor saxophone
- Johnny Almond – alto saxophone

=== Production ===
- Producer – Mike Vernon
- Engineer – Mike Ross
- Studio – CBS
- Photography and design – Terence Ibbott
