= Fandangos in Space =

Studio album by Carmen
- Released: 1973
- Recorded: John Kongo's Studios, Air Studios and EMI Studios
- Genres: Flamenco, progressive rock
- Length: 46:45
- Labels: Regal Zonophone, EMI
- Producer: Tony Visconti

Carmen chronology
Fandangos in Space (1973)	Dancing on a Cold Wind (1974)

Professional ratings
Review scores
Source	Rating
AllMusic	4.5/5 stars
Christgau's Record Guide	E+
Mojo	4/5 stars

Fandangos in Space is the 1973 debut album by flamenco-rock band Carmen.

== Reception ==
Rock critic Ryan Reed has described their music as flamenco prog rock, "In a glammy yelp, the frontman sang tales of bullfights and gypsies, as the music blended Mellotron, rock rhythms, and zapateado footwork into a cosmic headfuck (produced by David Bowie collaborator Tony Visconti)."

== Track listing ==
All tracks are written by David Clark Allen, except where noted.

Side one
No.	Title	Length
1.	"Bulerias: a) "Cante"; b) "Baile"; c) "Reprise""	5:24
2.	"Bullfight" (Roberto Amaral)	4:28
3.	"Stepping Stone" (Roberto Amaral)	2:52
4.	"Sailor Song"	5:13
5.	"Lonely House"	4:07

Side two
No.	Title	Length
1.	"Por Tarantos" (Trad. arr. by David Clark Allen)	1:44
2.	"Looking Outside (My Window): a) "Theme"; b) "Zorongo"; c) "Finale"" (David Allen, Roberto Amaral)	7:20
3.	"Tales of Spain"	5:17
4.	"Retirando" (John Glascock, Paul Fenton, Andrea Allen, Roberto Amaral, David Clark Allen)	2:14
5.	"Fandangos in Space" (Roberto Amaral)	4:33
6.	"Reprise Finale"	3:00

== Personnel ==
Carmen

- David Clark Allen - lead vocals, electric guitar, flamenco guitar
- Roberto Amaral - lead and backing vocals, vibraphone, castanets
- Angela Allen - lead and backing vocals, synthesizer, Mellotron
- John Glascock - backing vocals, bass guitar, bass pedals
- Paul Fenton - drums, percussion

Additional Personnel

- Tony Visconti - producer, engineer
- John Kongos - engineer
- Alan Harris - engineer
- John Kurlander - engineer
- Peter Mew - engineer
- Peter Howe - photography
