= Bird of Prey (Uriah Heep song) =

Song by Uriah Heep

from the album Salisbury and Uriah Heep (US version)
- A-side: "Gypsy"
- Released: 1970
- Recorded: October–November 1970
- Studio: Lansdowne, London
- Genre: Heavy metal
- Length: 4:05
- Label: Bronze; Mercury
- Songwriters: Ken Hensley; David Byron; Mick Box; Paul Newton
- Producer: Gerry Bron

"Bird of Prey" is a song by British rock band Uriah Heep, from the group's US version of their 1970 debut album Very 'Eavy... Very 'Umble (released as Uriah Heep in the United States).

== History ==
The song was written in Richmond, London during the summer of 1969. It was originally released on Uriah Heep, the US version of Very 'Eavy... Very 'Umble. The song was included as a B-side to the band's first ever worldwide single "Gypsy". A re-recorded version of the song would appear on the European version of 1971's album Salisbury. The original 1970 version of the song would later appear on the European 2003 remaster of Very 'Eavy... Very 'Umble. The song is included on most of the band's compilation albums including the first one, 1974's The Best of Uriah Heep.

"Bird of Prey" was used as a concert opener during the band's early years.

== Reception ==
Martin Popoff called it "the band's most raging work of genius, a searing blend of glowing Byron operatics and sinister metal craftsmanship which previewed Heep's progressive metal side splendidly." AllMusic noted that the song features a riff reminiscent of "Gypsy" and a comparable mood with the works of both Deep Purple and David Bowie. Ultimate Classic Rock said the song is "widely recognized today as one of heavy metal’s most spectacular 1970 cornerstones." The song was said to fully establish the band's vocal harmony template which was later cited as influence by bands like The Sweet and Queen.

== In popular culture ==
Public Enemy’s 1989 release, "Fight the Power" samples "Bird of Prey". The extended version of the track "Fight the Power" was featured on Public Enemy's third studio album Fear of a Black Planet (1990).In 2009, the intro to the song (approximately from 8–14 seconds) was sampled by the American rapper Xzibit in his single "Hurt Locker".

== Personnel ==
- Mick Box – lead guitar
- David Byron – lead vocals
- Ken Hensley – organ, mellotron
- Paul Newton – bass guitar, vocals
- Keith Baker – drums
