= ...Very 'Eavy ...Very 'Umble =

Studio album by Uriah Heep
- Released: June 1970
- Recorded: July 1969 – April 1970
- Studio: Lansdowne (London)
- Genres: Hard rock; progressive rock; heavy metal
- Length: 40:07
- Label: Vertigo
- Producer: Gerry Bron

Uriah Heep chronology
...Very 'Eavy ...Very 'Umble (1970)	Salisbury (1971)

Alternative cover
- US issue

Singles from ...Very 'Eavy ...Very 'Umble
- 1. "Gypsy" Released: July 1970; 2. "Wake Up (Set Your Sights)" Released: November 1970 (US)

Professional ratings
Review scores
Source	Rating
AllMusic	3/5 stars
Collector's Guide to Heavy Metal	9/10
Sputnikmusic	4.5/5 stars

...Very 'Eavy ...Very 'Umble is the debut studio album by English rock band Uriah Heep. It is recognised as a foundational album in heavy metal music.

== Release ==
The album was released in June 1970 by Vertigo Records in the UK. The original vinyl release was a gatefold sleeve, featuring frontman David Byron on the front sleeve, almost unrecognisable beneath cobwebs.

It was issued in August 1970 by Mercury Records in the United States as just Uriah Heep with different sleeve artwork (a centipede type monster), and with the track "Bird of Prey" in place of "Lucy Blues". The album was reissued by Bronze Records in 1971 after the band signed to that label.

The album shows the band trying out various genres – a mix of heavy metal and progressive rock – rather than the hard rock that they performed on later albums. Tracks 3 and 8 were recorded as Spice songs prior to the band's renaming as Uriah Heep, and featured Colin Wood, session musician with The Yardbirds, on keyboards. When Ken Hensley joined Spice in early 1970, the tracks were not re-recorded.

== Reception ==
The album was generally panned by the mainstream critical press upon its release, although it has since been acknowledged as an early classic of the heavy metal genre. Canadian music critic Martin Popoff classifies the album as "proto-heavy metal". Rolling Stone magazine's Melissa Mills began her review by saying, "If this group makes it I'll have to commit suicide. From the first note you know you don't want to hear any more."

== Influence of the album in popular culture ==
Public Enemy’s 1989 release, "Fight the Power" samples "Bird of Prey". The extended version of the track "Fight the Power" was featured on Public Enemy's third studio album Fear of a Black Planet (1990).

== Track listings ==
Side one
No.	Title	Writer(s)	Length
1.	"Gypsy"	Mick Box, David Byron	6:37
2.	"Walking in Your Shadow"	Byron, Paul Newton	4:31
3.	"Come Away Melinda"	Fred Hellerman, Fran Minkoff	3:46
4.	"Lucy Blues"	Box, Byron	5:08

Side two
No.	Title	Writer(s)	Length
5.	"Dreammare"	Newton	4:39
6.	"Real Turned On"	Box, Byron, Newton	3:37
7.	"I'll Keep On Trying"	Box, Byron	5:24
8.	"Wake Up (Set Your Sights)"	Box, Byron	6:22

=== US release ===
Side one
No.	Title	Writer(s)	Length
1.	"Gypsy"	Box, Byron	6:37
2.	"Walking in Your Shadow"	Byron, Newton	4:31
3.	"Come Away, Melinda"	Hellerman, Minkoff	3:46
4.	"Bird of Prey"	Box, Byron, Ken Hensley, Newton	4:05

Side two
No.	Title	Writer(s)	Length
5.	"Dreammare"	Newton	4:39
6.	"Real Turned On"	Box, Byron, Newton	3:37
7.	"I'll Keep On Trying"	Box, Byron	5:24
8.	"Wake Up (Set Your Sights)"	Box, Byron	6:22

1996 remastered CD
No.	Title	Writer(s)	Length
1.	"Gypsy"	Box, Byron	6:37
2.	"Walking in Your Shadow"	Byron, Newton	4:31
3.	"Come Away Melinda"	Hellerman, Minkoff	3:46
4.	"Lucy Blues"	Box, Byron	5:08
5.	"Dreammare"	Newton	4:39
6.	"Real Turned On"	Box, Byron, Newton	3:37
7.	"I'll Keep On Trying"	Box, Byron	5:24
8.	"Wake Up (Set Your Sights)"	Box, Byron	6:22
9.	"Gypsy" (single edit)	Box, Byron	2:57
10.	"Come Away, Melinda" (Spice version)	Hellerman, Minkoff	3:42
11.	"Born in a Trunk" (Spice version)	Box, Byron	3:45

This remastered CD added three bonus tracks and extensive liner notes:

- The bonus single edit of "Gypsy" was released for the Best of Uriah Heep (1991 CD) and then remastered for Rarities from the Bronze Age (1995 CD).
- The two other bonus tracks were originally recorded in 1969 by the band Spice, just prior to Ken Hensley joining the band.

2003 expanded deluxe CD
No.	Title	Writer(s)	Length
1.	"Gypsy"	Box, Byron	6:37
2.	"Walking in Your Shadow"	Byron, Newton	4:31
3.	"Come Away, Melinda"	Hellerman, Minkoff	3:46
4.	"Lucy Blues"	Box, Byron	5:08
5.	"Dreammare"	Newton	4:39
6.	"Real Turned On"	Box, Byron, Newton	3:37
7.	"I'll Keep On Trying"	Box, Byron	5:24
8.	"Wake Up (Set Your Sights)"	Box, Byron	6:22
9.	"Bird of Prey"	Box, Byron, Hensley, Newton	4:05
10.	"Born in a Trunk" (Alternate Version)	Box, Byron	4:31
11.	"Come Away, Melinda" (Alternate Version)	Hellerman, Minkoff	4:15
12.	"Gypsy" (Extended Mix)	Box, Byron	7:07
13.	"Wake Up (Set Your Sights)" (Alternate Version)	Box, Byron	6:32
14.	"Born in a Trunk" (Instrumental)	Box, Byron	4:31
15.	"Dreammare" (Live at the BBC)	Newton	3:08
16.	"Gypsy" (Live at the BBC)	Box, Byron	5:15

2016 Sanctuary expanded deluxe edition disc 2: An Alternate ...Very 'Eavy ...Very 'Umble (all tracks previously unreleased)
No.	Title	Length
1.	"Gypsy"	6.57
2.	"Real Turned On"	3:47
3.	"Dreammare"	5:10
4.	"Come Away, Melinda"	4:01
5.	"Born in a Trunk"	4:53
6.	"Wake Up (Set Your Sights)"	6:56
7.	"I'll Keep On Trying"	5:33
8.	"Walking in Your Shadow"	5:11
9.	"Lucy Blues"	5:20
10.	"Born in a Trunk"	4:47
11.	"Magic Lantern"	7:57
12.	"Bird of Prey" (Alternate U.S. Version)	4:06

== Personnel ==
Uriah Heep

- David Byron – lead vocals
- Mick Box – lead guitar, acoustic guitar, backing vocals
- Ken Hensley – organ, slide guitar, mellotron, piano, backing vocals
- Paul Newton – bass guitar, backing vocals
- Alex Napier – drums (except "Lucy Blues", "Dreammare" and "Bird of Prey")
- Ollie Olsson – drums on "Lucy Blues" and "Dreammare"
- Keith Baker – drums on "Bird of Prey"

Additional personnel

- Colin Wood – keyboard on "Come Away Melinda" and "Wake Up (Set Your Sights)"

Production

- Gerry Bron – producer
- Peter Gallen – engineer, mixing
- Peter Olliff – mixing

== Charts ==
Chart (1970–72)	Peak position
Australian Albums (Kent Music Report)	15
Canada Top Albums/CDs (RPM)	84
Finnish Albums (The Official Finnish Charts)	14
German Albums (Offizielle Top 100)	22
Italian Albums (Musica e Dischi)	11
Japanese Albums (Oricon)	41
US Billboard 200	186

Chart (2016)	Peak position
UK Progressive Albums (Official Charts)	23
