= One Way Love (Bert Berns song) =

1963 song by Bert Berns and Jerry Ragovoy

"One Way Love" is a song written by Bert Berns and Jerry Ragovoy under their pseudonyms Bert Russell and Norman Meade. It was first a single for the Drifters, who reached number 56 on the Billboard Hot 100 with their version.

== Background ==
Cash Box described the Drifters' version as "a pulsating, thump-a-beat cha cha opus...that the boys knock out in their very commercial manner."

== Cover versions ==
- The song became a UK top 10 hit for Cliff Bennett and the Rebel Rousers in 1964, reaching number 9.
- The song was covered by the Gamblers in 1965.
- The song was covered by Dexys Midnight Runners in 1980 and appeared on their single "Keep It Part Two (Inferiority Part One)".
