= May Blitz (album) =

Music album by May Blitz

Studio album by May Blitz
- Released: 1970
- Genre: Acid rock; proto-metal
- Length: 42:32
- Label: Vertigo (UK); Paramount (US); Akarma (Reissue)
- Producer: May Blitz

May Blitz chronology
| May Blitz (1970) | The 2nd of May (1971) |

Professional ratings
Review scores
| Source | Rating |
|---|---|
| Allmusic | 4/5 stars |
| Billboard | (favourable) |

May Blitz is the self-titled debut album by British/Canadian power trio May Blitz. It was released in 1970 by Vertigo Records in the UK, and Paramount Records in the US.

== Track listing ==
All songs written and composed by Hudson/Newman/Black
Side one

1. Smoking the Day Away - 8:21
2. I Don't Know - 4:45
3. Dreaming - 6:35

Side two

1. Squeet - 6:51
2. Tomorrow May Come - 4:48
3. Fire Queen - 4:18
4. Virgin Waters - 7:01

== Personnel ==
- James Black — guitars, lead vocals
- Reid Hudson — bass, backing vocals
- Tony Newman — drums, vibes, congas, bongos
- Producer – May Blitz
- Artwork – Tony Benyon
- Engineer – Barry Ainsworth
- Composers – May Blitz
