= Bakerloo (band) =

English heavy blues-rock trio

- Also known as: The Bakerloo Blues Line
- Origin: England
- Genre: Blues-rock
- Years active: 1968–1969
- Label: Harvest Records
- Past members: David "Clem" Clempson; Terry Poole; Keith Baker; John "Poli" Palmer; John Hinch

Bakerloo (previously The Bakerloo Blues Line) were an English heavy blues-rock trio, established by Staffordshire guitarist David "Clem" Clempson, Terry Poole and others in the late 1960s, at the high point of the influence of The Jimi Hendrix Experience and Cream. Although the group was prominent only for around a year (1968–9) and released only one album, it played an important part in the history of the genre, especially in view of its members' subsequent involvement with Colosseum, Humble Pie, May Blitz, Graham Bond, Vinegar Joe, Judas Priest and Uriah Heep.

== History ==
The Bakerloo Blues Line was formed in February 1968 by David "Clem" Clempson and Terry Poole. The band was named after the London Underground's Bakerloo rail line. They worked with several drummers, including John "Poli" Palmer, Bill Ward and John Hinch, before settling with Keith Baker. Under the management of Jim Simpson, they began performing regularly at Henry's Blueshouse in Birmingham and joined Simpson's UK 'Big Bear Ffolly' tour with Earth (the future Black Sabbath), Locomotive and Tea And Symphony. The group appeared as the support act for Led Zeppelin's debut at London's Marquee Club on 18 October 1968.

After simplifying the name to "Bakerloo" the group signed to Harvest Records in mid-1969. Their first release was a single, "Drivin' Bachwards" / "Once Upon a Time" (HAR 5004) that July. The A-side is an arrangement of the J.S. Bach tune Bourrée in E minor. This record appeared just prior to the release of a similar song, "Bourrée", by Jethro Tull, on their second album Stand Up in August 1969.

The single A-side also appeared on their self-titled album in November.

== Bakerloo ==
The album Bakerloo (Harvest SHVL 762) was further promoted by the inclusion of "This Worried Feeling," a slow blues number, on the 1970 Harvest double sampler album Picnic - A Breath of Fresh Air and by sessions for the BBC. The album was produced by Gus Dudgeon. Notable tracks included "Last Blues," a heavy rocker, and the album's closer, "Son of Moonshine", a driving metal blues. Other tracks contained "progressive" classical and jazz elements.

While reviews for the debut LP were favorable, the group itself was in disarray at the end of 1969. By the time the record was released, the Clempson-Poole-Baker lineup had decided to go their separate ways. Clempson initially sought to form a new blues-rock power trio, one that reportedly included drummer Cozy Powell, before electing to replace James Litherland as the guitarist in Colosseum. Poole and Baker also moved on, forming May Blitz with Jamie Black on vocals and guitar, although both departed before the band was signed to Vertigo Records.

Poole later played with several other bands, including Graham Bond and Vinegar Joe, while Baker bounced from Supertramp to Uriah Heep. Clempson would continue to achieve greater fame with Colosseum and, in 1971, as Peter Frampton's replacement in Humble Pie.

== Discography ==
=== Albums ===
All tracks are written by David "Clem" Clempson & Terry Poole except as noted.

Bakerloo released November 1969, Harvest Records SHVL762; reissued 2000, Repertoire Records REP 4358
No.	Title	Writer(s)	Length
1.	"Big Bear Ffolly"		3:55
2.	"Bring It On Home"	Willie Dixon	4:16
3.	"Drivin' Bachwards"	Johann Sebastian Bach, arranged by Clempson/Poole	2:06
4.	"Last Blues"		7:04
5.	"Gang Bang"	Keith Baker	6:15
6.	"This Worried Feeling"		7:03
7.	"Son of Moonshine"		14:52
8.	"Once Upon a Time" (reissue bonus track) (B-side of single HAR 5004)		3:37
9.	"This Worried Feeling (alternate)" (reissue bonus track) (previously unreleased)		5:45

Personnel

- David "Clem" Clempson — guitar, harmonica, harpsichord, piano; vocals on "Bring It On Home" and "This Worried Feeling", slide guitar on "Bring It On Home"
- Terry Poole — bass; vocals on "Last Blues" and "Son of Moonshine"
- Keith Baker — drums
- Jerry Salisbury — trumpet on "Drivin' Bachwards"

=== Singles ===
- "Drivin' Bachwards"/"Once Upon a Time" (1969, Harvest, HAR 5004)
