= The Gods (band) =

1960s British rock group

- Genres: Progressive rock, psychedelic rock
- Years active: 1965–1969
- Labels: EMI, Polydor
- Past members: Ken Hensley; Joe Konas; John Glascock; Mick Taylor; Brian Glascock; Lee Kerslake; Paul Newton; Greg Lake; Alan Shacklock

The Gods were an English rock band founded in 1965. The original band members included guitarist Mick Taylor, drummer Brian Glascock, his brother John on bass, guitarist Joe Konas and keyboardist Ken Hensley. In 1967 Taylor left, while Lee Kerslake joined on drums (replacing Brian Glascock), Paul Newton joined on bass (replacing John Glascock), then Greg Lake joined on bass (replacing Newton). Newton left the same year he joined, Lake left in 1968 (replaced by Glascock again), and Kerslake stayed with the band until 1969.

The band specialized in progressive rock and psychedelic rock and released three studio albums during their time together: Genesis in 1968, To Samuel a Son in 1969, and Orgasm in 1970 (as "Head Machine"). The band broke up in 1970.

Taylor, who left in 1967, joined bands such as John Mayall's Bluesbreakers and the Rolling Stones. Glascock joined Carmen and Jethro Tull. Newton, who left in 1967, Hensley and Kerslake went on to Uriah Heep, and Lake, who left the band in 1968, joined groups including King Crimson and Emerson, Lake & Palmer.

== Career ==
Taylor and the Glascock brothers were schoolmates from Hatfield and had been playing together as The Juniors (or The Strangers), a band they formed in 1962. Also part of this band were Malcolm Collins (vocals) and Alan Shacklock (guitar). They eventually signed with EMI / Columbia Records. Their first 7" single (Columbia DB7339) appeared in 1964 ("There's a Pretty Girl" / "Pocket Size"). In 1965, the line-up changed. The band teamed up with Hensley (organ/vocals) and Konas (guitar/vocals) and changed their name to 'The Gods'.

In 1966, the Gods opened for Cream at the Starlite Ballroom in Wembley, London. A single ("Come On Down to My Boat Baby" / "Garage Man") was recorded in early 1967 on Polydor Records. At this point the line-up included Mick Taylor, Ken Hensley, John Glascock, Brian Glascock and Joe Konas.

In May 1967, Taylor got a call from John Mayall who was looking for a new guitarist to replace Peter Green. When Taylor joined the Bluesbreakers, he left behind a faltering blues band. The band sought to revive their fortunes on the club/college circuit. They relocated to London and secured a residency at The Marquee. Brian Glascock (drums) was replaced by Lee Kerslake. John Glascock (bass) was replaced by Paul Newton in June 1967 and then by Greg Lake. Lake soon left to join King Crimson in mid 1968. The band had to re-group again and John Glascock was asked to return.

With Glascock back in the fold, they recorded a couple of progressive rock albums and a few singles. Of their singles, "Hey! Bulldog", a Beatles track, is their best known, and both sides have been included on the compilation album, The Great British Psychedelic Trip Vol. 3. The band played an amalgam of psychedelia and progressivism. Tracks like "Towards the Skies" and "Time and Eternity" from their 1968 album Genesis are full of heavy ploughing Hammond organ and distorted guitar riffs and Ken Hensley's unique and rather dramatic vocals add a further dimension.

Most of the Gods' material is fairly typical late 1960s pop/rock, epitomised by songs like "Radio Show" and "Yes I Cry". There are shades of Vanilla Fudge on their cover of the West Side Story extract "Maria". On a few tracks like "Candlelight" and "Real Love Guaranteed", there is an inkling of the heavier sound Hensley and Kerslake propagated in their next venture, Uriah Heep.

After recording two albums, Genesis (1968) and To Samuel a Son (1969), they signed with a new record company and formed Toe Fat, which also lasted two years and two albums. In 1970, they published an album under the pseudonym Head Machine, titled Orgasm with Ken Hensley on keys, guitars and vocals, John Glascock on bass, Joe Konas on guitars and Lee Kerslake on drums.

== Personnel ==
- Ken Hensley – organ, guitars, vocals (1965–1969, died 2020)
- Joe Konas – guitars, vocals (1965–1969)
- John Glascock – bass (1965–1967, 1968–1969; died 1979)
- Mick Taylor – guitars (1965–1967)
- Brian Glascock – drums (1965–1967)
- Lee Kerslake – drums (1967–1969; died 2020)
- Greg Lake – bass (1967–1968; died 2016)
- Paul Newton – bass (1967)
- Alan Shacklock – guitars (1969)

== Discography ==
=== Albums ===
- Genesis (October 1968), Columbia SCX 6286, re-issued 1994 on Repertoire Records
- To Samuel a Son (February 1969), Columbia SCX 6372, re-issued 1995 on Repertoire Records
- Orgasm (as Head Machine) (1970), Audio Archives AACD014
- Best of the Gods (compilation CD)

=== Singles ===
- "Come On Down to My Boat Baby" / "Garage Man" (Polydor 56168)
- "Baby's Rich" / "Somewhere in the Street" (Columbia DB 8486)
- "Hey Bulldog" / "Real Love Guaranteed" (Columbia DB 8544)
- "Maria" (from West Side Story) / "Long Time Sad Time Bad Time" (Columbia DB 8572)
