= Toe Fat (album) =

- Uncensored cover used worldwide (except US).

Studio album by Toe Fat
- Released: May 1970
- Length: 38:52
- Label: Parlophone (UK), Rare Earth (US)
- Producer: Jonathan Peel

Toe Fat chronology
Toe Fat (1970)	Toe Fat Two (1970)

Professional ratings
Review scores
Source	Rating
AllMusic	4.5/5 stars

Toe Fat is the debut studio album by the English rock band Toe Fat. It was released in May 1970 on Parlophone in the UK and Rare Earth, a division of Motown Records in the US.

After signing with Rare Earth and Parlophone, the band released their debut single, "Working Nights" b/w "Bad Side of the Moon".

== Cover artwork ==
The cover art consists of four human figures on a beach who have had toes superimposed over their faces. The original release featured a nude woman standing over a crouched man, but the North American release replaced this with a lamb. The cover was designed by cover art group Hipgnosis.

== Track listing ==
All tracks written by Cliff Bennett, unless otherwise noted.

Side one
No.	Title	Writer(s)	Length
1.	"That's My Love for You"	Bennett, Frank Allen, M. Roberts	4:01
2.	"Bad Side of the Moon"	Elton John, Bernie Taupin	3:24
3.	"Nobody"	Beth Beatty, Dick Cooper, Ernie Shelby	6:04
4.	"The Wherefors and the Whys"		3:43
5.	"But I'm Wrong"		4:01

Side two
No.	Title	Writer(s)	Length
6.	"Just Like Me"	Billy Guy, Earl Carroll	4:12
7.	"Just Like All the Rest"		2:31
8.	"I Can't Believe"		3:59
9.	"Working Nights"		2:31
10.	"You Tried to Take It All"		4:26

== Personnel ==
Adapted from liner notes:

- Cliff Bennett – lead vocals, piano
- Ken Hensley – guitar, organ, piano, vocals
- John Glascock – bass, vocals - erroneously credited to John Konas
- Lee Kerslake – drums, vocals

Additional personnel and production

- Mox Gowland - flute, harmonica
- Peter Mew - engineer
- Jonathan Peel - producer
