= Cliff Bennett (footballer) =

Australian rules footballer

Personal information
- Full name: Clifford Bennett
- Born: 17 March 1884; Yarraville, Victoria
- Died: 25 August 1957 (aged 73); Parkville, Victoria
- Original team: Preston

Playing career^{1}
Years	Club	Games (Goals)
1907	Essendon	3 (0)
- ^{1} Playing statistics correct to the end of 1907.

Clifford Bennett (17 March 1884 – 25 August 1957) was an Australian rules footballer who played with Essendon in the Victorian Football League (VFL).

Bennett applied to enlist to serve in World War I but was rejected as unfit for military service.
