= Dancing on a Cold Wind =

Studio album by Carmen
- Released: 1974
- Genres: Flamenco, progressive rock
- Length: 49:04
- Labels: Regal Zonophone, EMI
- Producer: Tony Visconti

Carmen chronology
Fandangos in Space (1973)	Dancing on a Cold Wind (1974)	The Gypsies (1975)

Professional ratings
Review scores
Source	Rating
AllMusic	3/5 stars

Dancing on a Cold Wind is a 1974 album by flamenco-rock band Carmen. It was later released on a double CD set with the band's previous album, Fandangos in Space.

== Cover art ==
The cover is a mock-up of the logo for Gitanes brand cigarette designed by Ken Hilton of the House of Wizzard design studio.

== Track listing ==
All tracks are written by David Allen, Angela Allen, Roberto Amaral, John Glascock, Paul Fenton, except when noted.

Side one
No.	Title	Length
1.	"Viva Mi Sevilla"	6:03
2.	"I've Been Crying" (David Allen)	5:08
3.	"Drifting Along" (Roberto Amaral)	3:19
4.	"She Flew Across the Room" (David Allen)	3:57
5.	"Purple Flowers" (Roberto Amaral, John Glascock)	6:47

Side two Remembrances (Recuerdos de Espana)
No.	Title	Length
1.	"Table Two For One (Zambra)"	2:15
2.	"She's Changed"	2:57
3.	"Gypsy Girl (Caravan)"	3:15
4.	"The City"	1:36
5.	"Time (She's No Lady)"	1:24
6.	"People Dressed in Black"	4:05
7.	"Dancing on a Cold Wind"	2:11
8.	"The Horseman"	4:01
9.	"Conclusion (She Changed)"	1:54

== Personnel ==
Carmen

- David Allen – vocals, electric guitar, flamenco guitar
- Angela Allen – vocals, synthesizer, Mellotron
- Roberto Amaral – vocals, vibraphone, castanets
- John Glascock – vocals, bass guitar
- David Katz – violin
- Paul Fenton – drums, percussion

Additional Musicians

- Mary Hopkin – backing vocals
- Chris Karan – additional percussion
- Tony Visconti – woodwind and string arrangements
- Danny Thompson – double bass
