= Carmen (band) =

British-American band (1970–1975)

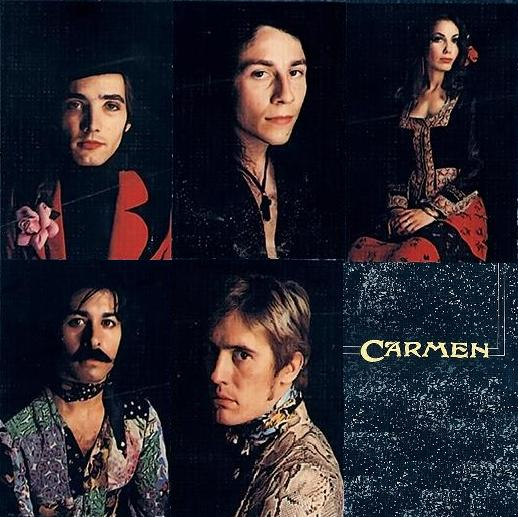
- Carmen as seen on Fandangos in Space. Clockwise: David Clark Allen, John Glascock, Angela Allen, Paul Fenton, Roberto Amaral

Background information
- Origin: Los Angeles, California, U.S.
- Genres: Progressive rock, flamenco rock
- Years active: 1970–1975
- Labels: EMI, Mercury, Angel Air, Cherry Red
- Past members: David Clark Allen; Angela Allen; Brian Glascock; Dennis Trerotola; Adam Moody; Mark Moody; Vicente; Roberto Amaral; Rick Chavez; Mark Anthony; Nigel Griggs; John Glascock; Paul Fenton
- Website: https://www.davidclarkallen.com/carmen-

Carmen was an British-American band active from 1970 to 1975. Their style was a fusion of rock, progressive, and flamenco music and dance. Carmen's first album, Fandangos in Space, is ranked number 46 in the Rolling Stone list of 50 Greatest Prog Rock Albums of All Time.

== History ==
The group was founded by David Clark Allen, a Mexican/American Californian trained in flamenco guitar. Originally a seven-member band in Los Angeles, the band relocated to London, England, in January 1973, where the personnel soon stabilized as a quintet.

In London, they became friendly with several rock stars of the time, including David Bowie - who introduced them internationally by including them on his Midnight Special '1980 Floor Show', Marc Bolan (Paul Fenton became his studio and tour drummer), and Bryan Ferry. Obtaining the services of producer Tony Visconti, Carmen released three albums: Fandangos in Space (1973), Dancing on a Cold Wind (1974), and The Gypsies (1975). By early 1975, the band was enjoying its greatest success, playing as an opening act at concerts by Santana, Blue Öyster Cult, and Electric Light Orchestra, and touring for three months as the opener for Jethro Tull. A series of unfortunate events then occurred while the group was recording The Gypsies at Longview Farm. Paul Fenton seriously damaged his knee, stopping his career as a drummer for many years. Carmen and Tony Visconti ended their musical relationship, and the band's manager left. Carmen disbanded shortly after finishing their last album in 1975 and John Glascock went on to join Jethro Tull.

== Music ==
Carmen's stage performances featured Amaral and Angela Allen dancing on a specially amplified stage floor, so that their flamenco zapateado became an integral percussive addition to the music. Spanish influences in their sound included acoustic guitar interludes in flamenco style, occasional Spanish lyrics, themes of betrayed love reminiscent of Federico García Lorca, and castanets, all supported by a traditional rock rhythm section.

== Discography ==
The first two albums were re-issued by Angel Air records as a 2-CD set in October 2006. Carmen's third album The Gypsies was re-issued by Angel Air records in May 2007, also as a 2-CD set; the second CD, entitled Widescreen, contains new instrumental music by David Clark Allen.

Widescreen - the band David formed with Laurence Elliot-Potter and Charlotte Medcalf - supported The Buena Vista Social Club, Eliades Ochoa, Ojos de Brujo and played for many years regularly on the UK festival circuit.

Carmen's three albums were re-issued again in 2024 by Cherry Red Records as a 3-CD set.

- Fandangos in Space (1973)
- Dancing on a Cold Wind (1974)
- The Gypsies (1975)

== Members ==
- David Clark Allen - lead vocals, acoustic flamenco guitars, electric guitars, synthesiser, mellotron, piano, backing vocals, lyrics (1970-1975) https://www.davidclarkallen.com
- Angela Allen - lead vocals, synthesizer, mellotron, piano, backing vocals, dancer (1970-1975)
- Roberto Amaral - lead and backing vocals, lyrics, dancer (1971-1975)
- John Glascock - bass, bass pedals, synthesisers, lead and backing vocals, lyrics (1972-1975)
- Paul Fenton - drums, percussion, backing vocals (1973-1975)
- Brian Glascock - Drums (1970-1973)
- Dennis Trerotola - lead vocals (1970-1971)
- Adam Moody - guitars (1970-1971)
- Mark Moody - bass (1970-1971)
- Vicente - dancer (1970-1971)
- Rick Chavez - guitars (1971-1972)
- Mark Anthony - guitars, lyrics/music (1970-1972)
- Nigel Griggs - bass (1971-1972)
