= Toe Fat =

English rock band

- Origin: England
- Genre: Progressive rock
- Years active: 1969–1971
- Labels: Parlophone; Rare Earth
- Spinoffs: Uriah Heep
- Past members: Cliff Bennett; Lee Kerslake; Ken Hensley; Joe Konas; John Glascock; Alan Kendall; Brian Glascock

Toe Fat were an English rock band active from June 1969 to 1971, notable for including two future members of Uriah Heep and of Jethro Tull. During their brief existence, they released two full-length studio albums.

== Career ==
Formed in June 1969, the band was fronted by former Rebel Rouser Cliff Bennett and, in the course of its two-year, two-album career, featured lead guitarist and keyboardist Ken Hensley; bassist John Glascock (who replaced original bassist Joe Konas); and drummer Lee Kerslake. After the first album, Kerslake and Hensley were replaced by Brian Glascock (drums) and Alan Kendall (guitar) respectively.

The band was founded by Bennett, a former pop star, after the dissolution of the Cliff Bennett Band. He teamed with the former Gods' keyboard player Hensley, who drafted in fellow ex-Gods' members Kerslake and Glascock. The name was decided over dinner when Bennett and his manager attempted to create the most disgusting band name possible.

Toe Fat was signed to the record label, Rare Earth, in the US. In the UK, the band signed with EMI, who released their first album on the Parlophone label, and the second on Regal Zonophone.

The eponymously titled first album flopped commercially, but gained considerable critical praise. Such was the stir that after their first single, "Workin' Nights", (the B-side was an early Elton John composition "Bad Side of the Moon") they were booked for a tour supporting Derek and the Dominos in the US. The album was also notable for its cover designed by the recently formed graphic art company Hipgnosis. The cover showed a beach scene with four people who have large toes superimposed over their heads. For the US release, a man and a topless woman in the background were replaced by the image of a sheep. The photo of the band on the back of the US album shows Cliff Bennett, Alan Kendall, John Glascock, and Lee Kerslake even though Alan Kendall did not play on the first album. This was an interim line-up, and Lee Kerslake would soon depart also before the second album was recorded.

Hensley quit the band to form Uriah Heep. Alan Kendall replaced Hensley, before their second album, Toe Fat Two. Bennett admitted in the sleeve notes of his Rebellion album that when asked to join Uriah Heep, he "probably should have joined them". Kerslake left to join the National Head Band, before also joining Uriah Heep in 1971. Glascock later joined Jethro Tull. Another ex-Gods man, Brian Glascock, became the new drummer.

Jonathan Peel (not the DJ) produced Toe Fat 2, after hearing them on several BBC radio sessions, including one for Terry Wogan. However, this LP also flopped, despite more radio airplay, and a reasonably successful US tour promoting it. Following these successive failures, their management and labels informed the group that they could no longer fund them.

Bennett recorded Rebellion, before quitting the music industry to become a shipping magnate. He used to occasionally tour with the Rebel Rousers, until returning to music in the 2000s, issuing the album Loud And Clear in 2002, followed by Nearly Retired in 2009.

Alan Kendall and Brian Glascock went on to play with, and write for, the Bee Gees.

== Band members ==
- Cliff Bennett – lead vocals, piano (1969–1971)
- Lee Kerslake – drums, backing vocals (1969–1970; died 2020)
- Ken Hensley – guitars, backing vocals, keyboards (1969–1970; died 2020)
- Joe Konas – bass, backing vocals (1969)
- John Glascock – bass, backing vocals (1969–1971; died 1979)
- Alan Kendall – guitars (1970–1971)
- Brian Glascock – drums, backing vocals (1970–1971)

== Discography ==
=== Studio albums ===
- Toe Fat (1970)
- Toe Fat Two (1970)

=== Singles ===
- Bad Side Of The Moon / Working Nights (1970)
- Brand New Band / Can't Live Without You (1972)
