= Colin Wood =

British musician (born 1943)

Colin Arthur Wood (born 15 June 1943) is a British musician engaged in the field of jazz and rock music.

Wood was born in Camberwell, South East London, & was moved to Somerset in 1950. He played jazz piano while still at school. In 1962 he went to Durham University to study mathematics. In 1965 he moved to London to play with Bill Nile's Delta Jazz Band and with Monty Sunshine (1968). He was also playing on rock sessions with The Yardbirds, David Bowie, Cat Stevens, Kevin Coyne and was the keyboardist on two songs included as part of the debut album of Uriah Heep. Wood, whose other musical talents also include playing the flute, did not, however (although offered the job), become an official member of the band. He lectured in maths for a time while freelancing musically. In September 1977 he joined Acker Bilk and remained with him into the 2000s.

== Discography ==
=== With Uriah Heep ===
- Very 'eavy... Very 'umble (1970)

=== With Siren ===
- Siren

=== With Chris Barber / Kenny Ball / Acker Bilk ===
- The Ultimate
