= Paul Newton (musician) =

English rock musician (born 1948)

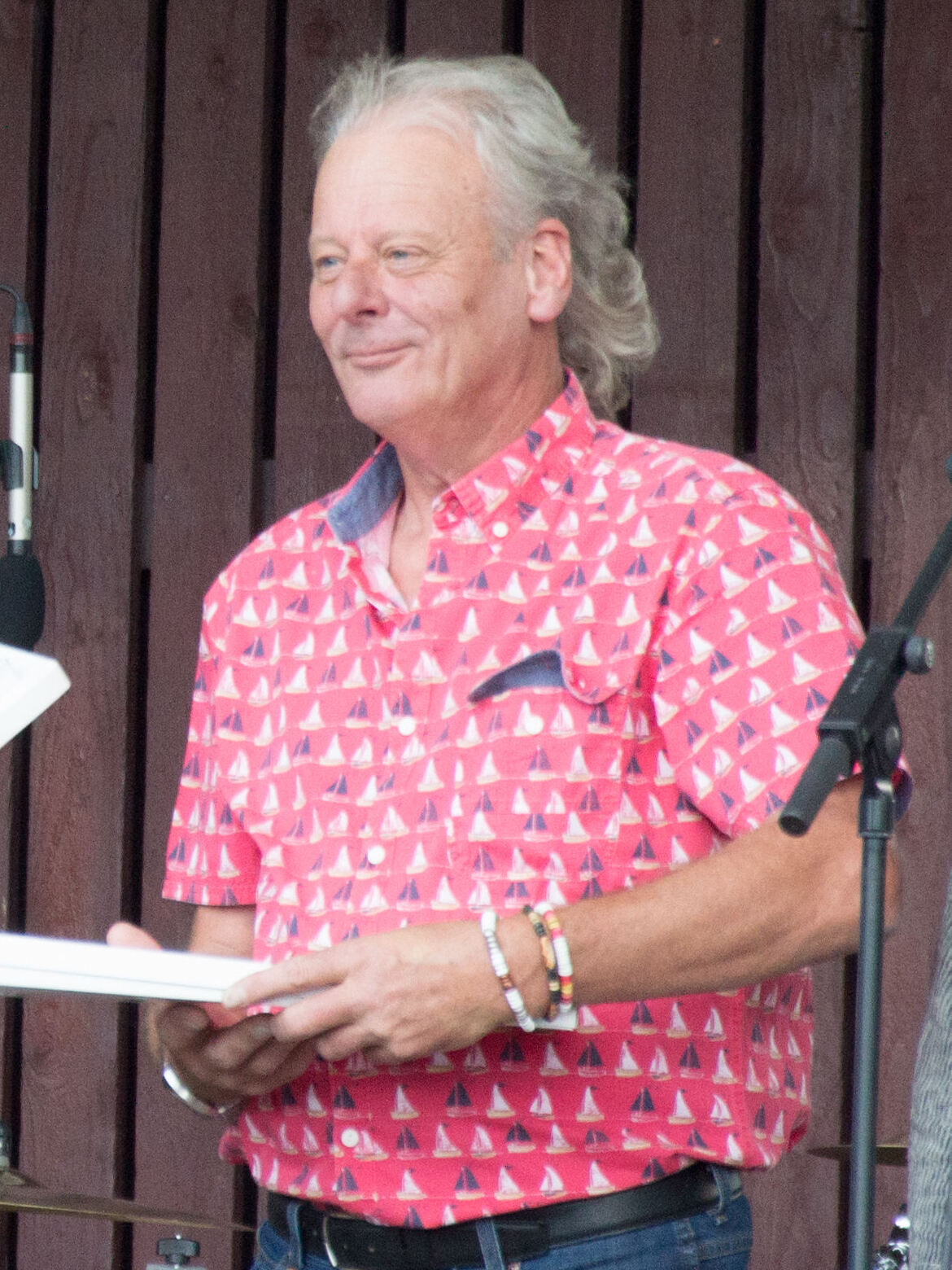
- Newton in 2012.

Background information
- Born: 21 February 1948 (age 78); Andover, Hampshire, England
- Genres: Hard rock; progressive rock
- Instruments: Bass; vocals
- Years active: 1965–present
- Labels: Vertigo, Bronze

Paul Newton (born 21 February 1948) is an English rock musician. He was the original bass player for Uriah Heep, performing on the band's first three studio albums.

== Career ==
He was bassist with progressive group Shinn, which featured organist Don Shinn and drummer Brian "Blinky" Davison, and then joined a reformed line-up of The Gods with Ken Hensley and Lee Kerslake. Newton then played in the band Spice with Mick Box and David Byron, who in 1969 developed into Uriah Heep. He was the bass guitarist for Uriah Heep from 1969 to 1972, and played on the band's first three albums.

More recently he has performed with other ex-members of Uriah Heep (Ken Hensley, John Lawton and Lee Kerslake) in 'Uriah Heep Legend's and was previously a member of The Hensley/Lawton band. He has appeared with 'Behind Closed Doors', a band formed by his son, Julian and works occasionally with Malvern band 'The Ferrets'. He, along with John Lawton guested with 'Uriah Heep' on three songs at the 'Masters of Rock Festival' in the Czech Republic on 11 July 2019, making this the first time he has played with the band since 1971.

== Personal life ==
Newton was born in Andover in 1948. He started playing guitar after he persuaded his father to buy him one.

Paul has lived in Ledbury for the past twenty years and is a member of the local bowling team. He lives with his wife, who had no idea he is a musician. In March 2023 he published his first book 'BoneStructure, A Journey From Boy To Band' a fictional story based on his life through the eyes of an alter-ego. He mentioned that he is working on a second book, intended to be a crime thriller.

== Discography ==
- 1970 – Uriah Heep - Very 'eavy... Very 'umble
- 1971 – Uriah Heep - Salisbury
- 1971 – Uriah Heep - Look at Yourself
- 2001 – With The Hensley Lawton Band - The Return
- 2016 – Chris Rainbow - Licence to Rock
- 2016 – Twisted Tapestry (Bass on some tracks on EP)
