= Keith Baker (musician) =

British drummer (born 1950)

- Born: April 14, 1948 (age 78)
- Instrument: Drums
- Formerly of: Bakerloo, Supertramp, Uriah Heep

Keith William Baker (born 19 April 1948, Sparkbrook, Birmingham) is a drummer. He is best known for being the drummer on the second album by Uriah Heep, Salisbury, and for being the original drummer for Supertramp.

== Career ==
He played for Bakerloo, but left the group following the release of its only album. He subsequently became the first drummer of Supertramp (then called Daddy) between late 1969 and early 1970. After leaving in January 1970, Baker joined Uriah Heep prior to their second album Salisbury, replacing Nigel Olsson. He recorded the album with the group, but left when he did not want to tour extensively with the band and was replaced by Ian Clark.

Baker previously had prostate cancer.

== Discography ==
Year	Artist	Title	Notes
1969	Bakerloo	Bakerloo	
1970	Uriah Heep	Very 'eavy... Very 'umble	One song only: "Bird of Prey"
1971	Uriah Heep	Salisbury	
1972	B.J. Cole	New Hovering Dog	
2003	Carla Rugg	Dynamite	
2016	Dik Cadbury	Wind of Change	
