= Stan Webb (guitarist) =

English musician (born 1946)

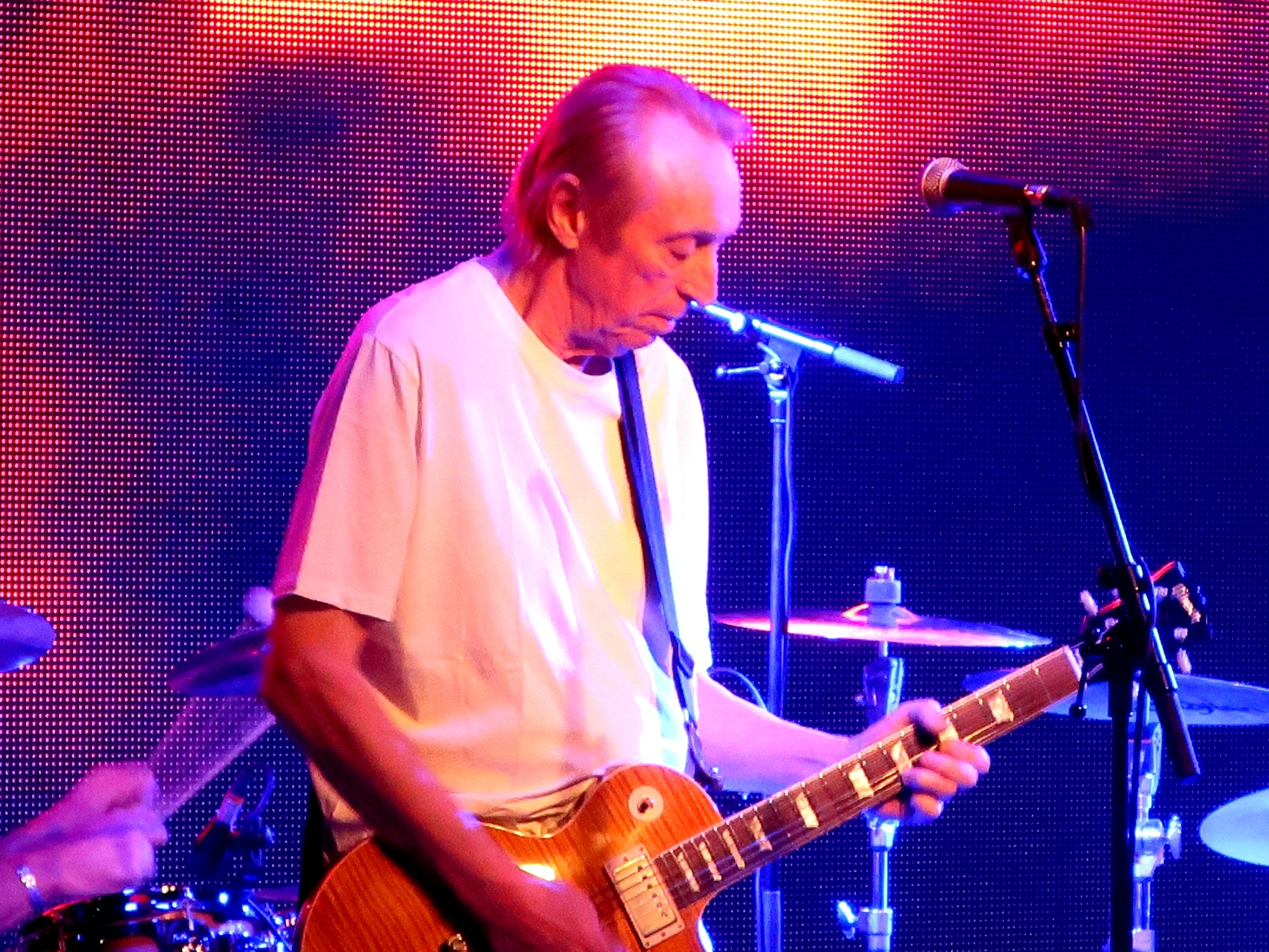
- Webb performing in 2019

Background information
- Born: Stanley Frederick Webb; 3 February 1946 (age 80); Fulham, South West London, England
- Genre: Blues
- Occupation: Guitarist
- Instruments: Guitar; vocals
- Years active: 1965–present
- Member of: Chicken Shack

Stanley Frederick Webb (born 3 February 1946) is an English musician who has been the sole frontman and lead guitarist with the blues band Chicken Shack since 1965.

== Career ==
Webb formed Chicken Shack as a trio in 1965. The band played in Hamburg, Germany, over the next couple of years. They had a top 20 hit in 1969 with a cover of Etta James' "I'd Rather Go Blind". Chicken Shack disbanded in January 1974, and Webb was recruited to join Savoy Brown and performed on their album Boogie Brothers.

Webb reformed Chicken Shack in 1976, and is the band's only constant member (as of 2026); since 1978 the band have released albums and toured under the name "Stan Webb's Chicken Shack".
