= Jinnwoo =

British musician, artist and writer

- Born: Ben Webb; Leicester, England
- Genres: Folk
- Occupations: Songwriter, musician, visual artist, writer
- Instruments: Vocals, guitar, autoharp
- Labels: Cargo Records, GFM Records, Names Records
- Website: Jinnwoo on Facebook

Ben Webb, known by the stage name Jinnwoo, is an English musician, artist, and writer based in Brighton.

== Music career ==
After gigging pubs and clubs for numerous years, Jinnwoo independently released his debut EP Your Baby in 2014, as well as featuring on Kyla La Grange's second studio album Cut Your Teeth. This led to him being listed as one of The Independent's "10 faces to watch for 2015".

He released his first full-length album, Strangers Bring Me No Light, in 2016. The album featured guest appearances from the Kyla La Grange, Georgia Ruth, Alasdair Roberts, Malcolm Middleton, Rachael Dadd, Kamila Thompson, Noah Georgeson, The Earlies, and Hannah Peel. The album received critical acclaim from The Independent and Songwriting magazine.

In July 2016 he performed at the Cambridge Folk Festival. Later that year, he released a live EP, Ozzy Wood. Roisin O'Connor, reviewing it for The Independent, described the recording as "exquisite". He also announced he was working with a new folk collective called Bird in the Belly. They released their debut album The Crowing in March 2018. It was album of week in the Daily Express, who also labelled it "Folk album of the year".

In July 2019 his band Green Ribbons (a collaboration with Frankie Armstrong, Alasdair Roberts and Burd Ellen) released an eponymous album consisting of a capella singing.

On the 23 April 2021, Jinnwoo announced the released of his new single "Milk", via Charlie Andrew's label Square Leg Records. The single was track of the day on Folk Radio UK, and listed as one of the tracks of the week on God Is in the TV.

== Art career ==
Jinnwoo's art and photography has appeared in a range of publications including The Guardian, fRoots, and Beijing Today, and he has produced album covers for artists including The Rails, Kami Thompson and Lisa Knapp.

== Writing ==
Jinnwoo's debut book, Little Hollywood, was published in January 2020. Novelist and critic Dennis Cooper described it as one of his favourite books of the year.

== Discography ==
=== Solo albums ===
Title	Album details
Strangers Bring Me No Light	Released: 2 September 2016; Label: Cargo / GFM
dreamcreatures.	Released: 3 September 2021; Label: Cargo / GFM/ Square Leg

=== Solo EPs ===
Title	Album details
Your Baby EP	Released: 14 June 2014; Self-released
Ozzy Wood EP	Released: 2 September 2016; Label: Cargo / GFM

=== Features and appearances ===
Title	Album details
"Never That Young" – Kyla La Grange ft. Jinnwoo	Cut Your Teeth by Kyla La Grange; Released: 2 June 2014; Label: Sony Music
"Catfish" – LUUDUS ft. Jinnwoo	Catfish/Bella by LUUDUS; Released: 1 September 2017; Label: GunHaver
"Waiting For 'P' to Have a Vision"	Sonic Blooms: Alt-Folk and New Roots Rising; Released: 27 November 2017; Label: Folk and Honey
"How Stands the Glass Around" – Ben Walker ft. Jinnwoo	Echo by Ben Walker; Released: 5 July 2019; Label: Folk Room
"Lily, Rosemary and the Jack of Hearts" – as part of The Rolling Ramshackle Revue	The Rolling Ramshackle Revue; Released: June 2020; Label: Charity Single
"Cats of Coven Lawn" and "Marcy's Guest House" – as songwriter and backing vocalist	The Cats of Coven Lawn by Frankie Armstrong; Released: January 2021; Label: Pirate Jenny

=== Albums with Bird in the Belly ===
Title	Album details	Folk Albums Top 40 UK Albums Chart
The Crowing	Released: 23 March 2018; Label: Proper Music Distribution / GFM	-
Neighbours and Sisters	Released: 18 October 2019; Label: Cargo / GFM	-
After the City	Released: 25 February 2022; Label: Cargo / GFM	36

=== Albums with Green Ribbons ===
Title	Album details
Green Ribbons	Released: July 2019; Label: Matiere Memoire

== Publications ==
=== Picture books ===
Title	Book details
Little Hollywood	Released: January 2020; Publisher: 11:11

=== Novels ===
Title	Book details
POLO	Released: November 2022; Publisher: Expat Press
