= Frankie Armstrong =

- Singing with Lankum, New Year 2019

Background information
- Origin: Hertfordshire, England
- Genres: English folk
- Occupations: Singer social worker voice teacher voice coach workshop leader
- Instrument: singer
- Years active: 1957–present
- Labels: Topic, Harbourtown Records, Fuse Records, Bay Records, Plant Life Records, Fellside Recordings
- Website: http://www.frankiearmstrong.com/

Frankie Armstrong (born 13 January 1941) is an English singer and voice teacher. She has worked as a singer in the folk scene and the women's movement and as a trainer in social and youth work. Her repertoire ranges from traditional ballads to music-hall and contemporary songs, often focusing on the lives of women.

She is a key mover of the natural voice movement and is the president of the natural voice network, and has been a voice coach for theatrical groups, including at the National Theatre for 18 years. Involved with folk and political songs from the 1950s, she has performed and/or recorded with Blowzabella, the Orckestra (with Henry Cow and the Mike Westbrook Brass Band), Ken Hyder's Talisker, John Kirkpatrick, Brian Pearson, Leon Rosselson, Dave Van Ronk and Maddy Prior. She is blind from glaucoma.

== Biography ==
Armstrong was born on 13 January 1941 in Workington, Cumberland. She moved to Hoddesdon, Hertfordshire, as a young child. She began singing in a group with her brother singing Elvis Presley and Little Richard numbers, and in 1957 joined the Stort Valley Skiffle Group which a few years later changed its name to the Ceilidh Singers as its repertoire moved towards folk music. The group founded the Hoddesdon Folk Club.

In 1963 she qualified as a social worker for blind people and began working with Louis Killen and performing solo (Louis Killen's advice led to her developing the harder voice quality for which she is noted.). In 1964, at Killen's suggestion she joined The Critics Group directed by Ewan MacColl and Peggy Seeger. In 1965 she sang at the Edinburgh Festival "Poets in Public", with John Betjeman, Stevie Smith and Ted Hughes. Her first recording, in 1965, was at the invitation of Bert Lloyd who as director of Topic Records was putting together an album of erotic songs with Anne Briggs, released as The Bird in the Bush (12T135, 1966). In 1968 she recorded songs for the radio programme The Blind Set produced by Charles Parker about the treatment of visually impaired people which led to the formation of the Blind Integration Group.

In 1973 she spent several weeks in the US and met Ethel Raim. She was inspired by Raim's Balkan singing workshops and in the mid-1970s pioneered her own workshops developing her own approach to singing with a natural voice. Her conviction that singing is for everyone has underpinned her approach. She was an initiating member of the NVPN – Natural Voice Practitioners' Network, and "The key figure behind the development of the network...".

She was a member of the Feminist Improvising Group (FIG), co-founded in 1977 by vocalist Maggie Nicols, bassoonist Lindsay Cooper, keyboardist Cathy Williams, cellist and bassist Georgina Born, and trumpeter Corinne Liensol. Armstrong collaborated within the accomplished FIG after 1978, and also with free jazz pianist (and partly percussion playing) Irène Schweizer, saxophonist (and film maker) Sally Potter, trombonist and violist Annemarie Roelofs, flutist and saxophonist Angèle Veltmeijer, and saxophonist and guitarist Françoise Dupety.

The accompanying book to the Topic Records 70 year anniversary boxed set Three Score and Ten has a dust jacket picture of Frankie with Louis and The Crafty Maid's Policy from Lovely on the Water is the seventh track on the second CD in the set.

In 2018, she was awarded a Gold Badge Award from the English Folk Dance and Song Society for outstanding contributions to folk music. She wrote and recorded a song for Stick in the Wheel which is included in their second "From Here: English Folk Field Recordings, Volume 2" recording project and joined Lankum on stage at new year in Bristol singing Old Man from over the Sea.

In 2019, Folk Radio UK announced that Frankie had formed a new band called Green Ribbons with Alasdair Roberts, Jinnwoo and Burd Ellen. In July 2019, the band released their self-titled debut album consisting of purely unaccompanied singing through Matiere Memoir Records.

In November 2020, Folk Radio UK announced that Frankie is due to release her 12th studio album 'Cats of Coven Lawn' in January 2021 to mark her 80th birthday. The album was produced by Bird in the Belly member Tom Pyor, and the first single 'Life Lived Well' features Laura Ward (Bird in the Belly, Hickory Signals).

== Discography ==
=== Solo ===
- Lovely on the Water, Topic 12TS 216, LP (1972)
- Out of Love, Hope and Suffering, Bay 206, LP (1973)
- Songs and Ballads, Topic 12TS 273, LP (1975)
- And the Music Plays So Grand, Silence Records SRS4652, LP (1980)
- I Heard a Woman Singing, Flying Fish FF 332, LP (1984)
- Ways of Seeing, Harbourtown Records HAR009 (1990), CD (1996)
- Till the Grass O'ergrew the Corn: A Collection of Traditional Ballads, Fellside FECD116, CD (1997)
- The Garden of Love, Fellside FECD144, CD (1999)
- Encouragement, Fellside FECD208, CD (2008)
- What's She Got To Smile At?: Songs of Brecht, Weill and Eisler., CD (2017)
- Cats of Coven Lawn, GF*M Records/Pirate Jenny Records (2021)

=== Collaborations ===
- The Bird In The Bush, Topic 12T135 (1966)- with A. L. Lloyd and Anne Briggs
- The Female Frolic, Argo DA82 (1968) as a member of The Critics Group
- My Song is My Own: Songs from Women Plane Label TPL 0001 (1980) – with Sandra Kerr, Alison McMorland and Kathy Henderson
- Nuclear Power No Thanks, Plane Label IMP2, LP (1981) – with Roy Bailey, Martin Carthy, Ron Elliott, Howard Evans, Chris Foster, Sandra Kerr, John Kirkpatrick, Alison McMorland, Brian Pearson, Geoff Pearson, Leon Rosselson, & Roger Williams
- Tam Lin, Plant Life PLR 063, LP (1984) – with Brian Pearson, Blowzabella and Jon Gillaspie
- Let No One Deceive You – Songs of Bertolt Brecht Flying Fish CDFLY557 (1989) by Dave Van Ronk, The Red Onion Jazz Band and others.
- The Fair Moon Rejoices, Harbourtown Records HARCD027 (1997) – with Joan Mills, Biddy Wells, Peter Stacey, Ben Lawrence, Geoff Haynes and Darien Pritchard
- Darkest Before the Dawn, Harbourtown Records HARCD 045 (2004)- with Sarah Harman & Shanee Taylor
- 'Green Ribbons', Matiere Memoire Records - with Alasdair Roberts (musician), Jinnwoo, and Burd Ellen.

=== Collections ===
- Poetry and Song 1, LP, Argo DA 50 (1966) - Frankie Armstrong sings The Lark in the Morn
- Poetry and Song 4, LP, Argo DA 53 (1966) - Frankie Armstrong and Sandra Kerr sing Scarborough Fair
- Poetry and Song 5, LP, Argo DA 54 (1966) - Frankie Armstrong sings The Smuggler
- Poetry and Song 9, LP, Argo DA 58 (1967) - Frankie Armstrong sings Higher Germany
- Poetry and Song 10, LP, Argo DA 59 (1967) - Frankie Armstrong sings The Outlandish Knight
- Poetry and Song 12, LP, Argo DA 61 (1967) - Frankie Armstrong sings The Recruited Collier
- The Critics Group The Female Frolic, LP, Argo DA 82 (1968) - with Sandra Kerr and Peggy Seeger
- The Critics Group Waterloo: Peterloo, English Folk Songs and Broadsides 1780-1830, LP, Argo ZFB 68 (1968) - with John Faulkner, Brian Pearson, Denis Turner and Terry Yarnell
- Various Artists, Room for Company: Folk Songs Festive & Sociable, LP, Impact IMP-S 104 (1972)
- Frankie Armstrong, Roy Harris, A.L. Lloyd, Martyn Wyndham-Read, The Valiant Sailor: Songs & Ballads of Nelson's Navy, LP, Topic 12TS232 (1973)
- John Arlott et al., The World of the Countryside, LP, Argo SPA 304 (1973)
- Various Artists, San Diego Folk Festival '74, LP, KPBS Public Broadcasting San Diego KPBS 101 (1974)
- Various Artists, You Got Magic: Fox Hollow Festival 10th Anniversary Album, LP, Biograph BLP 12052, (1975)
- David Jones, Cliff Haslam, Frankie Armstrong, Clive Collins, Here's a Health to the Man and the Maid, LP, Living Folk LFR 103, (1976)
- Various Artists, Sånger och musik från Kvinnokulturfestivalen, LP, Silence SRS 4647, (1977)
- Various Artists, English Folk Field Recordings Volume 2 by Stick In The Wheel, on Bonus CD & download, From Here Records, (2019).

=== Reissues ===
- Lovely on the Water, a reissue of Frankie's first solo LP, with seven additional tracks: five from The Valiant Sailor (Topic 12TS232, 1973) and two from Room For Company (Impact IMPS104, 1972) (FECD 151).
- Ways Of Seeing (solo, duo and group apace women's voices HARCD 009).
- I Heard A Woman Singing, a reissue by Flying Fish Records, USA (CD FF 332) of the 1985 LP.
- The Bird In The Bush, (TSCD 479) with additional material from Louis Killen and Norman Kennedy.

== Books ==
- My Song is My Own, Kathy Henderson, Frankie Armstrong and Sandra Kerr. London: Pluto Press, 1979. One hundred traditional and composed women's songs from the British Isles, with select bibliography and discography. (Associated LP: My Song is My Own: Songs from Women; Plane Label TPL 0001 (1980) – with Sandra Kerr, Alison McMorland and Kathy Henderson)
- Autobiography As Far as the Eye Can Sing, edited by Jenny Pearson, published by Women's Press in 1992 (ISBN 0-7043-4294-4)
- Well Tuned Women: Growing Strong through Voice Work, co-edited with Jenny Pearson, containing essays from leading international women voice trainers and artists, is also published by Women's Press (ISBN 0-7043-4649-4).
- Acting and Singing with Archetypes, Janet B. Rodgers and Frankie Armstrong. Limelight Editions, 2009. Transcripts from a workshop held in 2006 (ISBN 978-0-87910-368-2).

== Book chapters ==
- Freeing Our Singing Voice, in The Vocal Vision: Views on Voice by 24 Leading Teachers, Coaches & Directors Edited by Marion Hampton & Barbara Acker, Applause Theatre & Cinema Books, 1997 (ISBN 1-55783-282-X).
- The Voice is the Muscle of the Soul, in Glancing Fires: An Investigation into Women's Creativity, Edited by Lesley Saunders, The Women's Press Limited, 1987 (ISBN 0-7043-4061-5).
- Some Reflections on the English Folk Revival", Armstrong. F & Pearson, B in History Workshop - A Journal of Socialist Historians, Issue 7 1978.
- Finding our voices, in Voices from Arts for Labour, edited by N. Jackowska, Pluto Press, 1985.

== Literature ==
- Julie Dawn Smith: Playing like a Girl – The queer laughter of the Feminist Improvising Group. In: Daniel Fischlin and Ajay Heble (Editors): The Other Side of Nowhere: Jazz, Improvisation, and Communities in Dialogue. Middletown, Connecticut: Wesleyan University Press in 2004 (ISBN 0-8195-6682-9), p. 224–243.
- Caroline Bithell: A Different Voice, A Different Song: Reclaiming Community through the Natural Voice and World Song. Oxford University Press (2014). ISBN 978-0-19-935455-9.
