= Hickory Signals =

English folk music duo

- Origin: Brighton, England
- Genres: Folk
- Years active: 2014–present
- Labels: GFM Records
- Members: Laura Ward, Adam Ronchetti

Hickory Signals are a Brighton-based folk duo consisting of Laura Ward and Adam Ronchetti. Aside from their work as a duo, they are both full-time members of Brighton folk collective Bird in the Belly.

== History ==
=== Noise of the Waters EP ===
In late 2016 the Hickory Signals independently released their second EP, titled Noise of the Waters. The title of the EP and the lyrics for the lead single were taken from the poem of the same name by James Joyce, and was chosen by the duo as it mirrored their experiences of living on a house boat. The EP was produced by Ian Carter from Stick in the Wheel.

=== Turn to Fray ===
In 2018, the band release their debut album entitled "Turn to Fray" through GFM Records. The Guardian praised the album for its progressive approach to gender politics within the folk genre, and made it Folk Album of the Month

=== With Bird in the Belly ===
In late 2016, folk musician Jinnwoo announced he was working with Hickory Signals in a new folk collective called Bird in the Belly. Bird in the Belly stated their objective as a band was to uncover forgotten or overlooked British songs, stories, and poems, and reintroduce them into the current folk music canon.

== Discography ==
=== EPs ===
Title	Album details
Hickory Signals EP	Released: 2014; Label: None
Noise of the Waters	Released: 2016; Label: None

=== Albums ===
Title	Album details
Turn to Fray	Released: 16 November 2018; Label: Proper Music Distribution / GFM Records
