= Unwired: Acoustic Music from Around the World =

Compilation album by Various artists
- Released: 25 May 1999
- Genre: World, Acoustic
- Length: 75:17
- Label: World Music Network

Full series chronology
The Rough Guide to the Music of Cuba (1998)	Unwired: Acoustic Music from Around the World (1999)	The Rough Guide to the Music of Eastern Europe (1998)

Unwired: Acoustic Music from Around the World is a world music benefit compilation album originally released in 1999, with proceeds going to Amnesty International. Part of the World Music Network Rough Guides series, the release features global acoustic music, from traditional to pop. The compilation was produced by Phil Stanton, co-founder of the World Music Network, along with Amnesty, fRoots, New Internationalist, and NCOS.

Artists featured cover a broad range of countries, hailing from The Americas (Argentina, Colombia, and the US), Asia (India, Japan, and China), Europe (Spain, Finland, and Scotland), and Africa (Cameroon, Zimbabwe, Sudan, Ethiopia, Senegal, Mali, and Cape Verde).

== Critical reception ==
Professional ratings
Review scores
Source	Rating
Allmusic	4/5 stars

Writing for AllMusic, Alex Henderson called the album "unpredictable" as it does not only feature traditional music but global "contemporary, even cutting-edge pop". The record, according to Henderson, was "excellent" and "well worth obtaining".

== Track listing ==
No.	Title	Artist (Country)	Length
1.	"Carnaval"	Manu Dibango & Cuarteto Patria (Cameroon) (Cuba)	5:47
2.	"Cheka Ukama"	Oliver Mtukudzi (Zimbabwe)	5:20
3.	"Azara Al Hay"	Rasha (Sudan)	6:28
4.	"Tizita (Memories)"	Aster Aweke (Ethiopia)	4:48
5.	"Lo Bueno y Lo Malo"	Duquende (Spain)	4:24
6.	"La Casita de Mis Viejos"	Adriana Varela (Argentina)	3:41
7.	"Vuelo en Libélula"	Maximo Jimenez (Colombia)	2:56
8.	"Di Krenitse (The Well)"	The Klezmatics (United States)	4:09
9.	"Yksi Ruusu"	Niekku (Finland)	5:44
10.	"Love"	Hariprasad Chaurasia & Shivkumar Sharma (India)	5:56
11.	"Djam Leelii"	Baaba Maal & Mansour Seck (Senegal)	5:59
12.	"Alla l'Aa Ke"	Toumani Diabaté (Mali)	7:15
13.	"Bia"	Cesária Évora (Cape Verde)	3:10
14.	"Red Ribbon"	Joji Hirota & Guo Yue (Japan) (China)	6:28
15.	"Dawn"	Savourna Stevenson (Scotland)	3:12
