= Alphadi =

Nigerian fashion designer (born June 1957)

- Born: Sidahmed Seidnaly; June 1, 1957 (age 69); Timbuktu, Mali
- Occupation: Fashion Designer

Alphadi (born Sidahmed Seidnaly; 1 June 1957) is a notable Nigerien fashion designer often known as the "Magician of the Desert". He is Mauritanian, from an upper caste lineage, on both his parents' sides. Alphadi was born in Timbuktu, Mali, but moved to his parents' native Niger at a young age.

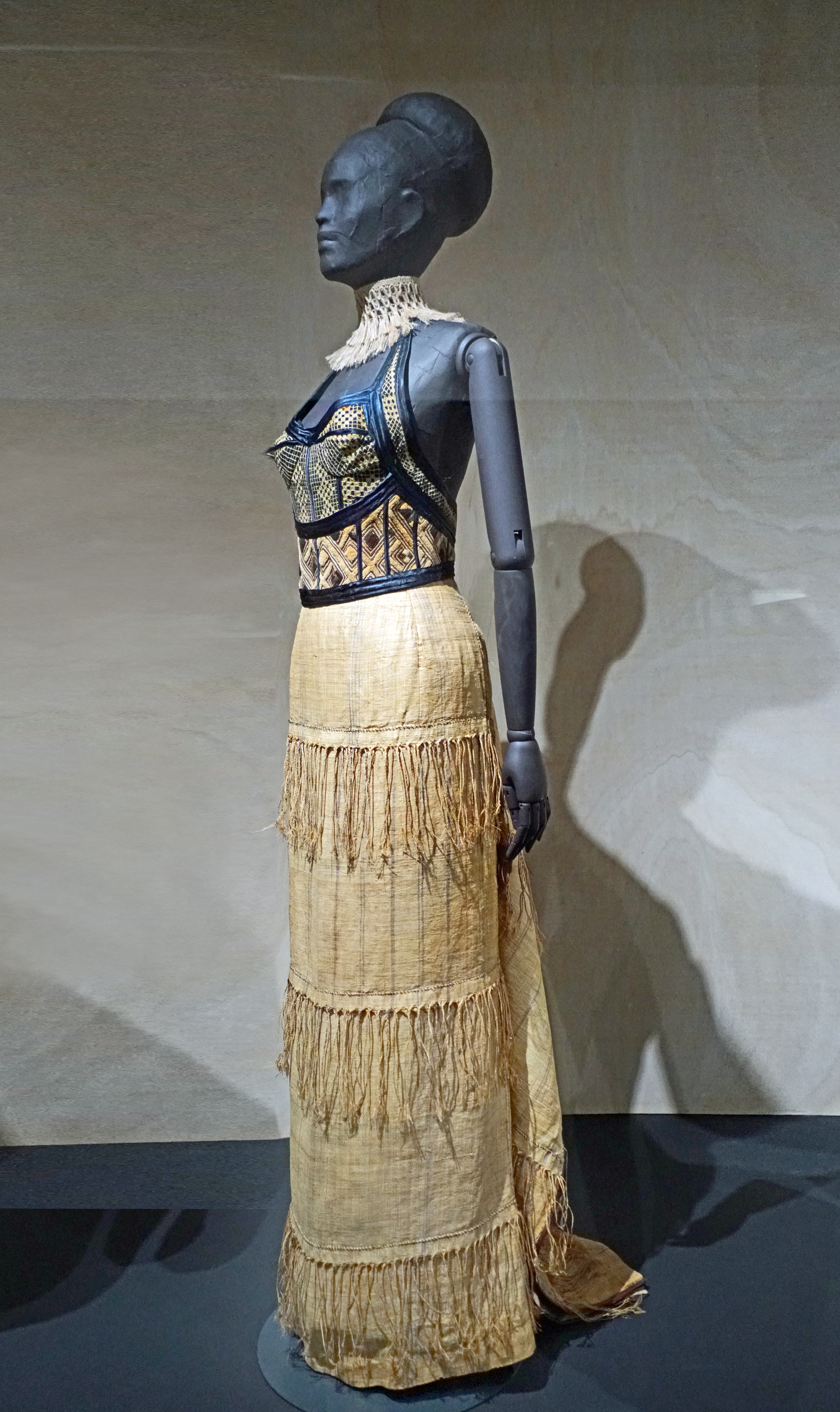

Alphadi studied at Cardon Savard Studios in Paris, started his label in 1984, and his first haute couture line was released in 1985 at the Paris International Tourism Tradeshow. His line has since extended into sportswear and perfume. The Alphadi line, which has 'Complexe Alphadi' boutiques in Niamey (on Rue Vox), Ivory Coast and Paris.

In 1998 Alphadi was one of the three African fashion designers to win the Principal Prince Claus Award; the other two were Tetteh Adzedu from Ghana and Oumou Sy.

In 1998, he created the first FIMA, the International Festival of African Fashion which was located in Niger. This event allowed African designers to come together with other international designers such as Yves Saint Laurent, Kenzo, Jean Paul Gaultier and Paco Rabanne. Since then, the event has been going on every 2 years.

In 2007, he launched a new contest during the FIMA and Hip-Hop FIMA Contest.

Alphadi maintains production facilities in Niamey and Morocco, and splits his time between homes in Niamey and Paris. He is married, a father of six children.

Alphadi was named UNESCO artist for peace in January 2016 and UNESCO Goodwill Ambassador for African innovation and creation in 2022.

== Awards ==
Year	Title
2001	Chevalier de l'Ordre de Mérite de la France
1999	Kora Fashion Award – South Africa
1987	Meilleur Styliste Africain – French Federation of Couture and Prêt à Porter
1997	Principal Prince Claus Award – Prince Claus Fund

== Sources ==
- Alphadi Profile
- Creative Africa – Fashion
- 360° – GÉO (episode, TV5) Alphadi, the prince of haute couture Directed by Roberto Lugones, 2004. Country: Germany / France. Running time : 52'
