= Tetteh Adzedu =

Ghanaian fashion designer

Tetteh Adzedu is a Ghanaian fashion designer. He was born in 1949 in Odumase Krobo.

Adzedu initially learned to be a tailor, and went on with a study in fashion design. In 1978 he graduated at the Ardis School of Fashion Design in Washington, D.C.

He focuses uniquely on preserving and reviving African tunics for men. According to his own qualification, he is a stubborn traditionalist. Tunics from his brand are worn by several African heads of state. For these high class clients, he does not alter the basic designs. In general though, he does experiment with embroideries and applications. Although he sticks to techniques from the haute couture, he is known for not losing the social dimension of clothing.

Next to his fashion brand Adzedu of Shapes, he is committed to promote African fashion in general, as a training in his own fashion school and as a former chairman of the Ghana Fashion Designers Association.

In 1990 Adzedu won the Ghana National Award for Export Achievement. In 1998 he was one of the three African fashion designers to win the Principal Prince Claus Award; the other two were Oumou Sy from Senegal and Alphadi from Mali.

Tetteh Adzedu has 9 children, including Russell Adzedu.
