= Fischlin =

Fischlin is a surname. Notable people with the surname include:

- Daniel Fischlin, English academic
- Mike Fischlin (born 1955), American baseball player

== See also ==
- Fischli
