= Bird in the Belly =

British folk band

- Genre: Folk
- Years active: 2016–present
- Labels: GFM Records, Cargo Records
- Members: Jinnwoo; Laura Ward; Adam Ronchetti; Tom Pryor
- Website: www.birdinthebelly.com

Bird in the Belly is an English folk music collective based in Brighton, consisting of alt-folk musician Jinnwoo (Ben Webb), folk duo Hickory Signals (Laura Ward and Adam Ronchetti), and producer and multi-instrumentalist Tom Pryor.

== History ==
In August 2016, Jinnwoo announced he was working with a new folk collective called Bird in the Belly. Bird in the Belly stated its objective as a band was to uncover forgotten or overlooked British songs, stories, and poems, and reintroduce them into the current folk music canon.

The band released their debut single "Horace in Brighton" in November 2017. The lyrics are based on a poem by Horace Smith, detailing his day trip to Brighton in 1813.

The band's debut album The Crowing was released in March 2018. The album consisted of songs the band had found in archives and libraries, set to contemporary folk music by the band. The Daily Express selected it as "Album of the Week" and described it as "Folk album of the year so far".

Their second album, Neighbours and Sisters, was released in October 2019, preceded by the singles "Robin & Starling" and "New Gate Stone". In addition to songs made from archived lyrics, the album features a song written by Ward detailing myths around beekeeping, and a song written by Jinnwoo which tells the story of James Pratt and John Smith, the last men in England to be executed for sodomy.

In March 2020, "Horace in Brighton" featured as one of Chris Riddell's song choices on BBC Radio 4"s Desert Island Discs.

In November 2020, Folk Radio UK announced that Bird in the Belly member Tom Pryor had produced the forthcoming album Cats of Coven Lawn by Frankie Armstrong. The first single "Life Lived Well" featured band member Laura Ward.

In February 2022, the band released its third full-length album, After the City. The album was the band's first concept album, based on the 1885 post-apocalyptic novel After London by nature writer Richard Jefferies. It took passages from the book directly, creating a backstory to the plot of the novel using broadside ballads, plague poetry, and Lancashire Cotton Famine poetry. Neil Spencer, reviewing for The Guardian, gave the album four out a possible five stars and described it as "(an) album of well-realised ambition". The album was listed at number 4 in Mojo magazine's best folk albums of 2022 list.

== Discography ==
=== Albums ===
Title	Album details	Folk Albums Top 40 UK Albums Chart
The Crowing	Released: 23 March 2018; Label: Proper Music Distribution / GFM	-
Neighbours and Sisters	Released: 18 October 2019; Label: Cargo / GFM	-
After the City	Released: 25 February 2022; Label: Cargo / GFM	36
Only Dogs as Friends	Released: 30 October 2026; Label: GFM, Code 7, Virgin Music Group	

=== EPs ===
Title	EP details
"Coventry Fair EP"	7" Limited run, 300 copies; Released: March 2023; Label: GF*M

=== Features and appearances ===
Title	Album details
"Cats of Coven Lawn"	Backing vocals on Cats of Coven Lawn, Marcy's Guest House and Life Lived Well by Frankie Armstrong; Released: January 2021; Label: Pirate Jenny/GF*M
"Sing Yonder 1"	Recording of Sovay on compilation album; Released: September 2023; Label: Sing Yonder
