= Jack Warshaw =

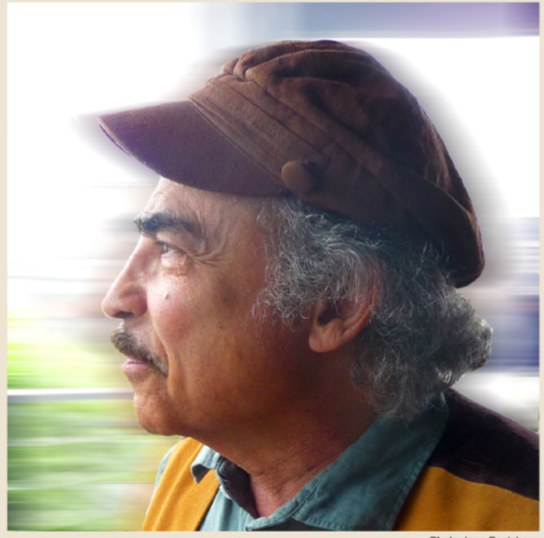

Background information
- Born: 1942 (age 83–84); New York City, New York
- Genre: Folk
- Occupations: folksinger, songwriter, musician, heritage architect, town planner
- Website: http://www.jackwarshaw.com

Jack Warshaw (born 1942) is an American folksinger, songwriter and musician, best known for his 1976 protest song "If They Come in the Morning," aka "No Time for Love." He moved to England in 1965 to start a career as an architect but stayed because the folk music scene and the Vietnam War intervened.

== Early life and career ==
Raised by liberal Jewish parents Jack's artistic and musical ability showed up in childhood. He competed for entry and was accepted at the High School of Music and Art, electing to study architecture. At age 16 he began to attend Greenwich Village folksong sessions, concerts by The Weavers and took up the guitar. Early in his studies at Miami University in Oxford, Ohio, he became intensely engaged with folksongs and singers, strongly influenced by Pete Seeger and The Weavers, Peggy Seeger and Ewan MacColl, The New Lost City Ramblers, Tom Paley, Dave Van Ronk, Doc Watson and the Carter Family. He co-founded the University Folk Club, which held weekly "hootenannies," organized talent shows, festivals and concerts at the University. He formed a trio, the Wanderers, modeled on The Weavers, with Nicholas Bocher and Lynn Sandage, and later a duo with Kathy Davis. The two performed regularly at a variety of venues in Ohio. In 1961/2 he joined other hopefuls like Bob Dylan, Peter Paul and Mary, Judy Collins and many others at New York's Gerdes Folk City sessions run by Brother John Sellers. In 1963 while performing with Davis at legendary The Bitter End in Greenwich Village they were spotted by music agent Peter Paul, who booked them at venues with the then aspiring Jose Feliciano, the Mamas and the Papas and Happy Traum. They were also mentored by Ed McCurdy.

Jack earned a degree in architecture, studying under Professor Rudolf Frankel. He eventually won UK diplomas in town planning and historic building conservation.

In 1966 he joined The Critics Group, the left wing folk/theatre group led by Ewan MacColl and co-founded the Stop it Committee, the UK American Anti-war Group, remaining active in both until the Critics Group split up in 1973 and the Stop it Committee disbanded after US withdrawal from Vietnam in April 1975.

From 1968 to 1972 he worked with BBC Radio Ballad producer Charles Parker (a member of the Critics Group), Peggy Seeger and others, making anti-war radio programmes intended for broadcast to Vietnam GIs. Entitled "Off Limits" the programmes contained specially written songs and interviews with American deserters, critics, contemporary news clips, a Vietnamese girl, survivor of the 1969 My Lai Massacre and an extract from the US television interview by journalist Mike Wallace of Lt. William Calley, who was convicted for ordering the massacre. The US Government had marked him as a fugitive for resisting conscription, refusing to renew his passport. After Jimmy Carter's amnesty in January 1977, his passport was restored.

Between 1966 and 1972/3 he performed with Critics Group members on albums, anti-war concerts and MacColl's Festival of Fools, playing various characters and as a musician. In 1968 he formed a duo with singer/actor Carol Rosenthal who also joined the Critics Group. They toured the UK until 1974. He was active in supporting the Chile Solidarity and Human Rights campaigns after the coup of 1973 Chile coup, writing "We Will Fight" and performing at many benefits alongside Chilean groups such as Karaxu While performing for Chile Human Rights and Chile Solidarity he met his future wife, Jane Foulsham. They married in 1978 and have three children, all working in cultural arts.

He was a resident singer and organizer at MacColl's Singers Club Folk club, 1967–85; West London Folk Club, 1970–75; Knave of Clubs, 1973-82 and Court Sessions, 1980–90. He recorded a solo album in 1979, re-releasing it in 2010, which included the protest song, "If They Come in the Morning," retitled "No Time for Love" by Christy Moore who made it widely popular.

In 1973 with former Critics' Group members, he helped found Combine, a political theatre group, and for several years performed in themed programmes at The Knave of Clubs, Bethnal Green. These included a 1974 multimedia show about Sacco and Vanzetti which he scripted around Woody Guthrie's famous 1951 album for Folkways Records. He also collaborated with Sandra Kerr in performances at schools, songwriting workshops, concerts, political and union events and benefits. Meanwhile, Combine's output culminated in the collectively written Vietnam Victory Show, performed at the ASLEF hall in April 1975 following the liberation of Saigon.

In 1978 he and Kerr recorded an album with South African exile Barry Gilder, made up primarily of Gilder's (now former South African Director of Intelligence) freedom songs and two songs by MacColl and Peggy Seeger. Smuggled into South Africa, it was banned but distributed clandestinely amongst supporters during the ANC's internal struggle against apartheid. Around the same time Jack produced and performed in a series of programmes in the UK and Ireland supported by the US Embassy cultural section. In 1979 he toured Republican venues in Northern Ireland with singer Breege Keenan.

A period of declining interest in folksongs, together with family commitments led him to stop touring until 2009. In the intervening years he continued to sing at benefits and festivals, which included organizing in 1984/5 a concert for his Union branch to support the UK miners' strike (1984-85) and performing at Whitwell Derbyshire colliery village. Meanwhile, he pursued a successful career in historic conservation. Emerging in 2006 after a break of some 15 years, he continues to write and perform a mix of traditional and original songs, teaming up with Texas folk/blues singer/songwriter Stuart Burns in tours of US and UK, issuing two albums together and collaborating on 2 further albums with UK musicians including Tom Paley, Ben Paley, Neil Warren, Dave Botting, Steve Fuller, Dominic Geraghty, and Zoe Warshaw. In 2015 he appeared at the Aldbury Pumphouse festival and Lyme Regis Folk in concert. In 2014 and 2016 he was invited to perform solo concerts in Denmark. His 2018 Album "Misfits Migrants and Murders" includes songs about refugees, the November 2015 Paris attacks and the Grenfell Tower Fire.

Jack married an English social scientist and educator in 1978. They have three children, all working in the arts.

The Australian Union Songs collection includes texts and recordings of Jack Warshaw's social and political compositions

== Songwriting ==
- If They Come in the Morning (1977) (aka No Time for Love) - A condemnation of injustice to political prisoners. Widely known in UK, Ireland and Europe. Covered by several others including Christy Moore and Roy Bailey; translated into other languages.
- Ballad of the Unknown Soldier (1966) with Rod Shearman - Anti-Vietnam War song
- No Room (1966) exploitation of down-and-outs by Chicago slumlord
- The Grape Pickers (1970) - about California Chicano migrant fruit picking workers, covered by Peggy Seeger, ("From Where I Stand", Folkways FW8563).
- The Kent State Massacre (1970) - covered by Barbara Dane, (Paredon Records, 1974).
- We Will Fight (1976) - about the Chile coup of 1973, covered by Roy Bailey and Barry Gilder. Gilder's version became popular amongst ANC activists in exile 1977-90 (Gilder "Songs and Secrets" 2012)
- Long Time Gone - about the Vietnam War and its effect on separated friends
- Hold the Line Again (1975) about the Grunwick strike
- The San Jose Mine (2010) about the Chile San Jose mine disaster
- United 93 (2011) about the 9/11 heroes
- Junk Food Junkie (2010) Government hypocrisy about junk food
- Eco-town Blues bad plans for town expansion
- New York Girl (2012) A love song
- Troubadour (2013) for Pete Seeger
- Shooting of Michael Brown (2014)

=== Song Topics ===
- Vietnam War
- Miner's struggles
- Strikes and trade unions
- Urban affairs and development
- Junk food
- Children
- Love ballads
- Guantanamo prison
- 9/11
- Pete Seeger
- Global surveillance
- Extinction of Earth

=== Discography (Combine Records) ===
- Long Time Gone 1979 and 2010
- Livin' the Dream with SM Burns 2011
- Good Road with SM Burns 2013
- Endangered Species 2015
- Misfits Migrants and Murders 2018
- The Last Tree 2020
