= Bambay Gueej =

Studio album by Cheikh Lô
- Released: 1999; 2000 (International)
- Studio: Xippi
- Label: World Circuit; Nonesuch
- Producer: Nick Gold, Youssou N'Dour

Cheikh Lô chronology
Ne la Thiass (1995)	Bambay Gueej (1999)	Lamp Fall (2005)

Bambay Gueej is an album by the Senegalese musician Cheikh Lô. It was released toward the end of 1999, with an international release in 2000. Lô supported the album with a European tour.

== Production ==
Produced by Nick Gold and Youssou N'Dour, the album was recorded at N'Dour's Studio Xippi, in Dakar, Senegal. Pee Wee Ellis arranged the horn charts; Richard Egües played flute. Oumou Sangaré sang on "Bobo-Dioulasso". Lô was influenced as much by Cuban music as by mbalax.

The title track is about the Senegalese religious figure Amadou Bamba; it roughly translates as "Bamba, Ocean of Peace". The lyrics of many of the songs were inspired by Sufism.

== Critical reception ==
Professional ratings
Review scores
Source	Rating
AllMusic	4.5/5 stars
Robert Christgau	A−
The Encyclopedia of Popular Music	4/5 stars
The Scotsman	4/5 stars
Winston-Salem Journal	4/4 stars

Robert Christgau wrote that "the pan-Africanism never sounds forced on what remains a studio creation even though Lô's band drives every cut." The Guardian called the album "an exercise in easy-going Afro-American funk with Cuban overtones, with the title track echoing that other African James Brown fan, Fela Kuti." The Orange County Register concluded that though Lô's "tunes may be booty-shakingly heavy, they aren't above sweet string flourishes or soft-focus balladry."

The Scotsman noted that "the album is full of happy charms like the bubbling talking drum or the ethereal sidestep in the middle of 'Dawsile'." The Irish Times stated that Bambay Gueej "crosses so many musical boundaries and moods that it is dizzying, and yet Lo's music and singing never sound anything but completely African, but African with confidence and conviction."

AllMusic wrote that "Lo's piercing tenor voice and passionate delivery add keen excitement to the music... It's a delightful dance album made with great honesty."

== Track listing ==
No.	Title	Length
1.	"M'Beddemi"
2.	"Jeunesse Senegal"
3.	"N'Jarinu Garab"
4.	"Bambay Gueej"
5.	"N'Dawsile"
6.	"Africadën"
7.	"Bobo-Dioulasso (feat. Oumou Sangare)"
8.	"N'Dokh"
9.	"Zkir"
