= Stick in the Wheel =

UK musical group

- Origin: London, England
- Genres: Folk
- Years active: 2012–present
- Label: From Here Records
- Members: Nicola Kearey; Ian Carter
- Past members: Rachel Thomas Davies; Fran Foote; Simon Foote; Ellie Wilson; Nigel George Hoyle
- Website: www.stickinthewheel.com

Stick in the Wheel are a band with its origins in working-class East London, England. It consists of vocalist and artist Nicola Kearey and Ian Carter, their producer, arranger and Dobro player. They bring a contemporary approach to folk music with raw minimalism, setting vocals to simple accompaniments and handclaps, along with progressive synths and beats informed by the street music of their heritage.

== History ==
=== Early EPs ===
Stick in the Wheel was formed by Ian Carter, Nicola Kearey and Rachel Thomas Davies, who had previously worked together on other projects including the dubstep group Various. The group recorded their debut EP, EP1, in their kitchens. Davies moved to Wales in 2013, at which point Nicola Kearey took on all the main vocals and Fran Morter was recruited. Their second EP, Cuts, contained four traditional tunes, originally recorded for Radio 2, FATEA and other folk radio shows/compilations, and was released in 2014. The third EP, Bones, was released a few weeks later and featured Ian Carter, Nicola Kearey and Fran Morter with Joolie Wood on violin and additional vocals from Rachel Davies. The CD won fROOTS Editor's Choice Of 2014 for Album of the year and was described as "2014's breath of fresh air". Towards the end of the year the band recorded live sessions for Xfm and BBC6 Music, and at the beginning of 2015 they were nominated for the BBC Radio 2 Folk Awards in two categories: the Horizon Award for Best Emerging Act, and for Best Traditional Song (Bedlam).

=== From Here ===
Their debut album, From Here, was released in September 2015 on their own record label, From Here Records. It features Ewan MacColl's song 'Champion at Keeping Them Rolling', the traditional song The Blacksmith, and Copper Family's Hard Times of Old England alongside new song Me N Becky, a story of the 2011 London riots, looting, remorse and jail. The Guardian Newspaper described it as 'A powerful and original debut'. Bright Young Folk concluded its review with the following "From Here collects songs of and for the downtrodden, with honest, caustic yet poetic lyrics of everyday life that take no prisoners, combined with often sparse but mesmerising music. By positioning traditional selections alongside new material, Stick in the Wheel show that for most people, little has changed over the last few hundred years". The album won the 2015 fRoots Critics Poll For Albums Of The Year for new albums. In 2016 they were nominated for the BBC Radio 2 Folk Awards in two categories: the Horizon Award for Best Group, and for Best Traditional Track (Seven Gypsies).

=== Stick In The Wheel Presents From Here: English Folk Field Recordings ===
As a way of giving something back to the scene that had, if not completely accepted them, at least accommodated them, the group set out to make a collection of live recordings of other musicians immersed in traditional music; what they called a snapshot of English folk music right now. They wanted to capture performances that were immediate and intimate. They recorded across the country in private and personal spaces, in down-time, and between gigs. Often recorded in less than an hour in locations as diverse as a stone cottage in Edale, a London bank vault, a Bristol back room, to a Robin Hood's Bay garden at dusk and a Bedford kitchen. The theme of the project was From Here and each artist's contribution was their response to that theme. They were recorded live, with two stereo mics and no overdubs. Artists involved included Martin Carthy, Eliza Carthy, John Kirkpatrick, Jon Boden and Spiro (band). Caught By The River said: "The idea behind this bountiful record... is so ingenuously ambitious and artfully executed, it feels both like the beginning of a major project of contemporary musicology and plays like a dream open-mic session at the perfect folk club". The project was supported by funding from Arts Council England.

=== Follow Them True ===
Stick in the Wheel's 2017 album was a return to a group format with a thematic album, described by the Guardian as "precision folk with anger, lust and blood ". Nicola Kearey said in an interview that they had the picture for the cover early on, and she wanted to write songs based on the picture. The album is about rituals and cycles, how people are condemned to make the same mistakes of the past. It was recorded over a number of weekends in a warehouse in Basildon, where Simon Foote worked. They recorded in the open plan office and used various rooms as booths and the stairwell for percussion. The exception was the original As I Roved Out which was recorded later; Nicola Kearey sang an improvised vocal referencing many folk song tropes into her phone and Ian Carter built the track around it.

=== This and the Memory of This Mixtape ===
A collection of studio sketches and collaborations Ian Carter and Nicola Kearey recorded mid-2018, this limited cassette and CD was released in Autumn 2018. It features Anna Roberts-Gevalt, Lisa Knapp, Jack Sharp and Laura Smyth and Ted Kemp. The cover art was by David Bray, previous Various collaborator.

=== From Here: English Folk Field Recordings, Volume 2 ===
The second set of field recordings was recorded towards the end of 2018. Including recordings of Richard Dawson, Nancy Kerr, Rachel Unthank, Grace Petrie, June Tabor, Will Pound, Cohen Braithwaite-Kilcoyne, Kathryn Tickell and Belinda Kempster on the main release and Bryony Griffith, Sandra Kerr, Frankie Armstrong on a bonus CD and download. Again recorded with simple equipment it was headlined by the Guardian newspaper as "unvarnished voices fire the form".

=== Against The Loathsome Beyond Mixtape ===
Returning to a duo format, a second mixtape of experiments and collaborations was recorded mid 2019, on cassette and CD. It features guest collaborations with Cinder Well, Jack Sharp and C Joynes.

=== Hold Fast ===
In July 2020 the duo released an animated video for their new single Villon Song from the upcoming album Hold Fast. The lyrics of the song come from W E Henley's 1887 free translation of the 15th Century Francoise Villon's Tout aux tavernes et aux filles into thieves' cant. The album also explores cant songs from Musa Pedestris as well as fragments and maxims from the Exeter Book. Hold Fast - an album of "hope and resistance" - was released in August 2021, with BBC6Music's Marc Riley stating it was "one of the albums of the year", with continued support from Iggy Pop on his BBC6Music show. The band recruited Sian Monaghan and George Hoyle to play drums and bass for their only show of 2020, in December at Hackney's Round Chapel.

=== Tonebeds for Poetry ===
This third mixtape was described by UNCUT magazine as "a remarkable psychogeographic voyage through a thousand years of London culture", with more textural and experimental sounds weaved in with traditional material and urban field recordings from around north and east London. It had two Quietus reviews and was #2 Guardian Contemporary Album of the Year 2021.

=== Perspectives on Tradition ===
In 2019, the duo approached EFDSS with a collaborative research project to explore the national folk arts archive at Cecil Sharp House, asking contemporary musicians Jon1st, Nabihah Iqbal and Olugbenga to explore their relationship with archives and traditional material. Although the project was halted due to Covid, they had enough material to produce a record and following further support from ACE, Perspectives on Tradition was released in 2022, on CD, cassette and digital, accompanied by a booklet detailing the project and research processes. It was voted by the late Colin Irwin as the MOJO Folk Album of the Year 2022.

=== Endurance Soundly Caged ===
Enthused by the live touring band put together in 2020, a mini-album of tracks recorded at Eastcote Studios was released in late 2022, Carter citing the energy of the band and wanting to capture that on tape. It was released on limited transparent vinyl, and the band did a short tour of independent record shops to celebrate its release. Zeroh made an animated video for Robot, a new version of the track originally made as part of the Help The Witch project with Tom Cox.

=== Ruins EP ===
In May 2024, a five track EP was released by the duo, consisting of VIP versions of The Cuckoo and Ruins, plus remixes of Jim Ghedi's "What Will Become of England?", KILA & OKI's "Oroho Raha (Mokor Mokor) (Sleep Sleep)" - both containing new spoken word interjections - and finally closing with JRPJEJ's "Shexex (Chapshe wored)".

=== A Thousand Pokes ===
Released in October 2024, A Thousand Pokes was the first studio album proper since 2020's Hold Fast. Loosely themed as "a satirical celebration of mistakes. A joyous lambasting of everyone and everything that’s wrong in the world, against the real-time backdrop of global uncertainty, corruption and political unrest", the album garnered major reviews in The Wire, Songlines, The Quietus as well as a Marc Riley session on BBC 6 Music, who proclaimed "brilliant, just brilliant".

=== Involvement with The Pogues ===
Kearey and Carter were asked by The Pogues' Spider Stacy to be part of the 40th anniversary concert celebrating The Pogues' debut "Red Roses for Me" at London's Hackney Empire in May 2024. They performed a version of "Dark Streets of London", featuring Bad Seeds Jim Sclavunos and George Vjestica on drums and mandolin, respectively. This concert was repeated in December 2024 at Dublin's 3Arena.

When The Pogues decided to tour "Rum, Sodomy and the Lash" in May 2025, Stick In The Wheel were their first choice for support, as well as performing "Gentleman Soldier" as part of the main show. They supported across eight UK shows, including two at Glasgow Barrowlands.

== Discography ==
=== Singles and EPs ===
- EP1 - (limited edition CDR EP, 29 April 2013)
- Cuts - (limited edition CDR EP, 7 February 2014)
- Bones EP - (download & limited edition of 200 CD, 5 May 2014)
- Common Ground / Hasp VAN280 - (limited edition of 300 7" vinyl, 23 Feb 2015)
- Live EP - (limited edition of 49, CDR EP) Recorded live at Squeezebox Folk in 2015. Rough Trade East instore special.
- From Here: Then to Now - (Newspaper with limited edition digital download - split release with Lynched (now called Lankum), 17 June 2016)
- Tales from St Jude's, Bethnal Green - (limited edition of 300, 7" vinyl + booklet, 2 September 2016)
- From Here: English Folk Field Recordings Live at Café Oto - (limited download single, UK, 8 August 2017)
- Lemady Arise feat. Jack Sharp - (limited edition of 300 7" vinyl, 21 June 2018)
- Ruins EP - (limited edition of 300 CDs and 40 cassettes, 10 May 2024)

=== Albums ===
- From Here - (CD & vinyl album, 25 September 2015)
- From Here: English Folk Field Recordings - (CD & vinyl album - Stick in the Wheel and featured artists, 7 March 2017)
- Follow Them True - (CD & limited edition vinyl album, January 2018)
- This and the Memory of This Mixtape - (CD & limited edition cassette, October 2018)
- English Folk Field Recordings Volume 2 - (CD & vinyl album - various artists, 19 April 2019)
- Against The Loathsome Beyond Mixtape - (CD & limited edition cassette, Nov 2019)
- Hold Fast - (CD & vinyl album, August 2020)
- Tonebeds for Poetry - (CD & limited edition cassette, Sept 2021)
- Endurance Soundly Caged - (CD & limited edition vinyl album, Dec 2022)
- A Thousand Pokes - (CD & limited edition vinyl album, Oct 2024)

=== Compilations ===
- Loughton Folk Club 2013 charity CD. track 'Marrabones' (CD, 24 October 2013)
- fRoots 50 track 'Bedlam' - (download compilation with fR373/374 - Aug/Sept 2014)
- BBC Radio 2 Folk Awards 2015 track 'Bedlam from Bones' - (CD, 22 April 2015)
- fRoots 56 Track 'Roving Blade' (download compilation with fR389 (November 2015))
- BBC Radio 2 Folk Awards 2016 track 'Seven Gypsies from From Here' - (CD, 22 April 2016)
- fRoots 67 Track 'Roving Blade' (download compilation with fR415/416 (Jan/Feb 2018))
- Help The Witch Track 'Robot' (From Here Records compilation) (LP, Jun 2020)

=== Other projects and collaborations ===
- Voiced Sound installation at Bethnal Green Nature Reserve - (7 May – 3 September 2016)
- The Singing Bridge by Claudia Molitor - Track Sweet Thames Flow Softly - (9-25 Sep 2016)
- Musicity London track 'Drift into the Land of Fire' - (Geo-located App and limited 50 copies cassette, December 2017)
