= Djam Leelii =

Studio album by Baaba Maal and Mansour Seck
- Released: 1989
- Recorded: 1984
- Genre: Senegalese music
- Label: Mango

Baaba Maal and Mansour Seck chronology
Djam Leelii (1989)	Wango (1994)

Djam Leelii is the first collaborative studio album by the Senegalese musicians Baaba Maal and Mansour Seck, released in 1989. It was recorded in 1984. A 1998 reissue from Palm Records raised the number of tracks to twelve.

== Critical reception ==
Professional ratings
Review scores
Source	Rating
AllMusic	5/5 stars
Chicago Tribune	4/4 stars
Robert Christgau	A−

The Washington Post wrote: "The album's eight selections range from the entrancing 'Lamtooro' and 'Muudo Hormo', tunes that achieve the spiritual grace and calm that so much New Age music aspires to but seldom delivers, to the more percussive, rhythmically contagious 'Salminanam'." The Chicago Tribune noted that "accessible melodies suggest American folk-blues, ethereal ECM-styled jazz and even modern classical music."

Robert Christgau concluded that, "for postindustrialized listeners, the interplay of recurring guitar patterns and penetrating Afro-Islamic voices adds up to background music with soul." Folk Roots named the album the best of 1989.

J. Poet of AllMusic commented that "two guitars, accented by a bit of African percussion and some tasty electric fills by Aziz Dieng, produce pure magic." The album is included in the book 1001 Albums You Must Hear Before You Die.

== Track listing ==
All tracks by Baaba Maal

1. "Lam Tooro" – 6:40
2. "Loodo" – 6:11
3. "Muudo Hormo" – 6:13
4. "Salminanam" – 4:29
5. "Maacina Tooro" – 5:49
6. "Djam Leelii" – 6:02
7. "Bibbe Leydy" – 6:27
8. "Sehilam" – 6:24
9. "Kettodee" – 4:54 †
10. "Ko Wone Mayo" – 9:29 †
11. "Daande Lenol" – 4:34 †
12. "Taara" – 5:23 †

† The last 4 tracks were absent from the original release.

== Personnel ==
- Baaba Maal, Mansour Seck - vocals, acoustic guitars
- Aziz Dieng - electric guitar
- Mamad Kouyate - kora (harp-lute)
- Jombo Kouyate - balafon (idiophone)
- Papa Dieye - percussion
