= Political Song Network =

The Political Song Network was a British national network of political singers, songwriters, and musicians founded at a meeting in London in October 1986. Founders included Roy Bailey, Pam Bishop, Ros Kane, Sandra Kerr, Angela McKee, John Pole, Leon Rosselson, Janet Russell, Ivan Sears, Bob Wakeling, and Jim Woodland. It produced a quarterly newsletter and various publications.

== Publications ==
- Red and Green Songs
- Songs for the Nineties

== Recordings ==
- Shades of Political Song POKE Records PROD 004
