= Cut Your Teeth (song) =

2014 song by Kyla La Grange

Single by Kyla La Grange

from the album Cut Your Teeth
- Released: 24 January 2014
- Length: 3:14
- Songwriter: Kyla La Grange
- Producers: Jakwob; Kyla La Grange

Kyla La Grange singles chronology
"Vampire Smile" (2012)	"Cut Your Teeth" (2014)	"The Knife" (2014)

Music video
- "Cut Your Teeth" on YouTube

"Cut Your Teeth (Kygo remix)"

Single by Kygo and Kyla La Grange
- Released: 8 August 2014
- Recorded: 2014
- Genre: Tropical house
- Length: 6:39
- Label: Sony
- Songwriter: Kyla La Grange
- Producer: Kygo

Kygo singles chronology
"Younger (Kygo remix)" (2013)	"Cut Your Teeth (Kygo remix)" (2014)	"Firestone" (2014)

Music video
- "Cut Your Teeth (Kygo remix)" on YouTube

"Cut Your Teeth" is a song by British singer Kyla La Grange. It was released as the first single for her second studio album of the same name. A pre-release of the album itself, the song released on 24 January 2014 has charted in a number of European charts, notably in Denmark, Netherlands, Sweden and Switzerland.

== Track listings ==
Digital download
No.	Title	Length
1.	"Cut Your Teeth"	3:16

Digital download – remixes
No.	Title	Length
1.	"Cut Your Teeth (Etherwood remix)"	4:59
2.	"Cut Your Teeth (Hackman remix)"	5:19

Digital download – Kygo remix
No.	Title	Length
1.	"Cut Your Teeth (Kygo remix)"	6:39

Digital download – Kygo radio edit
No.	Title	Length
1.	"Cut Your Teeth (Kygo radio edit)"	3:47

== Charts ==
=== Weekly charts ===
Chart (2014–2015)	Peak position
Denmark (Tracklisten)	12
Netherlands (Dutch Top 40)	19
Netherlands (Single Top 100)	21
Norway (VG-lista)	39
Russia (Tophit)	290
Sweden (Sverigetopplistan)	50
Switzerland (Schweizer Hitparade)	69
US Dance Airplay (Billboard)	13

=== Year-end charts ===
Chart (2014)	Position
Netherlands (Dutch Top 40)	88

== Certifications ==
Region	Certification	Certified units/sales
Denmark (IFPI Danmark)	Platinum	60,000^{^}
Sweden (GLF)	Platinum	40,000^{‡}
United Kingdom (BPI)	Silver	200,000^{‡}
Streaming
Denmark (IFPI Danmark)	Gold	1,300,000^{†}
^{^} Shipments figures based on certification alone.^{‡} Sales+streaming figures based on certification alone.^{†} Streaming-only figures based on certification alone.
