= Cheikh Lô =

Senegalese musician

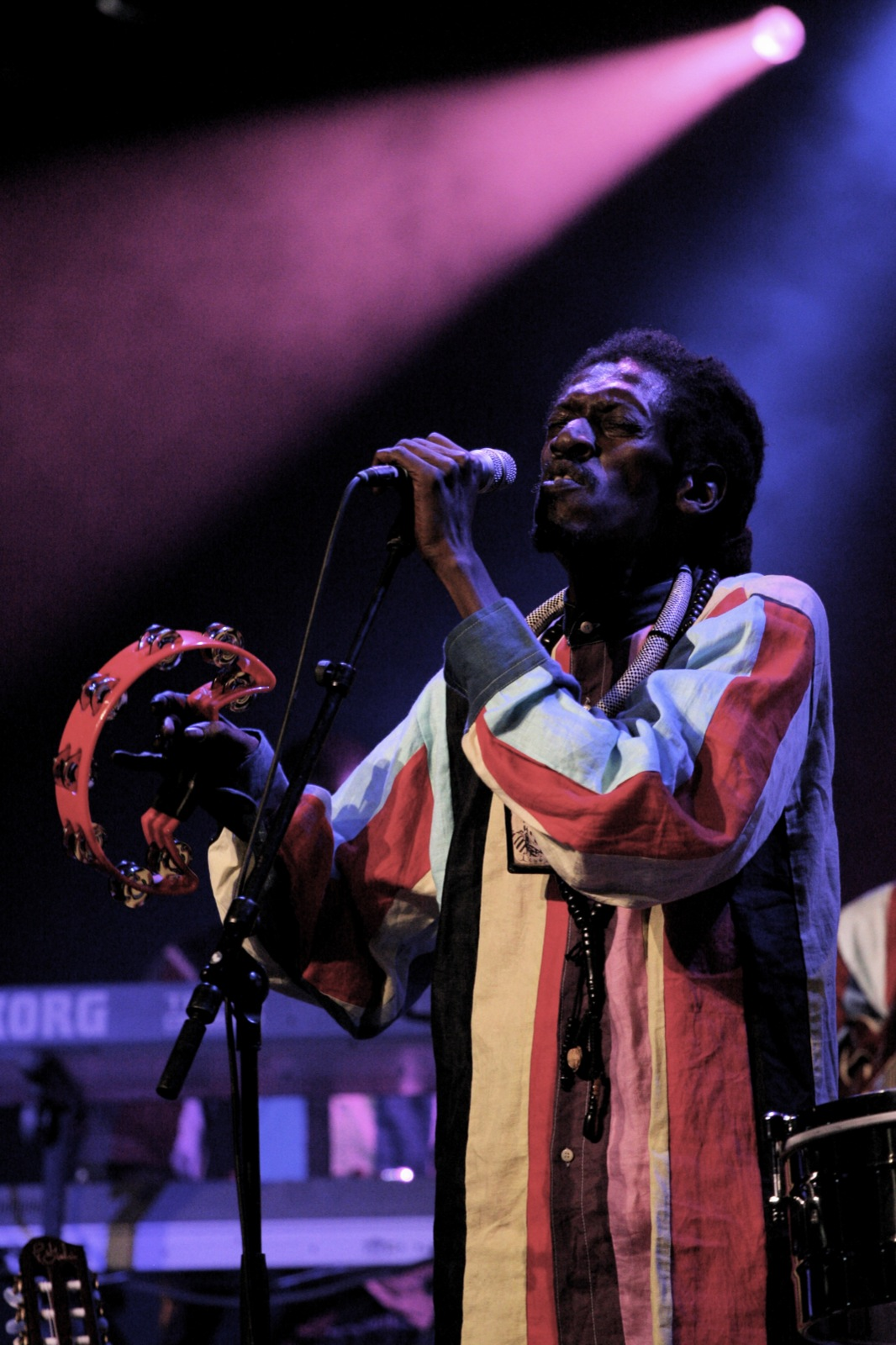
Cheikh N'Digel Lô.

Cheikh N'Digel Lô (born 12 September 1955) is a Senegalese musician.

== Early life ==
He was born to Senegalese parents in Bobo Dioulasso, Burkina Faso, and began playing drums and singing at an early age.

== Career ==
In 1976, he joined Orchestre Volta Jazz, a Bobo variety band that played Cuban and Congolese pop songs, as well as traditional Burkinabé music. Lô moved to Senegal in 1978, performing in several mbalax outfits. By then, the Zairean sound was in full flower, Camerounian makossa was coming on strong, and reggae had entered the mix, and Lô absorbed all of these various musical genres. In 1985, he was playing guitar with numerous Côte d'Ivoire and French musicians, which led him to record material in Paris, France, in 1987. After his band dissolved, Lô remained in Paris as a session musician, developing his own sound, described as a mix of mbalax, reggae and soukous influences. He spent most of his time in recording studios developing his talent. His casual contacts with Zaire's most successful progressive singer, Papa Wemba, were especially memorable. "I was a drummer. So when there was a group who came and didn't have a drummer, I would practice with them. Papa Wemba's drummer was also a businessman, so if he wasn't there, I would help out. He's from the school of Tabu Ley, and when I was young, I listened to Tabu Ley a lot."

In 1995, Youssou N'Dour offered to produce Lô's debut album, Ne La Thiass, which became a global success.

In 2000, Lô sang alongside Ibrahim Ferrer on "Choco's Guajira", from Cuban pianist Rubén González's album Chanchullo.

In 2002, he appeared on two tracks of the Red Hot Organization's tribute album to Fela Kuti, Red Hot and Riot. He collaborated with Les Nubians and Manu Dibango on one of the tracks, "Shakara / Lady (Part Two)."

== Personal life ==
Lô is a member of the Baye Fall, a movement within the Mouride Sufi order of Islam. As such, he has dreadlocks, which is part of the order's customs. The reggae influence in his music, along with his dreadlocks, often leads to the misinterpretation that he is Rastafarian.

== Discography ==
Albums

- Ne La Thiass (1995)
- Bambay Gueej (1999)
- Lamp Fall (2005)
- Jamm (2010)
- Balbalou (2015)
- Maame (2025)

With Rubén González

- Chanchullo (2000)

Contributing artist

- The Rough Guide to the Music of Senegal (2013, World Music Network)

With King'N'Doom

- King'N'Doom feat. Cheikh Lô (2019)
- King'N'Doom Live (2022)
