= Cut Your Teeth =

Studio album by Kyla La Grange
- Released: 2 June 2014
- Recorded: 2013–14
- Genre: Indie; electronica; synthpop
- Label: Epic
- Producer: Kyla La Grange: Jakwob; Jas Shaw; Igor Haefeli; David Pye

Kyla La Grange chronology
Ashes (2011)	Cut Your Teeth (2014)

Singles from Cut Your Teeth
- 1. "Cut Your Teeth" Released: 24 January 2014; 2. "The Knife" Released: 18 April 2014

Professional ratings
Aggregate scores
Source	Rating
Metacritic	68/100
Review scores
Source	Rating
AllMusic	3.5/5 stars
The Line of Best Fit	8/10
musicOMH	3.5/5 stars
DIY	2/5 stars

Cut Your Teeth is the second studio album of singer-songwriter Kyla La Grange after her debut Ashes. It was released on June 2, 2014, and was preceded by an eponymous single "Cut Your Teeth" and a second single "The Knife".

The album explores minimalistic electronica music produced by electronic producer Jakwob.

== Track listing ==
No.	Title	Writer(s)	Producer(s)	Length
1.	"Cut Your Teeth"	Kyla La Grange	La Grange; Jakwob	3:14
2.	"Maia"	La Grange	La Grange; Jakwob	3:02
3.	"Cannibals"	La Grange	La Grange; Jakwob	5:26
4.	"I Don't Hate You"	La Grange	La Grange; Jakwob	3:51
5.	"White Doves"	La Grange	La Grange; Jakwob	3:30
6.	"I'll Call for You"	La Grange	La Grange; Jas Shaw	3:24
7.	"The Knife"	La Grange	La Grange; Jakwob	3:59
8.	"Fly"	La Grange	La Grange; Jakwob	4:22
9.	"Never That Young" (featuring Jinnwoo)	La Grange	La Grange; Jakwob	3:51
10.	"Get It"	La Grange	La Grange; Jakwob	4:02

Deluxe edition bonus tracks
No.	Title	Writer(s)	Producers	Length
11.	"Big Eyes"	La Grange	La Grange; Jas Shaw	4:36
12.	"Make Me Pay"	La Grange	Igor Haefeli	4:12
13.	"Raise the Dead"	La Grange	La Grange; Jakwob	3:43
14.	"Lyssa"	La Grange	David Pye	4:38

== Singles from the album ==
The title track from the album was a pre-release of the album itself and has already charted in Denmark, Netherlands, Sweden and Switzerland

== Charts ==
Chart (2014)	Peak position
Swiss Albums (Schweizer Hitparade)	22
UK Albums (OCC)	93
