= The Rough Guide to the Music of Senegal =

Compilation album by Various artists
- Released: 29 January 2013
- Genre: World, Senegalese
- Length: 130:06
- Label: World Music Network

Full series chronology
The Rough Guide to the Music of Hungary (2012)	The Rough Guide to the Music of Senegal (2013)	The Rough Guide to the Music of China (2012)

The Rough Guide to the Music of Senegal is a world music compilation album originally released in 2013. Part of the World Music Network Rough Guides series, the release presents an overview of the music of Senegal on Disc One, and contains a "bonus" Disc Two highlighting Daby Balde. The album was compiled by Daniel Rosenberg and was produced by Phil Stanton, co-founder of the World Music Network. Daniel Rosenberg and Rachel Jackson wrote the sleeve notes, and Brad Haynes was coordinator and designer.

== Critical reception ==
Professional ratings
Review scores
Source	Rating
Robert Christgau	B+
PopMatters	7/10 stars
AllMusic	3.5/5 stars
Songlines	4/5 stars

The album received generally positive reviews. In his review for AllMusic, Chris Nickson wrote that while the compilation "touches on all the major points", it would have benefited from the inclusion of more emerging artists. This was contradicted by Robert Christgau, who described a "strategy of showcasing winners by (...) longtime crossover hopefuls". Steve Horowitz of PopMatters especially praised the second disc, stating that Balde performs with a "tranquil urgency, a seemingly oxymoronic way of simultaneously compelling one to relax and pay attention."

== Track listing ==
=== Disc One ===
No.	Title	Artist	Length
1.	"Jamm"	Cheikh Lô	4:49
2.	"Ami Kita Bay"	Orchestra Baobab	5:25
3.	"Ndiatigue"	Mansour Seck	5:44
4.	"Amy Jotna"	Sister Fa	4:15
5.	"Bayil [Violin Mix]"	Nuru Kane	4:27
6.	"Weex Bet"	Fallou Dieng	5:04
7.	"Thiely"	Etoile de Dakar & Youssou N'Dour	5:13
8.	"Baydikacce"	Baaba Maal	7:51
9.	"Sey"	Thione Seck & Africando All Stars	5:19
10.	"Soukabe Leydam"	Ousmane Hamady Diop & Mansour Seck	4:49
11.	"Diamono"	Amadou Diagne	3:42
12.	"Senegal-Mali"	Diabel Cissokho	3:20
13.	"Talibé"	Ismaël Lô	4:19

=== Disc Two ===
All tracks on Disc Two are performed by Daby Balde. Balde is a member of the Kolda nobility class who established himself in The Gambia. His music has been described as more "folk-like" than the West African dance music better known to Western ears.

No.	Title	Length
1.	"Mamadiyel"	5:51
2.	"Heli"	5:13
3.	"Kaye Waxma"	5:07
4.	"Tamania"	5:07
5.	"Waino Blues"	4:22
6.	"Sora"	4:36
7.	"Mbadi"	5:10
8.	"Halaname"	5:00
9.	"Fouladou"	5:43
10.	"Douna"	5:44
11.	"Hakurujamane"	4:17
12.	"Mbeugel"	5:38
13.	"Mido Waino"	4:01
