= Morfil Island =

Island in Senegal

Ile à Morfil
- Location within Senegal

Geography
- Location: Senegal River, Doué River
- Coordinates: 16.5835609°N 14.5838357°W

Administration
- Senegal

Morfil Island (French: Ile à Morfil; lit. "Ivory Island") is an island lying between the River Senegal and the Doué River in northern Senegal. The word Morfil is an antiquated French term for raw ivory. It is separate from the mainland for almost 150 km.

Around the 11th century, Morfil was the centre of Tekrur, one of the first Islamic West African states. As such, it was an important centre of trans-Saharan trade. The island later became part of the Ghana Empire, then the Mali Empire, and was finally conquered by the French. The French named the island for the elephants which once roamed the island, but are now locally extinct. The French colonists would use the island for elephant hunting. The main towns on the island are Podor and Saldé.
