= If They Come in the Morning (song) =

"If They Come in the Morning" is the original title of the song better known as "No Time For Love". It was recorded by Moving Hearts for their debut album in 1981. It also has been recorded in 1986 by Christy Moore on his The Spirit of Freedom album. It was written by American singer/songwriter Jack Warshaw in 1976. The title was borrowed from the book of the same title by Angela Davis, rephrasing the closing line of James Baldwin's letter to her of November 19, 1970: "...if they take you in the morning, they will be coming for us that night". From its first line the song attacks unjust law in the forms of "apartheid, internment, conscription, partition and silence..." with references to places prominent in the news at the time: Boston, Chicago, Saigon (now Ho Chi Minh City), Santiago (Chile), Cape Town and Belfast. Warshaw had visited Belfast on a research project and knew fellow Belfast/Derry songwriters The People of No Property whose recording was to be the source of Moore's version. To Moore and Irish opposition to partition and, as they see it, British occupation of Northern Ireland, it was a freedom anthem. Moore varied the song's first line, slipping in "we call it" after "They call it the law..." so that its meaning is unmistakable. He also entered Irish hunger striker Bobby Sands into the fourth stanza after Huey Newton and Bobby Seale in place of "the Panthers," giving the song greater traction through Sands' martyrdom. Warshaw has also updated his original lyrics with names, places and events, which appear in his 2018 album, Misfits Migrants and Murders.

The title can also be referenced back to the provocative poem "First they came..." by Pastor Martin Niemöller (1892–1984):

First they came for the Socialists, and I did not speak out—

Because I was not a Socialist.

Then they came for the Trade Unionists, and I did not speak out—
Because I was not a Trade Unionist.

Then they came for the Jews, and I did not speak out—
Because I was not a Jew.

Then they came for me—and there was no one left to speak for me.

The Christy Moore version was included in two BBC documentaries, Folk Hibernia and Folk Britannia as well as concert videos of Moore and Moving Hearts. Writing in The Irish Times, Frank McNally observed:

...Moving Hearts were the political wing (in some versions, the musical wing) of the Wolfe Tones. Their songs spanned a range of mostly respectable lefty causes, from Jim Page's Hiroshima Nagasaki Russian Roulette to Jackson Browne's environmentalist elegy Before the Deluge. It wasn't all politics, either. One of the stand-out performances at the Stadium was a punk rock/heavy metal version of Nancy Spain. But the real showstopper - the song that earned the standing ovation - was No Time for Love (if they come in the morning).

This too was fairly right on, name-checking an international rollcall of outlaws, from Sacco and Vanzetti to Connolly and Pearse. It was the mention of Bobby Sands that, in 1981, brought the sentiment bang up to date. And just to underline it, Christy Moore ousted "Newton and Seale" from the original lyrics to make room for Patsy O'Hara, the INLA man who also died in the hunger strikes. The song was an all-embracing call to revolution, railing against the "boys in blue" and various other enemies of freedom. But it had a particular message for those not primarily involved in the conflict. "The fish need the sea to survive, just like your comrades need you," sang Christy. "The death squads can only get through to them if first they can get through to you."

You had to take sides in 1981, and neither side was comfortable. I voted for the first time in that year's general election, when the candidates in our constituency included Kieran Doherty, then three weeks into his strike. I hated Margaret Thatcher's intransigence on the prisoner issue. But I also hated the way the hunger strikes were being rammed down our throats and used (or so it seemed) to seek a wider endorsement for the "struggle". Doherty topped the poll and was a TD for the last seven weeks of his life. But he went to his undoubtedly courageous death without my vote.

The original lyrics have been updated by its author Jack Warshaw in his 2018 album "Misfits Migrants and Murders"
