= Podor =

- Town and commune
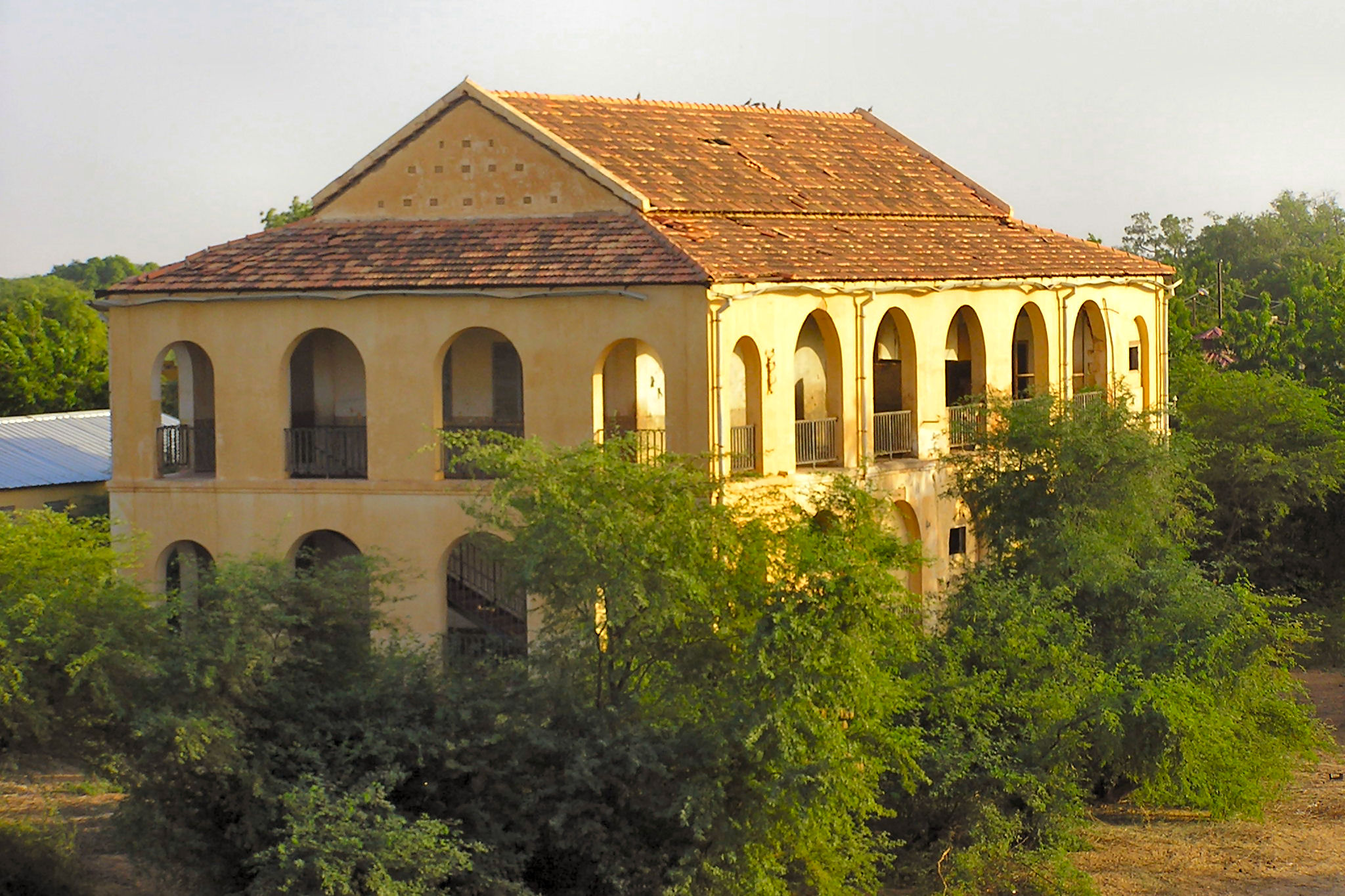
- Fort of Podor

- Location within Senegal
- Coordinates: 16°37′N 15°02′W
- Country: Senegal
- Region: Saint-Louis Region
- Department: Podor

Area
  - Town and commune: 2.038 km^{2} (0.787 sq mi)

Population (2023 census)
  - Town and commune: 12,512
  - Density: 6,139/km^{2} (15,900/sq mi)
- Time zone: UTC+0 (GMT)

Podor (fulbe: Podoor) is the northernmost town in Senegal, lying on Morfil Island between the Sénégal River and Doué River on the border with Mauritania. It was the location of the ancient state Takrur. It is home to a well-preserved French colonial fort, built in 1854 as a centre for gold trading, and is the birthplace of fashion designer Oumou Sy, as well as musicians Baaba Maal and Mansour Seck.

At the 2013 census the population of the town was 11,608. According to the 2023 census, it had grown to 12,512. It is 99% Muslim.

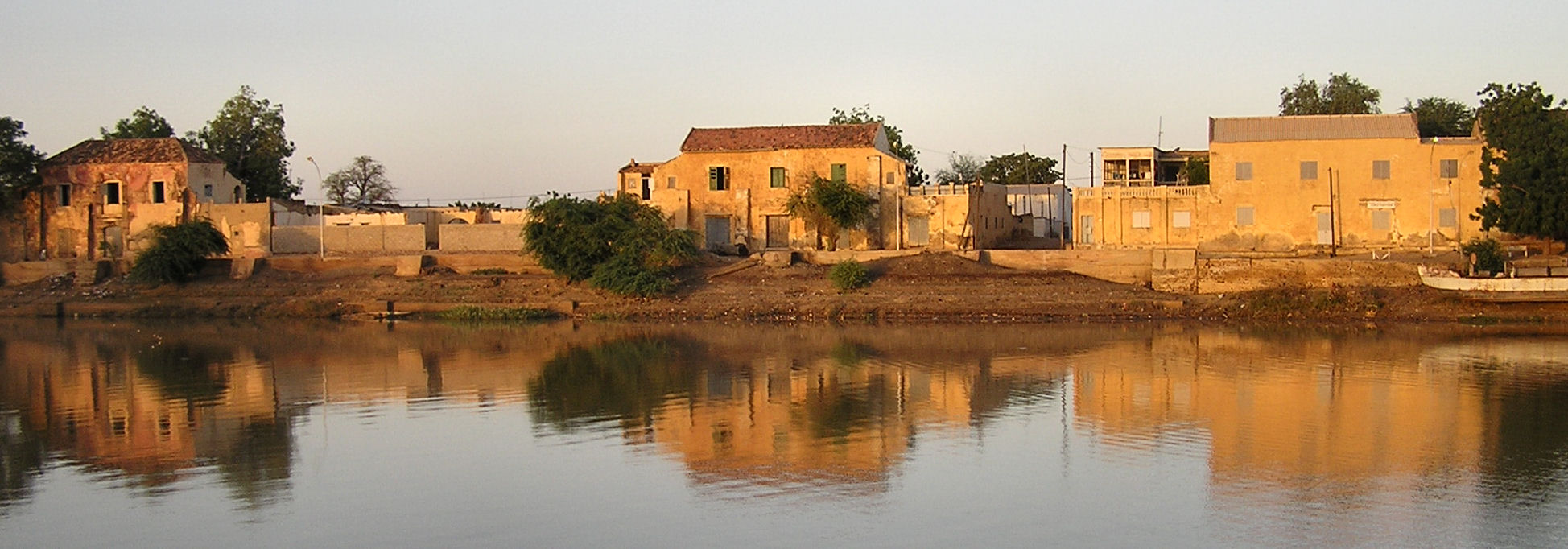
The old trading post of Podor

== Climate ==
Podor has a Sahelian climate, with extremely hot summers with some rain and very warm, almost rainless winters.

Climate data for Podor (1991–2020)
Month	Jan	Feb	Mar	Apr	May	Jun	Jul	Aug	Sep	Oct	Nov	Dec	Year
Mean daily maximum °C (°F)	31.8 (89.2)	34.0 (93.2)	37.2 (99.0)	39.9 (103.8)	41.8 (107.2)	41.2 (106.2)	38.3 (100.9)	36.9 (98.4)	37.3 (99.1)	39.1 (102.4)	36.6 (97.9)	33.2 (91.8)	37.3 (99.1)
Mean daily minimum °C (°F)	16.0 (60.8)	17.8 (64.0)	19.9 (67.8)	22.1 (71.8)	24.0 (75.2)	24.8 (76.6)	25.1 (77.2)	25.4 (77.7)	25.5 (77.9)	24.9 (76.8)	21.1 (70.0)	17.5 (63.5)	22.0 (71.6)
Record low °C (°F)	8.8 (47.8)	11 (52)	13.5 (56.3)	15 (59)	17.8 (64.0)	18.1 (64.6)	21 (70)	21 (70)	21 (70)	18 (64)	13.9 (57.0)	10.1 (50.2)	8.8 (47.8)
Average precipitation mm (inches)	4.0 (0.16)	0.5 (0.02)	0.9 (0.04)	0.2 (0.01)	1.3 (0.05)	7.6 (0.30)	52.5 (2.07)	85.5 (3.37)	80.1 (3.15)	9.2 (0.36)	0.7 (0.03)	0.2 (0.01)	242.7 (9.56)
Average precipitation days (≥ 1.0 mm)	0.1	0.2	0.1	0.1	0.2	1.0	3.3	6.4	5.9	1.1	0.2	0.1	18.7
Source: NOAA
