= Doué River =

River in Senegal

Coordinates: 16°38′46″N 15°04′03″W

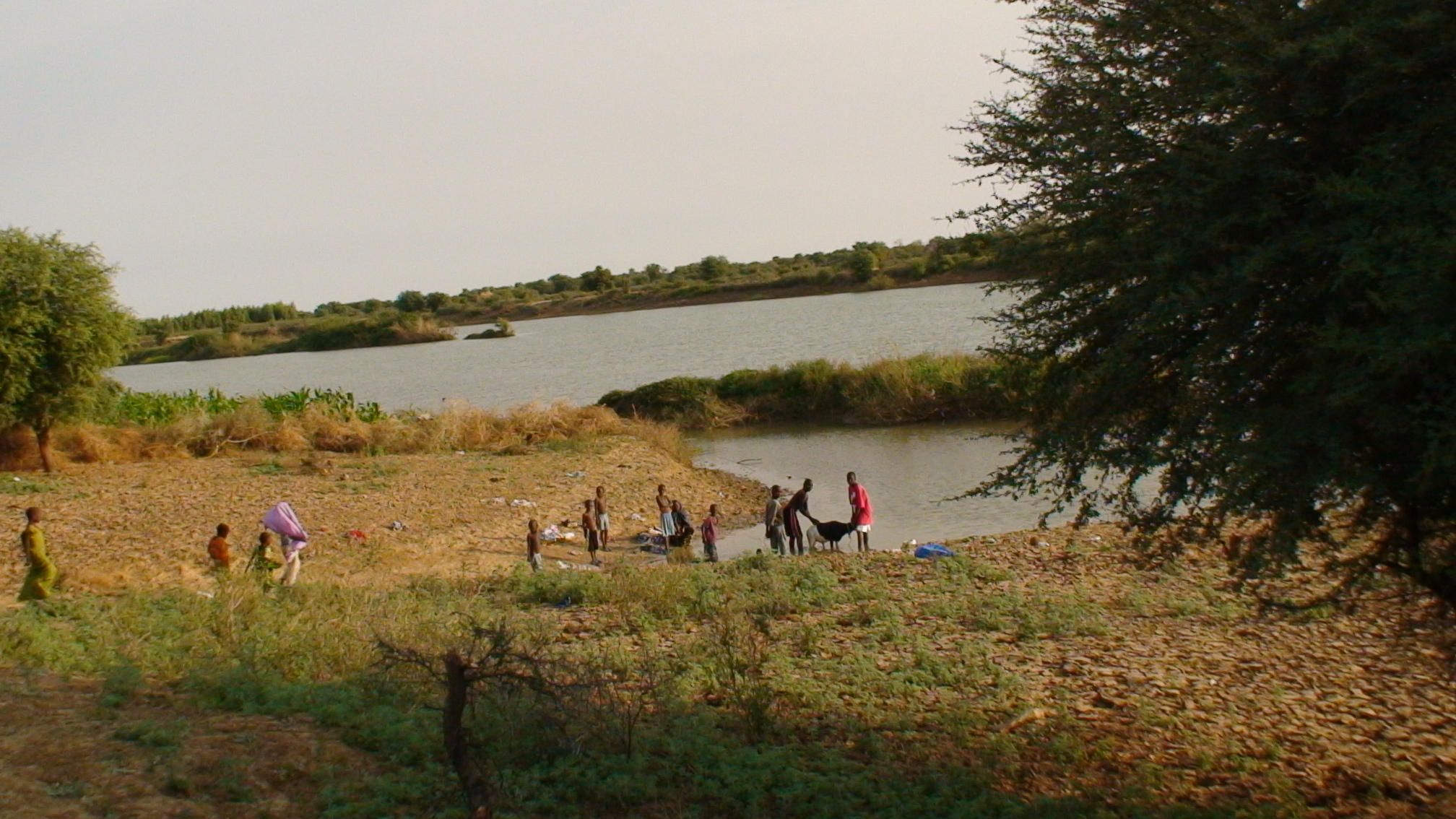
View of the Doué River

Doué River (French: Rivière Doué) is a left branch of the Senegal River in Senegal roughly between the cities of Kaédi and Podor. The Doué is about 68 kilometers long, and it runs parallel to the Senegal River on its southern side. The long land strip between the branches is called Morfil.

The Ndioum Bridge spans the Doué River to connect the town of Ndioum to Morphil Island. Prior to the bridge being built, people drowned frequently due to canoes and ferries being capsized.
