= Ashes (Kyla La Grange album) =

Studio album by Kyla La Grange
- Released: 30 July 2012
- Genre: Indie
- Producer: Brett Shaw; Marky Bates

Kyla La Grange chronology
Ashes (2012)	Cut Your Teeth (2014)

Singles from Ashes
- 1. "Been Better" Released: 10 July 2011; 2. "Heavy Stone" Released: 16 October 2011; 3. "Vampire Smile" Released: 12 February 2012; 4. "Walk Through Walls" Released: 20 July 2012; 5. "Been Better (re-release)" Released: 11 November 2012

Ashes is Kyla La Grange's debut album. It was produced by Brett Shaw at 123 Studios in East London, with two tracks produced by Marky Bates and was released on 30 July 2012. All songs were written by La Grange, except "Love You Better" which is a cover of The Maccabbes song from the album Wall of Arms.

"Been Better" was released as the album's lead single on 10 July 2011 with "Courage" as its B-Side. "Heavy Stone" was released as the second single on 16 October 2011 with "Lambs" as its B-Side. "Vampire Smile" was released as the third single on 12 February 2012 with the non-album track "Cold Favours" as its B-Side. "Walk through Walls" was released as the fourth single on 20 July 2012 with her cover of "Love You Better" as its B-Side. "Been Better" was re-released on 11 November 2012 with "To Be Torn" and the non-album track "Erased" as its B-Sides. In addition to these singles, "I Could Be" was released as an iTunes Free Single of the Week in August 2012.

Two songs of this album were featured in the season 1 of The CW network television series Beauty & the Beast, "To be Torn" was featured in season 1 episode 9 "Bridemaid Up!" and episode 10 "Seeing Red". "Catalyst" was featured in the season 1 episode 14 "Tough Love".

== Track listing ==
No.	Title	Writer(s)	Producer(s)	Length
1.	"Walk Through Walls"	Kyla La Grange	Brett Shaw	3:58
2.	"Courage"	La Grange	Shaw	4:17
3.	"I Could Be"	La Grange	Shaw	3:26
4.	"To Be Torn"	La Grange	Shaw	4:25
5.	"Vampire Smile"	La Grange	Marky Bates	2:45
6.	"Woke Up Dead"	La Grange	Shaw	3:37
7.	"Been Better"	La Grange	Shaw	3:43
8.	"Heavy Stone"	La Grange	Shaw	4:14
9.	"You Let It Go"	La Grange	Shaw	2:42
10.	"Catalyst"	La Grange	Shaw	4:08
11.	"Lambs" / "Sympathy" (hidden track; begins 7:48 into track 11)	La Grange	Bates; Shaw	11:39

Deluxe edition bonus tracks
No.	Title	Writer(s)	Producers	Length
12.	"Love You Better" (The Maccabees Cover)	Rupert Jarvis; Felix White; Orlando Weeks; Hugo White	Shaw	2:58
13.	"Walk"	La Grange	Shaw	2:46
14.	"The River"	La Grange	Bates	3:45

== Charts ==
Chart (2013)	Peak position
Swiss Albums (Schweizer Hitparade)	18
