= FRoots =

Former UK music magazine

fRoots
- fRoots issue 289, cover-dated July 2007
- Editor: Ian A. Anderson (1979–2019)
- Categories: Music (folk, world)
- Frequency: Monthly
- Circulation: 12,000 worldwide (2006)
- Publisher: Southern Rag Ltd
- Founded: 1979
- Final issue: 2019
- Country: England, United Kingdom
- Based in: Farnham
- Language: English
- Website: www.frootsmag.com
- ISSN: 0951-1326

fRoots (pronounced "eff-Roots", originally Folk Roots) was a specialist music magazine published in the UK between 1979 and 2019. It specialised in folk and world music, and featured regular compilation downloadable albums, with occasional specials. In 2006, the circulation of the magazine was 12,000 worldwide.

The magazine was also involved in live music production, as well as the BBC Radio 3 Awards for World Music and the Europe in Union concert series.

== Overview ==
In 1979, Southern Rag was founded by folk musician Ian A. Anderson with Caroline Hurrell and Lawrence Heath. It was renamed as Folk Roots in 1985, and in 1998 it became fRoots. The headquarters was initially in Farnham, Surrey and later moved to Bristol. Anderson remained the editor for the magazine's entire forty-year lifespan.

Since 1985, the magazine was published on a monthly basis, with compilation albums twice-yearly. After a 2017 Kickstarter campaign, it was re-launched in April 2018 as a larger quarterly magazine, including a compilation album with every issue.

On 2 July 2019, the editor announced that the magazine was suspending publication due to lack of funding, and that the Summer 2019 issue (issue 425) would be its last.

== Albums of the year ==
The fRoots Critics Poll Album of the Year was determined by a panel of "hundreds of experts" in the UK and internationally:

- 1986 Graceland by Paul Simon
- 1987 Soro by Salif Keita
- 1988 Amnesia by Richard Thompson
- 1989 Djam Leelii by Baaba Maal and Mansour Seck
- 1990 The Complete Recordings by Robert Johnson
- 1991 Barking Mad by Four Men and a Dog
- 1992 Lam Toro by Baaba Maal
- 1993 A Meeting by the River by Ry Cooder and V.M. Bhatt
- 1994 Waterson:Carthy by Waterson–Carthy
- 1995 Kate Rusby and Kathryn Roberts by Kate Rusby and Kathryn Roberts
- 1996 Norma Waterson by Norma Waterson
- 1997 Buena Vista Social Club by Buena Vista Social Club
- 1998 Red Rice by Eliza Carthy
- 1999 Kulanjan by Taj Mahal and Toumani Diabaté
- 2000 Wanita by Rokia Traoré
- 2001 Missing You / Mee Yeewnii by Baaba Maal
- 2002 Specialist in All Styles by Orchestra Baobab
- 2003 Bowmboi by Rokia Traoré
- 2004 Egypt by Youssou N'Dour
- 2005 Dimanche à Bamako by Amadou & Mariam
- 2006 Savane by Ali Farka Touré
- 2007 Segu Blue by Bassekou Kouyate & Ngoni Ba
- 2008 Low Culture by Jim Moray
- 2009 Très Très Fort by Staff Benda Bilili
- 2010 Hedonism by Bellowhead
- 2011 Ragged Kingdom by June Tabor & Oysterband
- 2012 Ground of Its Own by Sam Lee
- 2013 Clychau Dybon by Catrin Finch & Seckou Keita
- 2014 The Moral of the Elephant by Martin Carthy & Eliza Carthy
- 2015 From Here by Stick in the Wheel
- 2016 Lodestar by Shirley Collins
- 2017 Ladilikan by Trio Da Kali & Kronos Quartet
- 2018 SOAR by Catrin Finch & Seckou Keita

Between 2002 and 2008 the award was incorporated into the BBC Radio 3 Awards for World Music.

== Sources ==
- "Ian A. Anderson". interview. Dirty Linen. No. 59. August 1995. Archived from the original on 20 October 2006.
