= The Critics Group =

The Critics Group, also known as The London Critics Group, was a group of people who met to explore 'how best to apply the techniques of folk-music and drama to the folk revival' under the direction of Ewan MacColl and Peggy Seeger, with some participation from Bert Lloyd and Charles Parker. Running for eight years from the mid-1960s to the early 1970s, it was not a conventional musical group or band as it had no permanent line-up. Members would perform with each other on an ad-hoc basis as situations demanded.

== History ==
The group started out as a study group for singers, meeting once a week at MacColl and Seeger's home in Beckenham, attempting to raise the standards of singing. One of the main activities of the meetings was group criticism and discussion of each other's performances which subsequently earned the group its name, coined by Charles Parker when pressed for a name by a radio interviewer.

Many of the meetings were recorded, and some of these recordings are held as part of the Charles Parker Archive in the Birmingham City Archive and Heritage Service.

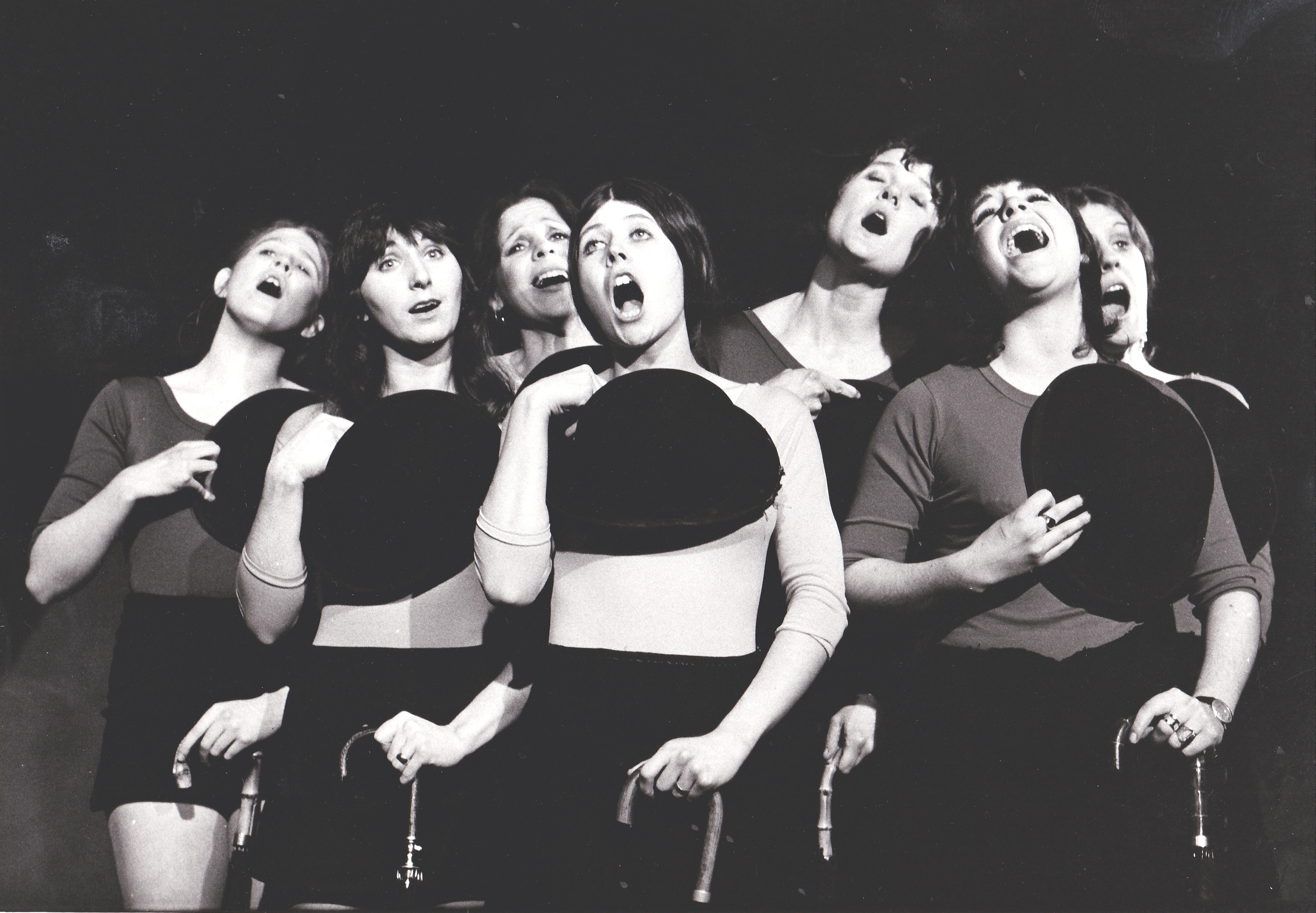
Festival of Fools, January 1972, New Merlins Cave, London

The group organised regular club nights at the Union Tavern in Kings Cross Road, which attracted musicians from all over the world. The best part of these evenings was often the 'lock-ins' which developed into impromptu musical sessions until the early hours of the morning. Under MacColl's writing and direction, and Seeger's musical direction, they went on to produce an annual show called the Festival of Fools, (FOF) a satirical review of the previous year which always drew capacity audiences but attracted little attention from either national or niche folk music press. Staged each Christmas season for five years, they moved rapidly on three stages through sketches and songs, loosely based around folk customs. The shows, from 1966 on, were performed in the back room of a pub just up the road from the Union Tavern, the New Merlin's Cave, since demolished. Members of the group built sets, made props and costumes, rigged sound and light systems, managed front of house, acted, sang and played, all while holding daytime jobs. A film of the last (1972) edition of FOF, diected by Ian MacMillan, is in the British Film Institute collection, https://collections-search.bfi.org.uk/web/Details/ChoiceFilmWorks/150165403

Members of the group at various times included Frankie Armstrong, Bob Blair, Brian Byrne (UK), Bobby Campbell, Helen Campbell (UK), Jim Carroll (UK), Phil Colclough, Aldwyn Cooper, Ted Culver, John Faulkner, Richard Humm, Allen Ives, Donneil Kennedy, Sandra Kerr, Paul Lenihan, Pat Mackenzie, Jim O'Connor, Maggie O'Murphy, Charles Parker, Brian Pearson, Michael Rosen, Buff Rosenthal, Susanna Steele, Denis Turner, Jack Warshaw, Terry Yarnell and others who joined for individual Festival of Fools shows.

The group released a number of recordings on the Argo label. Performing members hosted and sang at weekly Club evenings, started touring the UK, recording and acquiring a following of their own. Throughout their existence they were heavily involved in left wing politics, performing at trade union functions, rallies, picket lines, benefits and especially anti-Vietnam war events. At MacColl's instigation, members formed a sub-group for the purpose of creating and transmitting radio programmes to Vietnam, aimed at the thousands of GIs who were already questioning why they were there in the first place. From 1970 to 1972 four programmes, all called "Off Limits" were made. They were produced by Charles Parker, adapting the celebrated Radio Ballad docu-drama form on which he had collaborated with MacColl an Seeger. The programmes were allegedly sent to Vietnam through the North Vietnamese Charge D'Affaires and acknowledged by Ho Chi Minh himself. In 2016 the Australian Broadcasting Company transmitted a documentary by producer Gary Bryson, who had worked with Parker, telling the story of these forgotten programmes and the people who made them. A full recording of an "Off Limits" programme can be heard at https://soundcloud.com/jackaro/off-limits-2?in=jackaro/sets/jack-warshaws-playlist

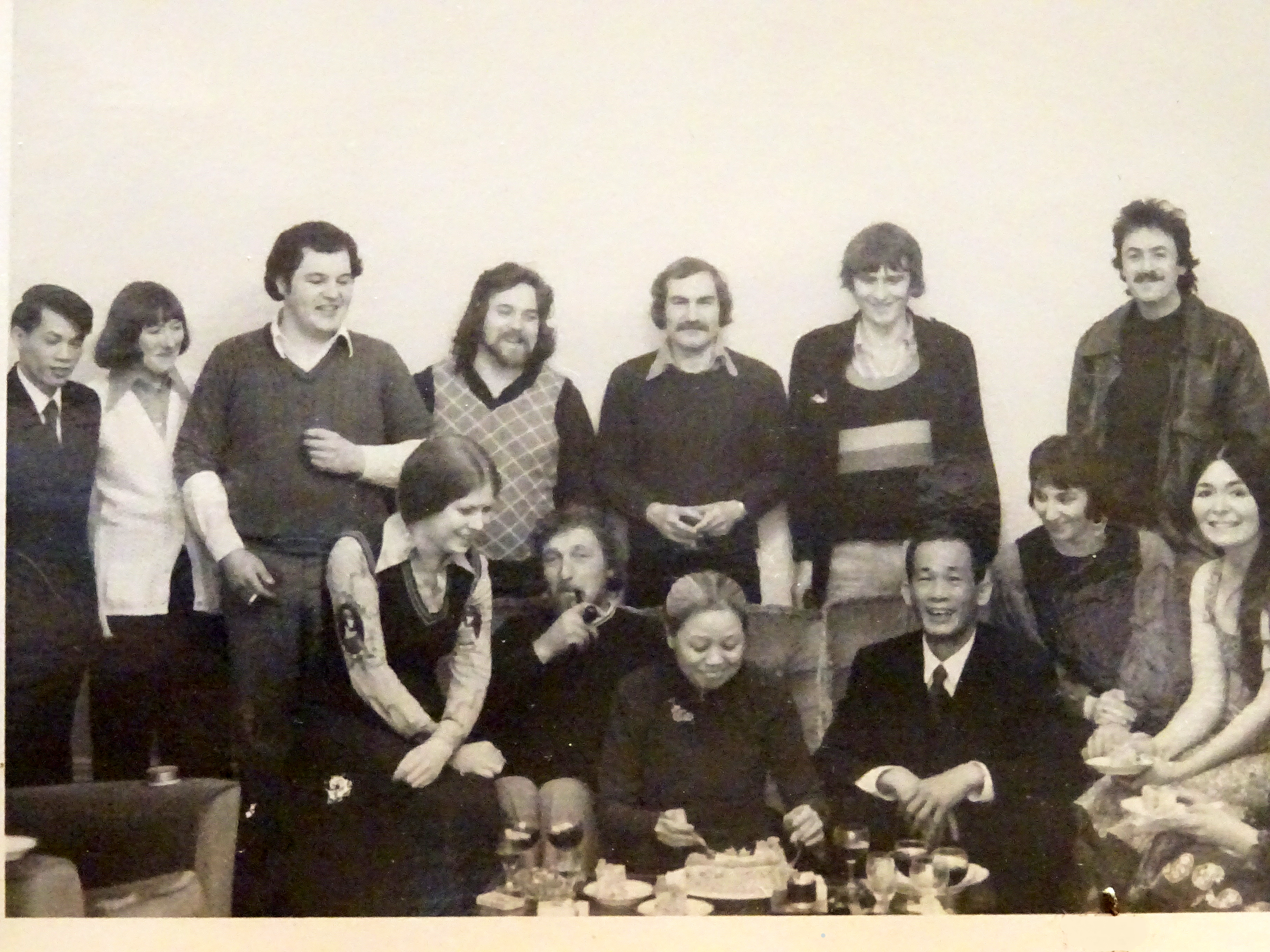
Critics and Combine members attend Vietnam Victory celebration in 1975l to r rear: Vietnam officer, Maggie Ives, Alan Ives, John Faulkner, Richard Humm, Ron Elliot, ?front: Dolores Keane, Tom Cobley, Mme Van Ngoc, Lai Van Ngoc, Sandra Kerr, Rita? Photo: Jack Warshaw

The last edition of the Festival of Fools took place in January and February 1972. There was tension within the group over MacColl's proposal to form a full time touring theatre company, which independent singers, some with other employment and family ties, resisted. At the end of the run the principal performing members of the Critics Group broke away from MacColl's leadership and formed the left-wing theatre group Combine, which produced weekly events in an east London pub, the Knave of Clubs. They created songs, plays, themed evenings and other events in a similar manner to the Critics, culminating in the Vietnam Victory Show of April 1975 at ASLEF Union Hall, which celebrated the final liberation of Saigon, or Ho Chi Minh City. A full recording of the show exists at https://soundcloud.com/jackaro/vietnam-victory-show-aslef-hall-june-1975-ok-2012

Former Critics Group members still performing, writing, recording, teaching and collecting include Michael Rosen, Frankie Armstrong, Sandra Kerr, John Faulkner, Jack Warshaw. Deceased members: Alan Ives, Tom Cobley, Ron Elliot.

As revealed in privately held recordings of Critics Group meetings (as discussed in a 2012 BBC radio programme presented by Martin Carthy), Ewan MacColl had developed strong views about the skill required to learn and perform folksongs, the extensive untapped range of the repertoire, composing new songs and how to sing them. Eventually MacColl sought to diversify the group, adding a theatre arm which he saw as a semi-autonomous and full-time, breaking the bounds of established theatre in the way he considered Theatre Workshop from which he had split more than a decade earlier had failed to achieve. But the theatre group members did not share that vision. MacColl's disappointment and the resulting animosity is what led to the split. Despite this, Critics Group members continued to perform at the Singers Club within a programme contrived to avoid contact with MacColl and Seeger into the next decade. Carthy's conclusion is that despite all of his flaws, MacColl made an enormous contribution to the UK folk revival, bringing professional discipline into the art of folk singing which endures amongst many of the original members and their descendants.

In 2016, 2017 and 2019, surviving Group members held reunions in London. The 2017 session, joined by Peggy Seeger included Jim and Sal O'Connor, Frankie Armstrong, Brian Pearson, Sandra Kerr, Richard Humm and Jack Warshaw. There was talk of planning a revival concert, but no further news has emerged.

== Discography ==
- Poetry and Song, Volumes 1–14 1966/7 Argo ZDA 50 – ZDA 63 (For use in secondary schools (11–16 years), edited by James Gibson and recorded in association with MacMillan & Co. Ltd.)
- A Merry Progress To London: An Anthology of London Songs (1966) Argo ZDA 46
- Sweet Thames Flow Softly (1967) Argo ZDA 47 (John Faulkner, Sandra Kerr, Terry Yarnell, Ted Culver and Jim O'Connor)
- Waterloo:Peterloo 1968 Argo ZFB 68 (Frankie Armstrong, John Faulkner, Brian Pearson, Denis Turner and Terry Yarnell with Sandra Kerr, Jim O'Connor and Peggy Seeger)
- The Female Frolic 1968 Argo ZDA 82
- As We Were a'Sailing 1970 Argo ZDA 137
- Living Folk 1970 Albatros VPA 8093 (recorded 24 April 1968, Teatro Lirico, Milan, Italy) [billed as The London Critics Group]
- Ye Mariners All 1971 Argo ZDA 138

== Available recordings ==
- 'Sweet Thames Flow Softly' Vocalion CDSML 8424 (review)
