= Fischli =

Fischli is a surname. Notable people with the surname include:

- Paul Fischli (born 1945), Swiss footballer and manager
- Peter Fischli (born 1952), Swiss artist
- Sam Fischli (born 1998), New Zealand rugby union player

== See also ==
- Fischlin
