= Oumou Sy =

Senegalese fashion designer

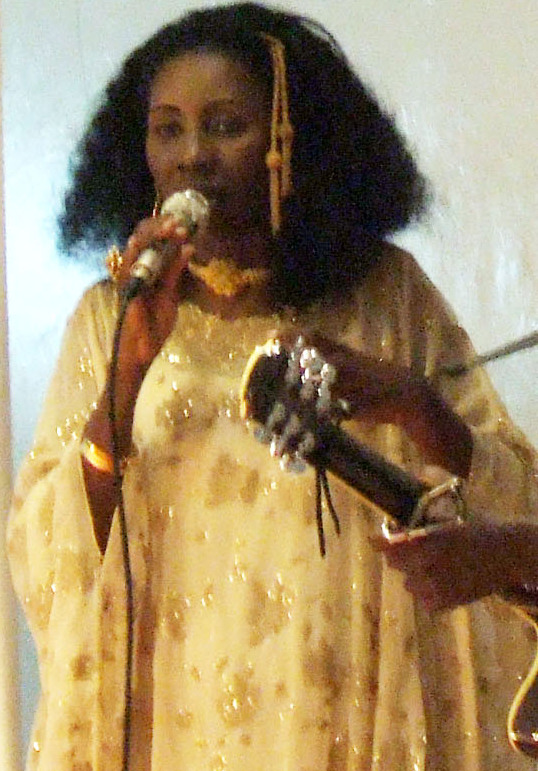
- Sy at the Metissacana Cafe during a fashion show in tribute to Léopold Sédar Senghor for the Dakar Biennale 2006.
- Born: 1952 (age 73–74); Podor, Senegal
- Occupation: Fashion Designer

Oumou Sy (born 1952 in Podor, Senegal) is a Senegalese fashion designer frequently referred to as "Senegal's Queen of Couture". She designed the wardrobe for the Senegalese singers Baaba Maal and Youssou N'Dour, and has won various awards at international film festivals for her costume designs.

In 1998, Sy was one of the three African fashion designers to win the Principal Prince Claus Award.
