= Mansour Seck =

Senegalese singer and musician (1955–2024)

- Born: 12 May 1955; Podor, French Senegal, French West Africa
- Died: 29 May 2024 (aged 69) Dakar, Senegal
- Genres: Worldbeat
- Occupation(s): Singer, songwriter
- Instrument(s): Kora, Acoustic Guitar
- Years active: 1982–2024

Mansour Seck (12 May 1955 – 29 May 2024) was a Senegalese singer and musician best known for his collaboration with lifelong friend Baaba Maal. He has also toured and released several solo albums. Seck was blind.

== Biography ==
Seck was born into the griot caste, traditionally of low status and associated with singing, story telling and playing musical instruments. From childhood, Seck has been a close friend of Baaba Maal, and in 1977 the two musicians travelled to explore the musical traditions of Mauritania and Mali.

Maal went to study Music in Dakar, and in 1982, he received a scholarship to study at the École des Beaux-Arts in Paris. Once established there Maal invited Seck and two other musicians to join him. They formed a band which became known as Dande Lenol (The People's Voice) and played mainly to the Senegalese immigrant communities of Paris. Seck was the band's primary guitarist. The album "Djaam Leeli" (1984) is from this early time together. As their confidence grew, they toured in the US together with Seck's first solo release coming in 1994.

Mansour Seck played alongside Baaba Maal as part of Dande Lenol at the WOMAD Festival at Charlton Park on 29 July 2007.

Seck died in Dakar on 29 May 2024, at the age of 69.

== Discography ==
- 1984 – Djam Leelii (with Baaba Maal) – Mango Records
- 1991 – Baayo (with Baaba Maal) – Mango Records
- 1994 – N'Der Fouta Tooro, Volume 1 – Stern's Africa
- 1995 – N'Der Fouta Tooro, Volume 2 – Stern's Africa
- 1995 – The Rough Guide to West African Music – World Music Network
- 1997 – Yelayo – Stern's Africa
- 1999 – Unwired: Acoustic Music from Around the World – World Music Network
- 2013 – The Rough Guide to the Music of Senegal – World Music Network
