= Kyla La Grange =

English singer and songwriter

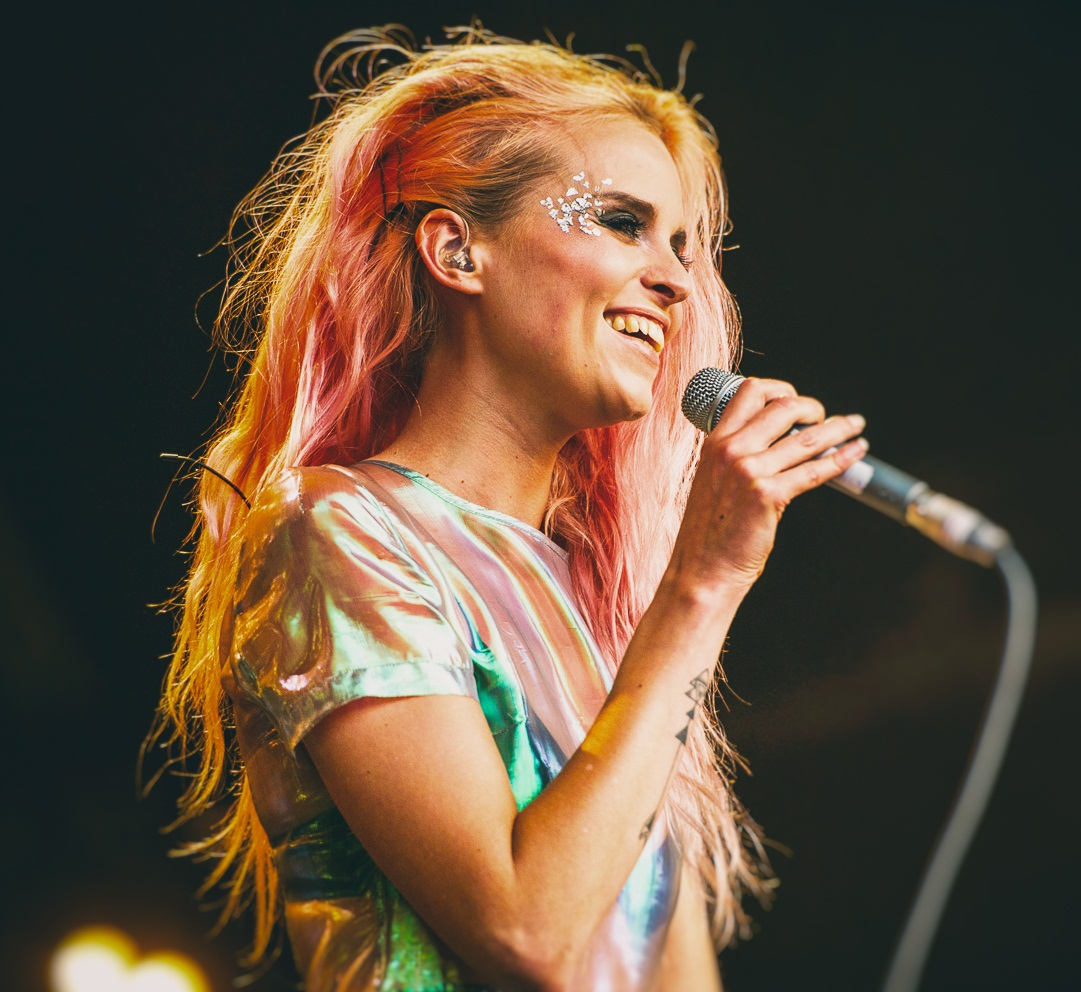
- La Grange performing live.

Background information
- Born: 25 July 1986 (age 40); Watford, England
- Education: Pembroke College, Cambridge
- Genres: Indie pop; synthpop; electronic
- Occupations: Singer; songwriter
- Years active: 2011–present
- Labels: Sony; Ioki
- Website: www.kylalagrange.com

Kyla La Grange (born 25 July 1986) is an English singer and songwriter from Watford, England.

== Career ==
=== Early life ===
She studied at Rickmansworth School in Croxley Green, Hertfordshire. Her mother is South African, while her father is from Rhodesia (modern-day Zimbabwe) though both live in England. She achieved a 2.1 in philosophy, studying at Pembroke College, Cambridge, from 2004 to 2007. In June 2012, Kyla headlined the Guardian New Band of the Day gig.

=== Ashes (2011–2012) ===
Kyla had early success on the Amazing Radio new music chart. 'Walk Through Walls' was number one for five weeks in March and April 2011, and 'Been Better' topped the chart for 4 weeks in July. These were subsequently the top two songs in the year-end chart. Her debut album Ashes was produced by Brett Shaw at 123 Studios in East London, with two tracks produced by Marky Bates and was released on 30 July 2012.

All the songs on the album were written by La Grange, except "Love You Better" which is a cover of The Maccabees song from the album Wall of Arms. "Been Better", "Heavy Stone", "Vampire Smile" and "Walk Through Walls" were released as singles. In addition to these singles, "I Could Be" was released as an iTunes Free Single of the Week in August 2012.

=== Cut Your Teeth (2014) ===
La Grange's second studio album, entitled Cut Your Teeth was released on 2 June 2014 and was preceded by an eponymous single and a second single "The Knife". The album explores minimalistic electronic music produced by electronic producer Jakwob.

=== While Your Heart's Still Beating (2015–present) ===
In 2015, she released two standalone singles, "So Sweet" and "Skin". She released further singles, "Hummingbird" in late April 2016, and another, "Justify", in December 2016.

From 2015 to 2016, she toured as a vocalist with British electronic act Faithless for their Faithless 2.0 live shows.

In January 2022, she released her third album, While Your Heart's Still Beating, which she described as her most raw and personal record yet. Singles included "Neverland", "Nurture", and a cover of N-Trance's "Set You Free".

In October 2022, she embarked on a UK tour of the album.

== Discography ==
=== Albums ===
Title	Album details	Peak chart positions			
Title	Album details	UK	UK Downloads	UK Record Store	SWI
Ashes	Released: 30 July 2012; Label: Sony Music	—	—	9	18
Cut Your Teeth	Released: 2 June 2014; Label: Sony Music	93	69	—	22
While Your Heart’s Still Beating	Released: 21 January 2022; Label: Night Heron	—	—	—	—

=== Singles ===
Year	Single	Peak positions							Album
Year	Single	UK Physical Singles	DEN	NED	NOR	SWE	SWI	US Dance/ Mix Show Airplay	Album
2011	"Walk Through Walls"	70	—	—	—	—	—	—	Ashes
2011	"Been Better"	—	—	—	—	—	—	—	Ashes
2011	"Heavy Stone"	—	—	—	—	—	—	—	Ashes
2012	"Vampire Smile"	37	—	—	—	—	—	—	Ashes
2014	"Cut Your Teeth"	—	12	21	39	50	69	15	Cut Your Teeth
2014	"The Knife"	—	—	—	—	—	—	—	Cut Your Teeth
2015	"So Sweet"	—	—	—	—	—	—	—	Non-album singles
2015	"Skin"	—	—	—	—	—	—	—	Non-album singles
2016	"Hummingbird"	—	—	—	—	—	—	—	Non-album singles
2016	"Justify"	—	—	—	—	—	—	—	Non-album singles
2017	"Love Harder"	—	—	—	—	—	—	—	Non-album singles
2017	"Violet Blue"	—	—	—	—	—	—	—	Non-album singles
2021	"Set You Free"	—	—	—	—	—	—	—	While Your Heart's Still Beating
2021	"Neverland"	—	—	—	—	—	—	—	While Your Heart's Still Beating
2022	"Nurture"	—	—	—	—	—	—	—	While Your Heart's Still Beating
