= Cargo Records (UK) =

British record label

- Parent company: Cargo Records (Canada)
- Founded: 1992
- Founder: Eric Goodis; Randy Boyd; Phillip Hill
- Country of origin: United Kingdom
- Location: London, England
- Official website: cargorecords.co.uk

Cargo Records is a record label based in London, England, which distributes musical recordings in the United Kingdom and Europe. The company currently distributes records in a wide variety of genres, both as a label in its own right and as a distributor for other independent record labels.

The company was first established in 1992 as a division of the Canadian record company Cargo Records. When its original founders sold the Canadian parent company to new owners in 1995, the British office was not part of the sale – instead, it became a separate company which continued to be owned and operated by founder Phillip Hill. At the same time, his former business partner Eric Goodis took over ownership and operation of the former parent company's office in the United States to form Cargo Music. The American and British companies thus were not affected by the Canadian company's bankruptcy in 1997, and both remained in operation as of 2024.
