= Baaba Maal =

Senegalese singer and guitarist (born 1953)

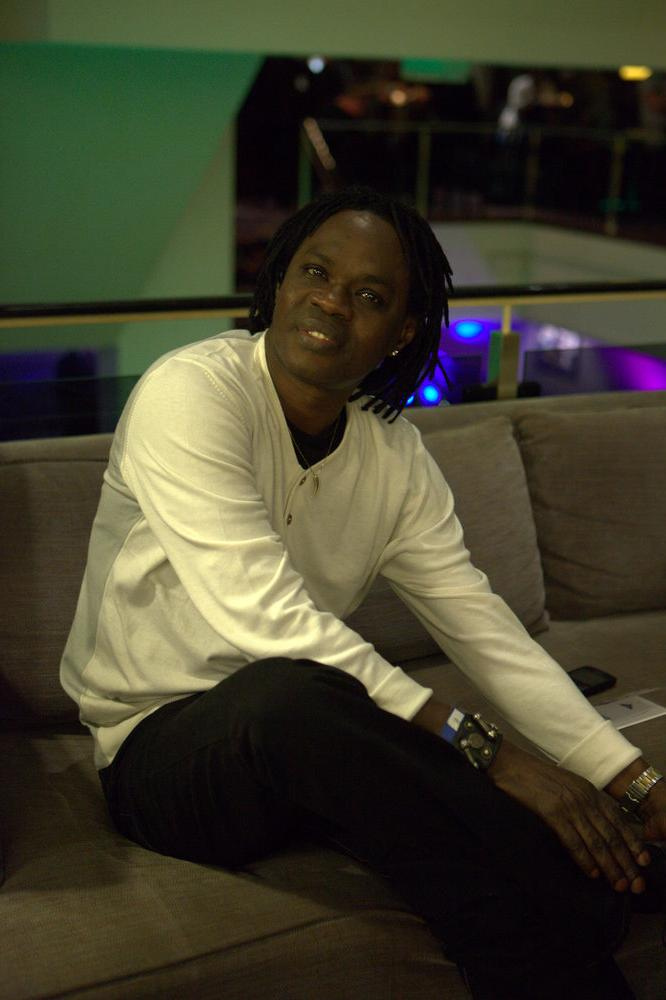
- Maal in 2011

Background information
- Born: 13 June 1953 (age 73); Podor, French West Africa (now Senegal)
- Genres: Worldbeat
- Occupations: Singer; songwriter; composer
- Instruments: Vocals; guitar
- Years active: 1989–present
- Labels: Mango; Palm; Marathon Artists
- Website: www.baabamaal.com

Baaba Maal (Fula: 𞤄𞤢𞥄𞤦𞤢 𞤃𞤢𞥄𞤤, born 13 June 1953) is a Senegalese singer and guitarist born in Podor, on the Senegal River. In addition to acoustic guitar, he also plays percussion. He has released several albums, both for independent and major labels. In July 2003, he was made a UNDP Youth Emissary.

Maal sings primarily in Pulaar and promotes the traditions of the Pulaar-speaking people, who live on either side of the Senegal River in the ancient Senegalese kingdom of Futa Tooro.

== Early life and education ==
Maal was expected to follow in his father's footsteps and become a fisherman. However, under the influence of his lifelong friend and family gawlo, blind guitarist Mansour Seck, Maal devoted himself to learning music from his mother and his school's headmaster. He went on to study music at the university in Dakar before leaving to study musical notation in Paris. During this time, he stayed for three years in the French capital, where he took courses at the Conservatoire de Paris, had private tuition and was taken with Mozart.

== Career ==
After returning to Senegal, Maal studied traditional music with Mansour Seck and began performing with the band Daande Lenol. Maal's fusions continued into the next decade with his Firin' in Fouta (1994) album, which used ragga, salsa and Breton harp music to create a popular sound that launched the careers of Positive Black Soul, a group of rappers, and also led to the formation of Afro Celt Sound System. His fusion tendencies continued on 1998's Nomad Soul, which featured Brian Eno as one of seven producers. In addition to his various solo releases, he contributed to two tracks, "Bushes" and "Dunya Salam", on the concept album 1 Giant Leap.

In 1998, Maal recorded "Bess, You Is My Woman Now" for the Red Hot Organization's compilation album Red Hot + Rhapsody: The Gershwin Groove, a tribute to George Gershwin that raised money for various charities devoted to increasing HIV/AIDS awareness and fighting the disease. In 2002, Maal again worked with the Red Hot Organization, recording "No Agreement" alongside Res, Tony Allen, Ray Lema, Positive Black Soul and Archie Shepp; as well as "Trouble Sleep Yanga Wake Am" alongside Taj Mahal and featuring Kaouding Cissoko and Antibalas, for the tribute album to Fela Kuti, Red Hot + Riot: The Music and Spirit of Fela Kuti.

On 7 July 2007, Maal performed at the Live Earth concert, Johannesburg.

Maal's album On the Road, a live acoustic album recorded straight from the mixing boards of his shows over a 10-year period, was released in 2008. A new studio album, Television, was released in 2009.

He appears on two tracks "Hunger" and "Still" on the Black Hawk Down film soundtrack and performed on the title track of the 2008 video game Far Cry 2, in addition to helping to create the whole soundtrack for that game. He played at Bonnaroo and the Sierra Nevada World Music Festival in 2010.

On 4 May 2013, Maal performed at the 2013 edition of the Harare International Festival of the Arts in Zimbabwe.

In 2014, he contributed to the BBC Music's remake of The Beach Boys song "God Only Knows".

Maal's 11th studio album, The Traveller, recorded with Johan Hugo from the Very Best and Winston Marshall (Mumford & Sons), was released via Palm and Marathon Artists The lead singles, "Fulani Rock" and "Gilli Men", received critical acclaim. in January 2016, and was accompanied by a UK tour and headlining Senegal's Festival Blues Du Fleuve. Maal accompanied Mumford & Sons on their Gentlemen of the Road tour around South Africa in 2015. He also released a song and accompanying live performance music video with Mumford & Sons called "There Will Be Time".

In 1998 Maal was honoured by the Dutch-based Prince Claus Fund, which rewards people who have a progressive and contemporary approach to the themes of culture and development.

Maal voiced the Wakandan soundtrack of Black Panther for Ludwig Göransson, helping introduce Göransson to many of the African musicians who contributed to the score. Maal's vocals can be heard on tracks "Wakanda" and "A King's Sunset." The two musicians rejoined each other to collaborate on the score for the sequel Black Panther: Wakanda Forever, including Maal doing a brief cameo in the film itself as a funeral singer. To celebrate the launch of the film's trailer, Maal and Massamba Diop staged a performance at San Diego ComicCon. His vocals can be heard on the sole track, "Nyana Wam."

In an interview with The Metropolitan Museum of Art in 2020, Maal discussed the ritual quality of traditional instruments, and how he chooses instruments to convey his songs' messages: "The spirit of the kora and the ngoni are different from the talking drum and the balafon, or the sabar and the djembe. The kora and ngoni are closer to human beings, because they are made from things that had life. The talking drum, the balafon, and the sabar are made from wood, and when you listen to them your mind goes out into the forest. When you make music and write songs, you have to know about the messages. From the messages, you know what the instruments are and how to put them together underneath the lyrics."

== Humanitarian works ==
Early in his career, Baaba Maal advocated disease prevention and poverty relief in Africa, with his songs often reflecting the social and health challenges of the continent. In July 2003, he was made a UNDP Youth Emissary.

On March 28, 2016, Maal launched Nann-K, a charity focusing on global sustainable development. Maal performed at the launch, which took place on International Women’s Day to honor the role of women in business development in Africa. NANN-K's mission is to assist people from Senegal and other African countries in pursuing agricultural careers, including farming, animal husbandry, and fishing. According to their website, "All these are time-old rural pursuits but they have never been organized or brought into the 21st century, let alone combined with the latest digital thinking."

On December 11, 2019, Maal promised to fight the desertification in the Sahel by planting trees. He said he hoped every person in Senegal could say they planted a tree.

In April 2023, Maal was named a UNCCD (United Nations Convention to Combat Desertification) Goodwill Ambassador after a stint serving as UNCCD Land Ambassador alongside fellow Malian musician Inna Modja.

== Discography ==
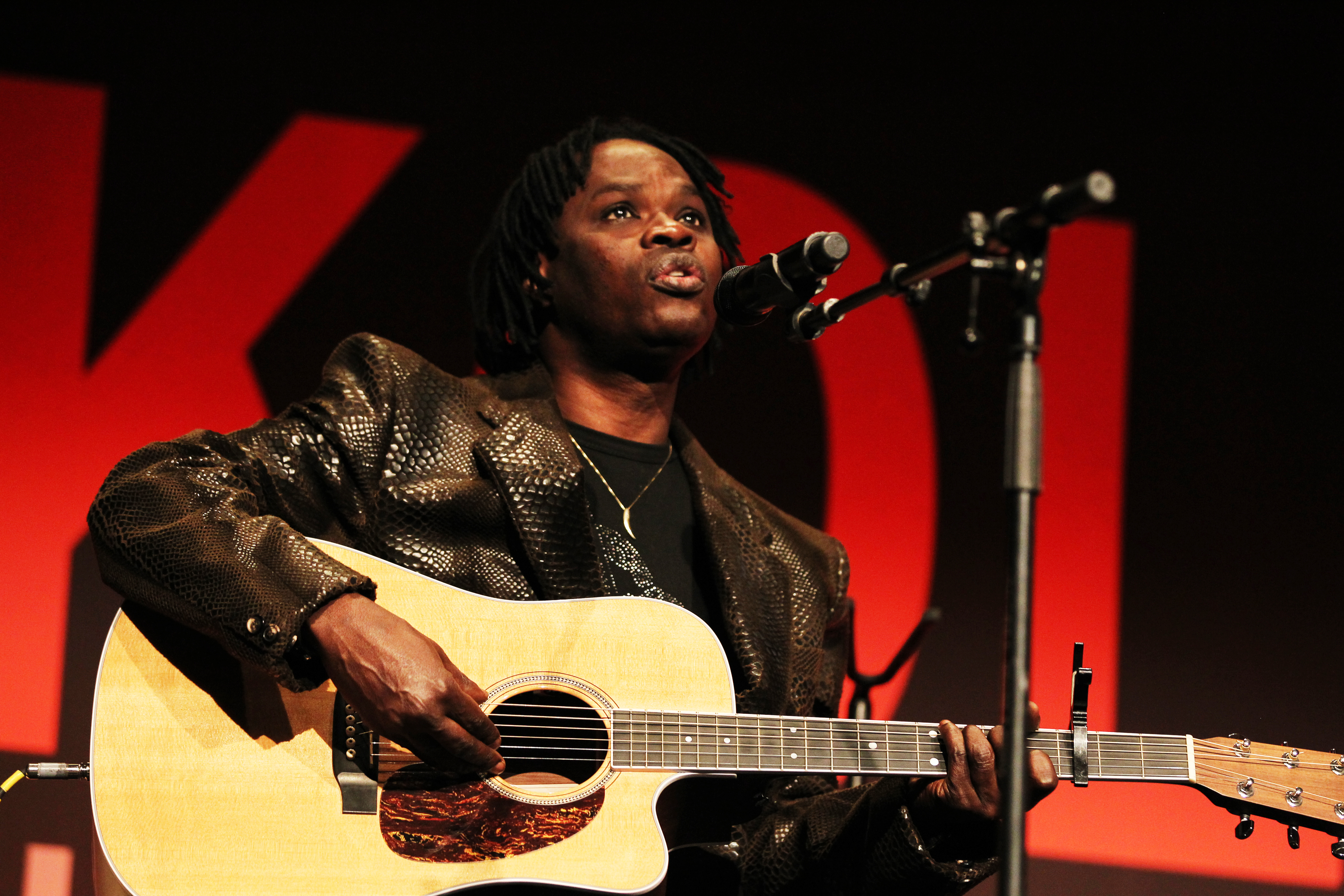
Maal performing at the Opening Plenary at the New Theatre, in March 2011

=== Studio albums ===
- Djam Leelii (with Mansour Seck) (1989, Mango Records)
- Baayo (with Mansour Seck) (1991, Mango)
- Lam Toro (1992, Mango)
- Wango (1987, Syllart)
- Firin' in Fouta (1994, Mango)
- Gorel (1995, 4th & Broadway)
- Taara (1997, Melodie)
- Nomad Soul (1998, Palm Pictures) – No. 33 Australia
- Djam Leelii: The Adventurers (1998, Yoff Productions)
- Jombaajo (2000, Sonodisc)
- Missing You (Mi Yeewnii) (2001, Palm)
- Television (2009, Palm)
- The Traveller (2016, Palm / Marathon Artists)
- Being (2023, Palm / Marathon Artists)

=== Compilation albums ===
- The Best of the Early Years (2003, Wrasse)
- Palm World Voices: Baaba Maal (2005, Palm)
- On the Road (2008, Palm)

=== Import releases ===
- Jombaajo
- Ngalanka
- Ndilane
- C'est la vie

=== Contributing artist ===
- Passion – Sources compilation (1989, Real World Records)
- Unwired: Acoustic Music from Around the World – (1999, World Music Network)
- Television with Brazilian Girls (2009, Palm)
- The Rough Guide to the Music of Senegal (2013, World Music Network)
- Johannesburg with Mumford and Sons (2016, Glassnote Entertainment Group)
- Black Panther Original Score with Ludwig Göransson (2018, Marvel Music Inc.)
- Black Panther: Wakanda Forever Original Score with Ludwig Göransson (2022, Marvel Music Inc.)

=== DVDs ===
- 1999 – Live at the Royal Festival Hall – Palm Pictures

== Additional sources ==
- Ndao, Sidy Mockhtar. "Images et émotions dans la rhétorique de Baaba Maal." Langues & Cultures 4, no. 1 (2023): 81–88.
