= Proper Music Distribution =

- Founder: Malcolm Mills
- Genre: All genres
- Country of origin: United Kingdom
- Official website: ProperMusicGroup.com

Proper Music Distribution is the largest independent music distributor in the UK, with annual sales of over £25million. It is a wholly owned subsidiary company of Proper Music Group Limited. In recent years it has been a frequent winner of coveted Music Week Awards. "Music Week – Best Distribution Team" and Diversity in the Workplace. In 2017, the company relocated to a new, purpose-built 100,000sq. ft. distribution centre in Dartford, Kent.

In January 2022, it was announced the Switzerland-headquartered fintech company Utopia Music had acquired Proper Music Distribution's parent company, Proper Music Group. Later in 2022, Utopia Music acquired physical entertainment distributor Cinram Novum, which has now become part of Proper Music Distribution, powered by Utopia.

== Distributed artists ==
A selection from thousands of distributed artists include:

- Aimee Mann
- Amy LaVere
- Beth Neilsen Chapman
- Bird in the Belly
- Cara Dillon
- Daughter
- Dr John
- Eliza Carthy
- Joan Baez
- Martin Carthy
- Nick Cave
- Nick Lowe
- Oysterband
- Paul Carrack
- Pet Shop Boys
- Richard Thompson
- Travis

== Distributed record labels ==
Examples of their distributed labels include:

- Alligator Records
- Big Chill
- Crammed Discs
- ECM Records
- Far Out Recordings
- Fellside Records
- Fledg'ling
- The Last Music Company
- MiG-music
- Naim Records
- Navigator Records
- Ploughboy Records
- Proper Records
- Real World Records
- Ruf Records
- Sain
- Shanachie Records
- Soundway Records
- Stoney Plain Records
- Topic Records
- Whirlwind Records
