= Sandra Kerr =

English folk singer (1942–2026)

- Born: 14 February 1942; Plaistow, Essex, England
- Died: 29 October 2026 (aged 84)
- Occupation: Folk singer
- Children: Nancy Kerr

Sandra Joan Kerr (14 February 1942 – 29 October 2026) was an English folk singer, songwriter, and academic. Kerr played in the bands The Critics Group and Sisters Unlimited and in a duo with John Faulkner. Kerr and Faulkner wrote music for the television series Bagpuss and Kerr was also a voice actor for a number of television series. Kerr, who had grown up in the East End, moved to northeast England where she taught music at Newcastle University for 17 years. Her daughter is the musician, Nancy Kerr.

== Early life ==
Sandra Joan Kerr was born in Plaistow, Essex, England, on 14 February 1942. She was the daughter of dock worker, Roderick Kerr and factory worker, Violet (née Skipper) Kerr. Kerr grew up in the East End of London. Kerr attend Plaistow Grammar School.

== Career ==
She sang and played a number of instruments, including the Appalachian dulcimer, the autoharp, the English concertina, guitar, spoons, and the whistle. Kerr was a member of The Critics Group from 1963 to 1972.

She and her husband John Faulkner then performed as a duo. Together, she wrote the music for the television series Sam on Boffs’ Island, then for the television series Bagpuss, in which Kerr also voiced the character of Madeleine (the rag doll).

Kerr was a voice actor for a number of television series. She was involved in many programmes for BBC Radio including The Music Box and Listen with Mother. She wrote music for the children's show Play School.

She sang in the groups Sisters Unlimited and Voice Union and later with her daughter Nancy Kerr. Her work developed to include teaching and leading workshops and she was the director of two folk choirs, Wercasfolk and VoiceMale.

Kerr was on faculty at Newcastle University's music department, where she taught a course on the music of the British Isles for 17 years until 2017.

== Personal life and death ==
In 1964, Kerr married musician, John Faulkner; they divorced in 1975. In 1979, she married musician Ron Elliott; the couple had one daughter, Nancy Kerr. Elliott died in 1990. She was in a relationship with David Malone when she died.

Kerr lived in Warkworth, Northumberland. She died from leukaemia on 29 October 2026, aged 84.

== Discography ==
- 'A Merry Progress to London' with the Critics Group (Argo ZFB 60 1966)
- 'Sweet Thames Flow Softly' with the Critics Group (Argo ZDA 47 1966)
- 'Waterloo-Peterloo' with the Critics Group (Argo ZFB 68 1968)
- 'The Female Frolic' with the Critics Group (Argo ZDA 82 1968)
- 'John & Sandra' (Argo ZFB 2 1969)
- 'Bagpuss: the Songs & Music' with John Faulkner (Fellside – Smallfolk SMF1 1999)
- 'Yellow Red and Gold' (Fellside FECD152)
- 'My Song is My Own' with Frankie Armstrong, Alison McMorland and Kathy Henderson (Plane Label TPL 0001, 1980)
- 'Nuclear Power No Thanks' with Frankie Armstrong, Roy Bailey, Martin Carthy, Ron Elliott, Howard Evans, Chris Foster, John Kirkpatrick, Alison McMorland, Brian Pearson, Geoff Pearson, Leon Rosselson & Roger Williams (Plane Label IMP2 LP, 1981)
- 'Scalene' with Nancy Kerr & James Fagan (Fellside FECD137)
- 'Supermum' children's songs by Sandra Kerr and friends (Pucca Records YOP 05 LP, UK, 1983)
- 'We Were There' with the Oysterband (Pucca Records YOP 08 LP, UK, 1987)
- 'No Limits' Sisters Unlimited with Janet Russell, Peta Webb and Rosie Davis (1991 Harbour Town)
- 'No Bed of Roses' Sisters Unlimited with Janet Russell, Peta Webb and Rosie Davis (Fellside FECD104)
- 'Neat and Complete' with Nancy Kerr (1996 Fellside FECD107)
- 'Guess What They're Selling at the Happiness Counter' with Leon Rosselson (Fuse Records 1992)
- 'Five Little Frogs' with Nancy Kerr, Leon Rosselson, and Kevin Graal
- 'Five Little Owls' with Nancy Kerr, Leon Rosselson, and Kevin Graal
- 'Voice Union' with Evelyne Girardon and Liliana Bertolo (Fellside FECD119)

=== Books ===
- Kathy Henderson, Frankie Armstrong and Sandra Kerr. My Song is My Own. London: Pluto Press, 1979 ISBN 0-86104-033-3 & ISBN 0-86104-032-5 / ISBN 9780861040322 (One hundred traditional and composed women's songs from the British Isles, with select bibliography and discography.)
- Kerr, Sandra (1 December 1994). The Song Sampler: 26 Folk Songs from Around the World for Group Singing. Illustrated by Rik Walton (2nd ed.). Newcastle upon Tyne: Folkworks. ISBN 9780952075455. OCLC 772808123.

== See also ==
- Political Song Network
