= Daniel Fischlin =

Canadian academic and musician

Daniel Fischlin is a Canadian academic and musician. He is the University Research Chair and Full Professor of English and Theatre Studies at the University of Guelph.

== Early life ==
Fischlin has a BFA in Music Performance, an MA in Interdisciplinary Studies (Musicology/English Literature; Concordia University), and a PhD in English Literature (York University), with a dissertation on the English lute song directed by Richard Hillman. In addition to his research activities in the arts and humanities he has been active as a musician for most of his life, most recently with the free-improvisation group, the Vertical Squirrels.

== Research ==
Fischlin is the University Research Chair and Full Professor of English and Theatre Studies at the University of Guelph.

Fischlin's specialty is early modern Renaissance studies. His experience teaching Shakespeare has led to a number of projects including Adaptations of Shakespeare: A Critical Anthology of Plays from the 17th Century to the Present, co-edited with Mark Fortier, published in 2000 by Routledge. Additionally he is the founder and director of the Canadian Adaptations of Shakespeare Project (CASP), the largest online resource in the world for the study of Shakespeare's relation to a national theatrical practice. The website was launched in 2004 and expanded in August 2007.

In early 2009, he launched the Shakespeare Made in Canada Virtual Exhibit, which he curated at the MacDonald Stewart Arts Centre, in Guelph, ON. The Exhibit houses a multitude of resources (film, photographs, and other multimedia) that document the relationship between Canadian culture and Shakespeare. It brought together, for the first time, hundreds of rare artifacts, including the Canadian-owned Sanders Portrait of Shakespeare, contemporary Canadian theatre designs, Shakespeare in French Canada, contemporary Aboriginal adaptations of Shakespeare, new portraiture, an innovative learning commons for youth, as well as new and archival material from the CASP project. The exhibit inspired the publication of a book, Shakespeare Made in Canada: Contemporary Canadian Adaptations in Theatre, Pop Media, and Visual Arts, which documented the Shakespeare Made in Canada Exhibit and was edited by Fischlin and co-curator Judith Nasby.

Fischlin has experience in humanities computing design and innovation. Among others, he has been creator and designer on a number of online projects including literacy games for youth, interactive readers, content-based site design, and the Romeo + Juliet app, released in 2011 on the Apple iOS platform for iPhone, iPad, and iPod. Fischlin was also the lead designer/creator/producer of ‘Speare, an online 3D video game for youth that teaches Shakespearean literacy, launched in April 2007. He was also the creative mind behind the online literacy game Chronos, launched in the fall of 2008 on the CASP site. Additionally, Fischlin played a key role in the 2008 film Battle of Wills by Anne Henderson, documenting the steps taken to authenticate the Sanders Portrait of Shakespeare.

Fischlin is a partner of the German Bremer Institut für Kanada-und Québec-Studien, BIKQS (Bremen Institute on Canada and Quebec-Studies).

== Music ==
Fischlin is active as a musician and has recorded most recently with the Vertical Squirrels, an instant composition, free improvisation collective he co-founded with Ajay Heble, Lewis Melville, and Rob Wallace.

The Vertical Squirrels is "a Canadian free improvisation musical collective dedicated to diverse musical expressions as a teaching and learning tool––and also as a vehicle for building community and establishing positive dialogue across personal, cultural, linguistic, geographic, and political barriers." Initially conceived as an informal outlet to get Heble back into playing piano after years of curating the Guelph Jazz Festival (but rarely performing himself), the Squirrels quickly morphed into a recording and gigging band focused on their distinctive brand of in-the-moment improvisation. Since then, the Vertical Squirrels have performed, playlisted, and reviewed internationally.

The band's first CD, Hold True (Accroche-toi!) was released in 2010 on the Montreal-based label Ambiances Magnétiques and their second CD, Winter’s Gate, was released in 2011 under the BarCode Free label. The band's latest endeavor is an album in collaboration with Grammy-nominated Canadian jazz musician Jane Bunnett, as well as Larry Cramer, Ben Grossman, and Scott Merritt, forthcoming in 2013.

== Works ==
Fischlin has co-edited two books on the socio-political implications of improvised creative musics with Ajay Heble, project director of the MCRI research project, 'Improvisation, Community, and Social Practice'. These are The Other Side of Nowhere: Jazz, Improvisation, and Communities in Dialogue and Rebel Musics: Human Rights, Resistant Sounds, and the Politics of Music Making. He has also published two other books that study the relations between music and literary texts and music, nationalism, and gender and has published 14 books with several forthcoming across a range of disciplines including human rights, literary theory and biography, Latin American studies, and Jacobean studies. University presses with whom he has published include Oxford University Press, Columbia University Press, Duke University Press, Wesleyan University Press, and Wayne State University Press.

Fischlin's most recent books, co-authored with Martha Nandorfy, include The Concise Guide to Global Human Rights (Oxford University Press and Black Rose Books, 2007), and sequel to that book entitled The Community of Rights / The Rights of Community (also with Oxford University Press and Black Rose Books). These latter two books are part of the "Rights Trilogy,' co-authored with Nandorfy, which focuses on rights theory from the perspective of storytelling, principles of earth democracy, and a critique of conventional discourses of rights that exclude the environment.

The first book in the trilogy, Eduardo Galeano: Through the Looking Glass was the first full-length, critical study of the Uruguayan writer Eduardo Galeano, author of the Memory of Fire trilogy, and of the ground-breaking political critique Open Veins of Latin America. Part political biography, part cultural theory, Fischlin's and Nandorfy's book examines events that shaped Galeano's life through the lens of the rights implications embedded in the stories he tells—from his close personal friendship with Allende, through the dictatorships in Uruguay and Argentina that forced him into exile, to the ongoing relationship between Galeano and Subcomandante Marcos, leader of the Chiapas rebellion.

Published with Duke University Press is another co-authored book (with Ajay Heble and George Lipsitz) that addresses rights issues in relation to improvisation and musical discourses associated with jazz, entitled The Fierce Urgency of Now: Improvisation, Rights, and the Ethics of Co-creation. Another forthcoming book is OuterSpeares: Shakespeare, Intermedia, and the Limits of Adaptation, which examines the relations between Shakespearean adaptation and intermedia. Fischlin is also the General Editor of the new Duke University Press book series entitled Improvisation, Community, and Social Practice, featuring books written as part of the research outcomes associated with the MCRI project of the same name. He is a founding co-editor of Critical Studies in Improvisation/Études critiques en improvisation, a journal, which is an open-access, peer-reviewed, electronic, academic journal on improvisation, community, and social practice housed at the University of Guelph. In 2013, he was named as General Editor of the Oxford University Press re-edition of Shakespeare plays from a specifically Canadian scholarly perspective, Shakespeare Made in Canada.

== Publications ==
- OuterSpeares: Shakespeare, Intermedia, and the Limits of Adaptation. Ed. Daniel Fischlin. (forthcoming University of Toronto Press, 2014).
- “The Fierce Urgency of Now”: Improvisation, Rights, and the Ethics of Co-creation. Co-authored with Ajay Heble and George Lipsitz. Durham, NC: Duke University Press, (2013).
- The Community of Rights • The Rights of Community. Co-authored with Martha Nandorfy. Montreal: Black Rose Books, 2011, and New Delhi: Oxford University Press, 2012.
- Improvisation, Human Rights, and the Politics of Hope. Co-authored with Ajay Heble and George Lipsitz. Wesleyan University Press, 2010.
- A Concise Guide to Global Human Rights. Co-authored with Martha Nandorfy. New Delhi: Oxford University Press, 2007. (Hardcover). Paperback Rpt. New Delhi: Oxford UP, 2012.
- Creator and editor; The Interactive Folio and Study Guide: Romeo and Juliet. Canadian Adaptations of Shakespeare Project (April, 2007).
- Shakespeare Made in Canada: Contemporary Canadian Adaptations in Theatre, Pop Media and Visual Arts. Co-editor with Judith Nasby. Guelph: Macdonald Stewart Art Centre, 2007.
- A Concise Guide to Global Human Rights. Co-authored with Martha Nandorfy. Montreal: Black Rose Books, 2006. (Hardcover and Softcover).
- The Other Side of Nowhere: Jazz, Improvisation, and Communities in Dialogue. Co-edited with Ajay Heble. Wesleyan University Press; Music/Culture Series, 2004.
- Rebel Musics: Human Rights, Resistant Sounds, and the Politics of Music Making. Co-edited with Ajay Heble. Montreal: Black Rose Books, 2003.
- Eduardo Galeano: Through the Looking Glass. Co-authored with Martha Nandorfy. Montreal: Black Rose Books; 2002. Published in conjunction with the Institute of Policy Alternatives of Montréal (IPAM).
- Royal Subjects: Essays on the Writings of James (VI)I. Co-edited with Mark Fortier; foreword by Kevin Sharpe. Wayne State UP, 2002.
- Adaptations of Shakespeare: A Critical Anthology of Plays from the 17th Century to the Present. Co-edited with Mark Fortier. London: Routledge, 2000).
- In Small Proportions: A Poetics of the English Ayre, 1596-1622. Wayne State UP, 1998. Nominated for the ACLA Harry Levin Prize; the Roland A. Bainton Prize (AHA); the First Book Prize (MLA); the Phyllis Goodhart Gordan Book Prize (RSA); the British Council Prize in the Humanities; and the Greenberg Prize (AMS).
- The Work of Opera: Genre, Nationhood, and Sexual Difference. Co-edited with Richard Dellamora. Columbia UP, 1997.
- James I: The True Law of Free Monarchies and Basilikon Doron. Introduced, annotated, and co-edited with Mark Fortier. Tudor and Stuart Text Series. Toronto: Centre for Reformation and Renaissance Studies, 1996.
- Negation, Critical Theory, and Postmodern Textuality. Dordrecht: Kluwer, 1994.

=== Book series edited ===
- General Editor. Improvisation, Community, and Social Practice Series. Duke University Press. 2012 (ongoing).
- General Editor. Shakespeare Made in Canada Series. Oxford University Press. 2013 (ongoing).

== Awards ==
Fischlin has won a number of teaching and research awards including:

• the OCUFA (Ontario Confederation of University Faculty Associations) Distinguished Teaching Award;

• the University of Guelph Faculty Association (UGFA) Distinguished Professor Award for Teaching;

• the University of Guelph College of Arts Teaching Excellence Award;

• the Premier's Research Excellence Award (Government of Ontario), first-ever to be awarded to a researcher in the Humanities;

• several Social Sciences and Humanities Research Council of Canada (SSHRC) Standard Research Awards;

• and as a core researcher/applicant on the multimillion-dollar Improvisation, Community, and Social Practice MCRI grant.
