= Pegah =

Pegah may refer to:

== People ==
- Pegah Ahangarani (born 1984), Iranian actress
- Pegah Anvarian, American fashion designer
- Pegah Ahmadi (born 1974), Iranian poet, scholar, literary critic and translator of poetry
- Pegah Edalatian (born 1980), German politician of Iranian descent

== Other uses ==
- Pegah F.C., an Iranian football club based in Rasht, Gilan, Iran
