= Book café (disambiguation) =

Book café is a book-themed café and also may refer to:

- Ivar Matlaus Book Café
- The Book Café (Zimbabwe), a platform for free cultural expression, winner of a Prins Claus Prize in 2011
- Manga cafe, a café where people can read manga
