= Nidia (given name) =

Nidia is a female given name that may refer to professional wrestler Nidia Guenard or another notable person listed below:

- Nidia Barboza (born 1954), Costa Rican poet and feminist activist
- Nidia Bustos, Nicaraguan director
- Nidia Morrell (born 1953), Argentine astronomer
- Nidia María Jiménez Vásquez, Costa Rican politician
- Nidia Vílchez (born 1964), Peruvian politician
