= Prince Claus Fund =

International cultural award

The Prince Claus Fund was established in 1996. It was named after Prince Claus of the Netherlands, the late husband of Queen Beatrix. It is annually subsidized by the Dutch Ministry of Foreign Affairs.

Since 1997, the fund has presented the international Prince Claus Awards annually to recognize individuals and organizations for their contemporary approaches to culture and development. Recipients are primarily based in Africa, Asia, Latin America, and the Caribbean.

The recipients are selected by a jury composed of experts from fields related to the promotion of culture and development.

The jury evaluates candidates based on the cultural and social impact of their work, as well as its overall quality. The Prince Claus Fund defines culture broadly, including artistic and intellectual disciplines, science, media, and education.

The Principal Award, valued at €100,000, is presented each December during a ceremony at the Royal Palace in Amsterdam. Additional awards, each valued at €25,000, are presented in December and January at Dutch embassies in the recipients' respective countries.

Each year, the Fund publishes a book that includes the awards speech delivered by one of the Honorary Chairmen, an excerpt from a lecture by a leading thinker, the jury's report, and analyses of the laureates' work by experts in their respective fields.

== The 1997 Prince Claus Awards ==
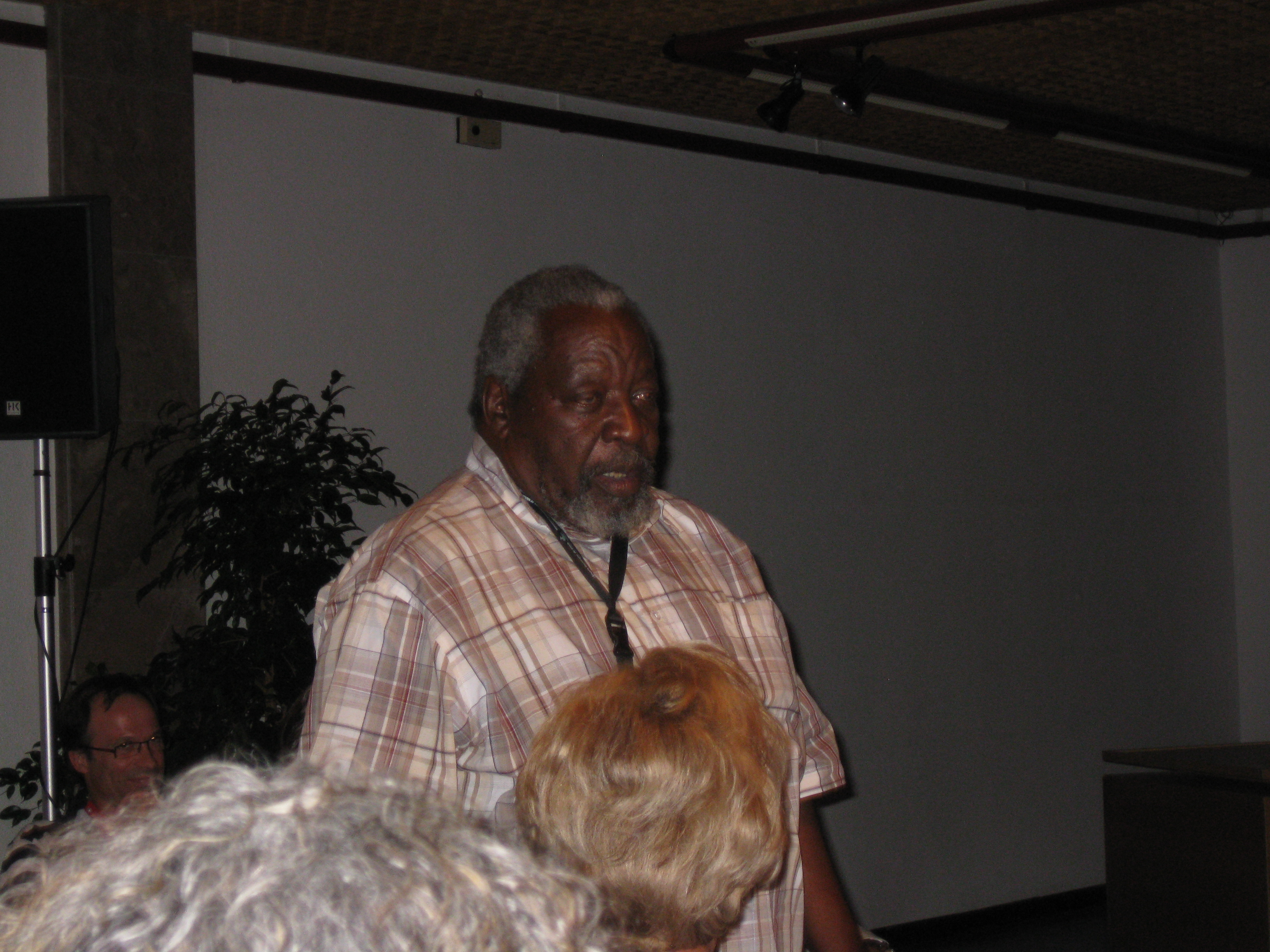
Malangatana Ngwenya

=== Theme ===
The 1997 awards reflected the policy aims of the Prince Claus Fund: recognizing exceptional work in culture and development in Asia, Latin America, and especially Africa.

=== Laureates ===
- The Zimbabwe International Book Fair (Principal Award)
- Council for the Development of Social Science Research in Africa (CODESRIA) (Senegal)
- Index on Censorship (United Kingdom), an organization for the freedom of speech
- Malangatana Ngwenya (Mozambique), artist, painter and poet
- Joseph Hanson Kwabena Nketia (Ghana), ethnomusicologist and composer
- Sardono Waluyo Kusumo (Indonesia), choreographer, dancer and filmmaker
- Bruno Stagno (Chile/Costa Rica), architect
- Jim Supangkat (Indonesia), sculptor, art critic and curator
- Abdeljelil Temimi (Tunisia), historian
- Ernest Wamba dia Wamba (D.R. Congo/Tanzania), political philosopher

=== Committee ===
The Committee consisted of Adriaan van der Staay, Lolle Nauta, and Anil Ramdas.

== The 1998 Prince Claus Awards ==
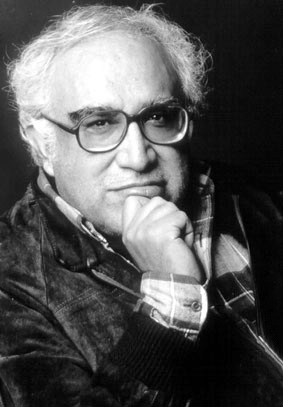
Carlos Monsiváis

=== Theme ===
"The Art of African Fashion"

=== Laureates ===
- Alphadi (Niger) (Principal Award), fashion designer
- Oumou Sy (Senegal) (Principal Award), fashion designer
- Tetteh Adzedu (Ghana) (Principal Award), fashion designer
- Rakhshan Bani-E'temad (Iran), filmmaker
- Heri Dono (Indonesia), artist, painter, sculptor and installation artist
- Ticio Escobar (Paraguay), art critic, curator and museum director
- Jyotindra Jain (India), art and culture scientist
- Jean-Baptiste Kiéthéga (Burkina Faso), an archeologist and historian
- David Koloane (South Africa), visual artist and curator
- Baaba Maal (Senegal), singer
- Carlos Monsiváis (Mexico), writer, philosopher and journalist
- Redza Piyadasa (Malaysia), artist and art critic
- Rogelio Salmona (Colombia), architect
- Kumar Shahani (India), filmmaker
- Tian Zhuangzhuang (China), filmmaker
- Nazik Saba Yared (Lebanon), writer, essayist and literature critic

=== Committee ===
Adriaan van der Staay, Charles Correa, Emile Fallaux, Mai Ghoussoub, Gaston Kaboré, Gerardo Mosquera.

== The 1999 Prince Claus Awards ==
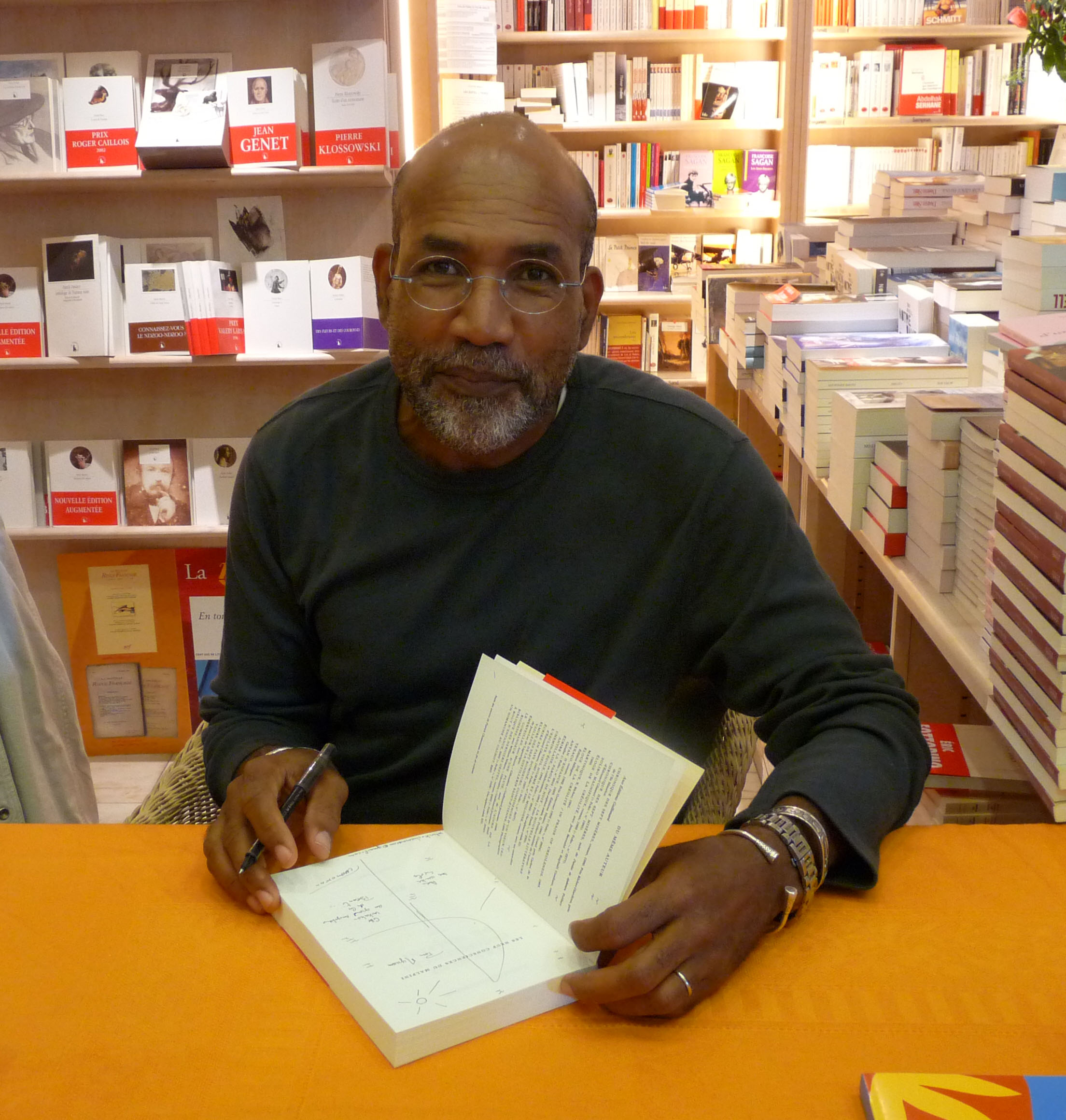
Patrick Chamoiseau

=== Theme ===
"Creating Spaces of Freedom"

=== Laureates ===
- Mohand Fellag (France/Algeria) (Principal Award), comedian, actor and writer
- Vitral (Cuba) (Principal Award), socio-cultural magazine
- Al Jazeera (Qatar) (Principal Award), an independent television network
- Patrick Chamoiseau (Martinique), writer
- Paulin J. Hountondji (Benin), philosopher
- Cildo Meireles (Brazil), sculptor, installation and conceptual artist
- Pepetela (Angola), writer
- Dessalegn Rahmato (Ethiopia), sociologist
- Juana Marta Rodas and Julia Isídrez (Paraguay), ceramics artists
- Claudia Roden (United Kingdom/Egypt), cookery book writer
- Cheick Oumar Sissoko (Mali), filmmaker
- Tsai Chih Chung (Taiwan), cartoonist, comic strip artist and cartoon filmmaker
- Ken Yeang (Malaysia), architect

=== Committee ===
Adriaan van der Staay, Charles Correa, Emile Fallaux, Mai Ghoussoub, Gaston Kaboré, Gerardo Mosquera.

== The 2000 Prince Claus Awards ==
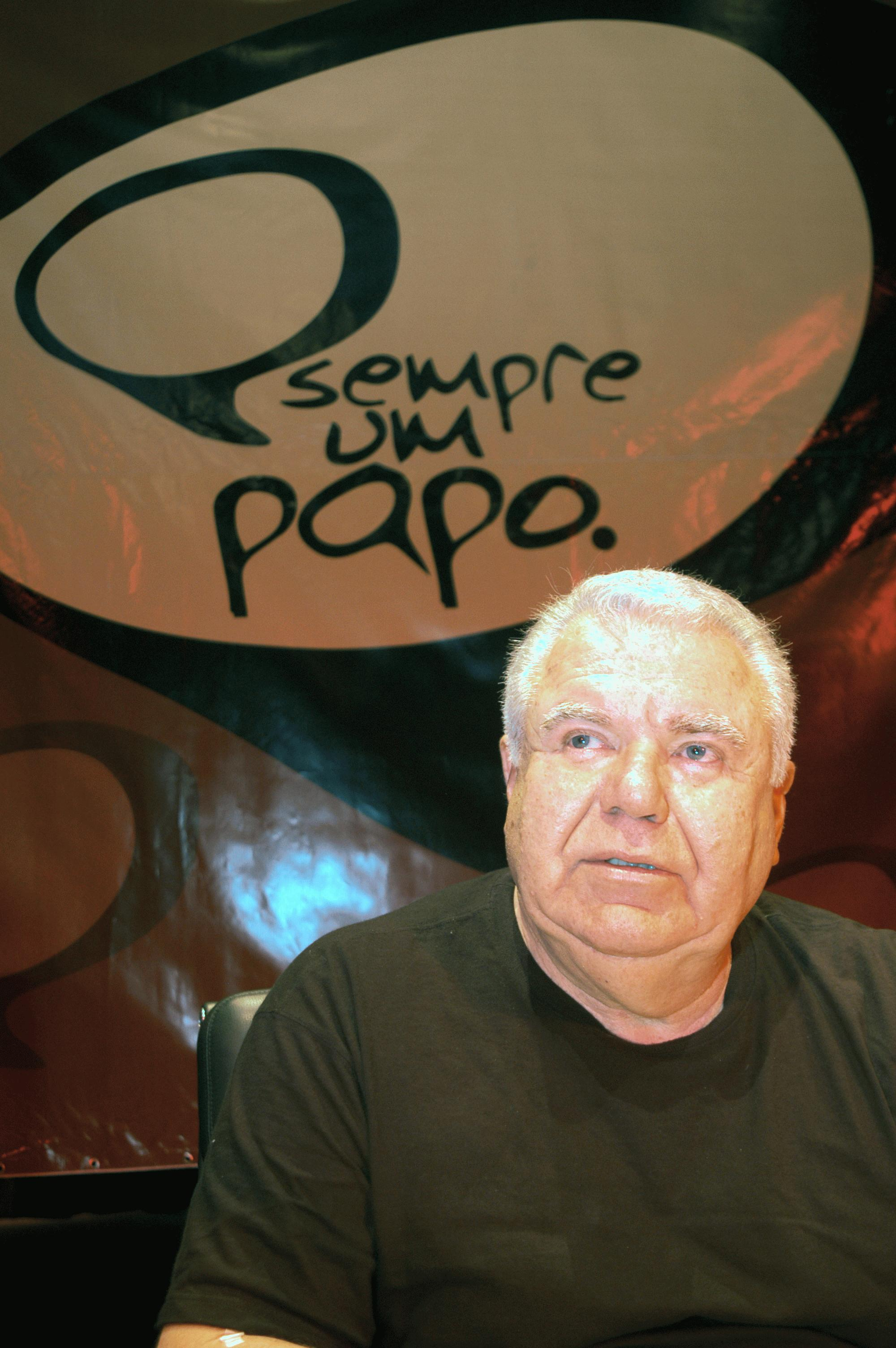
Jaime Lerner

=== Theme ===
"Urban Heroes"

=== Laureates ===
- Jaime Lerner (Brazil) (Principal Award), architect
- Viva Rio (Brazil) (Principal Award), social work peace organization
- Francisco Toledo (Mexico) (Principal Award), artist painter
- Bush Radio (South Africa), independent radio station
- Communalism Combat (India), a human rights organization
- Cui Jian (China), singer-songwriter, trumpeter, guitarist and film actor
- Film Resource Unit (South Africa), independent film distributor
- Arif Hasan (Pakistan), architect, urban planner, socio-philosopher and poet
- Bhupen Khakhar (India), visual artist
- Komal Kothari (India), ethnomusicologist
- Werewere Liking (Ivory Coast), art painter, filmmaker and writer
- Ayu Utami (Indonesia), radio broadcaster and writer
- Van Leo (Egypt), photographer

=== Committee ===
Adriaan van der Staay, Charles Correa, Emile Fallaux, Mai Ghoussoub, Gaston Kaboré, Gerardo Mosquera, Bruno Stagno.

== The 2001 Prince Claus Awards ==
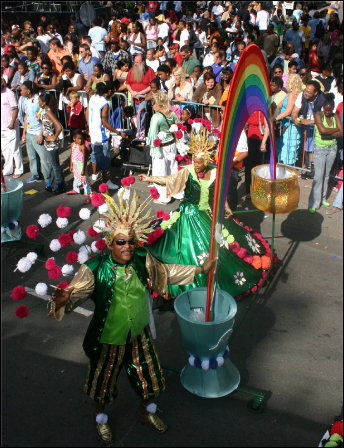
Summer Carnival in Rotterdam, 2006

=== Theme ===
"A Carnival."

=== Laureates ===
- Summer Carnival, Rotterdam (Netherlands) (Principal Award), Caribbean carnival
- Peter Minshall, designer (Trinidad) (Principal Award), carnival costume designer
- Chris Abani (Nigeria), writer and poet
- Duong Thu Huong (Vietnam), writer
- Samuel Fosso (Cameroon), photographer
- Jahan-e Ketab (Iran), a literary magazine
- Miri Maftun (Afghanistan), ethnomusicologist
- Antun Maqdisi (Syria), a political philosopher
- Ibrahim el-Salahi (Sudan/United Kingdom), artist and painter
- Elena Rivera Mirano (United States, Philippines), singer, choir leader and musicologist
- Talingo (Panama), a cultural magazine
- Iván Thays (Peru), writer

=== Committee ===
Adriaan van der Staay, Charles Correa, Mai Ghoussoub, Gaston Kaboré, Gerardo Mosquera, Bruno Stagno.

== The 2002 Prince Claus Awards ==
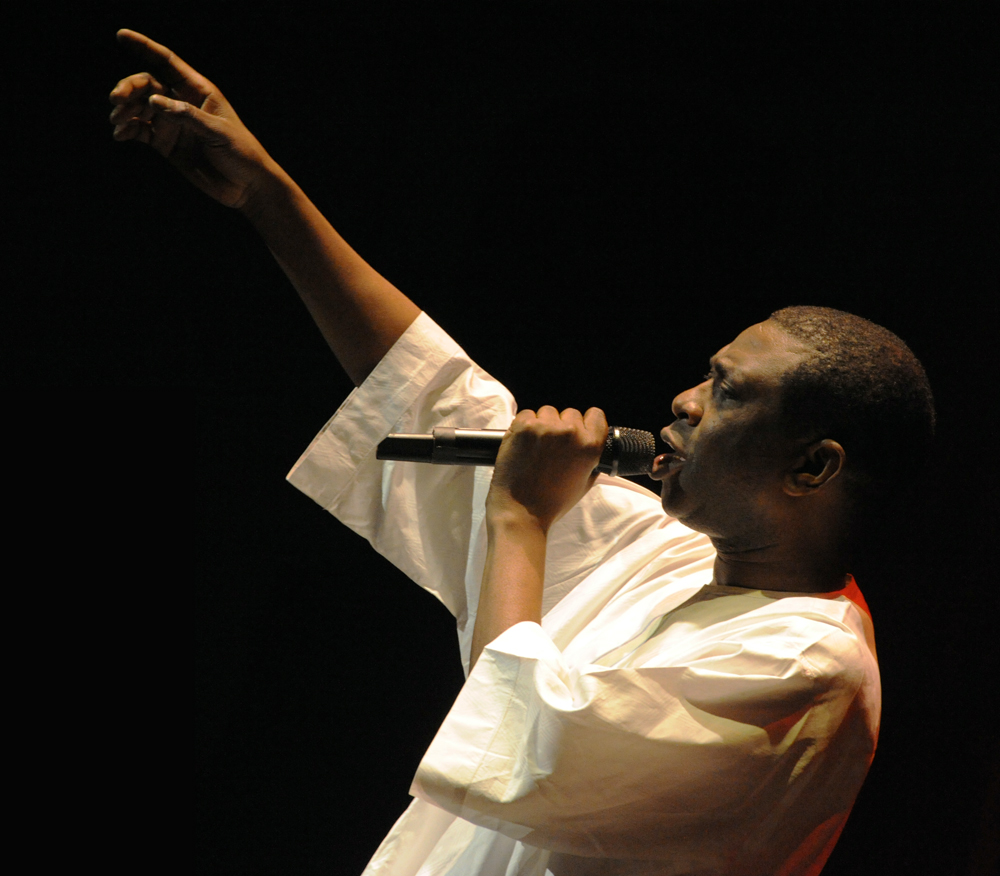
Youssou N'Dour

=== Theme ===
"Languages and transcultural forms of expression."

=== Laureates ===
- Mohamed Chafik (Morocco) (Principal Award), writer
- Marcelo Araúz Lavadenz (Bolivia), festival director, cultural promoter and choir leader
- Ali Farzat (Syria), cartoonist
- Ferreira Gullar (Brazil), writer and art critic
- Amira Hass (Israel), writer
- Institute for Islamic and Social Studies (Indonesia), human rights organization and study center
- Virginia Pérez-Ratton (Costa Rica), artist, art critic and curator
- Youssou N'Dour (Senegal), singer
- Walter Tournier (Uruguay), animation filmmaker
- Wu Liangyong (China), town-planner

=== Committee ===
Adriaan van der Staay, Sadiq Jalal al-Azm, Aracy Amaral, Goenawan Mohamad, Pedro Pimenta, Claudia Roden, Bruno Stagno.

== The 2003 Prince Claus Awards ==
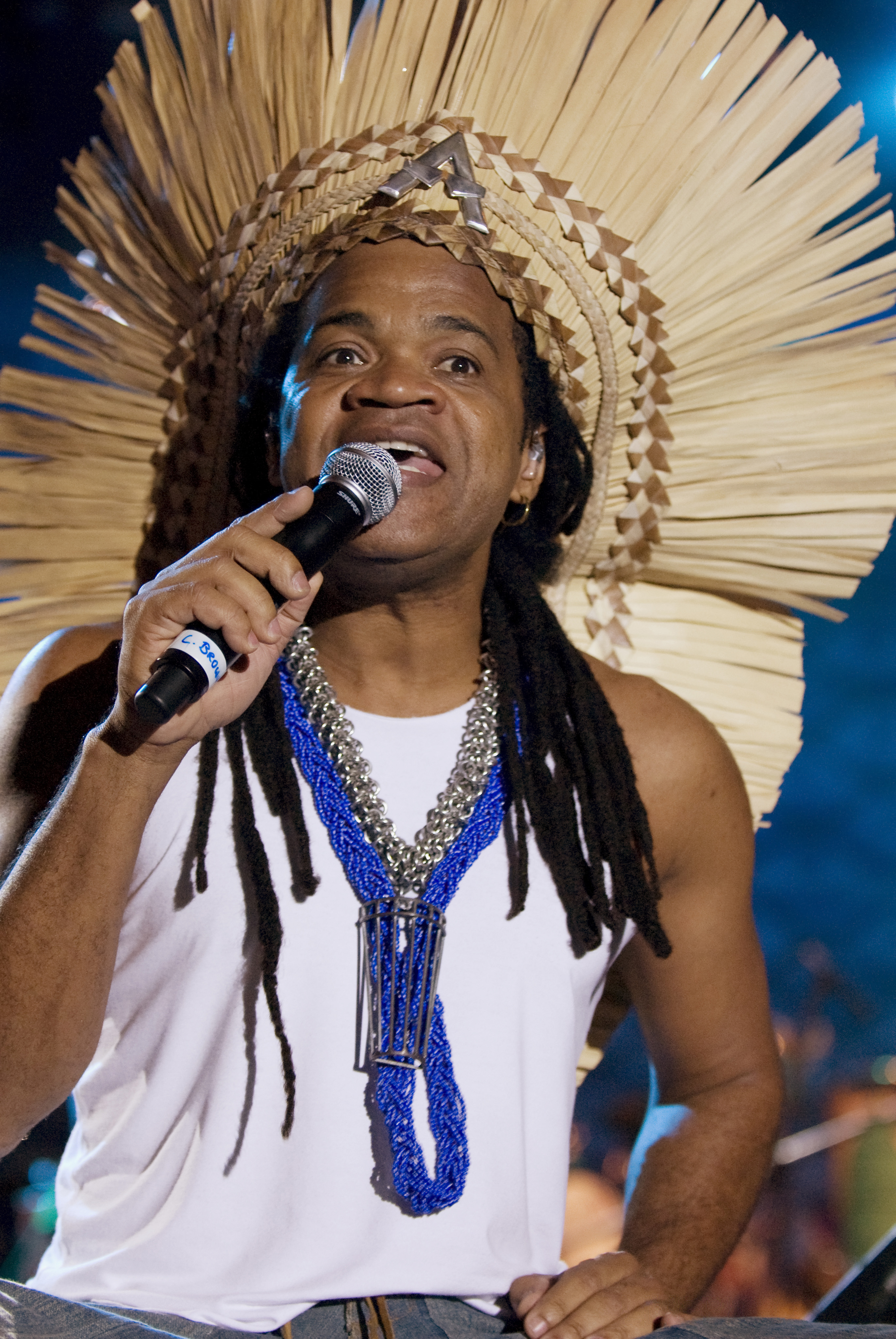
Carlinhos Brown

=== Theme ===
"The Survival and Innovation of Crafts"

=== Laureates ===
- Wang Shixiang (China) (Principal Award), art collector and poet
- The 2002 Arab Human Development Report from notably Nader Fergany (Egypt)
- Mathare Youth Sports Association (Kenya), a development aid organization
- Carlinhos Brown (Brazil), singer-songwriter and percussionist
- Lita Stantic (Argentina), filmmaker
- District Six Museum (South Africa), a museum on apartheid in South Africa
- Hasan Saltık (Turkey), music producer
- Mick Pearce (Zimbabwe), architect
- Reyum Institute of Arts and Culture (Cambodia), art and culture institute
- G. N. Devy (India), tribal researcher, writer and literary critic
- Yovita Meta (Indonesia), fashion designer and artisan

=== Committee ===
Adriaan van der Staay, Aracy Amaral, Sadik Al-Azm, Goenawan Mohamad, Pedro Pimenta, Claudia Roden, Bruno Stagno.

== The 2004 Prince Claus Awards ==
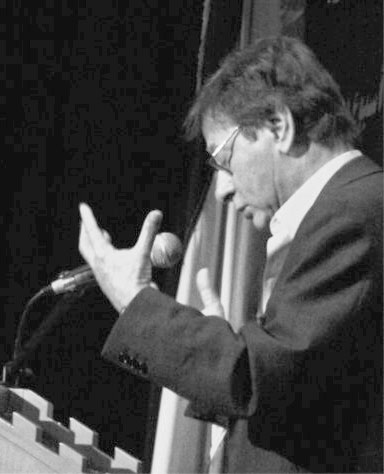
Mahmoud Darwish

=== Theme ===
"The positive results of Asylum and Migration"

=== Laureates ===
- Mahmoud Darwish (Palestine) (Principal Award), poet and writer
- Jawad al-Assadi (Iraq), theater maker and poet
- Tin Moe (Burma), poet
- Ivaldo Bertazzo (Brazil), dancer and choreographer
- Bhutan Archery Federation (Bhutan), cultural archery society
- Halet Çambel (Turkey), archeologist
- Omara Khan Massoudi (Afghanistan), museum director
- Memoria Abierta (Argentina), human rights organization
- Farroukh Qasim (Tajikistan), theater maker
- Aminata Traoré (Mali), writer and political activist

=== Committee ===
Adriaan van der Staay, Aracy Amaral, Sadik Al-Azm, Goenawan Mohamad, Pedro Pimenta, Claudia Roden, Bruno Stagno.

== The 2005 Prince Claus Awards ==
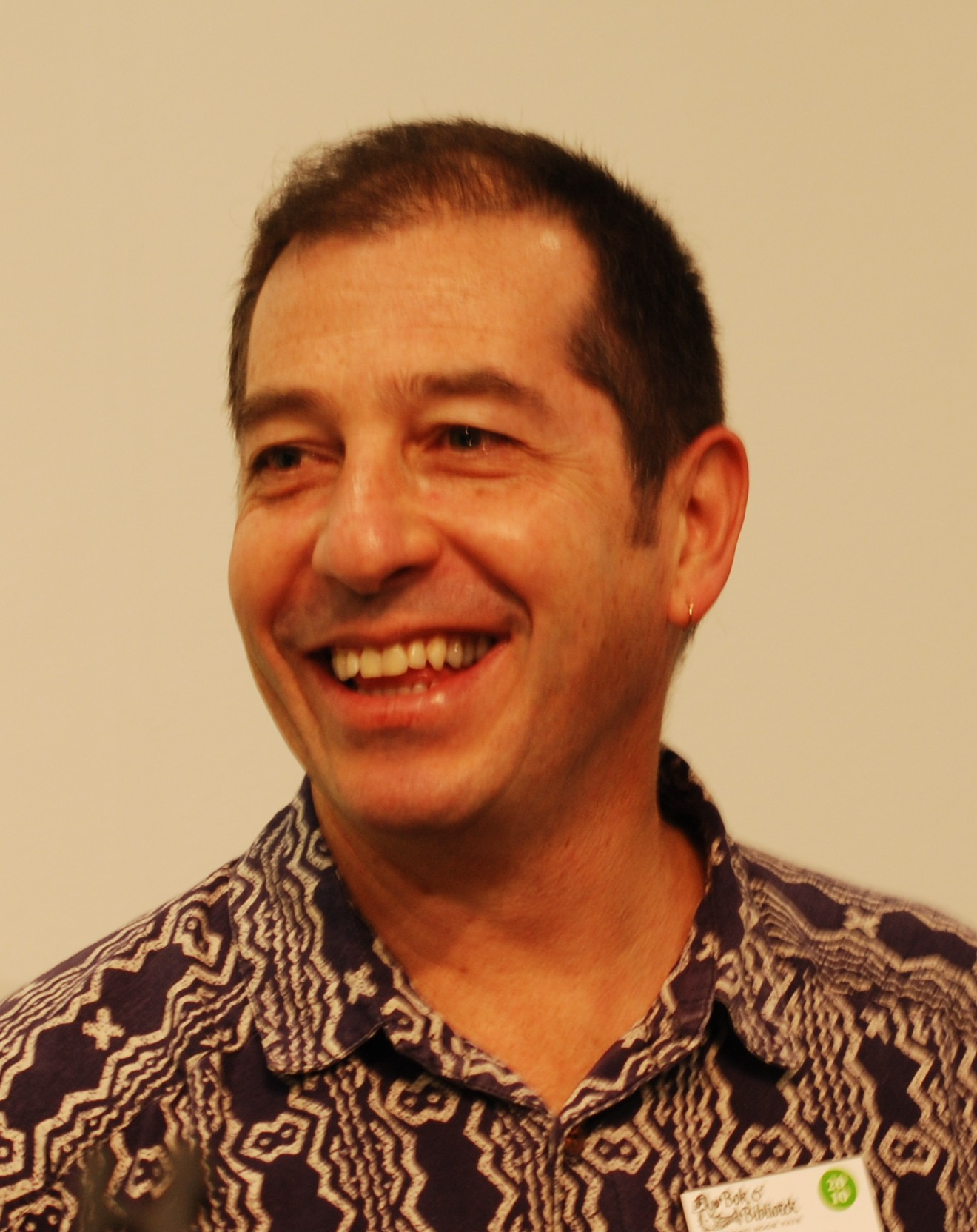
Jonathan Shapiro

=== Theme ===
"Humour and Satire"

=== Laureates ===
- Jonathan Shapiro, alias Zapiro (South Africa) (Principal Award), cartoonist
- Lenin El-Ramly (Egypt), writer and director
- Slamet Gundono (Indonesia), wayang puppeteer and artist
- Edgar Langeveldt (Zimbabwe), stand-up comedian, singer-songwriter and actor
- Michael Poghosyan (Armenia), actor, singer and cabaret performer
- Joaquín Salvador Lavado, alias Quino (Argentina), cartoonist and comic strip artist
- Ebrahim Nabavi (Iran), writer and satirist
- Chéri Samba (D.R. Congo), artist painter
- Niède Guidon (Brazil), archeologist
- Abdul Sheriff (Tanzania), museum director
- Opiyo Okach (Kenya), dancer and choreographer

=== Committee ===
Niek Biegman, Aracy Amaral, Sadik Al-Azm, Goenawan Mohamad, Pedro Pimenta, Claudia Roden, Mick Pearce.

== The 2006 Prince Claus Awards ==
=== Theme ===
"10 years of the Prince Claus Awards" (recapitulating visual arts, writing and publishing, theater, cultural education and debate, cultural heritage and education)

=== Laureates ===
- Reza Abedini (Iran) (Principal Award), graphical artist and art critic
- Lida Abdul (Afghanistan), visual artist, videographer and photographer
- Christine Tohmé (Lebanon), curator and art promoter
- Erna Brodber (Jamaica), writer and sociologist
- Henry Chakava (Kenya), publisher
- Frankétienne (Haiti), writer, poet, dramatist, musician and artist painter
- Madeeha Gauhar (Pakistan), actress, writer, theater maker and women rights activist
- Michael Mel (Papua New Guinea), art scientist, curator, philosopher, musician and playwright
- Committee for Relevant Art (Nigeria), art platform
- Al Kamandjâti Association (Palestine), a musical development organization
- National Museum of Mali, archeological and ethnological museum

=== Committee ===
Selma Al-Radi, Manthia Diawara, Pablo Ortiz Monasterio, Amitav Ghosh, Virginia Pérez-Ratton, Mick Pearce, Niek Biegman.

== The 2007 Prince Claus Awards ==
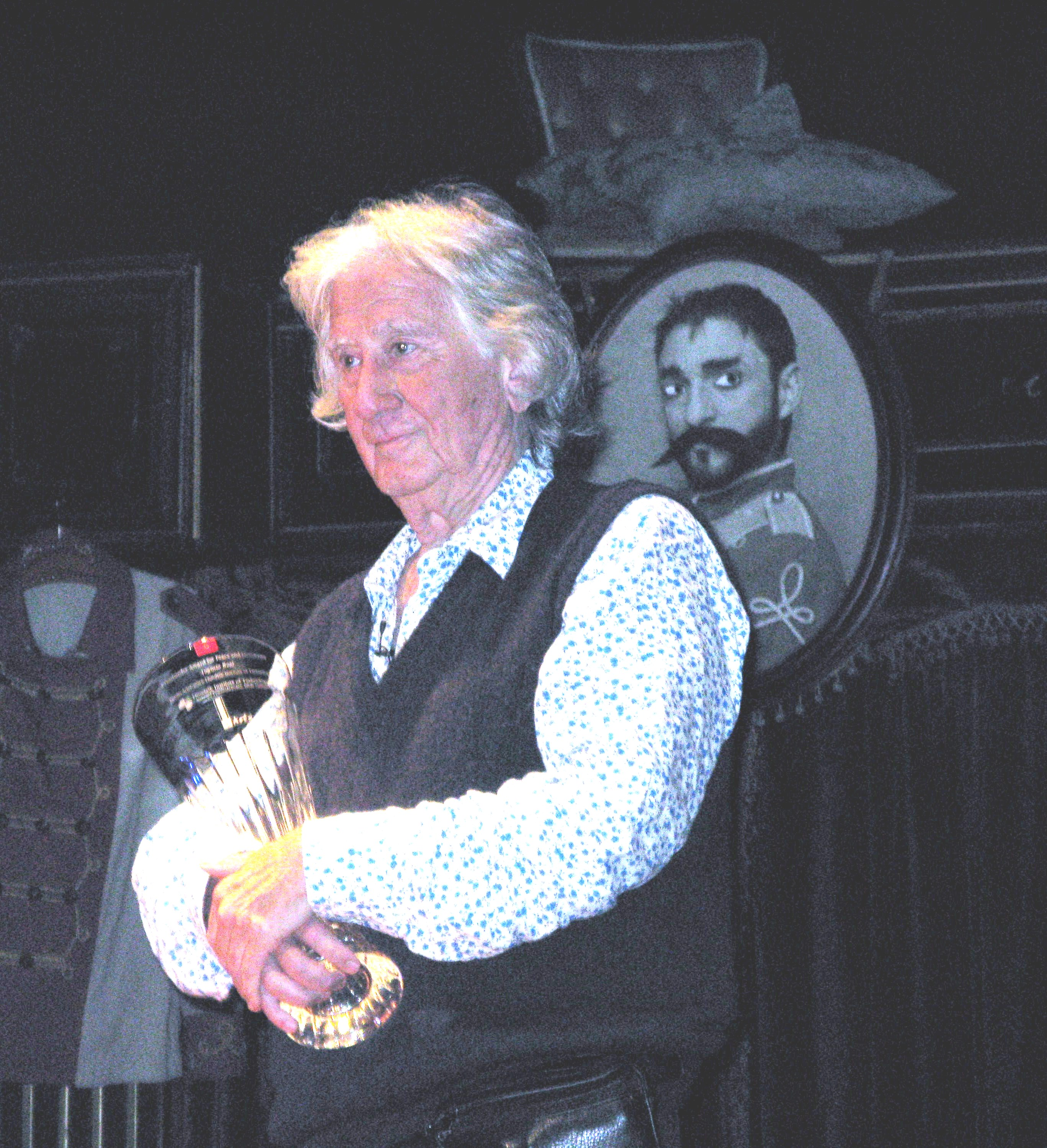
Augusto Boal

=== Theme ===
"Culture and Conflict"

=== Laureates ===
- Faustin Linyekula (D.R. Congo) (Principal Award), dancer and choreographer
- Patricia Ariza (Colombia), poet and actress
- Augusto Boal (Brazil), theater maker
- Emily Jacir (Palestine), visual artist
- Hollis Liverpool, alias Chalkdust (Trinidad and Tobago), calypso singer and writer
- Sudanese Writers Union (Sudan)
- Ars Aevi (Bosnia and Herzegovina), museum of art
- Oscar Hagerman (Mexico), architect and designer
- Harutyun Khachatryan (Armenia), filmmaker
- Godfrey Mwampembwa, alias Gado (Kenya), cartoonist
- Radio Isanganiro (Burundi), human rights promoter and radio station

=== Committee ===
Peter Geschiere, Manthia Diawara, Pablo Ortiz Monasterio, Mick Pearce, Virginia Pérez-Ratton, Selma Al-Radi.

== The 2008 Prince Claus Awards ==
=== Theme ===
"Culture and the Human Body"

=== Laureates ===
- Mamoni Raisom Goswami (India) (Principal Award), writer and poet
- Li Xianting (China), art critic
- Ganchugiyn Purevbat (Mongolia), artist painter, museum director and lama
- Ousmane Sow (Senegal), sculptor
- Dayanita Singh (India), photographer
- Elia Suleiman (Palestine), filmmaker
- James Iroha Uchechukwu (Nigeria), photographer
- Tania Bruguera (Cuba), visual artist
- Ma Ke (China), fashion designer
- Jeanguy Saintus (Haiti), dancer and choreographer
- Carlos Henríquez Consalvi (Venezuela/El Salvador), radio broadcaster and museum director

== The 2009 Prince Claus Awards ==
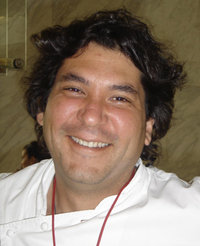
Gastón Acurio

=== Theme ===
«Culture and Nature»

=== Laureates ===
- Simón Vélez - (Colombia) (Principal Award), architect
- El Anatsui - (Ghana), sculptor
- Doual'art - (Cameroon), an art organization
- Liang Shaoji - (China), conceptual artist
- Jivya Soma Mashe - (India), visual artist
- Sammy Baloji - (D.R. Congo), photographer
- Santu Mofokeng - (South Africa), photographer
- Kanak Dixit - (Nepal), publisher and writer
- Institute of History of Nicaragua and Central America - (Nicaragua)
- Desiderio Navarro - (Cuba), art and culture critic
- Gastón Acurio - (Peru), cook and gastronomist

== The 2010 Prince Claus Awards ==
=== Theme ===
« Borders to reality »

=== Laureates ===
- Barzakh Editions (Algeria) (Principal Award), independent publisher
- Decolonizing Architecture institute (DAi, Palestine), architectonic institute
- Jia Zhangke (China), filmmaker, actor and writer
- Kwani Trust (Kenya), literary platform and magazine
- Ana Maria Machado (Brazil), painter and writer
- Yoani Sánchez (Cuba), blogger and human rights activist
- Maya Goded (Mexico), photographer
- Kasmalieva & Djumaliev (Kyrgyzstan), a visual artist couple
- Dinh Q. Lê (Vietnam), visual artist and photographer
- Mehrdad Oskouei (Iran), documentary maker
- Aung Zaw (Thailand), publisher

== The 2011 Prince Claus Awards ==
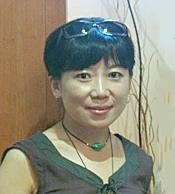
Woeser

=== Theme ===
«Breaking taboos»

=== Laureates ===
- Ntone Edjabe for Chimurenga (Pan-Africa) (Principal Award), DJ, writer and publisher
- Said Atabekov, (Kazakhstan), visual artist, videographer and photographer
- The Book Café, (Zimbabwe), a platform for free cultural expression
- Nidia Bustos, (Nicaragua), cultural activist and theatre director
- Rena Effendi, (Azerbaijan), photographer
- Regina José Galindo, (Guatemala), body and performance artist
- Ilkhom Theatre, (Uzbekistan), independent theater
- Kettly Mars, (Haiti), poet and writer
- Rabih Mroué, (Lebanon), theater maker and visual artist
- Riwaq, (Palestine), architectonic organization
- Woeser, (Tibet; China), writer, poet and blogger

== The 2012 Prince Claus Awards ==
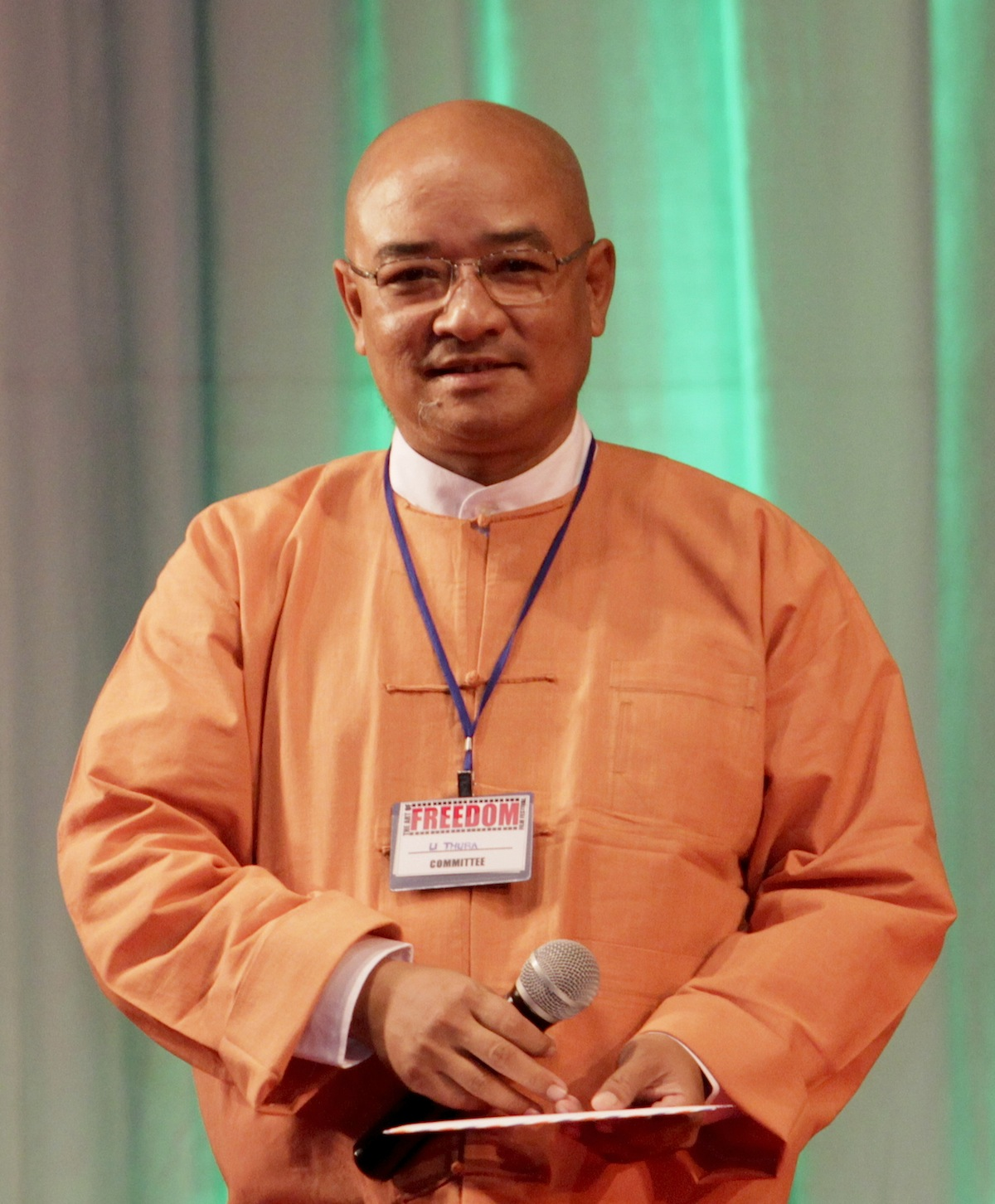
Zarganar

=== Theme ===
«Frontiers of Reality »

=== Laureates ===
- Eloísa Cartonera (Argentina) (Principal Award), cooperation of designers and writers
- Sami Ben Gharbia, (Tunisia), internet activist
- Habiba Djahnine, (Algeria), film producer, film festival curator and essayist
- Yassin al-Haj Saleh, (Syria), writer and dissident
- Widad Kawar, (Jordan), collector and researcher of Arab clothing and jewellery
- Teresa Margolles, (Mexico), photographer, videographer and performance artist
- Boniface Mwangi, (Kenya), press photographer and peace activist
- Phare Ponleu Selpak, (Cambodia), a cultural community organization
- Ian Randle, (Jamaica), independent publisher
- Maung Thura, alias Zarganar, (Burma), comedian and filmmaker
- Mohamed Ibrahim Warsame, alias Hadraawi, (Somaliland), poet and songwriter

== The 2013 Prince Claus Awards ==
=== Laureates ===
- Ahmed Fouad Negm, (Egypt) (Principal Award), poet and critic
- Alejandro Zambra, (Chile), writer
- Carla Fernández, (Mexico), fashion designer and cultural historian
- Christopher Cozier, (Trinidad and Tobago), multi-media artist and cultural activator
- Idrissou Mora-Kpaï, (Benin), documentary filmmaker
- Lu Guang, (China), photographer
- Naiza Khan, (Pakistan), a visual artist
- Recycled Orchestra of Cateura, (Paraguay), youth orchestra
- Óscar Muñoz, (Colombia), visual artist
- Teater Garasi, (Indonesia), performing arts
- Zanele Muholi, (South Africa), photographer and visual activist

== The 2014 Prince Claus Awards ==
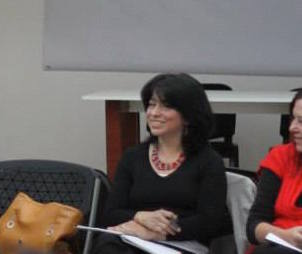
Rosina Cazali (Guatemala, 2013)

=== Laureates ===
- Ignacio Agüero (Chile), (Principal Award), filmmaker
- Rosina Cazali, (Guatemala), writer and curator
- Lav Diaz, (Philippines), filmmaker
- FX Harsono, (Indonesia), visual artist
- Gülsün Karamustafa, (Turkey), visual artist
- Tran Luong, (Vietnam), media artist
- Museo Itinerante Arte por la Memoria, (Peru), an art collective
- Lia Rodrigues, (Brazil), choreographer
- SPARROW Sound & Picture Archives for Research on Women, (India), women's archive

== The 2015 Prince Claus Awards ==
=== Laureates ===
- Newsha Tavakolian (Iran), (Principal Award), photojournalist
- Latif Al-Ani (Iraq), photographer
- Amakhosi (Zimbabwe), a community-oriented theatre group and cultural hub
- Jelili Atiku (Nigeria), performance artist
- Jean Pierre Bekolo (Cameroon), filmmaker
- ETCETERA (Argentina/Chile), art collective
- Perhat Khaliq (China), musician and singer-songwriter
- Fatos Lubonja (Albania), author, editor and public intellectual
- Ossama Mohammed (Syria), filmmaker
- Oksana Shatalova (Kazakhstan), visual artist and curator
- Y'en A Marre (Senegal), a collective of young musicians and journalists

=== Committee ===
Bregtje van der Haak, Suad Amiry, Salah Hassan, Kettly Mars, Ong Ken Sen, Gabriela Salgado

== The 2016 Prince Claus Awards ==
=== Laureates ===
- Apichatpong Weerasethakul (Thailand), (Principal Award), filmmaker
- Kamal Mouzawak (Lebanon), chef and food activist
- The Second Floor (T2F) (Pakistan), interdisciplinary cultural centre
- Bahia Shehab (Egypt/Lebanon), graphic designer, artist, educator
- La Silla Vacía (The Empty Chair) (Colombia), interactive online portal
- Vo Trong Nghia (Vietnam), architect

=== Committee ===
Emile Fallaux, Sheikha Hoor Al Qasimi, Dinh Q Lê, Visual Artist, Neo Muyanga, Manuel de Rivero, Suely Rolnik

== The 2017 Prince Claus Awards ==
=== Laureates ===
- Vincent Carelli (Brazil) (Principal Award), filmmaker
- Ma Jun (China) (Principal Award), environmental activist
- Khadija Al-Salami (filmmaker, Yemen)
- L’Art Rue (art collective, Tunisia)
- Brigitte Baptiste (scientist, Colombia)
- Amar Kanwar (film director, India)
- Diébédo Francis Kéré (architect, Burkina Faso)

== The 2018 Prince Claus Awards ==
=== Theme ===
‘Louder than Words’

The Next Generation Award is presented to the recipient to honour a creative initiative that provides a material contribution to the lives and possibilities of young people.

=== Laureates ===
- Market Photo Workshop, (South Africa), (Principal Award), Training institute and cultural platform
- Dada Masilio (South Africa) (Next Generation Award)(dancer and choreographer)
- Adong Judith (playwright, film and theatre-maker, Uganda)
- Marwa al-Sabouri (architect and urban thinker, Syria)
- Kidlat Tahimik (artist in many disciplines, Philippines)
- Eka Kurniawan (writer, Indonesia),
- O Menelick 2 Ato (independent platform, Brazil)

== The 2019 Prince Claus Awards ==
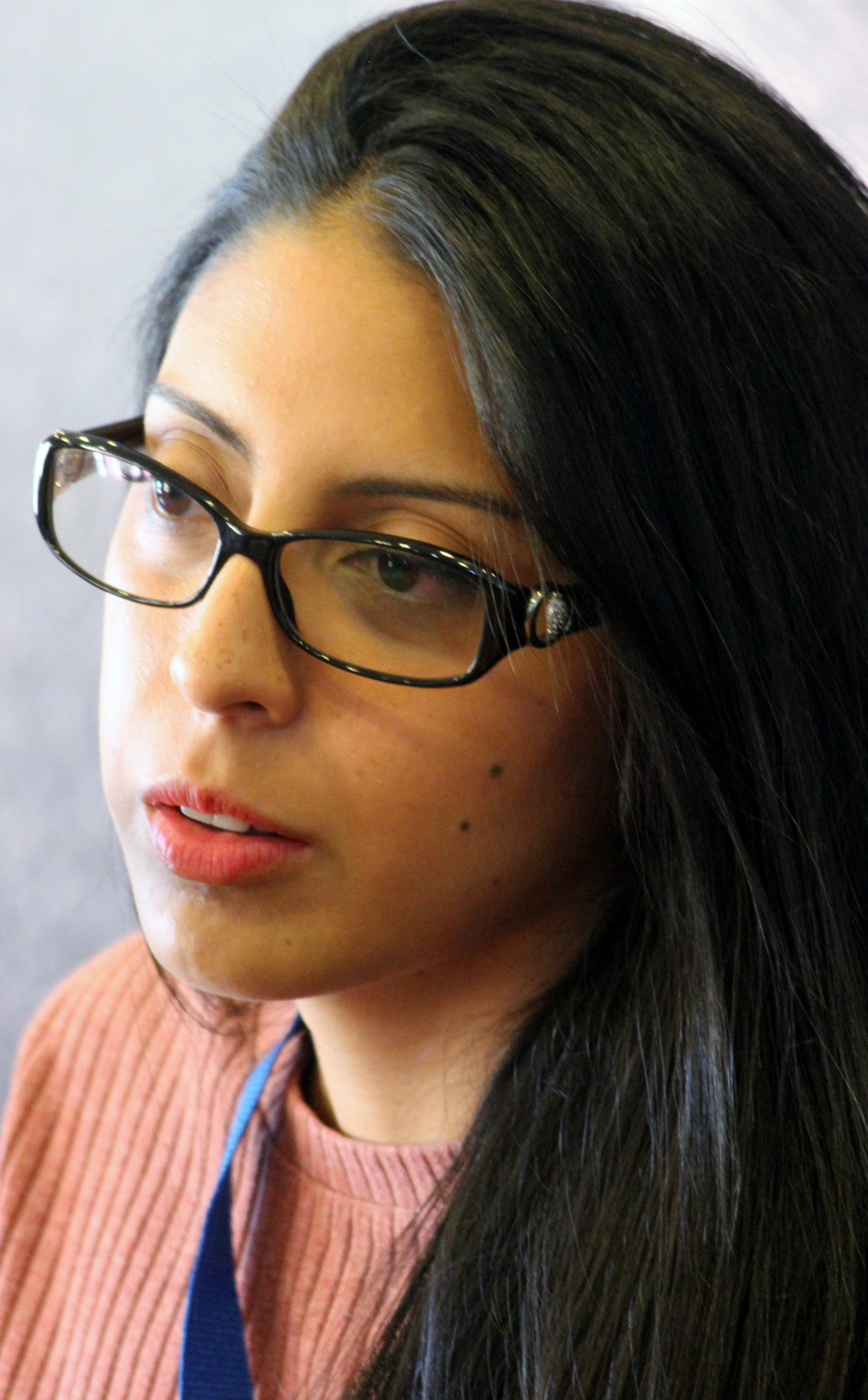
Mónica Ojeda

=== Laureates ===
- Kamala Ibrahim Ishaq, (Sudan) (Principal Award)
- Ambulante (documentaries, Mexico)
- Mariam Kamara (architect, Niger)
- Bill Kouélany (artist & writer, Congo-Brazzaville)
- Djamila Ribeiro (philosopher, Brazil)
- Anocha Suwichakornpong (filmmaker, Thailand)
- Mónica Ojeda Franco (writer, Ecuador), Next Generation Laureate

== The 2020 Prince Claus Awards ==
=== Laureates ===
- Ibrahim Mahama, (Ghana, Visual Arts) (Principal Award)
- Açik Radyo, (Turkey, Media)
- Diamantina Arcoiris, (Colombia, Design)
- Fendika Cultural Center, (Ethiopia, Music and performance)
- Tunakaimanu Fielakepa, (Tonga, Cultural Heritage)
- m7red, (Argentina, Architecture).
