= Djahnine =

Djahnine is a surname. Notable people with the surname include:

- Farid Djahnine (born 1976), Algerian footballer
- Habiba Djahnine (born 1968), Algerian film producer
