= Marcelo Araúz Lavadenz =

Bolivian festival director

Marcelo Araúz Lavadenz (born October 29, 1934, in Santa Cruz de la Sierra), is a Bolivian festival director, culture promoter, choir leader and music educator.

He spent his youth on the lowlands of Palmar de las Islas. He studied sociology at the Katholic University of Leuven in Belgium.

Araúz worked initially for the French Alliance française and the Casa de la Cultura Raúl Otero Reiche in Santa Cruz. Then he became secretary-general for the Asociación Pro Arte y Cultura (Apac), a Bolivian organization for the promotion of art and culture. Furthermore, he is the founder of Urubichá Choir that is dedicated to baroque music. The baroque in the region of Santa Cruz developed under the influence of old culture exchanges with the local Indigenous people.

He is director of two biannual international festivals in Bolivia in the field of music and theater: the Festival Internacional de Música Barroca y Renacentista "Misiones de Chiquitos" and the Festival Internacional de Santa Cruz de la Sierra.

Araúz was rewarded with prizes several times. One of them was the Prince Claus Award from the Netherlands in 2002. Furthermore he received the highest award of Bolivia in 2003, in the Order of the Condor of the Andes.
