= Jawad al-Assadi =

Iraqi theater director, playwright, theater researcher and poet

Jawad al-Assadi is an Iraqi theater director, playwright, theater researcher and poet.

Al-Assadi was born on January 12, 1947, in Karbala. While still a child, he moved with his parents to Baghdad. Here he went to the art academy until 1976. In this particular year, during the rise of Saddam Hussein, he decided to continue his study in Sofia, the capital of the People's Republic of Bulgaria. Here he specialized in theater direction.

He directs pieces of Arab soil, like from writers as Saadallah Wannous, Moueen Bessissou, Mahmoud Darwish and Mahmoud Diab, as well as from European playwrights, like Jean Genet, Anton Chekhov and Bertolt Brecht.

Al-Assadi co-operates with theater groups and actors in various Arab countries. He has developed a renewing vision on theater and educates actors in theater profession as well. Furthermore, he has written several theater pieces, poems and essays, and researches theater repetition and performance.

He has fulfilled his career greatly in exile and, after the invasion of Iraq, he decided around 2004/05 to return, in order to participate in the positive development of his country. During his stay, he staged the piece Woman of War that later was shown abroad as well, for instance in London, Oman and Syria. Furthermore, he was an advisor for the Ministries of Culture of Iraq and of Abu Dhabi.

In 2004 he was honored with a Prince Claus Award from the Netherlands, for his dedication to freedom of cultural expression in the Arab world. Nevertheless, the return to his home country was temporary. When his attempts to put culture back on the Iraqi agenda failed, he decided to move to Beirut.

His temporary return and his impression of the American presence in his country, inspired him to write the piece Baghdadi Bath. This piece was staged in New York City in 2009. Other work of him have been translated into English as well, and also in French and Russian.
