= Michael Mel =

- Born: 1959 (age 65–66); Wila, near Mount Hagen, Western Highlands Province, Papua New Guinea
- Education: Educated by the Sisters of Mercy
- Occupation(s): Academic, curator, philosopher, musician, playwright
- Employer: University of Goroka
- Known for: Visual and performance art, body painting, preservation of Chanted Tales
- Awards: Prince Claus Award (2006)

Michael Mel is a Papua New Guinean academic in visual arts at the University of Goroka, curator, philosopher, musician and playwright. Mel was born in 1959 in Wila near Vulcano Hagan in the Western Highlands.

== Early life ==
Michael Mel born in 1959, was from Wila village, Mount Hagen. His father had great memory remembering family history up to 5 generations. His parents never tasted rice and bread, and Michael revealed he grew up on kaukau (sweet potatoes). He went to school with Sisters of Mercy.

== Career ==
As an artist Mel principally specialized in performance and installation art and body painting. Furthermore, he is known for his Chanted Tales, traditional historic stories of local people that serve for passing social responsibility and morality. Mel exerted himself to it that people obtained access to them again, since they had fallen into oblivion since English language had become the principal language in the country.

== Awards ==
In 2006 Mel was honored with a Prince Claus Award for his key role in the cultural development of the communities of the highlands of Papua New Guinea.
