= Oscar Hagerman =

Mexican architect and designer (born 1936)

Oscar Hagerman Mosquera is a Mexican architect and designer. Hagerman was born in 1936 in Coruña, Spain. He has been a professor in architecture and design at the National Autonomous University of Mexico.

The knowledge of native cultures plays an important role in his designs. He combines traditional esthetics with contemporary technology, and works closely together with the indigenous people. His work includes the development of houses, schools, social centers, an ecotourism hotel, an intercultural university for the Indigenous Ayüük people, and more. He designed more than buildings alone. Especially his designs of chairs are widely known.

In 2007 Hagerman was honored with a Prince Claus Award from the Netherlands within the theme Culture and conflict. The jury praised him for his "engaged approach to architecture and design for indigenous communities, and for bridging the gap between sophisticated design and people’s needs".

== Bibliography ==
- 1979: Design in the Service of Mankind (paper)
- 1992: Haciendas Poblanas, edited by Mariana Yampolsky, with research and text of Ricardo Rendón Garcini, ASIN B0017WS2CS
- 1995: Casas Acariciadoras: Arquitectura Rural, with Mariana Yampolsky, ISBN 978-9728176204
- 2014: "Oscar Hagerman. Arquitectura y diseño", with texts of Elena Poniatowska, Oscar Hagerman, Paloma Vera (Spanish & English) Ed. Arquine & Conaculta. ISBN 978-607-7784-73-9
