= Omara Khan Massoudi =

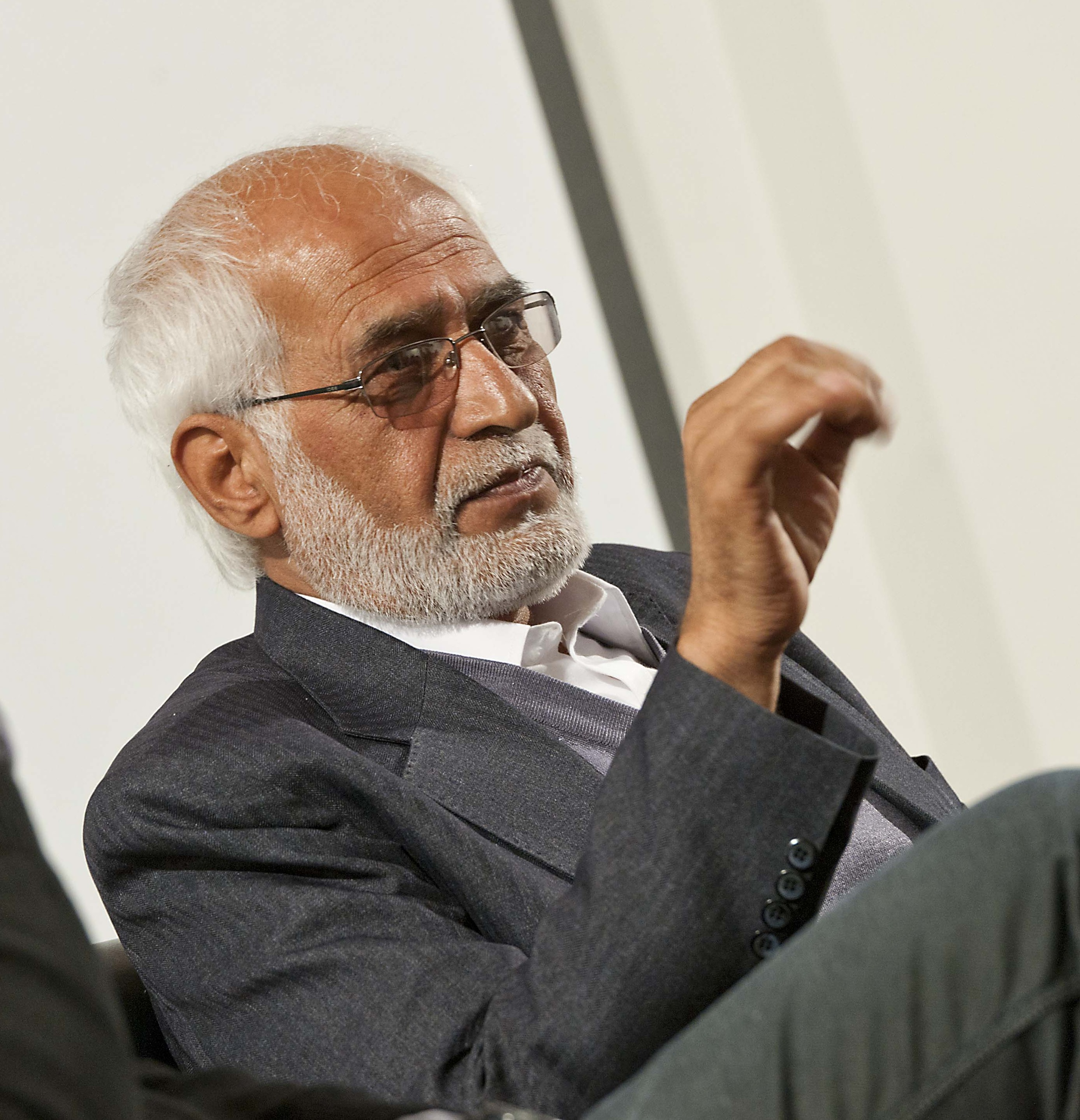
Omara Khan Massoudi in 2012

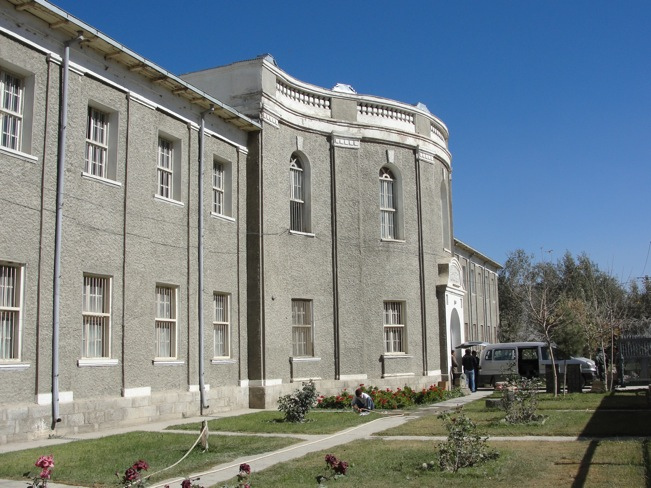
The National Museum of Afghanistan, 2010

Omara Khan Massoudi is an Afghan museum director. He was born in 1948. He helped save more than 20,000 valuable museum artworks to safety. In 1964 he won the Prince Claus Award.

== Education ==
Massoudi studied History and Geography at Kabul University. After he obtained his degree, he was a teacher in the first four years of his career. Subsequently, he did four months of research for the Ministry of Information and Culture, and then he was employed at the National Museum of Afghanistan in Kabul, which was known by the name Kabul Museum at that time.

When the Russian troops started to leave the country in May 1988, it appeared to be clear that the artifacts of the museum were at risk from the approaching rebels. In cooperation with President Mohammad Najibullah, the artifacts were transferred to safe locations, where they stayed in the years to come. From 1992 to 1994, the museum suffered heavily under the fierce shellings, particularly the rocket strike of May 12, 1993.

In 2001, Massoudi was appointed director of the museum, and in 2003, he was able to inform President Hamid Karzai of the safeguarded artifacts. In spite of his actions, still around 70% of all artifacts got lost because of destruction or plundering by the rebels.

In 2004 Massoudi was honored with a Prince Claus Award from the Netherlands, for his share in the rehabilitation of the museum and the prevention of lootings of important cultural and historic locations. In 2008, he was in Amsterdam at a special exhibition of artifacts of the National Museum of Kabul.

Under Massoudi's direction, his museum revives with a growing number of visitors: 16,000 in 2010 and 23,000 in 2011.

Massoudi received an honorary Doctorate of Humane Letters degree from New York University on May 22, 2013.
