= Yovita Meta =

Indonesian fashion designer and crafts artist

Yovita Meta is an Indonesian fashion designer and crafts artist.

Meta was born on December 4, 1955, in Kefamenanu, West Timor. In 1990 she founded the nonprofit organization Sanggar Biboki (Tafaen Pah Foundation).

Her initiative was received enthusiastically and within some ten years her organization grew to 406 women weavers in 25 self-managing groups. With her organization she revived and updated old techniques of hand spinning of cotton and natural dye-stuffs, and the development of synthetic dyes. Next to that she keeps up working with local styles and techniques, such as ikat, tapestry weaving and supplementary weft. By means of workshops and training her foundation has dedicated itself for high quality standards.

In 1992 her work was rewarded with the Upakarta Prize of the Indonesian government, for her hard work in developing home industry in her birthplace. In 2003 she was honored with a Prince Claus Award from the Netherlands, for her renovating designs and her modernization of old techniques.
