= Tunakaimanu Fielakepa =

Tongan textile expert

- Born: 1936 (age 89–90)
- Other names: Dowager Lady Fielakepa
- Occupation: Educationalist
- Known for: Promotion of textiles produced by Tongan women
- Spouse: Lord Fielakepa

Tunakaimanu Fielakepa is the foremost authority on koloa, the unique hand-made textiles produced by women in Tonga. She promotes the revitalisation of traditional techniques and practices both in Tonga and in other Pacific Island communities.

== Early life ==
Tunakaimanu Fielakepa was born in 1936. She was one of the first Tongan women to receive a western-style education, and became a teacher in 1958. She married Longolongoʻatumai Aleamotuʻa, Lord Fielakepa, in 1959 and after his death was able to use the title, the Dowager Lady Fielakepa. Her son, Baron Fielakepa, became a government minister and Tonga's Lord Chamberlain, the most senior officer of the Royal Household.

== Career ==
From 1975 to 1978 Fielakepa worked in the Ministry of Education, serving as the Chief Education Officer. She was a technical advisor to the National Council of Women from 1996 to 2013 and president of the Tonga National Handicraft Association from 2009 to 2012. She continues to advise the Langafonua Handicrafts Centre, a shop in the centre of Tonga's capital, Nuku'alofa, that sells handicrafts produced by women, with which she has been involved since 1953.

== Support for koloa development ==
Koloa, which translates as "value", is a term to describe textiles made by Tongan women. These take many forms, including ngatu, widely known in the Pacific as tapa cloth, which is made from bark and inscribed with intricate patterns and symbols; ta’ovala, which are mats woven from strips of pandanus leaves; and kafa, which is braided coconut fibre or, sometimes, human hair. Some koloa are used on a daily basis while others are saved for ceremonial occasions.

Like all Tongan women, Fielakepa first became aware of the art of ngatu at an early age by watching her grandmother and a group of friends making it. It was not until 1959, as a married woman, that she learned the art of barkcloth and discovered local variations in practices and the meanings of some of the designs and symbols used in the different islands of Tonga. She has been instructing women's groups on various techniques since then. Her research is featured in the 2014 UNESCO anthology Traditional Knowledge and Wisdom: Themes from the Pacific Islands, as well as in Tapa: From Tree Bark to Cloth: An Ancient Art of Oceania, from Southeast Asia to Eastern Polynesia by Michel Charleux.

In 2019 Fielakepa curated ‘Koloa: Women, Art and Technology’, an exhibition of historical and contemporary koloa. After opening in Nuku'alofa, the exhibition went to Para Site in Hong Kong, where it was expanded to include tapa from other countries. Many of the items displayed were part of Fielakepa's private collection, the first occasion items from her collection had been outside Tonga. At the end of 2020, the exhibition was shown at Artspace Aotearoa in Auckland, New Zealand.

== Awards and honours ==
Tunakaimanu Fielakepa was one of the recipients in 2020 of the Prince Claus Awards for culture and its development. The first winner of this award from Oceania, her award was given for:

- her immense contribution to the ongoing vitality of the women's textile arts, demonstrating that koloa is a living cultural form and an integral part of Tongan culture;
- increasing knowledge of koloa through research and documentation, ensuring the preservation of this unique cultural heritage for future generations;
- her commitment to excellence, emphasising the use of traditional materials and techniques to convey the deep meanings and symbolic values of koloa's rich aesthetic lineage;
- highlighting women's significance in society as the creators of koloa, as well as encouraging and supporting women's groups and networks;
- strengthening Tongans' cultural identity by sharing her knowledge of indigenous values with young generations through her role as a teacher;
- upholding Tonga's rich traditional culture, counteracting the colonial legacy that devalued indigenous art forms, and resisting globalisation and neo-colonisation by commercial corporate international style; and
- stimulating better understanding of Pacific cultures by providing expertise and advice to both local and global heritage groups, institutions and academics on their research and collections.
