= Carla Fernández =

Mexican fashion designer

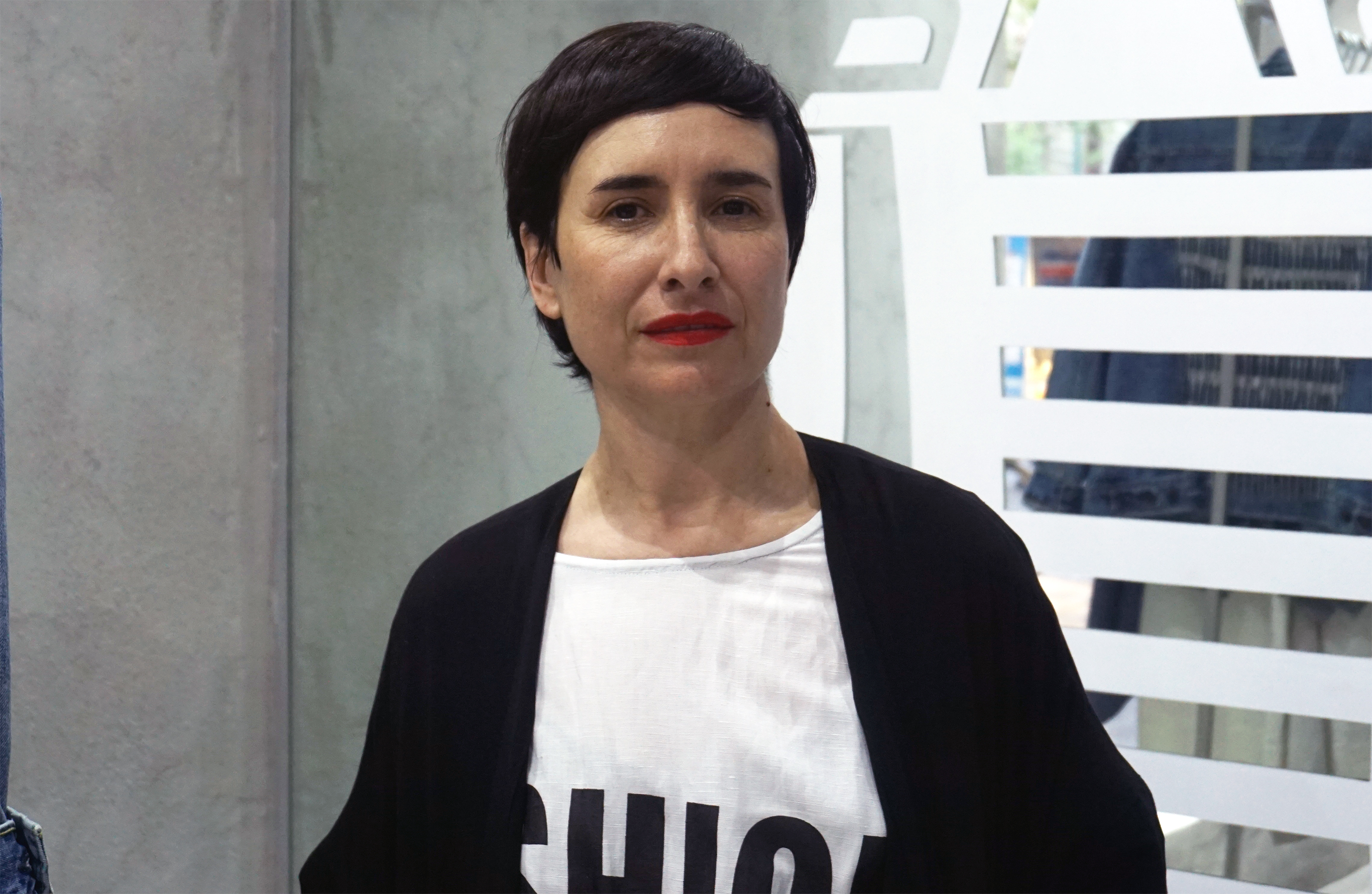
- Born: January 29, 1973 (age 53); Saltillo, Coahuila, Mexico
- Education: Universidad Iberoamericana
- Known for: Mexican Textile
- Label: Carla Fernández
- Awards: Young Fashion Entrepreneur in the Year 2008 by the British Fashion Council; ID 2009 presented her as one of the 40 best designers of the moment internationally; Prince Claus Fund Award 2013

Carla Fernández Tena (born January 29, 1973), known as Carla Fernández, is a Mexican fashion designer from Saltillo, Coahuila, based in Mexico City. She has gained international recognition for her precise approach to documenting and preserving the rich textile heritage of Mexico's indigenous communities by transforming it into abstract contemporary clothing, making a point to demonstrate that tradition is anything but static.

== Early life and career ==
Since her childhood, Carla Fernández has been a fan of Mexican culture. Her father is a historian and traveled to indigenous communities, while her mother visited international fashion centers. Fernández discovered the wealth and potential of Mexican textiles and designs. Her background in art history and fashion design allowed her to study the indigenous dress from a different angle to the anthropological.

With the experience of having worked for Conaculta and Fonart promoting design and development of craft techniques in indigenous communities, she shaped her knowledge in art history from the Universidad Iberoamericana and was named one of the "50 People that move Mexico" by Quién magazine.

== Brand ==
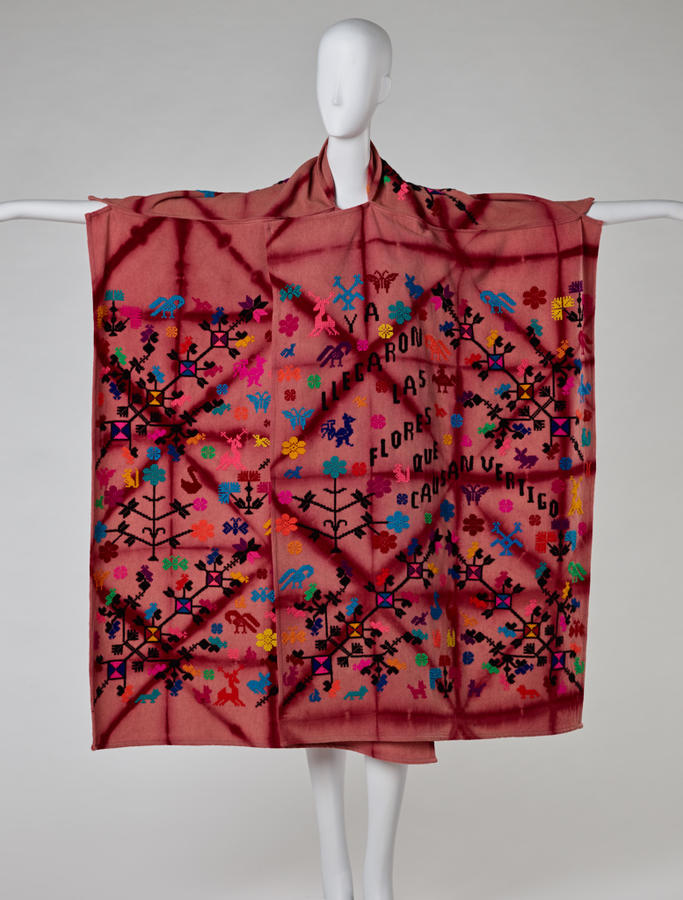
Poncha Poema, 2018. (RISD Museum)

Fernández combines traditional textiles with avant-garde techniques.

Along with her eponymous ready-to-wear clothes — launched in 2000 and inspired by traditional Mexican textiles and geometric patterns — Fernández is the head of Taller Flora, a mobile design laboratory that brings together Mexican designers and indigenous artisans to create couture and ready-to-wear collections. The initiative aims to showcase a Mexican style that is simultaneously modern and ancient, pushing the boundaries of fashion while remaining true to its roots.

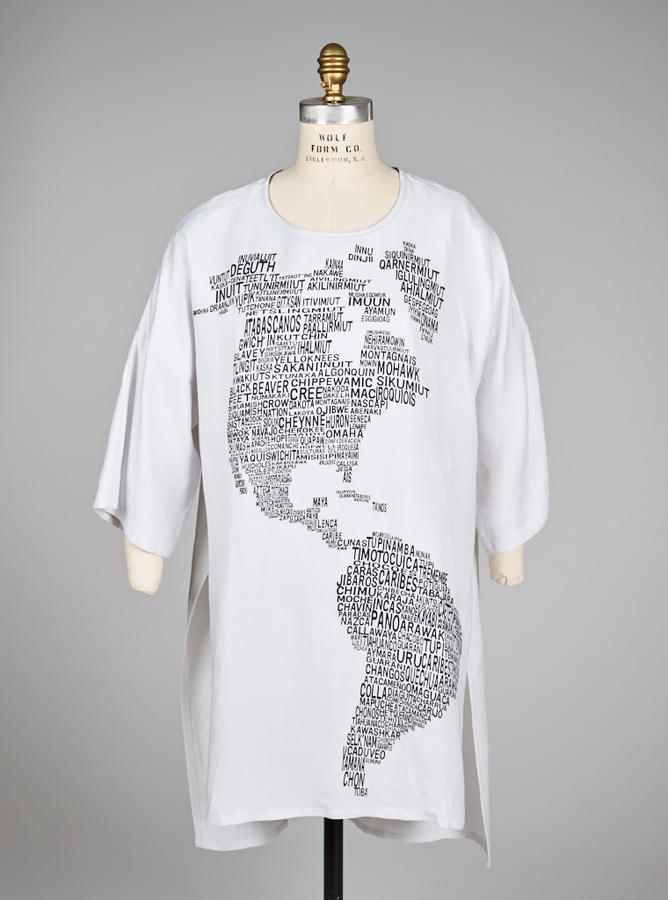
Fernández's 2018 "Indigenous Americas Map Tunic"

Her work combines contemporary fashion with traditional indigenous clothing systems, emphasizing geometric construction and collaboration with artisan communities. This style is the result of 15 years of experience studying the Mexican Apparel, perceiving in it a striking design potential. Her line takes its roots in the same way that the French make their fashion inspired by royalty or the Japanese in the Kimono. The brand garments reflect the sophisticated system of indigenous clothing based on the use of the square and rectangle, and works to create contemporary garments that give a new dimension to the body and break the stereotypes that are exported to Mexico. The reinterpretation of this complex system, and working directly with artisans, is the hallmark of the brand, for which the tradition is not static fashion.

In response to the COVID-19 pandemic, Fernández teamed up with ten artisans from Michoacan, Colima, Oaxaca, Chiapas, and Guerrero to make ecological face masks based upon traditional wooden masks.

== Exhibitions ==
The Denver Art Museum - 2022 “a Mexican Fashion Manifesto”

- "The Barefoot Designer: A workshop to Unlearn" - Museo Jumex, Mexico City - 2016
- "The Future is Handmade! Fashion + Art + Home" - Red Desert, Downtown Los Angeles CA - 2015
- "Design. Culture. Mexico" - Boiler Room at Heath Ceramics - 2015
- "The Barefoot Designer" - Isabella Stewart Gardner Museum - 2014
- "Design from 5 Continents" - The New World UK
- Museum of Craft and Folk Art
- Cultural Centre Spain
- Cultural Agents Harvard
- Musac Spain
- Ethnical Fashion Show Paris
- "Carla Fernández: Stitching Communities" - MIT

== Awards and recognitions ==
The brand has been recognized by two strengths: being at the forefront of design and its business models reflection of its social vision. Fernández was awarded the international prize Young Fashion Entrepreneur in the Year 2008 by the British Fashion Council and the magazine ID in 2009 presented her as one of the 40 best designers of the moment internationally. The idea of craft-industrial production has been exhibited in lectures at universities such as Harvard, MIT, Fashion Institute of Technology (FIT), Universidad Iberoamericana and the Institute of Contemporary Arts in London.

Her designs have been published in several books, including Fashioning Fabrics by Sandy Black and The Air is Blue by Hans Ulrich Obristy. Among the fashion publications in which her work has appeared are ELLE, Vogue, In Fashion, ID, Harper's Bazaar and Wallpaper. Mexican newspapers, including Reforma and Excelsior, have recognized the brand and highlighted its main strength, which is that it has a product with creative and original design, able to interweave past and tradition, artisans and designers to fashion and its future.
