= Jelili Atiku =

Nigerian artist

Jelili Atiku is a multimedia performance artist and sculptor from Lagos, Nigeria. His performance with drawing, photography, installation sculpture, video and live performance have made him one of the most recognized performance artists from Nigeria around the world. His work is said to have a power which "lies in his use of Yoruba symbols and traditions of his local community"

== Biography ==
Atiku was born on 27 September 1968 in Ejigbo, a town in Lagos State of Nigeria. He got his Bachelor of Arts degree in fine arts from Ahmadu Bello University, Zaria in 1998 and a Master of Arts in visual arts from the University of Lagos, Nigeria, in 2006.

In 1998, taught fine arts at the Federal Government College, Ikot Ekpene, Akwa Ibom, Nigeria. From 2004 to 2005, he was a graduate assistant lecturer, Department of Visual Arts, University of Lagos. From 2011 to 2013 he was a part‐time lecturer of Arts and Industrial Designs Department, Lagos State Polytechnic, Ikorodu, Lagos. In 2018, he became an assistant professor at the Department of Africana Studies/Rite and Reason, Brown University in Providence, Rhode Island.

== Career ==
Atiku's work focuses on human rights and social justice issues, which have oftentimes brought him in conflict with agents of state. After a performance in his hometown of Ejigbo on 18 January, he was arrested and charged to court. The performance, titled Aragamago Must Rid This Land of Terrorism was motivated by a brutal attack on some three women in Ejigbo which he believed was "an abomination" for which the king must perform a public ritual. He was eventually cleared of wrongdoing in the case after pressure was mounted by local and foreign artists and organisations.

In 2012, Atiku collaborated with Helene Aurell (Swedish artist), Nigel Wells (UK/Swedish artist) and PålGunnäs (Norwegian artist) at a performance he titled, “In (ut) Flöde”. He also had collaborations with other artists like Graham Martin at Scarborough, York (United Kingdom); and TOGYG, an artists group run by Bangor Greadigol, based in North Wales.

In 2015, he won the prestigious Prince Claus Award.

In 2017, he was one of the artists representing Nigeria at the Venice Biennale, in Italy.

== Notable exhibitions/performances ==
Aráfẹ́rakù (2013). This exhibition focused on Atiku's meditation on the loss of a father he never met. The word "Aráfẹ́rakù" in Yoruba means "a part of me is missing." The performance took place in an empty space that was covered with wallpaper and a photograph of Atiku's father. "Alone throughout most of the 44 hours representing an hour for each year of his life, the only person that is allowed—albeit briefly—to share in the moment is his mother, creating a trilogy that is almost transcendental." This was followed by a public-facing performance that mimics a Yorùbá burial ceremony "blurring the boundaries between reality and fiction as an attempt is made to attain a state of closure through the public depiction of a universal emotion"

== Others ==
- 2022 (I am) À Yàmù Yorùbá (Maanifesítò VIII) Originally commissioned and produced by the Prince Claus Fund for its 25th Anniversary Festival: 25 Years 25 Hours.
- 2020 Nobody Is Born Wise, durational performance (14 Hours) at India Art Fair, NSIC Exhibition Grounds, Okhla Industrial Estate, New Delhi, India (Friday 31 January – Sunday February 2).
- 2020 The Night Has Ears, performance with 64 persons at Martin-Gropius-Bau, Berlin, Germany (Saturday January 18).
- 2019 Enítere Èjitere (Iponri I), Performance at Paris Square, Haifa, Israel (Sunday, December 29, 2019).
- 2019 E Don Tey Wey We Dey, Performance at 21st Lagos Book and Arts Festival, Freedom Park, Broad Street, Ganiyu Smith Road and Campbell Street, Lagos, Nigeria (Saturday November 9, 2019).
- 2019 Enítere Èjitere (Iponri I), Performance at Institute for African and Diaspora Studies, University of Lagos, Nigeria (Wednesday November 6, 2019).
- 2019 Ọlọ́mọyọyọ, performance with Aweni Kudirat Apata, Barbara M. Messner, Gabriella Furno, Omolabake Saula, Simona Carniato and Susanna Pruna at SPIELART Festival, Staatliches Museum Ägyptischer Kunst, München, Germany (Saturday November 2).
- 2019 Olúwowojìwo, performance at the Private view of Lagos Photo Festival, African Artists' Foundation, Victoria Island, Lagos, Nigeria (Saturday October 26, 2019).
- 2019 E Don Tey Wey We Dey, BOZAR, Palais des Beaux-Arts / Centre for Fine Arts; and A Performance Affair (APA), Vanderborght Building, Brussels, Belgium (Friday September 6).
- 2019 My Eyes Are Larger Than My Mouth, performance as part of Arts & Globalization Platform's program 2019 tagged 'Politics of Space' at Giudecca, Venice, Italy (Saturday May 11).
- 2018 Ajagajigi, Give An Eye For Hurricane Michael (Alaragbo XVI), performance with Craig Bratten, Max Carter, Elanor Jones, Annelise Rennhack, Chelsea Serzen, Jackson Williams, Trinity Kai, Eden Leal, Courtney McClain, Deena Owens, Cory Perry at Atrium, 1 E Center St and Fayetteville Square (East St. between Central St. and Mountain St.), Arkansas, Fayetteville, AR, US, (Wednesday November 14).
- 2018 Red Flag (In The Red Series #10), performance with Mohammed Lawal, Toby Omomia, Moshood Lawal, Maryam Lawal, Karen Allen Baxter, Kathleen Moyer, Sylvia Ann Soares, Susanna Pruna, Shreeyash Gotmare, Lisa Biggs, Angella Nash Wade, Khalif Andre and Jacob Stanton at George H. Bass Performing Arts Space, Churchill House, and Green Area, Brown University, Providence Rhode Island, US (Saturday October 20).
- 2016 Senate, Are You a Rotten Head? (Maanifesito IV) enacted on Thursday, November 3, 2016, at the Arthouse Foundation's headquarters on Norman Williams Street, Ikoyi

== Notable awards/grants ==
- 2018 Artist Protection Fund Award, Institute of International Education, New York, US.
- 2016 The Ota Club Quintessential Gold Award, Ogun State, Nigeria.
- 2016 Lagos Watch Media Consult - Ambassador of Peace and Security Award,
- Lagos, Nigeria.
- 2015 Distinguished Master Artist Award, Society of Nigerian Artists (Lagos Chapter),
- Lagos, Nigeria.
- 2015 Prince Claus Award, Amsterdam, the Netherlands.
- 2015 African Artists' Foundation Award, Lagos, Nigeria.
- 2015 Abiodun Adebayo Welfare Foundation Award of Excellence (for Youth Development), Lagos, Nigeria.
- 2012 Art Moves Africa (AMA) Mobility Grant to Harare, Zimbabwe.
- 2012 Prince Claus Fund Flight Grant to Berlin, Germany.
- 1998 National Youth Service Corps State Chairmanship Award, Akwa Ibom State, Nigeria.
- 1998 FGC Award – for Best Serving Corps Member, Federal Government College, Ikot Ekpene, Akwa Ibom State, Nigeria.
- 1998 Cyprian Ihejiahi Award – for Best Final Year Student in Sculpture, Ahmadu Bello University, Zaria, Kaduna State, Nigeria.
