= Edgar Langeveldt =

Zimbabwean comedian, singer-songwriter and actor

- Born: 1969 (age 56–57)
- Occupations: comedian, singer-songwriter and actor

Edgar Langeveldt is a Zimbabwean comedian, singer-songwriter and actor.

== Background ==
Langeveldt was born in 1969. He studied law and political science.

In Zimbabwe he is above all known for his performances as a stand-up comedian. Since 2001, Langeveldt works and travels greatly outside Zimbabwe, because of the political situation under the regime of President Mugabe. As a result he is yet widely known in South Africa as well.

In his performances his satire deals with subjects as contrarieties, social abuses and social injustices. He pokes fun at his own as well as other communities. In this profession he writes his own texts. In 2001 he played a minor role in the action film High Explosive. Furthermore, he is a singer as well.

In 2005, he was honored with a Prince Claus Award from the Netherlands within the theme humor and satire, for his role as a stand-up comedian.

As a singer he won the Carnivore Lyrics Contest in 2011. He shared this award with writer Penny Lendrum.
