= Bruno Stagno =

Bruno Stagno Hon. FAIA (Santiago de Chile, 1943) is a Costa Rican architect.

Stagno combines concepts from the contemporary international architecture with concepts from the tropical architecture. With it he developed an own syncretic style which he practices in the Institute for Tropical Architecture in San José, which he founded himself. For his innovating work he was awarded a Prince Claus Award in 1997 and was made an Honorary Fellow of the American Institute of Architects.
