= Rosina Cazali =

Guatemalan art critic

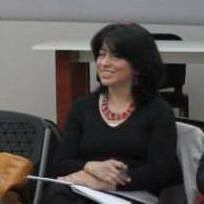
Photo of Rosina Cazali at the Absurdo simposium in Quetzaltenango, Guatemala in 2013.

Rosina Cazali (born in 1960) is a Guatemalan art critic and independent curator. She serves as an advisory committee member for CIFO (The Cisneros Fontanals Art Foundation). Cazali works as a columnist for El Periódico, a Guatemalan newspaper. She co-curated the 2014 Guatemalan Biennial, XIX Bienal de Arte Paiz, along with Cecilia Fajardo-Hill, Anabella Acevedo and Pablo José Ramírez.

== Life and career ==
She studied arts at Universidad de San Carlos de Guatemala and attended the first Cultural Studies lectures organized by FLACSO (Latin American Faculty of Social Sciences, 2011)

She works as an independent curator since 2000 and founded several art projects such as La Curandería and Los Tres Tiempos, art essays editorial (2014)

From 2003 to 2006, Cazali was director of the Spanish Cultural Center in Guatemala where she started projects like the photography festival Foto 30 and the editorial project Colección Pensamiento, a compilation of interviews with Guatemalan intellectuals on contemporary thought, supported by the Spanish Cultural Centre in Guatemala.

Among her notable projects are La Curandería, Colloquia, Octubreazul and Proyecto Laica. She was a member of the first curatorial team of the Bienal de Arte Paiz, which in 2014 has had 19 editions, but prior to 2008 was not a curated event.

Between 2003 and 2005, she curated several exhibitions on contemporary art in Guatemala and Central América. One of them was Outsiders, an important look over indigenous contemporary art in Guatemala.

In 2007, she was invited by Fundación TEOR/éTica of Costa Rica to participate in Estrecho Dudoso (Doubtful Strait), a large-scale visual arts event celebrated at several institutional venues and public spaces of San José, Costa Rica. For this event, she curated a monographic exhibition of Margarita Azurdia, a fundamental Guatemalan artist from the 1960s.

She also participated as a guest curator for Guatemala in different international biennials and as an independent curator for several exhibitions in Guatemala and Latin America. Some of these include Móvil, an exhibition and performance by Guatemalan artist Regina José Galindo at the Museo de Arte Contemporáneo (MUAC) and UNAM’s independence bi-centenary celebration project: The Ghost of Liberty, México 2010.

She curated Mirando al Sur, an itinerant show about migration in Central America and México exhibited in Miami, México, the Dominican Republic, Central America and the Pontevedra Biennale in Galicia, Spain, in 2010.

With Laura Terré, she co-curated the exhibition Peso y Levedad, Photography in Contemporary Latin America, for the Instituto Cervantes de Madrid, within the activities of PHOTO España, 2011.

In the same year, she curated with Emiliano Valdés the exhibition El proyecto inconcluso, a panoramic exhibition on contemporary painting in Central America.

She has participated in theoretical events such as: Temas Centrales, organized by Teorética in San José, Costa Rica in 2000 and 2012; Curatorial Practice and Criticism in Latin America, by Bard College’s Center for Curatorial Studies, New York, March 2011; IV Diálogos Iberoamericanos/POST Issues, Valencia, Spain 2001; No title, International Symposium on Latin American Art in Global Context, the University of Austin, Texas, March 2006; ARCO’s debate forums, Madrid, Spain 2006; Contemporary Art in Guatemala. A Comparative Lecture, New Mexico University, Alburquerque, September 2008; Contemporary Art in Guatemala, 3 type events at the seminar Tras Signos en Rotación, organized by the project Ojo Atómica and Anti-Museo, Spanish Cultural Center in México, 2009;La vida nuda, preliminary encounter at Kasell Documenta in México City and Cairo; Between the museum and practice: Reconsidering Latin American Art in the XXI Century, Museum of Latin American Art, MOLAA, Long Beach, California, in collaboration with the Getty Research Institute, Lima, Perú 2011; Foro Latinoamericano de Fotografía de São Paulo, Brasil, 2013; Daegu Photography Biennial and Symposium, Seul, Korea. 2014.

She participated as a photography reviewer for Photo-España’s portfolio review events in Madrid, São Paulo, Managua and Cartagena/Colombia.

In recognition of her work, she was invited to participate in the project 9 Curators, organized by Gerardo Mosquera and the Spanish Cultural Centers in Argentina and Chile.

Cazali is the author of countless essays about contemporary art in Guatemala. In 2010, she published the essay A Brief History of Dissociation, about the work of the Guatemalan artist Luis González Palma. This essay was included in the Latin American Photographers’ Library, part of the Photo Bolsillo collection of the editorial house La Fábrica, Spain.

She was invited as a speaker to discuss performance art and video art in Guatemala at the event Performing Localities, organized by the Royal College of Art, London, 2009.

She was part of the Orientation Trip 2010, which took place in Istanbul, Lagos, and Bamako and was realized by the Mondrian Foundation and the Prince Claus Foundation. In 2011 she was invited to teach a workshop entitled Inmonumental, a review, and deconstruction of the symbols and discourses of the monuments as part of the contemporary art project Demolition/Construction, in Córdoba, Argentina. In March 2012, she was invited by ICI, Independent Curators International, to be part of the Curator’s Perspective, an itinerant public discussion series that features international curators who distill current happenings in contemporary art, and their views on recent developments in the art world; the New Museum of Art, New York. In 2010, she received the John Simon Guggehnheim Grant to conduct research on contemporary art in Guatemala. She works and resides in Guatemala City, Guatemala. In 2014 she received from Fundación ArsTeorética, San José Costa Rica, a grant for research on Grupo Imaginaria, a collective of artists from the 1980s in Guatemala.

Between December 2008 and March 2010, the Migraciones: Mirando al Sur exhibit traveled through Guatemala, Honduras, El Salvador, Nicaragua, Mexico, United States of America, and Costa Rica—showing at the Spanish Cultural Centers of each country. This group exhibit included 12 Central American contemporary artists, including Adán Vallencillo, Lucía Madriz, and Patricia Belli.

In 2014, she coordinated El día que nos hicimos contemporáneos, a theoretical symposium with emphasis in Central American thought and discussions centered in a reflection about contemporary art in the isthmus and its development. The symposium also was the frame for the exhibition with the same name, in celebration of the XX Anniversary of the Museo de Arte y Diseño Contemporáneo, in San José, Costa Rica.

== Awards and recognition ==
In 2010, Cazali was granted a Guggenheim Fellowship in Fine Arts Research in order to develop research on Guatemalan art production between 2000 and 2010.

In 2014, Cazali was honored with the Prince Claus Awards.

== Exhibitions ==
- Móvil, an exhibition and performance by Regina José Galindo, Museo de Arte Contemporáneo (2011)
- Migraciones: Mirando al Sur Arte, organized by the Spanish Cultural Center Network of AECID and curated by Cazali (2009)
- Imaginaria, Disidente, Centro Cultural de España en Guatemala (2015)

== Bibliography ==
- Cazali, Rosina. Pasos a Desnivel: mapa urbano de la cultura contemporanea en Guatemala. HIVOS & laCuranderia. Guatemala City, 2003. Print.
- Cazali, Rosina. Luis González Palma: PHoto Bolsillo. La Fábrica, 2011. Print.
- Cazali, Rosina. Estados de Excepción, 2014. Print.
- Cazali, Rosina, and Fernando Castro Florez. Regina José Galindo. Milan: Silvana Editoriale, 2011. Print.
