= Elena Rivera Mirano =

American singer (born 1951)

Elena Rivera Mirano (born 1951) is a Filipino academic in art studies, a music scholar, choir conductor and singer in the Philippines.

Rivera Mirano grew up on the University of the Philippines campus in Diliman, Quezon City. She obtained her Bachelor of Arts in English, cum laude. Subsequently, she obtained her first Master of Arts in Comparative Literature, and then her Ph.D. in Philippine Studies, all three at the University of the Philippines. She obtained a second Master's degree at Stanford University in the field of Humanities.

She is professor emeritus in Art Studies at the College of Arts and Letters at the University of the Philippines. Here she did an extensive research on the traditional culture of southern Tagalog and the musical heritage of the Philippines.

In 1986 she mounted a one-woman show of her music album Kumintang: Awitin ng mga Tagalog na taga Batangas, which she had recorded through a U.P. Centennial Grant. This was toured by the Cultural Center of the Philippines.

She is the choir director of Cherubim and Seraphim, the official children's choir of the University. With the choir she has produced the theater piece Awit ni Pulau.

In 1998, she served as the Research Director for the Philippine Program at the Smithsonian Folklife Festival. She also served as Research Consultant for the Museo ng Batangas.

Rivera's book Subli: One Dance in Four Voices was awarded a National Book Award in 1989 under the category art book. In 1998 her book Ang Mga Tradisyonal na Musikang Pantinig sa Lumang Bauan, Batangas was proclaimed best book at the U.P. Diliman Gawad Chancellor Awards. She was principal author and editor-in-chief of “The Life and Works of Marcelo Adonay,” vol 1, which won the National Book Award, art book category, in 2009.

In 2001 Rivera was honored with a Prince Claus Award from the Netherlands. The jury described her as a contemporary renaissance musician. In 2007 she received the Achievement Award in Humanities of the National Research Council of the Philippines.

She served as Dean of the College of Arts and Letters of the University of the Philippines, Diliman, from 2009-2015.

== Bibliography ==
- 1989: Subli. One Dance in Four Voices (Subli: Isang Sayaw sa Apat na Tinig), with Neal M. Oshima, Basilio Esteban Villaruz, Marian Pastor-Roces & Glenna Aquino, Museo ng Kalinangang Pilipino, Cultural Resources and Communication Services, Cultural Center of the Philippines: National Coordinating Center for the Arts, ISBN 978-9718546031
- 1992: Musika: An Essay on Spanish influence on Philippine music, Tuklas Sining, Sentrong Pangkultura ng Pilipinas (Cultural Center of the Philippines)
- 1997: Ang mga tradisyonal na musikang pantinig sa lumang Bauan, Batangas(Traditional Song in Old Bauan Batangas) National Commission on Culture and the Arts, ISBN 978-9719150039
- 2010: The Life and Works of Marcelo Adonay, Volume I, with Corazon Canave Dioquino, Melissa Corazon Velez Mantaring, Patricia Brillantes-Silvestre & Inigo Galing Vito, University of The Philippines Press, ISBN 978-9715425728
- 2011: Philippine Humanities Review: Special Issue on CAL Research Agenda, with Jovy M. Peregrino, Wystan de la Pena, Patricia May B. Jurilla, Patricia Marion Lopez, Antoinette Bass-Hernandez, Felipe M. de Leon Jr. and Gonzalo Campoamor II (ed.), Amazon Digital Services, ASIN B0060XK1PU
