= Dessalegn Rahmato =

Ethiopian sociologist

- Born: 1940 (age 85–86); Adama
- Citizenship: Ethiopia
- Occupation: sociologist
- Notable work: Agrarian Reform in Ethiopia
- Awards: Prince Claus Award Fellow of the Ethiopian Academy of Sciences

Dessalegn Rahmato (Amharic: ደሳለኝ ራህማቶ) is an Ethiopian sociologist. He was born in 1940 in Adama and he studied in the United States. He is specialized in agricultural development, famine and resettlement.

In 1970, Rahmato published his first important article on the necessity of lasting and dedicated research within the field of agricultural studies, The Conditions of the Ethiopian Peasantry. He wrote the article in Challenge that is published by Ethiopian Students Union in North America (ESUNA).

After the Ethiopian Civil War of 1974 and the formation of the communist Derg regime, Rahmato returned to Ethiopia. As distinct from other intellectuals in that time, he did not interfere in organized left politics. Rahmato choose for a career at the Addis Ababa University.

Until 1997, Rahmato worked incessantly at research for the Institute of Development Research which is allied to the university. In 1984, at the time of the famine in Ethiopia (1983-1985), he published his most noted work: Agrarian Reform in Ethiopia. In this publication he mapped the consequences of the radical land reforms that were introduced in 1975.

In 1997 he founded the Forum for Social Studies (FSS). It was the first independent research center on national politics in Ethiopia. In the first year, he organized three workshops for scientists, policy makers and government officials, in order to evaluate and formulate new policies on agriculture, the admission to information, and education. For his presentations in the field of research that incited development of agriculture in Ethiopia, he was honored with a Prince Claus Award from the Netherlands in 1999.

At the beginning of the second decade of the 21st Century, Rahmato works on research on the food security in Ethiopia, after many agricultural sites had been bought by speculators from other countries like Saudi Arabia.

== Bibliography ==
- 1984: Agrarian Reform in Ethiopia, Nordiska Afrikainstitutet, Sweden, ISBN 978-9171062260
- 1991: Faminie and Survival Strategies: A Case Study of Northeast Ethiopia, Nordiska Afrikainstitutet, Sweden, ISBN 978-9171063144
- 1992: The Dynamics of Rural Poverty: Case Studies from a District in Southern Ethiopia, CODESRIA, ASIN: B007FRT1YM
- 1994: Land Tenure and Land Policy in Ethiopia after the Derg: Proceedings of the Second Workshop of the Land Tenure Project, University of Trondheim, Centre for Environment and Development, Norway, ISBN 978-8290817089
- 2000: Democratic Assistance to Post-conflict Ethiopia: Impact and Limitations, with Meheret Ayenew, African Books Collective Limited, ISBN 978-1904855651
- 2000: Some Aspects of Poverty in Ethiopia: Three Selected Papers, African Books Collective Ltd., ISBN 978-1904855699
- 2001: Environmental Change and State Policy in Ethiopia, Forum for Social Studies, ASIN: B007EU388A
- 2004: Searching for Tenure Security: The Land System and New Policy Initiatives in Ethiopia, Forum for Social Studies, ASIN: B0041NE1I4
- 2008: The Peasant and the State: Studies in Agrarian Change in Ethiopia 1950s - 2000s, CreateSpace, ISBN 978-1438266534
- 2011: Land to Investors: Large-Scale Land Transfers in Ethiopia, Forum for Social Studies
