= Nader Fergany =

Egyptian sociologist and economist (1944–2024)

Nader Abd-Elmaksoud Fergany (Egyptian Arabic: نادر فرجانى; 20 August 1944 – 31 December 2024) was an Egyptian sociologist and economist. He was director of the Egyptian research center Al-Mishkat.

== Life and career ==
Fergany was born in Giza on 20 August 1944. He obtained his bachelor's degree in 1963 at the Faculty of Economics and Political Science of Cairo University. He continued his studies at the University of North Carolina and received his Ph.D. there in 1970.

Fergany has published works related to the fields of demography, migration, labor market, education and development, in Egypt and other Arab countries.

He effectuated research for a great number of Egyptian and international institutes. He was an advisor for many Arab and international organizations, like the National Planning Institute, the National Population Council, the Central Agency for Mobilization and Statistics and the American University, all in Cairo. Furthermore, he did research for the Arab Institute for Training and Research in Statistics in Baghdad, the Arab Planning Institute in Kuwait and St Antony's College in Oxford in the United Kingdom.

== Death ==
Fergany died on 31 December 2024, at the age of 80.

== Bibliography ==
Fergany was the principal author of the Arab Human Development Report of 2002. This report was honored in 2003 with a Prince Claus Award from the Netherlands and was the first of a series of reports in this field that followed in subsequent years. These reports were labored by a great number of scientists. Furthermore, he published (selection):

- 1974: An introduction to demographic analysis
- 1975: The relationship between fertility level and societal development: And implications for planning to reduce fertility: an exercise in macro-statistical modelling
- 1981: The role of Egyptian labour in the construction sector in Kuwait
- 1987: Differentials in labour migration, Egypt (1974-1984)
- 1981: Monitoring the condition of the poor in the third world: Some aspects of measurement
- 2001: Human development and the acquisition of advanced knowledge in Arab countries : the role of higher education, research and technological development
