= Van Leo =

Armenian-Egyptian photographer

Van Leo (born Levon Alexander Boyadjian; November 20, 1921 – March 18, 2002) was an Armenian-Egyptian photographer who became known for his numerous self-portraits and portraits of celebrities of his time.

== Biography and career ==
Born in November 1921 in the Ottoman Empire, Van Leo grew up during an era of Armenian genocide and persecution and had to flee with his family at the age of 4 to take refuge in Egypt. It was only due to his father's privileged social position as a worker for a German-owned Baghdad railway Company that Levon and his family escaped the genocide in the Ottoman Empire. In Egypt, Levon attended the English Mission School followed by the English Mission College. It was at the English Mission College, around the age of 16 or 17, after having bought Hollywood postcards of famous film star that Levon discovered his interest in photography. Fascinated by Hollywood and the world of cinema, Levon decided to put his studies on hold, after having been enrolled in the American University in Cairo in 1940 to pursue his passion. Levon undertook an apprenticeship at Studio Venus owned by a famous Armenian photographer named Artinian before opening his own studio with his brother Angelo in January, 1941, in the living room of their apartment. Most of the brothers' clientele were transitory WWII soldiers and officers, and entertainers and high society of the Opera who were often brought via the Entertainment National Service Association to entertain the soldiers and officers of the British troops. In 1947, the partnership ended between the 2 brothers and Levon established his own studio, for which and from which he later go the name Van Leo. Although throughout the 6 years of partnership between the 2 brothers all the prints bore Angelo's name, it was generally agreed that Van Leo was the more talented but the differences between the 2 in the early years of the partnership still remain blurred.

During the early years of his studio, Van Leo would often take portraits of people, some of which were celebrities, for free, for the sake of advertisement of his new studio. Actors, actresses, entertainers from the Opera were his favorite clientele for they were in constant need of new pictures for their productions. One condition maintained for Van Leo's free work was that a visible credit would be shown under each photograph and as such his name became associated with the celebrities. Although he was associated with the celebrities, Van Leo was admired for being a photographer who did not seek money, or publicity. He had refused to attain a name from being a photographer of the powerful, like several photographers at the time who had publicized themselves as being photographers of kings or presidents. After the Egyptian coup d'état of 1952, Van Leo's clients mainly became individuals from the higher strata of the Egyptian society, and popular faces like writers, scholars, also actors and actresses maintained their dealings with the photographer (Rushdi Abaza, Dalida, Taha Hussien, Omar El Sherif). Out of necessity, he also had to start doing passport and ID work, wedding portraits, portraits for soldiers and officers of the Egyptian Armed Forces, and even reproductions of photos the deceased brought by their loved ones. On January 24, 1998 Van Leo did his last portrait session and later proceeded to close his studio. The same year, Van Leo bequeathed his entire collection of work to the American University of Cairo. In March 2002, Van Leo died from a heart attack.

== Work ==
Van Leo was characterized by a glamorous style inspired by Hollywood; his lights were always theatrical and his images always refined with his printing techniques. Printing methods were central for Van Leo's work. Increasingly he would use 35mm film for subjects of little interest for him. He would reserve the largest sheet films (18x24 cm) for his favored subjects. One important subject was himself. Van Leo invested in his own self-portraits which he called "auto-portraits" and has created for himself a collection of 400 auto-portraits in various costumes and characters including Jesus, a beggar, a WWII pilot, a cowboy, a robber, a woman hater, several varieties of women, a gunman, a Saudi Sheikh, and many others. Besides portraits, Leon also invested in photographing antiquities like the Pyramids of Giza, famous mosques in Cairo, ruins in Luxor, and touristic sites in Paris, Rome, and Vienna. Van Leo was also known for his attention to details. Not only did he control the set, the surroundings, and the lighting, but he also mastered the angles of his shots, the poses, the expressions, and was known for being self-sufficient and independent in his work, and in that way was compared to a painter. This is portrayed in Van Leo's mastery to create a portrait of an Egyptian athlete posing as Rodin's "thinker". A subject giving him no restrictions over a portrait, and complete freedom as to how arrange the details was the ultimate compliment to Van Leo. It has been argued that the strength of Van Leo's portraits comes from his understanding of the character of his sitters. When he asked what attracted him to portraits in specific, he answered that it has been a person's face that appealed to and interested him the most.

Van Leo was known for his black and white portraits and the end of the black and white era and the emergence of color caused a significant shift in Van Leo's life and career. To Van Leo, artistic photography ended in Egypt with the changeover. Despite many photographers embracing the change, Leo's bias towards black and white clearly led to a noticeable decline in the output and quality of his work. Not only did his bias stand in his way, but the loss of control associated with the emergence of color, and his lack of strobes led to the ultimate decline in his work. Because of the changeover, Van Leo had to trade his familiar hand-produced prints from his darkroom to an operator in a commercial color lab. Secondly, he did not own or invest in modern strobes to improve output or lighting of his work, but rather clung to his old tungsten light equipment.

== Legacy and recognition ==
It has been argued that Van Leo's collection is a documentation of Egyptian society over the last fifty years and has been called an artist for turning his photography into art. Various articles written by friends and colleagues of Van Leo have been written about his life and work with each paying homage to his art and the manner in which the artist had insisted on preserving that art. After being nominated for the Prince Claus Award by the Arab Image Foundation in Beirut, an organization dedicated to preservation of old photographs of the Middle East, Van Leo won the award in 2000, and thereafter received heightened global attention and recognition. In 2001, Akram Zaatari, a Lebanese artist directed Her + Him Van Leo a documentary featuring Van Leo himself. Zaatari decided to use interview footage with Leo to produce a "kind of dialogue with Van-Leo as opposed to a film about him." Zaatari depicts an encounter between Van Leo and an anonymous researcher whose grandmother's picture was taken by Leo in 1959. The documentary discusses the life, work, and art of Van Leo. Van Leo is the subject of a book edited by Negar Azimi and Karl Bassil of the Arab Image Foundation, published by Archive Books. In 2018, the Institute for Comparative Modernities at Cornell University hosted an exhibition featuring his self portraits entitled Van-Leo: The Reluctant Surrealist which was accompanied by the catalog published by the same title. Most recently, Van Leo was the subject of a major retrospective at the Hammer Museum in Los Angeles, organized by Negar Azimi.

== Collection and archives ==
Van Leo's photographs and lifetime collection was bequeathed to the American University in Cairo in 1998. The Rare Books and Special Collections Library is currently digitizing his photographs. A subset of images exists at the Beirut-based Arab Image Foundation.

== Awards ==
Van Leo was honoured with a Prince Claus Award in 2000. He was the first photographer ever to win the prestigious prize.
