= Abdul Sheriff =

Tanzanian academic and museum director

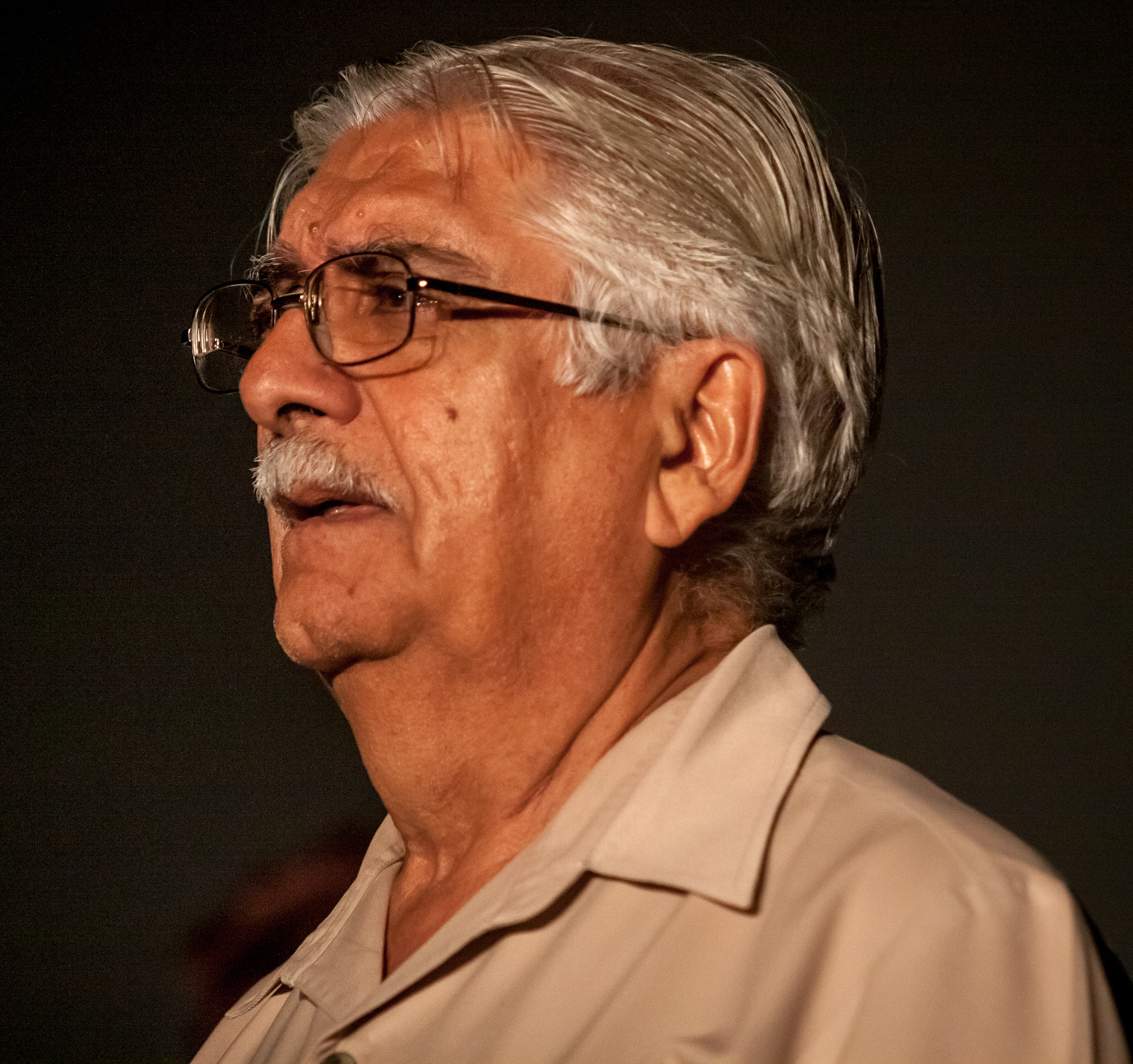
Abdul Sheriff

Abdul Sheriff (born 7 December 1939) is a Tanzanian emeritus professor of History at the University of Dar es Salaam, member of the Zanzibar Stone Town Advisory Board and former director of the Peace Memorial Museum (Beit al-Amani), one of the history museums of Zanzibar.

== Life ==
Sheriff was born on December 7, 1939, on the island of Zanzibar. He was able to study with scholarships of the African Scholarship Program of American Universities and the African-American Institute. He earned his Bachelor's degree in Geography in 1964 as well as his Master's degree in History in 1966 at the University of California, Los Angeles. At the School of Oriental and African Studies in London, he obtained his Ph.D. in 1971 on the basis of his research on the history of Africa.

Since 1969 he taught at the university of Dar es Salaam. From 1977 to 1979 he led the Faculty of History as associate professor, and chaired the historical society of Tanzania. In 1980, he was appointed as full professor at the university, where he taught until 1996. Furthermore, he was visiting professor at universities in Berlin, Lisbon, Bergen, Montreal and Minnesota.

Sheriff's main fields of investigation have been research on the Dhow culture of the Indian Ocean, the history and culture of Zanzibar, and the history and conservation of Stone Town, the old city district of Zanzibar. He has published numerous books and scientific articles on his fields of investigation, notably on the economic and social history of the Swahili coast and neighbouring regions of East Africa.

As museum director and member of the Zanzibar Stone Town Advisory Board, he has applied his knowledge in the restoration of the ceremonial palace of the sultan. In order to effectuate this restoration, he specially trained a local scientific team. Furthermore, he founded the House of Wonders as a national historical and cultural museum of Zanzibar and the Swahili coast.

In 2005, Sheriff was honored with the Prince Claus Award from the Netherlands for the crucial role he played in the conservation of the cultural heritage of Zanzibar. The following year he was rewarded with a Zeze Award of the Tanzanian Fund for Culture, and in 2007 with the Maxwell Cummings Distinguished Lectureship of McGill University.

== Bibliography ==
- 1987: Slaves, Spices & Ivory Zanzibar: Integration Of An East African Commercial, Ohio University Press, ISBN 978-0821408728
- 1991: Zanzibar Under Colonial Rule: Eastern African Studies, with Ed Ferguson, Ohio University Press, ISBN 978-0821409954
- 1995: Historical Zanzibar, with Javed Jafferji & Ashter Chomoko, Hsp Publications, ISBN 978-0952172628
- 1995: Zanzibar Chroniques Du Passe, HSP Publications, ISBN 978-0952172635
- 1995: Historical Zanzibar: Romance of the Ages, HSP Publications, ISBN 978-0952172673
- 1995: History & Conservation Of Zanzibar Stone Town, Ohio University Press, ISBN 978-0821411193
- 1998: Zanzibar stone town: an architectural exploration, with Zarina Jafferji, Gallery Publications, ASIN B007ERZZVG
- 2001: Zanzibar Stone Town, with Zarina Jafferji, Galley Publications, ISBN 978-9987887729
- 2006: The Zanzibar House of Wonders Museum: Self-reliance and Partnership, A Case Study in Culture and Development, with Paul Klooft & Mubiana Luhila, KIT Publishers Amsterdam, ISBN 978-9068324334
- 2010: Dhow Cultures and the Indian Ocean: Cosmopolitanism, Commerce, and Islam, KIT Publishers Amsterdam, ISBN 978-9068324334
