= Jean-Baptiste Kiéthéga =

Jean-Baptiste Kiéthéga is an archeologist and historian from Upper Volta, currently Burkina Faso. Kiéthéga was born on May 10, 1947, in Yako.

He is considered to be one of the first archeologists of West Africa. In course of his career, he was honored with a Prince Claus Award yet in 1998 for his progressions in archeology. At that time he had trained around 40 young scholars in this field, and has taken care that his research was made public in the academic world, as well as to the public via for instance museums.

According to Kiéthéga archaeological research in a developing country like Burkina Faso should not be seen as luxury. He views culture as a dynamic concept.

Since 2005 he is a professor at the University of Ouagadougou.

== Bibliography ==
- 1980: L'exploitation traditionelle de l'or sur la rive gauche de la Volta noire : (region de poura - Haute-Volta), with Jean Devisse
- 1983: L'or de la Volta noire: archéologie et histoire de l'exploitation traditionnelle, région de Poura, Haute-Volta, ISBN 978-2865370887, later reprinted
- 1989: La Recherche archeologique au Burkina Faso
- 1993: Découverte du Burkina Faso (Annales des conférences organisées par le Centre culturel français Georges Méliès de Ouagadougou, 1991-1992), ISBN 978-2907888226
- 1993: État des recherches sur la production traditionnelle du fer au Burkina Faso
- 2008: La métallurgie lourde du fer au Burkina Faso: une technologie a l' epoque pre-coloniale. Karthala, Paris, ISBN 978-2845866904
