= Institute for Islamic and Social Studies =

- Lembaga Kajian Islam dan Sosial
- Formation: September 3, 1993; 33 years ago
- Type: NGO
- Location: Bantul, Indonesia
- Website: lkis.or.id

The Institute for Islamic and Social Studies (Indonesian: Lembaga Kajian Islam dan Sosial, LKiS), is an Indonesian non-governmental organization that was founded on September 3, 1993, in Yogyakarta. The institute stimulates intellectual debate on a grassroots level.

LKiS is a progressive publisher of islamic books and also a promoter of several interests within the country, like democratization, pluralism and nonviolence. The foundation publishes the bulletin Ikhtilaf, effectuates reform projects in Probolinggo (East Java) en Tasikmalaya (West Java) and produces television and radio programs. Weekly it distributes about 20,000 pamphlets in mosques.

It works together with for instance Boston University and is sponsored by USAID, the Ford Foundation, the Asia Foundation and others. In 2002 the institute was honored with a Prince Claus Award from the Netherlands.
