= Farroukh Qasim =

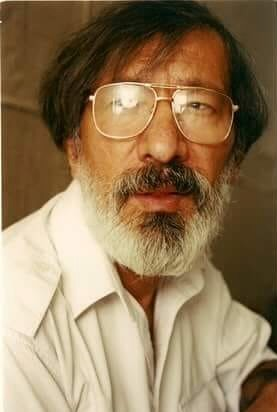
- Born: 17 September 1948
- Died: 7 February 2010 (aged 61); Dushanbe, Tajikistan
- Occupations: Theatre and cinema actor and director

Farroukh Qasim (Tajik: Фаррухи Қосим, Persian: فرخ قاسم, (17 September 1948 – 7 February 2010) is a Tajik actor and Persian theatre director from Tajikistan. In 2004, he was a laureate of the international Prince Claus Awards for having "brought renewal to theatre in Tajikistan through his approach to the creative reworking of an eclectic repertoire".

== Overview ==
Farroukh Qasim was born on 17 September 1948 in Dushanbe and died on 7 February 2010 in Dushanbe.

A renowned theatre director, he created performances based on sources as varied as Rumi, Zoroastrian and Koranic texts, Sufi mystics, and plays by Molière and Bulgakov. For instance, a Tajik version of King Lear incorporating 10th century Persian verses.

In 2004, he was a laureate of Netherlands's international Prince Claus Awards as "an outstanding actor" who "had brought renewal to theatre in Tajikistan through his approach to the creative reworking of an eclectic repertoire", honoring him "for his creative contributions to performance art and literature in Tajikistan".

== See also ==
- Cinema of Iran
- Persian theatre
