= Pegah Ahmadi =

Iranian poet

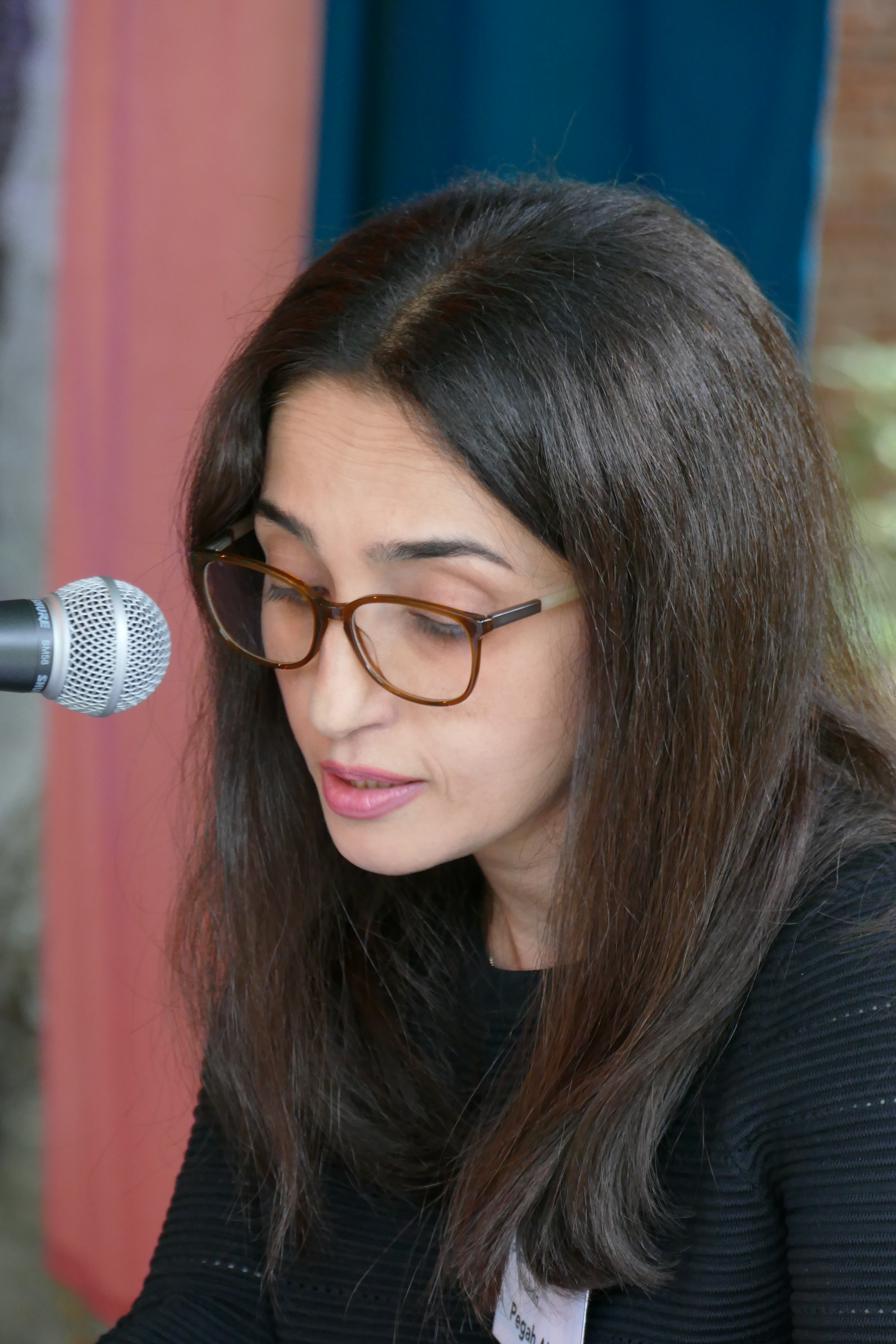
Pegah Ahmadi in Berlin, 2023

Pegāh Ahmadi (Persian: پگاه احمدی; born 1974) is an Iranian poet, scholar, literary critic, and translator of poetry.

== Biography ==
Pegah Ahmadi was born in Tehran in 1974. She began writing poetry at the age of seven. At seventeen, she made her debut as a poet by publishing a poem in the literary magazine Takāpu, edited by Mansur Kushān. Since then, she has regularly contributed to literary magazines inside Iran. She has studied Persian Literature at the University of Tehran.

Ahmadi has published four books of poetry, On the Final Sol G (1999), Cadence (2001), Writing Footnotes on the Wall of the Family Home (200?), and My These Days Is Throat (Note: The actual title of this book is In Ruzhā'yam Galust (این روزهایم گلوست). The accuracy of the translation My These Days Is Throat is to be ascertained.) (2004). She has further published two works of translation from English into Persian, one an anthology of the poems by Sylvia Plath, The Love Song of the Insane Girl (2000), and the other a translation of the book Haiku: Poetry Ancient and Modern, by Jackie Hardy, Hundred and One Haikus, From Past to Present (2007). Ahmadi's scholarly book Women's Poetry from the Beginning to the Present Day was published by Nashr-e Sāles (Sāles Publications) in 2005. The first volume of Ahmadi's second scholarly book A Comprehensive Anthology of the Poetry by Iranian Women, was to be published by Cheshmeh Publications.

Ahmadi has published over sixty articles on subject matters related to criticism of verse, theoretical issues about poetry and translation of poems in such monthly and quarterly arts and literary magazines as Dourān, Kārnāmeh, Kelk, Jahān-e Ketāb, Bokhārā, Bidār, Sabk-e Nou, Film, Zanān, Thursday Evening, Āzarang, Nāfeh, Shoukarān, Āzmā, Negāh-e Nou, Payām-e Shomāl and Pāprik.

She has also taught "Poetry in cinema" at the Tehran Film School and edited the Paperik literary review.

== Politics ==
After critiquing the Islamic religion and suppression of free expression in Iran, Ahmadi was dismissed from her job and banned from publishing. In 2009, after joining Green Movement demonstrations, she was threatened with imprisonment, and left Iran. She has since lived in Frankfurt, Rhode Island and Köln.

== Selected works ==
=== Collections of poetry ===
- Ruy-e Sol-e Pāyān-i (روی سُل ِ پایانی), On the Final Sol G, 1999
- Kādens (کادِنس), Cadence, 2001
- Tahshiyeh bar Divār-e Khānegi (تحشیه بر دیوار ِ خانگی), Writing Footnotes on the Wall of the Family Home, 200?
- In Ruzhā'yam Galust (این روزهایم گلوست), My These Days Is Throat, 2004
- Mir war nicht kalt (I was not cold) (Sujet Verlag 2011)
- Wucht (Force) (Sujet Verlag 2018)
- Sheddat (شدت ) (Intensity) January 2017
- Das war also die Zukunft: Gedichte (So that was the future: Poems) (April 2024)

=== Scholarly books ===
- She'r-e Zan az Āghāz tā Emruz (شعر ِ زن از آغاز تا امروز), Women's Poetry from the Beginning to the Present Day, 2005

=== Translations from English ===
- Āvāz Āsheghāneh-ye Dochtar-e Divāneh (آواز ِ عاشقانه ی دختر ِ دیوانه), The Love Song of the Insane Girl, 2000
- Sad o Yek Haiku, Az Gozashteh tā Emruz (صد و یك هایكو، از گذشته تا امروز), Hundred and One Haikus, From Past to Present, 2007. A translation of [possibly] the book Haiku: Poetry Ancient and Modern, by Jakie Hardy (Tuttle Publishing).

== See also ==
- International Cities of Refuge Network
- Arts of the Working Class website Transcript of Wo Sich die Beiden Namen Treffen (Where The Two Names Meet’’)

== Sources ==
- A curriculum vitae of Pegah Ahmadi on the official website of Khorshid: Iranian Women's Poetry Prize, in Persian, .
- A poem by Pegāh-e Ahmadi (She'e-ri az Pegāh-e Ahmadi), in Persian, Gābil.
- Pegah Ahmadi, Dichter (Poet), Poetry International Rotterdam, Stichting Poetry International (Poetry International Society), .
