= Liang Shaoji =

Chinese conceptual artist (1945–2026)

Liang Shaoji (Chinese: 梁绍基; 1945 – 13 September 2026) was a Chinese conceptual artist who exhibited internationally.

== Background ==
Liang, originally from Zhongshan, was born in Shanghai in 1945.

He studied at the China Academy of Art and obtained his degree from the academy in 1965. Later, he studied at the Varbanov Institute for Textile Art, which is part of the China Academy of Art. He completed his studies at the institute in 1986. In 1988, he started to cultivate silk worms, to meet his attraction to rough silk which he used amply in his art works.

Liang exhibited internationally. Among others, he presented his work at the biennales of Venice (1999), Istanbul (1999), Lyon (2000) and Shanghai (2000, 2006).

Liang died in Shanghai on 13 September 2026, at the age of 81.

== Work ==
Liang's most notable creations were within the Natural Series. His creations were characterized as "unique meditations over nature and the human existence".

One of these creations is a video recording (no. 25). In it he hurts his feet until they bleed, in order to suppress the pain of the silk works whilst weaving their web on metal scobs. The idea behind this work lies in the century-old Chinese philosophy that man and animal should live together as equals and in harmony. He admitted later though that the production of the video had been more painful than he had realized before.

Candles (no. 87) is another work from his Natural Series. Here he places pieces of bamboo on a row, filled them with wax, and weaved silk threads around them. This work is a presentation of funerals and Buddhist rituals and goes back to an old Chinese poem from the 9th century, in which a comparison is made between the last drop of wax of a candle and the last end of a thread of a silk worm.

Cloud (no. 101) shows a square mirror on a mountain that consists of a number of smaller square mirrors. It seems like clouds are reflected at a background of a blue sky. In reality, however, it is a combination of silk worms on mirror glass. The work is meant to be a musing of the concept of time.

Helmets (no. 102) is a memorial of the victims under miners. The work consists of miner helmets covered with a web of fine silk as an expression of the fear and pain that are suppressed in these helmets.

== Awards ==
Liang received a number of awards. In 2002, he was honored with a Chinese Contemporary Art Award.

In 2009, Liang was honored with a Prince Claus Award from the Netherlands. He received the award for his "evocative artworks that offer a meditative approach in which art becomes nature and nature becomes art, for his artistic integrity in working outside the mainstream, and for his insightful investigation of the ethics of the human condition and relationship with nature."
