= Talingo =

Talingo was an independent cultural magazine in Panama. It was published monthly.

== History and profile ==
Talingo was founded in 1993 and its first issue appeared on 30 May 1993. The magazine publishes in Spanish on art and culture in a broad context, including cultural criticism. The magazine is edited by La Prensa, one of the biggest newspapers of the country.

In 2001 the magazine was honored with a Prince Claus Award, a major cultural award from the Netherlands.
