= Habiba Djahnine =

Algerian film producer

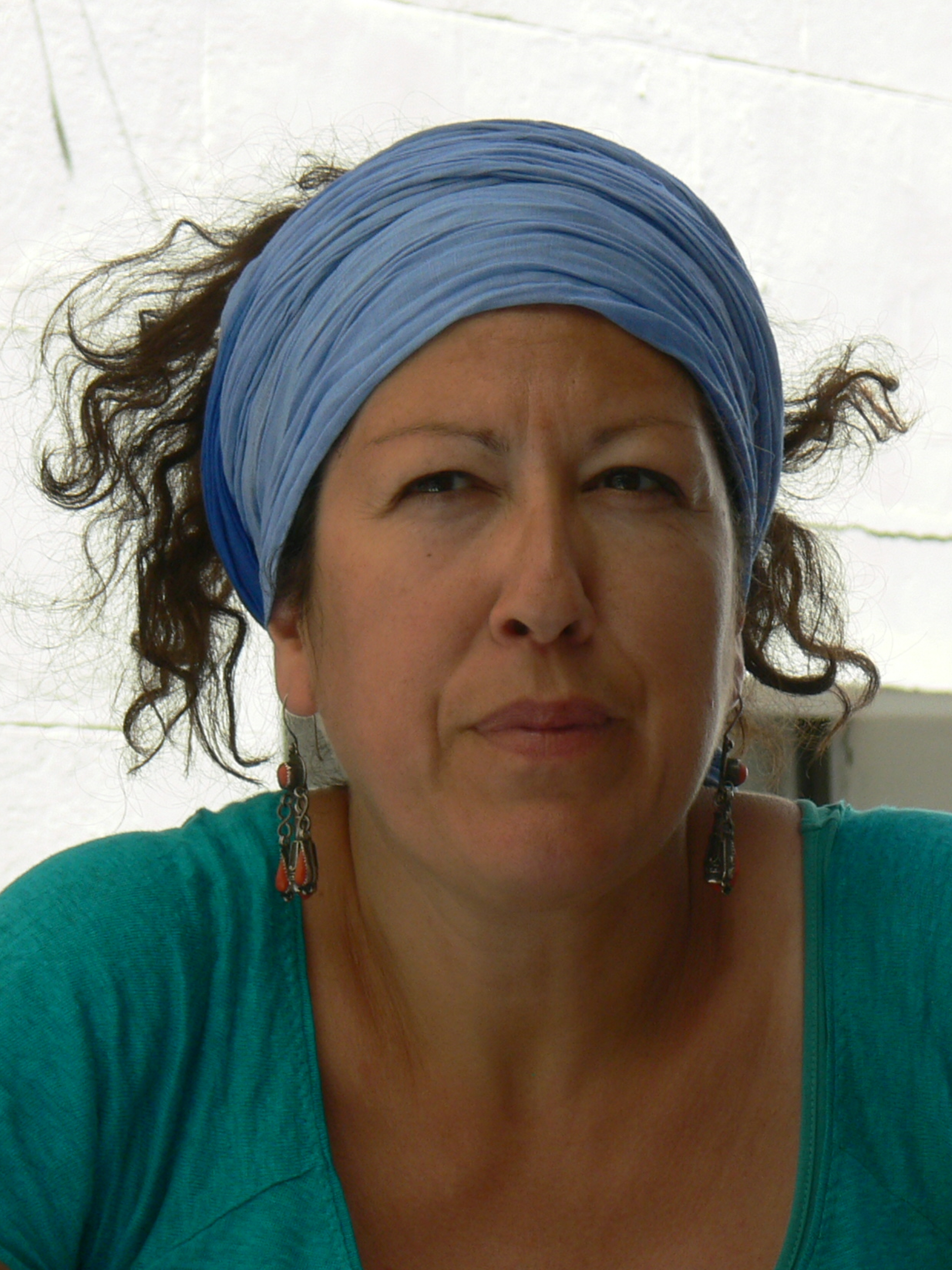
- Born: 1968 (age 57–58); Tizi Ouzou
- Known for: Documentary film
- Movement: Feminism
- Awards: Prince Claus Award (2012)

Habiba Djahnine is an Algerian film producer of particularly documentary films, curator of international film festivals, writer, essayist and feminist.

== Life ==
Djahnine was born in 1968 in Tizi Ouzou. In the nineties she was one of the prominent feminists in her country. Her sister was a feminist activist as well and until 1995 president of "Tiɣri n tameṭṭut" (Women in Protest, in Kabyle); she was killed by Muslim fundamentalists on February 15, 1995, during the Algerian Civil War (1991–2002).

The civil war divided the feminists into supporters of the Algerian army, and on the other hand those who opposed the cruelty of the central power. In the second decade of the 21st Century she replied on this era that she is not an activist anymore, however she still considers herself a feminist. Meanwhile, she holds a critical stand to the development of the feminist movement in former days, which she tries to catch in her films frequently.

After the civil war many feminists changed their focus to culture. As Djahnine did, who was co-founder of Association Kaïna Cinéma, and in 2007 of Cinéma et Mémoire Association. Next to that she published the volume of poetry Outre-Mort (Beyond Death), wrote humoristic articles for French, and Algerian magazines and wrote a number of short stories.

Since 2003 Djahnine is consultant and curator of several international film festivals, like Rencontres Cinématographiques de Béjaïa where fifty to sixty new films are presented annually. It hosts space for the film industry for debate, networking and the exchange of knowledge. Next to this festival, she organized other initiatives like Arab Shorts for the German Goethe-Institut.

In 2006 Djahnine returned to Algeria, where she looked back to the death of her sister and the political situation of that moment. One question that was occupying her was "Why was dialogue impossible?" This question was an important theme in her documentary Lettre à ma soeur (Letter to my sister) that she issued one year later and, like her other productions, was issued outside of Algeria as well. In Lettre à ma soeur she tries to refute violence to be a solution to social disputes. Her documentaries reveal factual facets of Algeria, its history and the consequences of it on its society.

With her own atelier, Béjaïa Doc, she offers film education to young Algerians with attention to all facets of the profession, like film history, production, distribution and film scripting. All students must complete a film on the life in their own community.

In 2012 she was honored with a Prince Claus Award for her part in reviving Algerian cinema and for "creating sensitive, challenging and insightful documentaries on contemporary realities."

== Filmography ==
A limited selection of her films is the following:

- 2006: Lettre à ma soeur (Letter to my Sister)
- 2008: Autrement Citoyens (Otherwise Citizens)
- 2010: Retour à la montagne (Return to the Mountains)
- 2011: Avant de franchir la ligne d'horizon (Before Passing the Horizon Line)
