= Jahan-e Ketab =

Persian monthly literary magazine in Iran

- Categories: Literary criticism
- Frequency: Monthly
- Publisher: Tali'e Khademiyan
- Founded: 1995; 30 years ago
- Country: Iran
- Based in: Tehran
- Language: Persian
- Website: jahaneketab.ir
- ISSN: 1681-9705

Jahan-e Ketab (Persian: جهان کتاب, lit. 'The World of Books') is a Persian-language monthly literary magazine and a platform in Iran.

== History and profile ==
Jahan-e Ketab was founded in 1995 in Tehran and is being published in the Persian language. The monthly magazine also focuses on neighboring countries. It publishes literary critic articles.

In 2001 Jahan-e Ketab was honored with one of the international Prince Claus Awards.
