= Nidia Bustos =

Nicaraguan theater director, community organizer and cultural activist

Nidia Bustos is a Nicaraguan theater director, community organizer and cultural activist. She founded the theater organization MECATE that meanwhile consists of more than 80 theater and music groups.

== Life ==
Bustos was born in 1952. In 1980 she started her life-work, MECATE, a theater organization the grew out to be a nationwide organization with more than 80 theater and music groups.

After the era of suppression by the Somoza-regime (1936-1979), the social structures of little farmers (campesinos) had disappeared. With the foundation of the theater organization, Bustos has the objective to work at the reconstruction of the country by developing more social cohesion between the rural communities. MECATE (Movimiento de Expresión Campesina Artística y Teatral) can be translated to Campesino Movement of Rural Artistic and Theatrical Expression.

With her organization Bustos stages plays and songs, and publishes stories and poems. On stage she uses costumes and theatrical property that originate from the cultural tradition of the campesinos. Furthermore, she organizes workshops, meetings and exchanges.

The performances induce artistic discussions on themes like replanting, malaria prevention, agricultural techniques, land speculation, and the consequences of trade pacts.

Bustos is also a member of the foundation Luciérnaga, which translated means firefly. This is a nonprofit organization that arranges audiovisual means for educational objectives.

== Recognition ==
=== Award ===
In 2011 Bustos was honored with a Prince Claus Award from the Netherlands in the category Breaking taboos.

=== Films ===
In 1982, a first documentary was on MECATE was recorded, called Otro Gallo Nos Canta. The documentary was produced by Félix Zurita. The same year Zurita produced another documentary on the organization, called Perú, ni leche ni gloria. Both documentaries have a duration of 50 minutes. In 1986 another documentary appeared, called How Campesinos Are Creating Theater and Art in Revolutionary Nicaragua.

In 2005 Zurita made a short theater film of 50 minutes. In this film the complete cast was formed by members of MECATE.
