= The Book Café (Zimbabwe) =

Book Café
- Established: 1993, reopened in 2012
- Mission: Promotion of cultural expression
- President: Paul Brickhill (creative director)
- Owner: Pamberi Trust
- Location: Samora Machel Avenue, Harare, Zimbabwe
- Website: http://zimbabwearts.org

The Book Café is a platform for free cultural expression in Harare, Zimbabwe, since 1993. Book Café operates in partnership with leading cultural NGO Pamberi Trust to offer entertainment to the public and a space for artistic development – especially a platform for younger artists.

== Background ==
In the first eight years after its foundation, the Book Café organized 7,500 concerts and events, 650 public debates, 70 book presentations and 35 theater performances, and offered its stage to 150 international touring acts. The Book Café was originally created by Paul Brickhill, in order for his band, Luck Street Blues featuring Miriam Mandipira, David Ndoro and his son Tomas Brickhill, to have a venue. Among the nearly 1000 concerts the band performed between 1995 and 2005, most of them took place at The Book Café.

Book Café is a Community Arts Centre, a space where artists and the public can meet and share ideas and inspiration. Book Café has been credited with the reevaluation of many traditional forms of music, particularly of jazz fusion and African jazz. For instance, it resulted in the increase of popularity of the use of the traditional mbira by young people.

One fifth of the budget originates from sponsors. The remaining income comes from the revenue of consumptions and entrance fee.

== Temporary closure and move ==
Book Café was served with notice of eviction from its Fife Avenue location in 2011. On 1 January 2012 it ceased operating. That year events and concerts fell to 276 from a peak of 909 (2011, in twin venues including Mannenberg), since the theatre was closed for 5 months and operated partially for another 4 months. In mid-March 2012 the Book Café was reopened at a new location, at the Samora Machel Avenue on the corner of the Sixth Street. The opening was heralded by two five-hour concerts. The new theatre is bigger, and the Book Café bookshop, closed in 2008, re-opened later in the year. Book Café was the first African theatre to become a Prince Claus Award laureate.
