= Bare (Barb Jungr album) =

Studio album by Barb Jungr
- Released: May 1999
- Recorded: 27 April 1999, Conway Hall, London, UK
- Genre: European cabaret
- Length: 50:32
- Label: Irregular Records
- Producer: Felix McIntosh, Lesley Willis

Barb Jungr chronology
Durga Rising (1996)	Bare (1999)	Chanson: The Space in Between (2000)

Professional ratings
Review scores
Source	Rating
AllMusic	(4/5) link

Bare is a 1999 album by Barb Jungr.

== Track listing ==
1. "King of the Road" (Roger Miller) – 2:45
  Originally recorded by various artists from 1964 onward
  Version performed by Roger Miller originally a single (1965)
2. "Waterloo Sunset" (Ray Davies) – 3:32
  Originally from the Kinks album Something Else by the Kinks (1967)
  Later version performed by Barb Jungr featured on her album Waterloo Sunset (2003)
3. "Where Are You Now?" (Russell Churney, Barb Jungr) – 3:30
4. "Au Depart" (Robb Johnson) – 6:36
  Originally from the Robb Johnson album The Big Wheel (1999)
5. "Me and Bobby McGee" (Fred Foster, Kris Kristofferson) – 7:11
  Originally recorded by various artists from 1969 onward
  Version performed by Kris Kristofferson originally from his album Kristofferson (1970)
6. "What Lovers Do" (Jungr, James Tomalin) – 3:36
7. "Les Amants D'Un Jour" (Marguerite Monnot, Claude Délècluse, Michelle Senlis) – 3:35
  Originally recorded by Édith Piaf on 8 February 1956
8. "What a Waste!" (Charlie Charles, Ian Dury, Mick Gallagher, Rod Melvin, John Turnbull, Norman Watt-Roy) – 3:53
  Originally from the Ian Dury single What a Waste!/Wake Up and Make Love with Me (April 1978)
9. "My Father" (Judy Collins) – 4:15
  Originally from the Judy Collins album Who Knows Where the Time Goes (1968)
10. "Sons of..." (Jacques Brel, Gérard Jouannest, Mort Shuman) – 4:52
  Originally recorded as "Fils de..." by Jacques Brel on 2 January 1967, and released on his album Jacques Brel '67 (1967)
11. "Suzanne" (Leonard Cohen) – 3:25
  Originally from the Judy Collins album In My Life (1966)
  Version performed by Leonard Cohen originally from his album Songs of Leonard Cohen (1968)
12. "Dancers to the Dawn" (Jungr, Sarah Travis) – 3:16

== Personnel ==
=== Musicians ===
- Barb Jungr – vocals
- Russell Churney – piano

=== Other personnel ===
- Felix McIntosh – recording
- Lesley Willis – recording
- Robb Johnson – design
- Tony Warren – design
- Garry Laybourn – photography
