= Gypsy Rider =

Song by Gene Clark & Carla Olson

from the album So Rebellious a Lover
- Language: English
- Released: 1987
- Genre: Country rock
- Label: Rhino Records
- Songwriter(s): Gene Clark
- Producer(s): Michael Huey with Gene Clark & Carla Olson

"Gypsy Rider" is a song written by Gene Clark, and performed by Clark and Carla Olson on the album So Rebellious a Lover, released 1987. The song was released as the A-side on a promo single the following year, given away for free with issue No. 24 of Bucketfull of Brains magazine. The B-side was "Flyaway" performed by The Seers.

Rolling Stone ranked "Gypsy Rider" as one of his 21 best songs.

== Midnight Choir's version ==
"Gypsy Rider"

Single by Midnight Choir

from the album Midnight Choir
- Released: September 1994
- Genre: Country rock
- Label: Fjording (Promid 003)
- Songwriter(s): Gene Clark
- Producer(s): Andrew Hardin

Midnight Choir singles chronology
"Mercy on the Street" (1994)	"Gypsy Rider" (1994)	"Talk to me" (1994)

The Norwegian band Midnight Choir recorded a version of the song, which was released as a promotional single and on their debut album, both during 1994.

The song was also included on their compilation album, All Tomorrows Tears: The Best of Midnight Choir, released in 2005.

=== Personnel ===
- Paal Flaata – Vocal
- Atle Byström – ??
- Ron Olsen – Bass guitar
- Mike Hardwick – Acoustic guitar
- Alison Young – Backing vocal
- Tore Wildhauer – Drums
- Andrew Hardin – Electric guitar (rhythm)
