= Andrew Hardin =

American guitarist and record producer

- Genres: Rock music, folk music, country music
- Occupations: Musician, record producer
- Instrument: Guitar

Andrew Hardin (born in 1955 near Baltimore, Maryland) is an American guitarist and record producer. Andrew's guitar style has been influenced by Roy Buchanan, Clarence White, Ry Cooder, Gabby Pahinui, and Grady Martin, with shades of blues, rock, R&B, country, tropical, and Spanish music.

== Biography ==
=== Early years ===
Hardin began as a drummer at age eight, and learned guitar and ukulele as a teenager in Hawaii. He played progressive country in California in the mid-seventies, major-label rock with the Dingoes from Australia, and blues with ex-John Lee Hooker associate Eddie Kirkland.

=== Russell and Hardin ===
Working as a cab driver in New York City in 1980, Hardin met Tom Russell, who was also driving a cab. One of Russell's fares was Grateful Dead lyricist Robert Hunter, which led to a gig opening for Hunter at the Lonestar Cafe in New York. Russell and Hardin performed around the city, and, after an agent heard them, they toured Norway and recorded three albums there (which were later released in the U.S. on Philo).

Russell and Hardin recorded and toured internationally, recording over twenty albums from the early 1990s through 2005. Hardin accompanied Russell twice on the "Late Night with David Letterman" television show.

=== Hardin Burns ===
Hardin and vocalist Jeannie Burns compose, record, and perform as Hardin Burns. Their album Lounge was self-released in 2012. Down The Deep Well, released in 2014, was co-produced by Gabe Rhodes and features drummer Dony Wynn and upright bassist David Carroll.

=== Production and Support ===
Hardin's role as co-producer of the Tom Russell Band recordings of the mid-eighties led to a career producing other major and independent label acts in the U.S., Canada, and Europe.

Hardin produced the 2002 recording "In Demand" by Norwegian singer Paal Flaata for Universal Music. Hardin has also performed over the years with artists such as Dave Alvin, Jimmy LaFave, Katy Moffatt, Nanci Griffith, Eliza Gilkyson, and Ray Wylie Hubbard.

Hardin is featured soloing on the 2002 Nanci Griffith DVD "Winter Marquee." Andrew played the riveting electric guitar solo on "Welcome Back," the opening cut and single off Eliza Gilkyson's 2002 CD "Lost and Found."

=== Recordings ===
Hardin has recorded "Just Like This Train," a collection of vocals and instrumentals from 2002, and Coney Island Moon featuring Albert Lee.

In 2005, Hardin released "Blue Acoustic," a collection of instrumental acoustic guitar duets with songwriters Dave Alvin, Ray Wylie Hubbard, Eliza Gilkyson, Tom Russell, cowboy singer Don Edwards, and bassist Washtub Jerry.

=== !AH HA! ===
Andrew Hardin and Hank Alrich met at Folk Alliance International 2008 in Memphis, Tennessee, when they accompanied the late Audrey Auld-Mezera. In 2015, Alrich organized their first billing as !AH HA!.

== Discography ==
=== Solo albums ===
- 1996: Coney Island Moon (Round Tower)
- 1998: Lunchtime at an Alligator Farm (Round Tower)
- 2002: Just Like This Train (self-released)
- 2005: Blue Acoustic (self-released)
- 2012: Lost Pines (self-released) compilation of early recordings

=== With Tom Russell ===
- 1984: Heart on a Sleeve (End of the Trail)
- 1987: Road To Bayamon (Mega)
- 1989. Poor Man's Dream (Sonet)
- 1991: Cowboy Real (Philo)
- 1991: Hurricane Season (Philo)
- 1992: Box of Visions (Stony Plain)
- 1993: Hillbilly Voodoo (East Side Digital) with Barrence Whitfield
- 1993: Cowboy Mambo (East Side Digital) with Barrence Whitfield
- 1995: The Rose of the San Joaquin (Round Tower / HighTone)
- 1997: Song of the West (HighTone)
- 1997: The Long Way Around (HighTone)
- 1998: The Man From God Knows Where (HighTone / Kirkelig Kulturverksted)
- 2001: Borderland (HighTone)
- 2003: Modern Art (HighTone)
- 2004: Indians Cowboys Horses Dogs (HighTone)
- 2005: Hearts on the Line, DVD (HighTone)
- 2005: Hotwalker (HighTone)
- 2006: Love & Fear (HighTone)
- 2018: Old Songs Yet to Sing (Frontera)

=== As Hardin Burns ===
- 2012: Lounge (self-released)
- 2014: Down the Deep Well (self-released)

=== As primary artist/song contributor ===
- 2016: various artists Just Love: A Tribute to Audrey Auld Mezera (Reckless) – track 1-08, "Bread and Roses"

=== As producer ===
- 1988: Katy Moffatt – Walkin' on the Moon (Philo / Red Moon)
- 1994: Midnight Choir – Midnight Choir (Fjording)
- 1996: Flying Norwegians – Still Riding (Norske Gram)
- 1996: Tine Valand – She's Just Leavin' (Columbia)
- 1998: Katy Moffatt – Angel Town (HighTone)
- 2002: Paal Flaata – In Demand (Universal)
- 2003: Cris Cuddy – Keep the Change (Vanishing Castle)
- 2003: Steve Bice – Sixty Minutes of Sin (Sin Citizen)
- 2011: Katy Moffatt – Fewer Things (Zeppelin)

=== Also appears on ===
- 1979: The Dingoes – Orphans of the Storm (A&M)
- 1985: Act – September Field (Odeon)
- 1989: Sylvia Tyson – You Were on My Mind (Stony Plain)
- 1992: Richard Meyer – Good Life! (Shanachie)
- 1993: Katy Moffatt – Evangeline Hotel (Philo)
- 1994: Richard Meyer – A Letter from the Open Sky (Shanachie)
- 1994: Katy Moffatt – Hearts Gone Wild (Watermelon)
- 1996: Katy Moffatt – Midnight Radio (Watermelon)
- 1998: Nanci Griffith – Other Voices, Too (A Trip Back to Bountiful) (Elektra)
- 1999: Ramblin' Jack Elliott – The Long Ride (HighTone)
- 2002: Eliza Gilkyson – Lost and Found (Red House)
- 2002: Nanci Griffith – Winter Marquee (Rounder)
- 2005: various artists – KGSR Broadcasts Vol. 13 (KGSR) – track 1-04, "Tonight We Ride" (with Tom Russell)
- 2005: various artists – Elko! A Cowboy's Gathering (Western Jubilee) – track 2–16, "All This Way for the Short Ride" (with Tom Russell and Paul Zarzyski)
- 2006: CopperMoon – Songs (self-released)
- 2007: Jimmy LaFave – Cimarron Manifesto (Red House)
- 2007: various artists – The Gift: A Tribute to Ian Tyson (Stony Plain) – track 10, "Old Cheyenne" (with Tom Russell)
- 2008: Katy Moffatt – Playin' Fool: Live in Holland (Strictly Country)
- 2008: Rain Perry – Cinderblock Bookshelves (Precipitous)
- 2011: Malcolm Holcombe – To Drink the Rain (Music Road)
- 2012: John Fullbright – From the Ground Up (Blue Dirt / Thirty Tigers)
