= Not Dark Yet =

1997 single by Bob Dylan

Single by Bob Dylan

from the album Time Out of Mind
- Released: August 25, 1997
- Recorded: January 1997
- Studio: Criteria Studios (Miami, FL)
- Genre: Rock
- Length: 6:29
- Label: Columbia
- Songwriter: Bob Dylan
- Producer: Daniel Lanois

Bob Dylan singles chronology
"Dignity" (1995)	"Not Dark Yet" (1997)	"Love Sick" (1998)

Time Out of Mind track listing
- 11 tracks: 1. "Love Sick"; 2. "Dirt Road Blues"; 3. "Standing in the Doorway"; 4. "Million Miles"; 5. "Tryin' to Get to Heaven"; 6. "'Til I Fell in Love with You"; 7. "Not Dark Yet"; 8. "Cold Irons Bound"; 9. "Make You Feel My Love"; 10. "Can't Wait"; 11. "Highlands"

Audio sample
- "Not Dark Yet": file; help

"Not Dark Yet" is a song by Bob Dylan, recorded in January 1997 and released in September that year as the seventh track on his album Time Out of Mind. It was also released as a single on August 25, 1997, and later anthologized on the compilation albums The Essential Bob Dylan in 2000, The Best of Bob Dylan in 2005 and Dylan in 2007. The song was produced by Daniel Lanois.

== Recording ==
"Not Dark Yet" was recorded in the early sessions for Time Out of Mind in a version that featured "a radically different feel", according to Daniel Lanois. "[The demo of 'Not Dark Yet'] was quicker and more stripped-down and [later during the formal studio sessions], he changed it into a civil war ballad".

In their book Bob Dylan All the Songs: The Story Behind Every Track, authors Philippe Margotin and Jean-Michel Guesdon describe the album version, recorded at Criteria Studios in Miami in early 1997, as one where Lanois "uses multiple instruments to fuel a sonic vision that he alone has the talent and skill to create. All the musicians contribute to this sound: Augie Meyers's organ is scored; the two drummers provide a heavy, haunting tempo; and Tony Garnier on bass moves in the depths of the sound spectrum. The guitars confer a rock-music atmosphere on the piece, but also contribute to its dreamlike ambience. Dylan delivers one of his best vocal performances on the album, touched with sincerity and resignation".

== Critical reception ==
"Not Dark Yet" received widespread acclaim upon its release in 1997 with many critics citing it as the highlight of Time Out of Mind. The refrain "It's not dark yet but it's getting there" is often interpreted as Bob Dylan, or at least the song's first-person narrator, confronting his mortality.

Gilbert Cruz, writing in a Time magazine article about "The 10 Best Bob Dylan Songs", termed it "a moving end-of-life song written and sung by an aging artist who has somehow managed to remain vital".

Rolling Stone ranked it 50th on a 2015 list of "The 100 Greatest Bob Dylan Songs", calling it "hauntingly beautiful" and noting that Dylan sang the lyric in "the weary and weathered voice of a man facing the twilight of his life".

In the "Fortitude" chapter of his book Dylan's Visions of Sin, literary scholar Christopher Ricks wrote a lengthy analysis in which he compared the song to the John Keats poem "Ode to a Nightingale", whose narrator is likewise "half in love with easeful Death". Ricks claims that, broken down line for line, "similar turns of phrase, figures of speech, [and] felicities of rhyming" can be found throughout "Not Dark Yet" and the Ode. Ricks also argues that "there is a strong affinity with Keats in the way that in the song night colours, darkens, the whole atmosphere while never being spoken of", just as Keats used winter to color and darken the atmosphere in another poem he wrote, To Autumn. "Dylan's refrain or burden is 'It's not dark yet, but it's getting there'. He bears it and bares it beautifully, with exquisite precision of voice, dry humour, and resilience, all these in the cause of fortitude at life's going to be brought to an end by death".

Spectrum Culture included the song on a list of "Bob Dylan's 20 Best Songs of the 90s". In an article accompanying the list, critic Peter Tabakis wrote, "The song’s languid, fatalistic beauty no doubt makes it his most beguiling composition since 'Blind Willie McTell'. Regret saturates every raspy couplet. Cynicism pervades this reflexive evaluation of a life lived. The Reaper’s a knock, knock, knockin’ on his front door." Yet Tabakis, writing in 2020, also noted that, in spite of the song's despairing tone, it provides catharsis: “'Not Dark Yet' offers succor, something like homeopathic medicine. There's a reason many of us rushed to revisit Soderbergh’s Contagion when a real-life pandemic broke out earlier this year. That impulse goes straight back to Ancient Greece, to the birth of tragedy – catharsis. On 'Not Dark Yet', Dylan is at once our Aeschylus and Agamemnon, the tragedian and tragic hero. Bad shit may be timeless, but reality can, by contrast, be a little bit better than fiction. Cold comfort. And comforting, nonetheless".

Ultimate Classic Rock critic Matthew Wilkening rated "Not Dark Yet" as the 3rd best song Dylan recorded between 1992 and 2011, praising it as "a stately, surprisingly clear-sung accounting of a painful life from a man who sees the end closing in on him".

A 2021 Guardian article included it on a list of "80 Bob Dylan songs everyone should know".

== Music video ==
An official music video for the song, directed by Michael B. Borofsky, was filmed in Memphis, Tennessee, in October 1997. The video juxtaposes both color and black-and-white footage of Dylan and his band (including Larry Campbell on electric guitar and Bucky Baxter on pedal steel guitar), performing the song on stage at the New Daisy Theatre on Beale Street, with black-and-white footage of the city outside. The video was released in March 1998, the month after Time Out of Mind won three Grammy Awards including one for Album of the Year. Another music video was shot for the song "Love Sick" at the same location on the same day, featuring Dylan and model Rachel DiPaolo, but it has never been released.

== Cultural references ==
The line "She wrote me a letter and she wrote it so kind" is a quote from the traditional folk song "Red River Shore".

The line "I was born here and I'll die here against my will" is a paraphrase of a Talmudic passage from the Pirkei Avot (Ethics of the Fathers), Chapter 4, verse 22: "Let not your heart convince you that the grave is your escape; for against your will you are formed, against your will you are born, against your will you live, against your will you die, and against your will you are destined to give a judgement and accounting before the king, king of all kings, the Holy One, blessed be He".

== Other versions ==
The Bootleg Series Vol. 17: Fragments - Time Out Of Mind Sessions (1996–1997), released on January 27, 2023, contains a version of the original album track remixed by Michael Brauer as well as two studio outtakes of the song and a live version from 2000. On January 11, 2023, Dylan released a new video of one of the outtakes, in which the song is accompanied by a montage of archival photographs, to promote the album's release.

== Live versions ==
Dylan has played the song live 191 times on the Never Ending Tour between 1997 and 2019. Dylan performed the song with Eric Clapton at Madison Square Garden in New York City on June 30, 1999, at a benefit for the Crossroads Centre in Antigua, a concert that was later broadcast on television and released on home video. A live version from September 22, 2000, performed in Sheffield, England, is included on The Bootleg Series Vol. 17: Fragments - Time Out Of Mind Sessions (1996–1997). The song's live debut occurred at the Columbus Civic Center in Columbus, Georgia on October 30, 1997, and the last performance (to date) took place at The Mitsubishi Electric Hall in Dusseldorf, Germany, on October 27, 2026.

== Cover versions ==
"Not Dark Yet" has been covered by many artists. Among the most notable covers:

- Robyn Hitchcock covered it for his 2002 album of Dylan covers Robyn Sings
- Barb Jungr for her 2002 album Every Grain of Sand: Barb Jungr Sings Bob Dylan
- Julie Felix for her 2002 album Starry Eyed and Laughing
- Kirsti Huke for her 2007 album Deloo
- Jimmy LaFave for his 2007 album Cimarron Manifesto
- Eric Clapton played it live during his 2009 Ireland/UK tour
- Silversun Pickups for the Chimes of Freedom compilation in 2012
- Trey Gunn for his 2015 album The Waters, They Are Rising
- Ruby Amanfu for her 2015 album Standing Still, which takes its title from a phrase in the song
- Allison Moorer and Shelby Lynne for their 2017 collaborative album Not Dark Yet, which takes its title from the song
- Calum Scott for his 2018 album Only Human
- Lucinda Williams for her 2020 live album Lu's Jukebox Vol. 3 - Bob's Back Pages: A Night Of Bob Dylan Songs
- Tom Jones for the expanded edition of his 2021 album Surrounded by Time
- Dave Gahan & Soulsavers for their 2021 album Imposter
- Jeff Tweedy as part of his October, 2025, Starship Casual Substack recordings

== Inclusion on soundtracks ==
"Not Dark Yet" has been prominently featured on the soundtracks of many films and television shows, including Wonder Boys, The Passion of the Christ: Songs Inspired by The Passion of the Christ, Why We Fight, the Dylan-starring Masked and Anonymous, Life Itself, the Showtime series Californication (Season 3, Episode 3), Deadwood (Season 2 premiere "A Lie Agreed Upon, Part 1"), After Life (Season 3, Episode 2), Henry Poole Is Here, Knockaround Guys, and Richard Linklater's Last Flag Flying, where the song plays in its entirety over the closing credits. "Not Dark Yet" played on the soundtrack of the opening of Episode 2, Season 3 of After Life.

== Track listings for CD singles ==
CD (COL 665443 2):

1. "Not Dark Yet" – 6:29
2. "Tombstone Blues" (Live) – 6:26
3. "Ballad of a Thin Man" (Live) – 8:47
4. "Boots of Spanish Leather" (Live) – 6:35

2-track CD (COL 665443 1):

1. "Not Dark Yet" – 6:29
2. "Tombstone Blues" (Live) – 6:26

Not Dark Yet: Dylan Alive Vol. 2 Japanese EP:

1. "Not Dark Yet" – 6:29
2. "Boots of Spanish Leather" (Live) – 6:34
3. "Tears of Rage" (Live) – 7:20
4. "Senor (Tales of Yankee Power)" (Live) – 4:39

== Notes ==
- "Tombstone Blues" and "Ballad of a Thin Man" were recorded live at the House of Blues, Atlanta, GA; August 4, 1996.
- "Boots of Spanish Leather" was recorded live at the House of Blues, Atlanta, GA; August 3, 1996.
