= Chanson (disambiguation) =

Chanson (French for "song") can refer to:

== Music ==
- Chanson (band), a 1970s disco group
- The French chanson, songs from the late Middle Ages to modern times, including lyric-driven French songs in the cabaret style
- Chanson de geste, a medieval French epic poetry form
- Nouvelle Chanson, a new style of popular music originating in France
- Russian Chanson, a genre of Russian music
- Canso (song) or canson, a song style used by early troubadours

=== Pieces ===
- Trois Chansons (Ravel)

=== Albums ===
- Chanson: The Space In Between, an album by Barb Jungr
- Chansons (Élie Semoun album), 2003
- Chansons (Jill Barber album), 2013

== Brands ==
- Citroën Saxo or Citroën Chanson, a French car sold in Japan
