= Chanson: The Space in Between =

Studio album by Barb Jungr
- Released: August 2000
- Recorded: 19–21 December 1999
- Studio: The Dairy Studios, London
- Genre: European cabaret
- Length: 56:02
- Label: Linn Records
- Producer: Calum Malcolm

Barb Jungr chronology
Bare (1999)	Chanson: The Space in Between (2000)	Every Grain of Sand: Barb Jungr Sings Bob Dylan (2002)

Professional ratings
Review scores
Source	Rating
Allmusic	(4.5/5)

Chanson: The Space in Between is a 2000 album by Barb Jungr.

== Track listing ==
1. "Ne me quitte pas" (Jacques Brel, Des de Moor) – 5:32
  Originally recorded by Jacques Brel on 11 September 1959, and released on his album La Valse à mille temps (1959).
2. "Sunday Morning, St Denis" (Robb Johnson) – 6:29
  Originally from the Roy Bailey album Business as Usual (1994)
3. "I Love Paris" (Cole Porter) – 3:50
  Originally from the Cole Porter musical Can-Can, set in Paris in 1893. The original production opened at the Shubert Theatre, New York, USA, 7 May 1953. The original cast recording was made on 17 May 1953, and released as an album in 1953.
4. "Les Marquises" (Brel, Johnson) – 6:32
  Originally recorded by Jacques Brel on 1 October 1977, and released on his album Les Marquises (1977)
5. "Cri du cœur" (Henri Crolla, Fran Landesman, Jacques Prévert) – 2:40
  Originally recorded by Édith Piaf on 20 May 1960
6. "Quartier Latin" (Léo Ferré, de Moor) – 5:13
  Originally from the Léo Ferré album Léo Ferré (1967)
7. "Marieke" (Brel, de Moor) – 4:02
  Originally recorded by Jacques Brel on 12 April 1961, and released on his album 5 (1961)
8. "April in Paris" (Vernon Duke, Yip Harburg) – 2:48
  Originally from the Vernon Duke/Yip Harburg revue Walk a Little Faster (1932). The original production opened at the St James Theatre, New York, USA, 7 December 1932.
9. "La chanson des vieux amants" (Brel, de Moor, Gérard Jouannest) – 5:56
  Originally recorded by Jacques Brel on 3 January 1967, and released on his album Jacques Brel '67 (1967)
10. "New Amsterdam" (Elvis Costello) – 3:32
  Originally from the Elvis Costello and the Attractions album Get Happy!! (1980)
11. "Les Poètes" (Ferré, de Moor) – 3:19
  Originally from the Léo Ferré album Paname (1961)
12. "The Space In Between" (Barb Jungr, James Tomalin) – 3:14
13. "No Regrets" (Hal Davis, Charles Dumont, Michel Vaucaire) – 2:48
  Originally recorded as "Non, je ne regrette rien" by Édith Piaf on 10 November 1960

== Personnel ==
=== Musicians ===
- Barb Jungr - vocals
- Russell Churney - piano (tracks 1, 4, 7, 9–10)
- Simon Wallace - piano (tracks 3, 5, 8, 13)
- Kim Burton - accordion (tracks 2, 3, 5, 7–9, 11), piano (tracks 6, 11–12), kaval (track 4)
- Rolf Wilson - violin (tracks 3, 5–6, 8, 11–13)
- Julie Walkington - double bass
- James Tomalin - samples (tracks 1, 5–7, 10, 12)
- Kevin Hathway - percussion (tracks 2, 4–6, 10, 12)

=== Other personnel ===
- Calum Malcolm - engineer, mixing, mastering
- Ben Turner - post-production
- John Haxby - design, photography
- Douglas Gibb - photography
