= Rock Bottom =

Rock Bottom may refer to:

== Music ==
- Rock Bottom (album), by Robert Wyatt, 1974
- Rock Bottom, by Phreshboyswag, 2023

=== Songs ===
- "Rock Bottom" (Hailee Steinfeld song), 2016
- "Rock Bottom" (Lynsey de Paul and Mike Moran song), 1977
- "Rock Bottom" (Wynonna Judd song), 1994
- "Rock Bottom", by Amy Macdonald from This Is the Life
- "Rock Bottom", by Babyface from For the Cool in You
- "Rock Bottom", by Benny Carter from Further Definitions
- "Rock Bottom", by Caspa and Rusko from FabricLive.37
- "Rock Bottom", by the Dandy Warhols from The Dandy Warhols Are Sound
- "Rock Bottom", by Eminem from The Slim Shady LP
- "Rock Bottom", by Five Finger Death Punch from And Justice for None
- "Rock Bottom", by Jimmy Needham from Clear the Stage
- "Rock Bottom", by Joe Lynn Turner from Under Cover 2
- "Rock Bottom", by K-Solo from Time's Up
- "Rock Bottom", by Kenny Chesney from The Big Revival
- "Rock Bottom", by Kiss from Dressed to Kill
- "Rock Bottom", by Little Walter, B-side to "Key to the Highway"
- "Rock Bottom", by Midnight Choir from Midnight Choir
- "Rock Bottom", by MisterWives from Superbloom
- "Rock Bottom", by Modern Baseball from You're Gonna Miss It All
- "Rock Bottom", by Neck Deep from Life's Not out to Get You
- "Rock Bottom", by Pitbull from El Mariel
- "Rock Bottom", by Sebastian Bach from Bach 2: Basics
- "Rock Bottom", by T-Pain from Revolver
- "Rock Bottom", by Tesla from Real to Reel
- "Rock Bottom", by UFO from Phenomenon

== Television ==
- "Rock Bottom?", an episode of Code Lyoko
- "Rock Bottom" (Citizen Smith), a 1979 episode
- "Rock Bottom" (Dawson's Creek), a 2003 episode
- "Rock Bottom" (Runaways), a 2018 episode
- "Rock Bottom" (SpongeBob SquarePants), a 2000 episode
- "Rock Bottom" (Transformers: Prime), a 2011 episode
- Rock Bottom, a cartoon character on the 1960s television cartoon series Felix the Cat
- Rock Bottom, a fictional television show in the Simpsons episode "Homer Badman"

== Other uses ==
- Rock Bottom: In Your House, a 1998 professional wrestling pay-per-view event
- "Rock Bottom" or Side Slam, the finishing move, for which the PPV event was named, of Dwayne "The Rock" Johnson
- Rock Bottom Restaurants Inc., a subsidiary of CraftWorks Holdings, an American restaurant company
- Hitting rock bottom, a concept in alcoholism and addiction.
