= Waterloo Sunset (album) =

Studio album by Barb Jungr
- Released: 3 November 2003
- Recorded: September 2003
- Studio: Mark Angel Studios, London
- Genre: European cabaret
- Length: 54:44
- Label: Linn
- Producer: Adrian York

Barb Jungr chronology
Every Grain of Sand: Barb Jungr Sings Bob Dylan (2002)	Waterloo Sunset (2003)

Professional ratings
Review scores
Source	Rating
Allmusic	4/5 stars

Waterloo Sunset is an album by Barb Jungr released in 2003 (See 2003 in music).

== Track listing ==
1. "Do You Play Guitar?" (Barb Jungr, Adrian York) – 3:53
2. "High Water (for Charley Patton)" (Bob Dylan) – 5:49
  Originally from the Bob Dylan album Love and Theft (2001)
3. "Cathy's Clown" (Don Everly, Phil Everly) – 3:35
  Originally from the Everly Brothers album The Everly Brothers' Best (1959)
4. "This Masquerade" (Leon Russell) – 5:09
  Originally from the Howard Roberts album Sounds (1970)
  Version performed by Leon Russell originally from his album Carney (1972)
5. "The Great Valerio" (Richard Thompson) – 3:49
  Originally from the Richard and Linda Thompson album I Want to See the Bright Lights Tonight (1974)
6. "When Do the Bells Ring for Me?" (Charles De Forest) – 2:54
  Originally from the Tony Bennett album Astoria: Portrait of the Artist (1990)
7. "Written Down in the Dark Again" (Christine Collister, Jungr) – 5:26
8. "Like a Rolling Stone" (Dylan) – 6:03
  Originally from the Bob Dylan album Highway 61 Revisited (1965)
9. "Lipstick Lips Lament" (Russell Churney, Jungr) – 4:22
10. "Laugh, Clown, Laugh" (Ted Fiorito, Sam M Lewis, Joe Young) – 3:30
  Originally the title theme from the film Laugh, Clown, Laugh (dir Herbert Brenon) (1928)
11. "Waterloo Sunset" (Ray Davies) – 4:32
  Originally from the Kinks album Something Else by the Kinks (1967)
  Earlier version performed by Barb Jungr featured on her album Bare (1999)
12. "The Joker" (Eddie Curtis, Ahmet Ertegun, Steve Miller) – 5:35
  Originally from the Steve Miller Band album The Joker (1973)

== Personnel ==
=== Musicians ===
- Barb Jungr - vocals, harmonica
- Matt Backer - guitar
- Adrian York - piano
- Stuart Hall - violin (on track 5)
- Geoff Gascoyne - double bass
- Nic France - drums

=== Other personnel ===
- Calum Malcolm - engineer, mixing
- Kevan Gallagher - engineer
- Ben - post-production
- John Haxby - design, photography
- Garry Laybourn - photography
- Corinne Manoe - make-up
- Sean - hair
- Jason - hair
