= Just Like a Woman (disambiguation) =

"Just Like a Woman" is a 1966 song by Bob Dylan.

Just Like a Woman may also refer to:

- Just Like a Woman (1908 film), by Gilbert M. Anderson
- Just Like a Woman (1912 film)
- Just like a Woman (1923 film)
- Just like a Woman (1939 film)
- Just like a Woman (1967 film)
- Just like a Woman (1992 film)
- Just like a Woman (2012 film)
- Just Like a Woman (Kikki Danielsson album), a 1981 album by Kikki Danielsson
- Just Like a Woman (Barb Jungr album), a 2008 album by Barb Jungr
