= Durga Rising =

Album by Barb Jungr

Studio album by Barb Jungr, Kuljit Bhamra and Russell Churney
- Released: 1997 Re-released 2011 Keda Records with additional previously unreleased tracks
- Studio: Red Fort Studios, London, UK
- Genre: Bhangra, jazz, blues, rhythm and blues
- Length: 51:25
- Label: Keda Records
- Producer: Kuljit Bhamra, Christoph Bracher, Russell Churney, Barb Jungr

Durga Rising is a studio album by the artists Barb Jungr, Kuljit Bhamra and Russell Churney, containing 11 original songs by the trio and 4 covering versions, released in 1997.

== Track listing ==
1. "The Cutter" (Pete DeFreitas, Ian McCulloch, Les Pattinson, Will Sergeant) – 3:45
  Originally from the Echo and the Bunnymen single The Cutter/Way Out and Up We Go (1983) and the Echo and the Bunnymen album Porcupine (1983)
2. "Still Moving" (Kuljit Bhamra, Barb Jungr) – 3:06
3. "Choose to be Alone" (Russell Churney, Barb Jungr) – 3:41
4. "Bombay Dreaming" (Barb Jungr, James Tomalin) – 3:52
5. "Crimes Against Nature" (Barb Jungr, James Tomalin) – 4:02
6. "Unchain My Heart" (Freddy James, Agnes Jones) – 3:12
  Originally from the Frances Faye album Caught in the Act: At the Thunderbird, Las Vegas (1958)
7. "Spit It Out" (Barb Jungr, Michael Parker) – 5:40
8. "Go Down Easy" (John Martyn) – 5:10
  Originally from the John Martyn album Solid Air (1973)
9. "Tears in a Bottle" (Barb Jungr, Parker) – 3:19
10. "Blind Willie McTell" (Bob Dylan) – 8:48
  Originally from the Bob Dylan album The Bootleg Series: Vols 1-3 (1991)
11. "Train on the Move" (Barb Jungr, James Tomalin) – 6:47

== Personnel ==
=== Musicians ===
- Barb Jungr - vocals, harmonica, mandolin
- Russell Churney - piano, keyboards
- Kuljit Bhamra - percussion
- James Tomalin - guitar, banjo
- Stan Adler - cello

=== Other personnel ===
- Christoph Bracher - engineer
- Mital Mehta - studio assistant
- Barb Jungr - design
- Dibble - design
- Garry Laybourn - photography
- Caren Grossman - administration
