= Sticky Moments =

Television series

- Also known as: Sticky Moments on Tour (1990)
- Created by: Julian Clary; Paul Merton
- Presented by: Julian Clary
- Starring: Russell Churney; Philip Herbert; Barb Jungr; Michael Parker; Hugh Jelly
- Country of origin: United Kingdom
- Original language: English
- No. of series: 2
- No. of episodes: 20 (inc. 1 special)

Production
- Running time: 45 minutes (inc. adverts)
- Production company: Wonderdog Productions

Original release
- Network: Channel 4
- Release: 17 October 1989 – 19 December 1990

Sticky Moments (also known as Sticky Moments with Julian Clary and Julian's Seminal Moments) is a British television comedy game show that was broadcast on Channel 4. Two series were made, the first in 1989 and the second in 1990. It was hosted by the comedian Julian Clary.

== Production ==
The series was devised and written by Clary with the fellow comedian and writer Paul Merton, and was produced by Clary's production company Wonderdog Productions (named after his beloved pet whippet mongrel "Fanny the Wonderdog", who also sometimes appeared on the show). Channel 4 commissioned the series following Clary's appearances on the short-lived ITV comedy game show Trick or Treat in early 1989. Sticky Moments was made some months before transmission commenced in October 1989, with the pilot episode actually filmed in the spring of that year. Clary himself commented in a May 1989 interview: "...Channel 4 was a bit wary of giving us the money, but it all worked out quite well. I think it's good because we've kept control all the way through. If lots of people are putting in their twopenny worth, the original idea, which can be quite fragile, gets lost."

Clary was accompanied by two co-hosts, his "steadfastly heterosexual" pianist, Russell Churney, who provided musical accompaniment and a foil for Clary's teasing, and announcer/scorekeeper/assistant Hugh Jelly – a large man with a booming voice, usually dressed almost as flamboyantly as Clary himself. Hugh Jelly appeared from the second episode onwards, while Clary's assistant in the first episode was "Barbara Lomax" (played by Jane Janovic). Further musical accompaniment was provided by the duo Barb Jungr & Michael Parker, who assisted Clary when he performed a comical musical number at the end of each show.

Various celebrity guests made appearances, usually assisting in a game round, including Harry Enfield, Nicholas Parsons, Dora Bryan, Barbara Windsor, Fenella Fielding, Bill Oddie, The Beverley Sisters and Mike Smith (who had previously worked with Clary on the aforementioned comedy game show Trick or Treat and was a regular target of Clary's jokes). In some episodes, actor/newscaster Gordon Honeycombe acted as scoreboard announcer.

== Premise ==
Clary, in customary full make-up and dressed in a new outrageous outfit each week, selected contestants for the night's show from the audience members queuing outside. Once in the studio, contestants were introduced by him and were then subjected to some light-hearted teasing based on their personal details and appearance.

The competition aspect of the show included general knowledge quizzes, practical challenges such as painting and crafts, and performance based challenges such as dancing, singing and acting. The show would often play like a spoof of The Generation Game, with the questions, answers, challenges and cheap prizes being deliberately off-centre, and rife with gay innuendo and double entendres, played for laughs rather than actual competition.

Contestants were eliminated round-by-round, based on Clary's mostly arbitrary point allocation. Losing players were given a plaster bust of Fanny the Wonderdog as a consolation prize, with the eventual lucky winner receiving a prize of barely more value (wine/champagne, flowers, plastic tiara, etc.). At the end of each show, following a musical number by Clary and Co, the winner was then seen stepping into a chauffeur-driven car, whilst the runner-up was left to go home by less glamorous means (bicycle, wheelbarrow, etc.).

Following the end of the first series, which concluded with a live New Year's Eve Special, a second series was shown in late 1990. The second series was officially titled Sticky Moments on Tour with Julian Clary, although the format was essentially identical to the first series with the addition of painted studio backdrops and props to humorously pretend the show was taking place in exotic international locations (France, Australia, Japan, and an episode based at the less exotic Newport Pagnell).

Clary also performed a live version of Sticky Moments on his UK national stage tour in 1990, with contestants plucked from the audience.

== Reception ==
Writing in The Observer after viewing the pilot episode, Susan Jeffreys wrote; "The Sticky Moments pilot is very funny. The Chagall-inspired set looks beautiful, and the whole product is a good vehicle for Clary's patter."

Also writing in The Observer regarding the pilot episode, Jennifer Selway commented; "(Clary) has the implacable calm of a strict primary school teacher - albeit one dressed in pink and green PVC - as he disciplines the hapless contestants in his game show. (...) Very funny, though perhaps it could have been kept to 30 rather than 45 minutes."

Writing in The Guardian following the pilot episode, Nancy Banks-Smith commented; "Sticky Moments with Julian Clary was so dreadful, it was actually painful like mumps, though not as funny.(...) Poor old Jules, a pretty if limited wit, seemed to be making the whole thing up as he went along."

== Transmissions ==
=== Series ===
Series	Start date	End date	Episodes
1	17 October 1989	19 December 1989	10
2	17 October 1990	19 December 1990	10

=== Special ===
Date	Entitle
31 December 1989	Sticky New Year
