= Hope Foye =

American folk singer (1921–2025)

Frances Wainwright
- Born: 2 September 1921
- Died: 6 January 2025 (aged 103); Las Vegas, Nevada, United States
- Children: 2 daughters

Frances Hope Wainwright (2 September 1921 – 6 January 2025) was an American folk singer who performed with such artists as Pete Seeger, Paul Robeson, and The Weavers (where she was once described as the "fifth" Weaver). Red Hope? The Blacklisting of Hope Foye Documentary, 2011, ‘Permanent Productions’, Soundtrack of the film, 2011, permproductions.com.

== Life and career ==
Foye was born on September 2, 1921. She performed in Bob Fosse's first musical, Dance Me a Song, in which she premiered the song "Lilac Wine."

Foye suffered under the McCarran Committee and as a result left the United States for a career in Mexico and Europe. She died on January 6, 2025, at the age of 103 in Las Vegas.
