= Philip Herbert (actor) =

British actor (born 1957)

- Born: 28 January 1957 (age 69); London, England
- Occupation: Actor

Philip Herbert (born 28 January 1957 in London) is an English actor and mime artist, best known as his comedic alter ego, Hugh Jelly, a sidekick to comedian Julian Clary on the 1989–90 quiz show Sticky Moments.

In addition to several TV roles, Herbert appeared as Hermi Odle, one of Jabba the Hutt's henchmen in Return of the Jedi, and as Ginger in Carry On Columbus. More recently he has appeared on The Bill, Casualty, Trial & Retribution and The Family.
