= Tine Valand =

Norwegian country musician

- Born: Anne Cathrine Valand; June 15, 1963; Kristiansand
- Died: January 18, 2018 (aged 54)

Anne Cathrine "Tine" Valand (15 June 1963 – 18 January 2018) was a Norwegian country musician. Known as part of the duo Somebody's Darling, she also released the solo album She's Just Leavin' on Columbia in 1996.

== Breakthrough with Somebody's Darling ==
She was born in Kristiansand, but moved to Oslo. She attended Hartvig Nissen School, Romerike Folk High School and Sagene Teachers' College. A teacher by profession, Valand broke through in the music scene as a part of Somebody's Darling with Liz-Tove Vespestad, whom she met at a teachers' course in England. Having played smaller gigs, they were reportedly discovered when busking at the Oslo square Egertorget, and signed to Sonet Records. They released the albums Somebody's Darling (1993) and Forever for Now (1994). On the back of the Steve Wynn cover "That's Why I Wear Black", their eponymous album sold in 70,000 copies. The follow-up sold markedly less, and following a tour in Norway supporting Emmylou Harris, the duo stopped collaborating in 1995. Valand moved to Austin, Texas for one year with her boyfriend, music pundit Tom Skjeklesæther. They later moved to Halden.

== Solo album ==
She's Just Leavin'

Studio album by Tine Valand
- Released: October 1996
- Recorded: Cedar Creek Studios, Austin, Texas
- Genre: Country
- Label: Columbia
- Producer: Andrew Hardin

After Somebody's Darling was put on hold, Tine Valand released the solo album She's Just Leavin' on Columbia in October 1996. It was recorded in Austin, produced by Andrew Hardin and with a vocal contribution from Guy Clark on the duet "Mineral Wells", written by Tom Russell. Half the songs on the album were penned by Valand, the other half by American writers—the album title was a phrase out of "She Ain't Goin' Nowhere", a Guy Clark cover. Valand was also guested by Fats Kaplin, but otherwise used a backing band of Norwegian musicians; Nils Halleland, Jorun Bøgeberg, and Anders Engen. Furthermore, Manuel Cuevas contributed with a designer jacket for Valand's concerts.

=== Reception ===
The main reception of the album was moderately positive, in addition to positive and moderately negative with a slight overrepresentation of the former.

One reviewer gave the highest score, a dice throw of 6, and a number of reviewers gave a 5 out of 6. These reviewers praised the musicianship, with Levi Henriksen calling the album credible and stylistically consummate – and "difficult to top on both sides of the Atlantic".

Other reviews lacked specific grades, but still praised the album, though the "roots wave" in Norwegian music had largely subsided by 1996. Eirik Valebrokk (Arbeiderbladet) found She's Just Leavin' to be better than the Somebody's Darling albums, with a "rock solid" performance and identity. He found "pearls" in the lyrics, as did Asbjørn Bakke (Aftenposten), who also wrote that the more menial tracks on She's Just Leavin' "would tower on most other Norwegian country records".

Most reviewing publications gave a dice throw of 4. The general view here was that the album contained several good melodies, with "Mineral Wells" being a highlight, albeit the songs were a bit predictable in the roots genre. A number of reviews without specific grades also gave a moderate opinion on the album.

Some gave 3 out of 6, regarding the songs as too anonymous, and also criticized the sound of Valand's vocals, and one gave as little as 2.

By the winter of 1996, the record had been distributed in 6,000 copies.

=== Track list ===
1. "Ease This Mind" – 3:16
2. "Walk the Line" – 2:59
3. "Always" – 2:51
4. "Mother Lode" – 4:07
5. "Hold On To Me" – 3:21
6. "He'll Never Know" – 3:21
7. "Mineral Wells" – 4:20
8. "Some Hearts" – 3:23
9. "Keep Passing the Open Windows" – 3:11
10. "Out of the Snow" – 3:29
11. "She Ain't Goin' Nowhere" – 3:30
12. "My Aunt Anna" – 4:03
13. "Wings" – 2:40
14. "Invisible People" – 4:35

== Later musical career ==
Somebody's Darling reformed in 2003. They released Still Wearing Black (2003), a compilation album which also had four new songs, followed by Walls (2007).

== Personal life ==
Outside of music, Valand worked as a teacher at Rødsberg school. She had two sons with Tom Skjeklesæther, though the couple later split. She died at Lovisenberg in January 2018 from complications from breast cancer.
