= All Rise for Julian Clary =

British tv mock courtroom comedy (1996–1997)

- Genre: Light entertainment
- Presented by: Julian Clary
- Country of origin: United Kingdom
- Original language: English
- No. of series: 2
- No. of episodes: 14 (inc. 1 special)

Production
- Running time: 30 minutes

Original release
- Network: BBC2
- Release: 27 September 1996 – 22 December 1997

All Rise for Julian Clary, a British light entertainment game show, was broadcast on BBC2 from 27 September 1996 to 22 December 1997. The show centers around Clary playing a judge in a mock court room, with contestants arguing their case before Judge Julian Clary. In all cases, the loser has to do a forfeit.

== Transmissions ==
=== Series ===
Series	Start date	End date	Episodes
1	27 September 1996	8 November 1996	7
2	15 November 1997	21 December 1997	6

=== Special ===
Date	Entitle
22 December 1997	Christmas Special
