= Barb Jungr =

English singer, songwriter and theatre writer

- Born: 9 May 1954 (age 72); Rochdale, Lancashire, England
- Genres: Cabaret; jazz; pop
- Occupation: Singer
- Instrument: Vocals
- Labels: Linn; Naim; Kristalyn
- Website: barbjungr.co.uk

Barb Jungr (born 9 May 1954) is an English singer, songwriter and theatre writer, who has recorded versions of songs by Bob Dylan, Sting, Elvis Presley, Bruce Springsteen and Leonard Cohen.

== Career ==
Barb Jungr was born in Rochdale, Lancashire, England, to immigrant parents. Her father, Miroslav Jungr, was a Czech scientist who moved to Britain as a refugee after the Second World War and after incarceration in German work camps. Her mother, Ingrid, was a German nurse. The eldest of three siblings, she grew up in Stockport, Cheshire, where she attended Stockport Convent School for Girls before earning a degree from Leeds University.

Arriving in London in the mid-1970s, Jungr worked with playwright Pam Gems and composer Paul Sand, appearing as the singer at the Edinburgh Festival production of Gem's play Dead Fish, which became Dusa Fish Stas and Vi. Jungr's first single was "He's Gone", as the Stroke, released by CBS, was single of the week in New Musical Express and was written and recorded with her husband Dan Bowling.

She formed the Three Courgettes with Michael Parker and Jerry Kreeger and performed new wave versions of gospel songs in the Kings Road and Portobello Market in the late 1970s. The band was discovered by Island Records, then toured with Kid Creole and the Coconuts, Sade, Mari Wilson, and the Jets. The Three Courgettes recorded a Christmas song for Michael Zilkha's A Christmas Record.

She formed the duo Jungr and Parker with blues guitarist Michael Parker. For thirteen years they performed internationally and appeared regularly on British television and radio. They hosted the BBC Radio 2 series We Stayed in with...Jungr and Parker with specials recorded at the Edinburgh Festival and produced by Sonia Beldom. Jungr and Parker toured with Alexei Sayle and Arnold Brown, with whom they won a Perrier Award in Edinburgh in 1987 at the Gilded Balloon Theatre, and toured nationally and internationally with Julian Clary, appearing with him in the West End at the Aldwych Theatre and on Channel 4 television in Sticky Moments and Terry and Julian.

In 1991, Jungr and Parker performed in a Festival of European music in Sudan funded by the British Council. The success of that trip led to them performing and giving workshops in Cameroon, Tanzania, Malawi, and Burma. Jungr wrote about these experiences for the Guardian Diary, Folk Roots, and The Singer, and in 1994 enrolled in a masters program at Goldsmiths College in ethnomusicology for which she received a Distinction. She specialised in the Voice and Singing. During that time Jungr began to embark on solo shows, accompanied by Russell Churney, and started a solo career with the release the album Bare, which was recorded in a day, live at the Conway Hall with the support of Overtones Studios.

In the early 1990s, Jungr developed themed shows which have become her speciality: "Hell Bent Heaven Bound" (with Ian Shaw, Christine Collister and Michael Parker) was Perrier Pick of the Fringe, "Money the Final Frontier" (with Helen Watson, Christine Collister and Michael Parker) was invited to the Canadian Music Festivals. In 1998 she toured with the show Sex, Religion and Politics directed by Julia Pascal, appearing at the 1998 Edinburgh Festival. With composer James Tomalin she contributed "Jackie" to the Jacques Brel compilation album and Fear of a Red Planet.

In 1999, Jungr was invited to record for Linn Records in Glasgow. In 2000 Linn released Chanson: The Space in Between, an album of English translations of classic French chansons. In 2002, she released Every Grain of Sand, an album of arrangements of Bob Dylan's songs, followed by Waterloo Sunset in 2003.

Appearing in a New York season at the Flea Theatre in 2002, she was given the Backstage Bistro Award in 2003 for Best International Artist. In 2004 she recorded Love Me Tender, an album of songs recorded by Elvis Presley for release in March 2005, followed by Walking in the Sun (2006) featuring guitarist Eric Bibb.

In 2007, Jungr collaborated with British composer Mark Anthony Turnage, appearing with the London Sinfonietta in the commissioned piece About Water at Queen Elizabeth Hall to celebrate the reopening of the Festival Hall.

In 2008, she released Just Like a Woman – Hymn to Nina featuring the repertoire of Nina Simone and was given a Nightlife Award in New York in 2008 for Outstanding Cabaret Vocalist.

In March 2010, she released The Men I Love – The New American Songbook . She performed a second season at the Cafe Carlyle in the Carlyle Hotel in New York. In 2010 Jungr released Man in the Long Black Coat: Barb Jungr Sings Bob Dylan. In 2012 she released Stockport to Memphis.

In March 2014, Jungr released Hard Rain: the songs of Bob Dylan and Leonard Cohen and toured the UK with a season at the 59E59 Theater in New York. The album won Best Cabaret CD from BroadwayWorld.com.

Other collaborations include composer Jonathan Cooper on his "Moon Behind the Clouds" song cycle, the cabaret show Girl Talk with Mari Wilson and Claire Martin, and Gwyneth Herbert which toured intermittently for ten years and the trio Durga Rising with tabla player Kuljit Bhamra and pianist Russell Churney.

During 2015, her collaborations included performances with John McDaniel on both sides of the Atlantic.

Since 2015, she has recorded and toured on both sides of the Atlantic with pianist Laurence Hobgood, with whom she recorded Shelter from the Storm (2016) featuring three original compositions alongside songs by Bob Dylan, Leonard Cohen, Joni Mitchell, Rodgers and Hammerstein, David Bowie, Stephen Sondheim, Bruce Springsteen, and Peter Gabriel.

In early 2016, Jungr was a featured artist in James Gavin's Lincoln Center songbook series celebrating Peggy Lee. The following year, Jungr penned a short introduction for Playerist Poetry Magazine for its themed edition on Music.

Jungr acted in British director Robina Rose's film Nightshift, playing the bar girl. For Debbie Isitt's Snarling Beastie Theatre Company she composed music for The Woman who Cooked Her Husband at the Royal Court Upstairs and Matilda Liar at the Tricycle Theatre. She appeared in Isitt's 10 by 10 for BBC Television. In 2002 the British Council supported Jungr's three-week run at the Flea Theatre in New York.

Jungr has presented, written, and researched many programmes for national BBC Radio 2, (three series of "We Stayed in with Jungr and Parker" and two Edinburgh Specials), BBC Radio 3 (For Heavy Entertainment two programmes on Persian music "Sweet Lips Dark Eyes" and two on Ethiopian music "Shaking Shoulders and Honey Beer" ), BBC Radio 2 (writer and presenter of "The Hoppings" two-hour arts special for Soundbite Productions) and BBC Radio 4 (Malawi Diary producer Paul Dodgson) and in Canada for CBC, as a regular contributor to The Global Village as well as contributing to many BBC arts programmes including Woman's Hour, Kaleidoscope, Saturday Review, Saturday Live, and A Good Read.

Jungr coached the young offenders in vocal delivery for Brian Hill's Bafta-winning film Feltham Sings. She created the voice course at London Metropolitan University and formed and ran the Raise the Roof Horseman Choir (which she founded) for several years.

In 2012, she created the song cycle "Deep Roots Tall Trees" for the Core Theatre at Corby, with local musicians, songwriters, and poets, which culminated in a concert at Corby football ground in August 2014 incorporating local musicians, the Deep Roots Tall Trees Choir, and the Royal Philharmonic Orchestra conducted by Antony Weedon. This concert started the Made in Corby Arts Council England initiative.

=== Writing ===
- Cinderella (2005), (lyricist), Jack and the Beanstalk (2006), (composer and lyricist), and Beauty and the Beast (2007), (composer and lyricist). Director (all) – Cal McCrystal, Pantomimes (Newbury Corn Exchange)
- The Ballad of Norah's Ark – songs Barb Jungr and Russell Churney, book Barb Jungr and Andy Goldberg, from original idea by Barb Jungr. In development in northeast England, previous workshops and readings in New York and London. Performed by the Billingham Players in June 2011.
- The Jungle Book (lyricist) – Birmingham Stage Company, toured again 2011/12
- The Fabulous Flutterbys (2010) – (book, composer and lyricist), Produced by the Little Angel Puppet Theatre in spring 2010.
- Liver Birds Flying Home - Liver Birds Flying Home opened at The Royal Court Liverpool in April 2018 with lyrics Barb Jungr music Mike Lindup of Level 42, and book by Barb Jungr, George Seaton and Linda McDermott. Produced by The Royal Court Liverpool and James Seabright Productions with George Seaton, directed by Benji Sperring.
- Chocolate Cake - Based on best-selling children's author Michael Rosen's poem, co-adapted by director Peter Glanville and Barb Jungr with music and songs by Barb Jungr, Chocolate Cake opened at Polka Children's Theatre in March 2018 and toured spring and summer 2018.
- How To Hide A Lion - Opened in autumn 2016 at Polka Children's Theatre then played at The Little Angel Theatre, Islington and Oxford Playhouse. Produced by Polka Theatre and Oxford Playhouse. Directed by Peter Glanville, with songs and music Barb Jungr. The show toured nationally with Pigtail Productions in autumn 2018.
- The Singing Mermaid - Based on the best-selling children's book by Julia Donaldson, opened at The Little Angel Puppet Theatre in February. Co-adapted by director Samantha Lane and Barb Jungr, it features songs and music by Barb Jungr.
- We're Going On A Bear Hunt - A musical adaptation based on the book written by Michael Rosen and illustrated by Helen Oxenbury. Music and Lyrics by Barb Jungr. Adapted by Peter Glanville and Barb Jungr.
- The Pixie and The Pudding - Co-written by Barb Jungr and Samantha Lane with Music and Songs by Barb Jungr. Presented as The Little Angel Theatre's Christmas show and ran from December 2019 to February 2020.
- The Smartest Giant in Town – Nominated for the 2023 Laurence Olivier Award for Best Family Show. Based on the picture book by Julia Donaldson and Axel Scheffler, co-adapted by Barb Jungr and Samantha Lane, with music and songs by Barb Jungr. A co-production between the Little Angel Theatre and Fierylight, it premiered at the Little Angel Theatre in May 2021 as part of the theatre's 60th anniversary season, before transferring to St Martin's Theatre in the West End. The production returns to St Martin's Theatre from 9 December 2026 to 3 January 2027.
- There May Be a Castle – Adapted from the novel by Piers Torday, co-adapted by Samantha Lane and Barb Jungr, with songs and music by Barb Jungr. Opened at the Little Angel Theatre in December 2021.
- Jack v Giant - Created by Peter Glanville and Barb Jungr, the team behind We’re Going on a Bear Hunt and How to Hide a Lion. The show had its initial run at The Polka Theatre and ran from 11 February to 26 March 2023.
- A Squash and a Squeeze – Based on Julia Donaldson and Axel Scheffler's first picture book, adapted by Barb Jungr and Samantha Lane, with music and lyrics by Barb Jungr. A Little Angel Theatre and The Lowry co-production, it opened at Little Angel Studios in February 2025 before touring.
- Pip and Posy Live on Stage – Based on the picture books by Axel Scheffler and the animated television series, written and directed by Samantha Lane, with music and lyrics by Barb Jungr. A Little Angel Theatre, Fierylight and Mayflower Southampton co-production, it had its world premiere at the Little Angel Theatre in September 2026, running until 22 November ahead of a UK tour. Musical Theatre Review credited much of the production's appeal to Jungr's tuneful and varied songs, and Everything Theatre described the music as buoyant and upbeat, giving the cast room for strong harmonies.

=== Personal life ===
She was married to musician and writer Richard "Dan" Bowling (the son of painter Frank Bowling and writer Paddy Kitchen) from 1981 to 1991.

== Discography ==
=== As leader ===
- Bouquet of Barbs (Magnet, 1985)
- Wicked (Durium, 1987)
- Off the Peg (Utility, 1989)
- Over the Bridge (Leaping Lizards, 1990)
- Hell Bent Heaven Bound (Harbourtown, 1993)
- Duruga Rising with Kuljit Bhamra and Russell Churney (KEDA, 1996)
- Bare (Irregular, 1999)
- Chanson: The Space In Between (Linn, 2000)
- Every Grain of Sand: Barb Jungr Sings Bob Dylan (Linn, 2002)
- Waterloo Sunset (Linn, 2003)
- Love Me Tender (Linn, 2005)
- Girl Talk with Claire Martin and Mari Wilson (Linn, 2005)
- Just Like a Woman (Linn, 2008)
- The Men I Love (Naim, 2009)
- Man in the Long Black Coat: Barb Jungr Sings Bob Dylan (Linn, 2011)
- Stockport to Memphis (Naim, 2012)
- Hard Rain (Kristalyn, 2014)
- Walking in the Sun (Linn, 2006)
- Those Days (Stockfisch, 2015)
- Shelter from the Storm (Linn, 2016)
- Come Together (Kristalyn, 2016)
- Float Like a Butterfly (Kristalyn, 2018)
- Bob, Brel, and Me (Kristalyn, 2019)
- In My Troubled Days - Single with The Fourth Choir (Kristalyn, 2020)
- Dancing In The Dark - Single with Simon Wallace (Kristalyn, 2020)
- Barb Jungr sings Leonard Cohen - Live at The Crazy Coqs (Kristalyn, 2022)
- My Marquee (Marquee Records, 2023)

=== As guest ===
With Michael Parker

- Wicked (1986)
- Blue Devils (1987)
- Night and Day (1988)
- Off the Peg (1988)
- Over the Bridge (1990)
- Canada (1992)

With others

- Robb Johnson, Gentle Men with Jenny Carr, Jude Abbott, and John Forrester (Irregular, 2013)
- Robb Johnson, The Triumph of Hope Over Experience (2002)
- Jonathan Cooper, The Magic of Kisses (2008)
- Peggy Seeger, Period Pieces: Women's Songs for Men and Women (1998)
- Ian Shaw, Uneasy Street (2005)
