= Wicked (Barb Jungr and Michael Parker album) =

Studio album by Barb Jungr and Michael Parker
- Released: 1986
- Studio: RMS Studios, Croydon
- Genre: Chanson
- Length: No Track Times Given
- Label: ?
- Producer: Barb Jungr, Andy Levien, Michael Parker

Barb Jungr and Michael Parker chronology
Wicked (1986)	Blue Devils (1987)

Wicked is a 1986 album by Barb Jungr and Michael Parker.

== Track listing ==
All tracks composed by Barb Jung and Michael Parker; except where noted

1. "Bad Things Come in Threes"
2. "Don't Sacrifice Me"
3. "No News is Good News" (Michael Parker)
4. "That Black Cat"
5. "In Soho Late at Night"
6. "Too Much for Me"
7. "Just the Wisky Talking"
8. "Perfect Pair"
9. "The Begging Game"
10. "Over a Low Flame"
11. "You Can't Win Them All"
12. "An Empty Bottle"

== Band members ==
Musicians

- Barb Jungr - vocals, harmonica
- Michael Parker - guitar, harmonica
- Paul Zetter - bass guitar

Other personnel

- Lin Jammet - art
- Honey Salvadori - photography
