= Midnight Choir (album) =

Studio album by Midnight Choir
- Released: 1994
- Recorded: June/July 1994
- Studio: Loma Ranch Studio, Fredericksburg, Texas
- Label: Fjording
- Producer: Andrew Hardin, Lars Ulseth (Executive producer), Tom Skjeklesæther (Executive producer)

Midnight Choir chronology
| Midnight Choir (1994) | Olsen's Lot (1996) |

Singles from Midnight Choir
- 1. "Mercy on the Street" Released: 1994; 2. "Gypsy Rider" Released: 1994; 3. "Talk to Me" Released: 1994; 4. "What Am I Worth to You?" Released: 1995

Midnight Choir is the debut album by the Norwegian band Midnight Choir, released 1994 on the Fjording label. The album was recorded and mixed at Loma Ranch Studio, Fredericksburg, Texas, during June and July 1994.

The album stayed at the Norwegian VG-lista for five weeks in 1995, peaking at No. 19. "Mercy on the Street", "Gypsy Rider", "Talk to Me" and "What Am I Worth to You?" were released as singles.

== Track listing ==
1. "Talk to Me" (Atle Byström) – 4:01
2. "Don't Turn Out the Light" (Byström/R.C. Finnigan) – 4:37
3. "Gypsy Rider" (Gene Clark) – 4:43
4. "What Am I Worth to You?" (Byström/Finnigan) – 3:59
5. "Turning of the Tide" (Richard Thompson) – 3:38
6. "Hearts Gone Wild" (Katy Moffatt/Tom Russel) – 3:22
7. "Mercy on the Street" (Byström/Finnigan) – 4:55
8. "Rock Bottom" (Byström/Ron Olsen/Finnigan) – 3:42
9. "Lonesome Drifter" (Byström/Paal Flaata/Finnigan) – 3:30
10. "Lift Me Up" (Byström) – 4:02

== Charts ==
| Chart (1995) | Peak position |
|---|---|
| VG-lista | 19 |

== Personnel ==
=== Musicians ===
- Paal Flaata - Vocal, acoustic guitar
- Atle Byström - Acoustic and electric guitar, twelve-string guitar
- Ron Olsen - Bass guitar, double bass
- Tore Wildhauer - Drums, percussion
- Andrew Hardin - Electric and acoustic guitar, backing vocal, strings, castanets
- Richard Dee Purkeypile - Hammond organ on track #1
- Allison Young - Backing vocal
- Mike Hardwick - Acoustic guitar on track #3
- Leigh Harris - Backing vocal on track #4 and #10
- Paul Pearcy - Conga on track #4, percussion on track #5 and #10
- John Mills - Tenor saxophone on track #4 and #10
- Kent Winking - Trombone on track #4 and #10
- Keith Winking - Trumpet on track #4 and #10
- Brian Wood - Acoustic guitar on track #6
- Denice Franke - Backing vocal on track #6
- Mickey Merkens - Backing vocal on track #6

=== Production ===
- Andrew Hardin – Producer
- Lars Ulseth – Executive producer
- Tom Skjeklesæther – Executive producer
- John Hill – Mixer, recording
- Jerry Tubb – Mastering
- John Mills – Horn arrangements
- Raymond Mosken – Photo
- Bulldog design – Design
