= Murder Most Fab =

2007 novel by Julian Clary

- First edition (publ. Ebury Press)
- Author: Julian Clary
- Publisher: Ebury, 2007
- Pages: 345
- ISBN: 0091914493

Murder Most Fab (2007) is the debut novel of comedian Julian Clary.

== Synopsis ==
Still haunted by memories of his mentally ill mother and a doomed romance with a man called Timothy, rent boy Johnny Debonair moves on in the world when he breaks into the entertainment industry, eventually becoming 'Mr. Friday Night'. However, his path to fame is littered with corpses.

Told in the style of a final confession, the story follows Debonair as he finds himself drawn towards serial murder so he can maintain his hold on the spotlight.

Reviewed by Penguin Australia as "A darkly hilarious debut novel from one of Britain's best-loved entertainers" the tale is told through the protagonist's interactions with his mother, an eccentric country girl his best friend and business partner and a past lover.
