= Man in the Long Black Coat: Barb Jungr Sings Bob Dylan =

Bob Dylan 2011 tribute album by Barb Jungr

Studio album by Barb Jungr
- Released: 2011
- Label: Linn Records

Barb Jungr chronology
The Men I Love (2009)	Man in the Long Black Coat: Barb Jungr Sings Bob Dylan (2011)	Stockport to Memphis (2012)

Man in the Long Black Coat is a tribute album to Bob Dylan recorded by Barb Jungr. The album is named after a Dylan song of the same name.

== Track listing ==
All tracks composed by Bob Dylan

1. "Man in the Long Black Coat" – 4:17
2. "The Times They Are a-Changin'" – 3:14
3. "It Ain't Me Babe" – 4:04
4. "Just Like a Woman" – 5:32
5. "Like a Rolling Stone" – 6:00
6. "Trouble in Mind" – 4:32
7. "Tomorrow Is a Long Time" – 5:58
8. "High Water (For Charlie Patton)" – 5:47
9. "Sara" – 5:02
10. "Ballad of Hollis Brown" – 4:53
11. "Blind Willie McTell" – 4:14
12. "With God On Our Side" – 4:04
13. "I Shall Be Released" – 5:33

== Personnel ==
=== Musicians ===
- Barb Jungr - vocals, tambourine
- Geoff Gascoyne - bass (tracks 5, 8)
- Nic France - drums (tracks 5, 8)
- Matt Backer - guitars (tracks 5, 8)
- Adrian York - piano (tracks 5, 8)
- Jonathan Cooper - clarinets, piano, keyboard samples, soundscape (tracks 7, 13)
- Miriam Teppich - violin (tracks 7, 13)
- Dominika Rosiek - violin (tracks 7, 13)
- Rebecca Brown- viola (tracks 7, 13)
- Thangam Debbonaire - cello (tracks 7, 13)
- Billy Jackson - harp (tracks 7, 13)
- Mario Castronari - acoustic bass (tracks 7, 13)
- Jenny Carr - piano, musical director, backing vocals, percussion] (tracks 1–4, 6, 9–12)
- Jessica Lauren - harmonicas, organ, bass piano, backing vocals, mbira, autoharp, mellotron, electronic tanpura (tracks 2, 4, 6, 10–11)
- Steve Watts - bass (tracks 6, 11)
- Roy Dodds - drums, percussion (tracks 6, 11)
- Gabriella Swallow - cello (tracks 6, 11)
- Eric Bibb - guitars (tracks 6, 11)
- Johnny Lee - percussion, drums, clock sample (tracks 2, 4, 10)
- Danny Thompson - bass (tracks 2, 4, 10)
- Mark Lockheart - saxophones, clarinets (tracks 2, 4, 10)

=== Other personnel ===
- Calum Malcolm - engineer
- John Haxby - design
- Steve Ullathorne - photography
- Habie Schwarz - photography

== See also ==
- List of songs written by Bob Dylan
- List of artists who have covered Bob Dylan songs
