= Every Grain of Sand: Barb Jungr Sings Bob Dylan =

Studio album by Barb Jungr
- Released: March 2002
- Recorded: 7–9 October 2001
- Studios: Mark Angel Studios, London
- Genre: European cabaret
- Length: 63:17
- Label: Linn Records
- Producer: Calum Malcolm

Barb Jungr chronology
Chanson: The Space in Between (2000)	Every Grain of Sand: Barb Jungr Sings Bob Dylan (2002)	Waterloo Sunset (2003)

Professional ratings
Review scores
Source	Rating
Allmusic	(4.5/5)
Record Collector	3/5 stars

Every Grain of Sand is a tribute album to Bob Dylan recorded by Barb Jungr. The album is named after a Dylan song of the same name.

== Track listing ==
1. "I'll Be Your Baby Tonight" (Bob Dylan) – 4:06
  Originally from the Bob Dylan album John Wesley Harding (1967)
2. "If Not For You" (Dylan) – 3:09
  Originally from the Bob Dylan album New Morning (1970)
3. "Things Have Changed" (Dylan) – 4:57
  Originally from the soundtrack to the film Wonder Boys (dir Curtis Hanson) (2000), and from the Bob Dylan album The Essential Bob Dylan (2000)
4. "Ring Them Bells" (Dylan) – 3:14
  Originally from the Bob Dylan album Oh Mercy (1989)
5. "Not Dark Yet" (Dylan) – 4:36
  Originally from the Bob Dylan album Time Out of Mind (1997)
6. "Don't Think Twice, It's All Right" (Dylan) – 4:37
  Originally from the Bob Dylan album The Freewheelin' Bob Dylan (1963)
7. "Is Your Love in Vain?" (Dylan) – 3:29
  Originally from the Bob Dylan album Street Legal (1978)
8. "It's All Over Now, Baby Blue" (Dylan) – 4:10
  Originally from the Bob Dylan album Bringing It All Back Home (1965)
9. "I Want You" (Dylan) – 3:13
  Originally from the Bob Dylan album Blonde on Blonde (1966)
10. "Sugar Baby" (Dylan) – 7:40
  Originally from the Bob Dylan album Love and Theft (2001)
11. "Born in Time" (Dylan) – 3:10
  Originally from the Bob Dylan album Under the Red Sky (1990)
12. "What Good Am I?" (Dylan) – 3:58
  Originally from the Bob Dylan album Oh Mercy (1989)
13. "Tangled Up in Blue" (Dylan) – 5:33
  Originally from the Bob Dylan album Blood on the Tracks (1975)
14. "Forever Young" (Dylan) – 2:57
  Originally from the Bob Dylan album Planet Waves (1974)
15. "Every Grain of Sand" (Dylan) – 4:22
  Originally from the Bob Dylan album Shot of Love (1981)

== Personnel ==
=== Musicians ===
- Barb Jungr - vocals, harmonica
- Simon Wallace - piano (tracks 1–3, 5–8, 10–12, 14–15)
- Russell Churney - piano (tracks 4, 9, 13)
- Mark Lockheart - saxophone
- Kim Burton - accordion
- Sonya Fairbairn - violin
- Sonia Oakes Stuart - (Sonia Hammond) cello
- Julie Walkington - double bass
- Gary Hammond - percussion

=== Other personnel ===
- Calum Malcolm - engineer
- Kevan Gallagher - engineer
- John Haxby - design
- Garry Laybourn - photography
- Eric Thorburn - photography
- Brodie - make-up
- Howard Thompson - artists and repertoire

== See also ==
- List of songs written by Bob Dylan
- List of artists who have covered Bob Dylan songs
