= Robyn Sings =

2002 album of Bob Dylan covers by Robyn Hitchcock

Live album by Robyn Hitchcock
- Released: 2002
- Recorded: Disc one - USA, 1999-2000; Disc two - London, 1996
- Genre: Folk
- Label: Editions PAF

Robyn Hitchcock chronology
| A Star for Bram (2000) | Robyn Sings (2002) | Luxor (2003) |

Professional ratings
Review scores
| Source | Rating |
|---|---|
| Allmusic | 3/5 stars |

Robyn Sings is a double album by Robyn Hitchcock, released in 2002. The set is made up entirely of Bob Dylan covers, performed live at various dates.

The CD was the second release on Hitchcock's own Editions PAF! label.

== Background ==
Hitchcock is a long-time Dylan fan, and this is the first time he had released an album of covers, giving Dylan an especially privileged place in Hitchcock's oeuvre.

== Disc details ==
Rather than nominate the two discs as 'one' and 'two', they are labeled 'stripes' and 'dots' respectively, in view of the printed pattern on each.

Disc Stripes contains eight recordings including two versions of "Visions of Johanna", which Hitchcock introduces as "the reason I started writing songs". His source material here is varied, spanning several decades of Dylan output from the mid-1960s up until 1997's "Not Dark Yet". Hitchcock's renditions are sensitive and sharp, with the occasional lyric change. (During the track "4th Time Around", Hitchcock forgets his words and has to request help from the audience.)

Disc Dots is a re-creation of the second part of Bob Dylan's 'Royal Albert Hall' concert of 1966, which actually took place in Manchester, and is famous for Dylan's confrontational stance against a heckling audience who objected to his electric instrumentation. Hitchcock runs through the set track for track, culminating with "Like a Rolling Stone".

== Illustration ==
The CD insert features a shot of Hitchcock on the Isle of Wight, at a 1996 gig for which he chartered two vintage open-topped buses, transporting his audience around certain beauty spots on the island, where the entourage would pull over and listen to a few numbers before boarding again and heading off.

== Track listing ==
All tracks composed by Bob Dylan

=== Disc Stripes ===
1. "Visions of Johanna"
2. "Tangled Up in Blue"
3. "Not Dark Yet"
4. "4th Time Around"
5. "Desolation Row"
6. "It's All Over Now, Baby Blue"
7. "Dignity"
8. "Visions of Johanna"

=== Disc Dots ===
1. "Tell Me Mama"
2. "I Don't Believe You"
3. "Baby Let Me Follow You Down"
4. "Just Like Tom Thumb's Blues"
5. "Leopard-Skin Pillbox Hat"
6. "One Too Many Mornings"
7. "Ballad of a Thin Man"
8. "Like a Rolling Stone"

== Personnel ==
- Robyn Hitchcock - vocals, guitar, bass, harmonica
- Grant-Lee Phillips - guitar, bass, background vocals
- Jon Brion - guitar
- Richmond Chutney - drums
- Bill Bonk - piano, harmonica

=== Disc Dots personnel ===
- Jake Kyle - Musician Mr. Danko
- Robyn Hitchcock - Musician Mr. Dylan
- Patrick Hannan - Musician Mr. Jones
- Tim Keegan - Musician Mr. Manuel
- Andrew Claridge - Musician Mr. Robertson

== See also ==
- List of songs written by Bob Dylan
- List of artists who have covered Bob Dylan songs
