= Cimarron Manifesto =

Studio album by Jimmy LaFave
- Released: May 8, 2007
- Recorded: Austin, Texas
- Genres: country, folk, singer-songwriter
- Label: Red House
- Producer: Jimmy LaFave

Jimmy LaFave chronology
Blue Nightfall (2005)	Cimarron Manifesto (2007)

Professional ratings
Review scores
Source	Rating
Allmusic	4/5 stars
Austin Chronicle	3/5 stars
Folkwax	(8/10)
PopMatters	(6/10)

Cimarron Manifesto is a 2007 album by red dirt singer-songwriter Jimmy LaFave. It is his second release for Red House Records. The album has been critically well received and has appeared at or near the top of many folk/Americana oriented music charts.

== Track listing ==
1. "Car Outside" (LaFave) – 4:28
2. "Catch the Wind" (Donovan) – 5:23
3. "This Land" (LaFave) – 4:47
4. "Truth" (LaFave) – 2:59
5. "Lucky Man" (LaFave) – 5:50
6. "Hideaway Girl" (LaFave) – 4:22
7. "That's the Way It Goes" (LaFave) – 3:17
8. "Not Dark Yet" (Bob Dylan) – 6:51
9. "Walk a Mile in My Shoes" (Joe South) – 4:55
10. "Don't Ask Me" (LaFave) – 3:11
11. "Home Once Again" (LaFave) – 6:18
12. "These Blues" (LaFave) – 3:40

== Credits ==
=== Musicians ===
- Jimmy LaFave – acoustic and Electric guitar, mando-guitar, acoustic baritone guitar, National resophonic guitar
- John Inmon – electric guitar, Lap steel
- Andrew Hardin – electric guitar
- Radoslav Lorković – Hammond B3 organ, piano
- Bryan Peterson – piano, electric piano
- Wally Doggett – drums
- Jeff May – bass
- Glenn Schuetz – Upright bass
- Jeff Plankenhorn – Dobro, Lap steel
- Carrie Rodriguez – violin, harmony vocals on "This Land" and "Hideaway Girl"
- Ruthie Foster harmony vocals on "Walk a Mile in My Shoes"
- Kacy Crowley – harmony vocals on "Car Outstide"

=== Production ===
- Produced by Jimmy LaFave
- Engineered by Fred Remmert
- Recorded at Cedar Creek Studios, Austin, Texas

=== Artwork ===
- Art Direction/Design by Bryan Peterson
- Photography by Pete Lacker

== Charts ==
date	chart	peak
June 11, 2007	Americana Music Association	1
2007	Roots Music Folk	1
2007	Third Coast Music	1
2007	Euro American Chart	1
May & June 2007	FolkDJ-L, Folk Radio Airplay	3

== Releases ==
year	format	label	catalog #
2007	CD	Red House	RHR CD 203
