= Des de Moor =

English writer and musician (1961–2026)

Des de Moor (20 April 1961 – 7 February 2026) was an English writer, singer, musician and songwriter. In 1987, he formed The Irresistible Force with Morris Gould also known as Mixmaster Morris.

One of de Moor's best known works was Darkness and Disgrace: Des de Moor and Russell Churney Perform the Songs of David Bowie, an adaptation of David Bowie songs in cabaret/chanson style created in collaboration with pianist Russell Churney, originally performed in 2001 and recorded in 2003.

De Moor also produced English translations of songs by Jacques Brel.

He was a long-time member of the British Guild of Beer Writers, writing regularly for Campaign for Real Ale publications and others. In 2010, he contributed to the book 1001 Beers You Must Try Before You Die (edited by Adrian Tierney-Jones, Quintessence) and in 2011 published his own first book, The CAMRA Guide to London's Best Beer, Pubs and Bars (CAMRA Books). A second edition of this appeared in 2015 and a third in 2022. De Moor also wrote Cask: The Real Story of Britain's Unique Beer Culture, published by CAMRA Books in 2023.

De Moor died from a brain tumour on 7 February 2026, at the age of 64.

== Discography ==
=== Solo albums ===
- Water of Europe (1999)

=== Other albums ===
- Des de Moor and Russell Churney – Darkness and Disgrace: Des de Moor and Russell Churney Perform the Songs of David Bowie (2003)
