= Russell Churney =

English composer, pianist, arranger and musical director

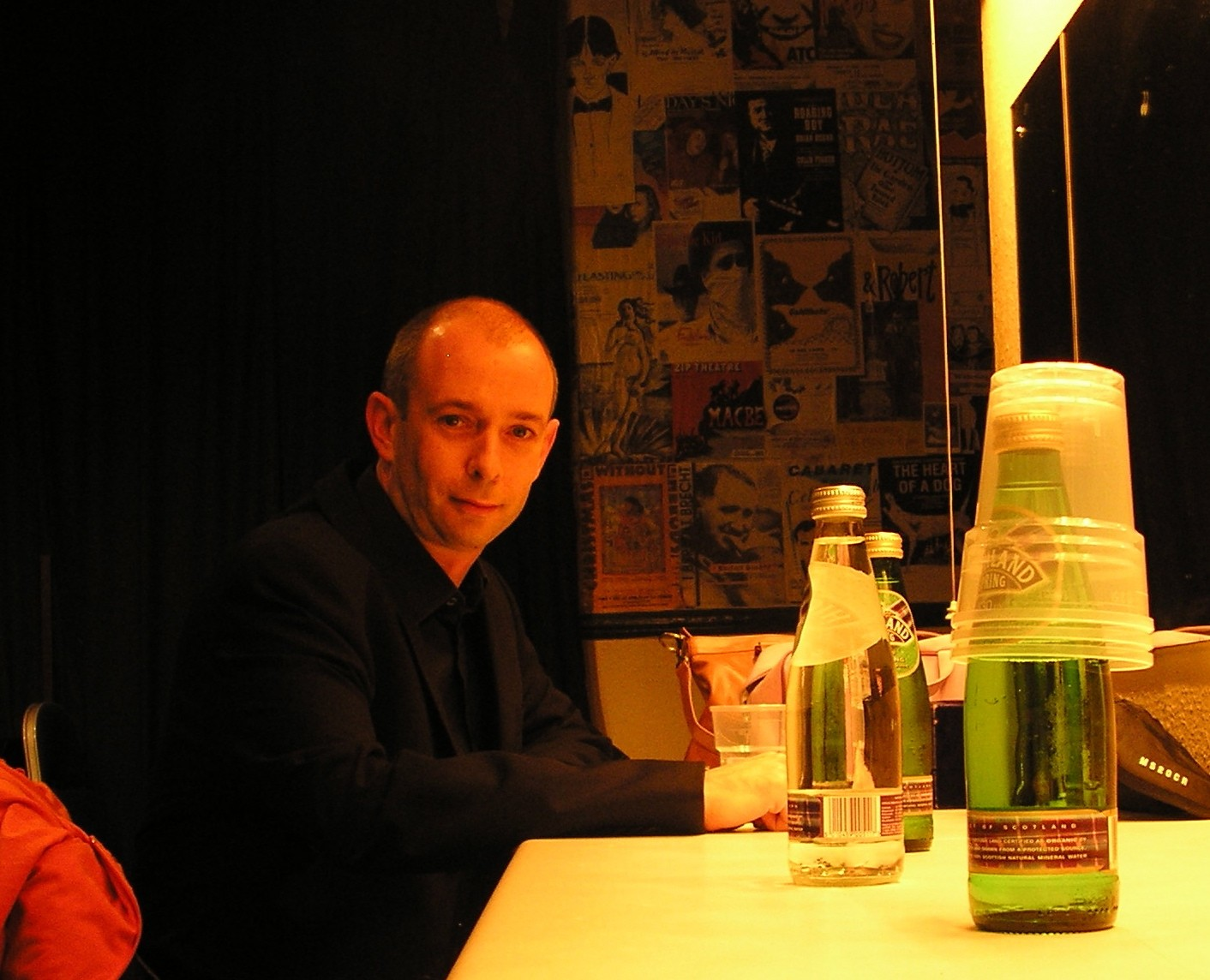
Russell Churney. Hemel Hempstead Old Town Hall Arts Centre, October 2005.

Russell Churney (10 September 1964 – 27 February 2007) was an English composer, pianist, arranger and musical director, and a member of the comedy/cabaret group, Fascinating Aïda. Ooberman keyboardist and vocalist Sophia Churney is his sister.

== Biography ==
Born as Lindsay Russell Churney in Liverpool, Churney was educated at Merchant Taylors' School in Great Crosby and Trinity College, Cambridge. He studied Law.

He spent seven years working with the comedian Julian Clary, touring extensively with Clary and singer Barb Jungr, and appearing with Jungr on Clary's Channel 4 TV series Sticky Moments with Julian Clary. Together with Jungr, he devised and performed in shows including Bare, Killing Me Softly, Songs From The Heart, Chanson: The Space in Between, Barb, Bob and Brel, and the musical The Ballad of Norah's Ark.

He recorded the album Durga Rising (1997) with Jungr and percussionist Kuljit Bhamra, and he performs on Jungr's albums Bare (1999), Chanson: The Space in Between (2000), and Every Grain of Sand: Barb Jungr Sings Bob Dylan (2002).

With Des de Moor (like Jungr, a chansonnier, or singer of chansons), he devised and performed in Darkness and Disgrace: Travels with a Wild-Eyed Alien from Bromley, a show directed by Jungr and based around songs by David Bowie. Churney and de Moor also recorded an accompanying album Darkness and Disgrace: Des de Moor and Russell Churney Perform the Songs of David Bowie (2003), featuring Jungr.

Other musical shows on which Churney worked as musical director and pianist include Portraits in Song (with Elizabeth Mansfield), The Lonely Fate of the Femme Fatale (with Sandra Lawrence), Back With You (with Dillie Keane), Cabaret Whores (with Howard Samuels), Straker Sings Brel (with Peter Straker), and Big Night Out at the Little Palace Theatre (with Sandi Toksvig and Dillie Keane).

He also recorded the albums One Last Flutter with Fascinating Aida and Back With You with Dillie Keane. He composed original scores for films including One Minute Past Midnight (directed by Celia Galan Julve, 2004) and the Channel 4 documentaries Return Trip (dir Carol Morley) and The Alcohol Years (directed by Carol Morley, 2000).

Performers in The Lovely Russell rehearsing (top) and performing (bottom).

Churney died of pancreatic cancer, aged 42. A memorial concert, The Lovely Russell, was held in his honour on 29 June 2008, with performances by his friends or associates Barb Jungr, Sandi Toksvig, Fascinating Aïda, Julian Clary and many others. Sylvester McCoy donated one of his prop hats from his character in Doctor Who. The proceeds of the concert went to Russell's favourite charities.
