= Jimmy LaFave =

American singer-songwriter (1955–2017)

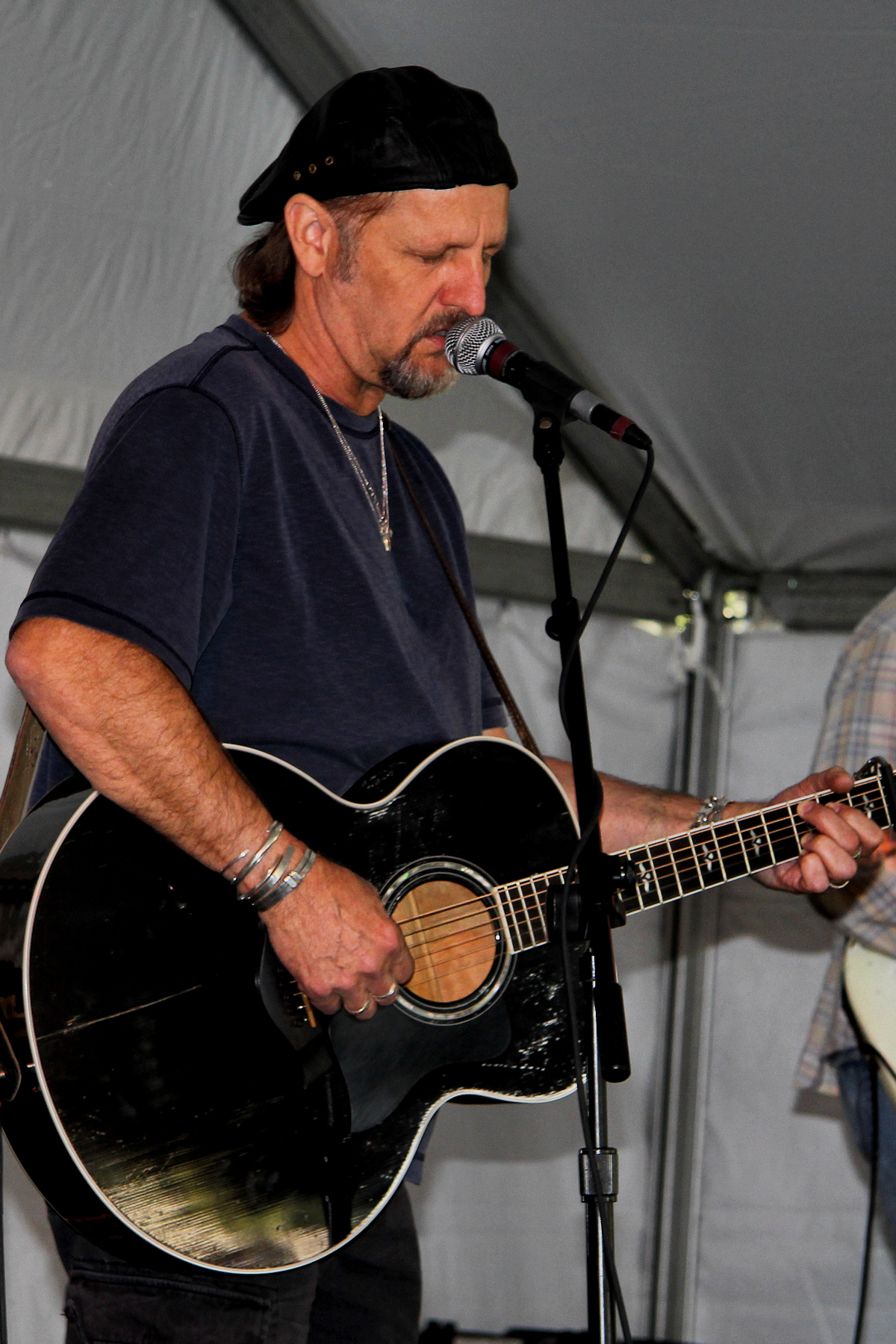
- LaFave performing at the 2012 Texas Book Festival.

Background information
- Born: July 12, 1955; Wills Point, Texas, U.S.
- Died: May 21, 2017 (aged 61) Austin, Texas, U.S.
- Genres: Folk, alt country, country rock
- Occupation: Singer-songwriter
- Years active: 1979–2017
- Label: Music Road Records
- Website: www.jimmylafave.com

Jimmy LaFave (July 12, 1955 – May 21, 2017) was an American singer-songwriter and folk musician. After moving to Stillwater, Oklahoma, LaFave became a supporter of Woody Guthrie. He later became an Advisory Board member and regular performer at the annual Woody Guthrie Folk Festival.

In 1996 LaFave received the Kerrville Folk Festival songwriter of the year award and appeared on the TV show Austin City Limits. He recorded 15 albums and his 2007 release, Cimarron Manifesto, reached the No. 1 mark on the Americana Music Association album chart. In 2012, LaFave released the studio album Depending on the Distance.

LaFave was inducted into the Oklahoma Music Hall of Fame in 2017 alongside Carl Belew, musician-actor Rodney Lay, the Red Dirt Rangers, David Teegarden, Sr. and singer-harmonica player Junior Markham.

== Early life ==
While living in Wills Point, Texas, LaFave began playing the drums and later moved to Stillwater, Oklahoma and played in the school band. At age 15 LaFave switched to guitar and began writing and singing his own songs in a band called The Night Tribe.

== Career ==
After graduating from high school LaFave played music at night while working during the day. He had a job as the manager of a music club called Up Your Alley and during this period recorded the albums Down Under in 1979 and Broken Line in 1981. Later, in 1988, LaFave self-released a cassette only album "Highway Angels... Full Moon Rain", which featured his photography as the cover artwork.

=== Red Dirt Music scene ===
While living in Stillwater, LaFave and a loose collection of songwriters at a local venue known as "the farm" began developing a sound that would later become known as "red dirt music". During that time, LaFave met Bob Childers and produced his first record. Mixing blues, jazz, and country influences he began writing songs inspired by J. J. Cale, Chet Baker, Bob Dylan and Leon Russell. Sometime after Childers' death in 2008, a one-day singer-songwriter festival called Bob Childers' Gypsy Café became an annual event in Stillwater. The festival is a fundraiser for the non-profit Red Dirt Relief Fund. On April 26, 2017, during the festival, LaFave was the inaugural recipient of the Restless Spirit Award – an award whose name comes from a Childers' song.

=== 1992 to 2004 ===
After traveling to several other cities, LaFave relocated to Austin, Texas.

In 1992 La Fave signed with Colorado-based Bohemia Beat Records and recorded his debut album, Austin Skyline, which included four Bob Dylan songs and consisted of live performances and recordings from four Austin, Texas live music venues including La Zona Rosa and Chicago House. That 4th album was followed by Highway Trance in 1994 and Buffalo Return to the Plains in 1995. Between 1997 and 2001, LaFave released three more albums on the label including the 1999 double CD Trail, which was a 15-year retrospective of live performances and studio outtakes. In December 1995, LaFave won the Songwriter of the Year Award at the Kerrville Folk Festival and in March 1996 received the same honor at the Austin Music Awards sponsored by The Austin Chronicle. LaFave gained nationwide exposure in 1996 through his appearance on the PBS music show Austin City Limits when he was paired with Lisa Loeb for an evening of "acoustic ballads and electrified folk-rock numbers". In 1996, LaFave made an appearance at a tribute to Woody Guthrie held at the Rock and Roll Hall of Fame at the invitation of Guthrie's daughter.

In 1998, LaFave began attending the annual Woody Guthrie Folk Festivals held in Guthrie's hometown of Okemah, Oklahoma and in 2007 became a member of the Woody Guthrie Coalition that organizes the festival. LaFave says Woody Guthrie is his musical hero and pays homage to him in the song "Woody Guthrie" on the Texoma album. Album reviewers described it as "reminiscent of the Dust Bowl heritage of Woody Guthrie, the early rock of Chuck Berry, the quiet folk reflections of Bob Dylan, and the rock anthems of Bruce Springsteen" and "honest, thoughtful and sincere" music. LaFave's "red dirt music" sound has been described as a mix of rock, folk, rockabilly, and country, grounded in the landscape of Texas and Oklahoma and can be heard on this album.

=== 2005 to 2015 ===
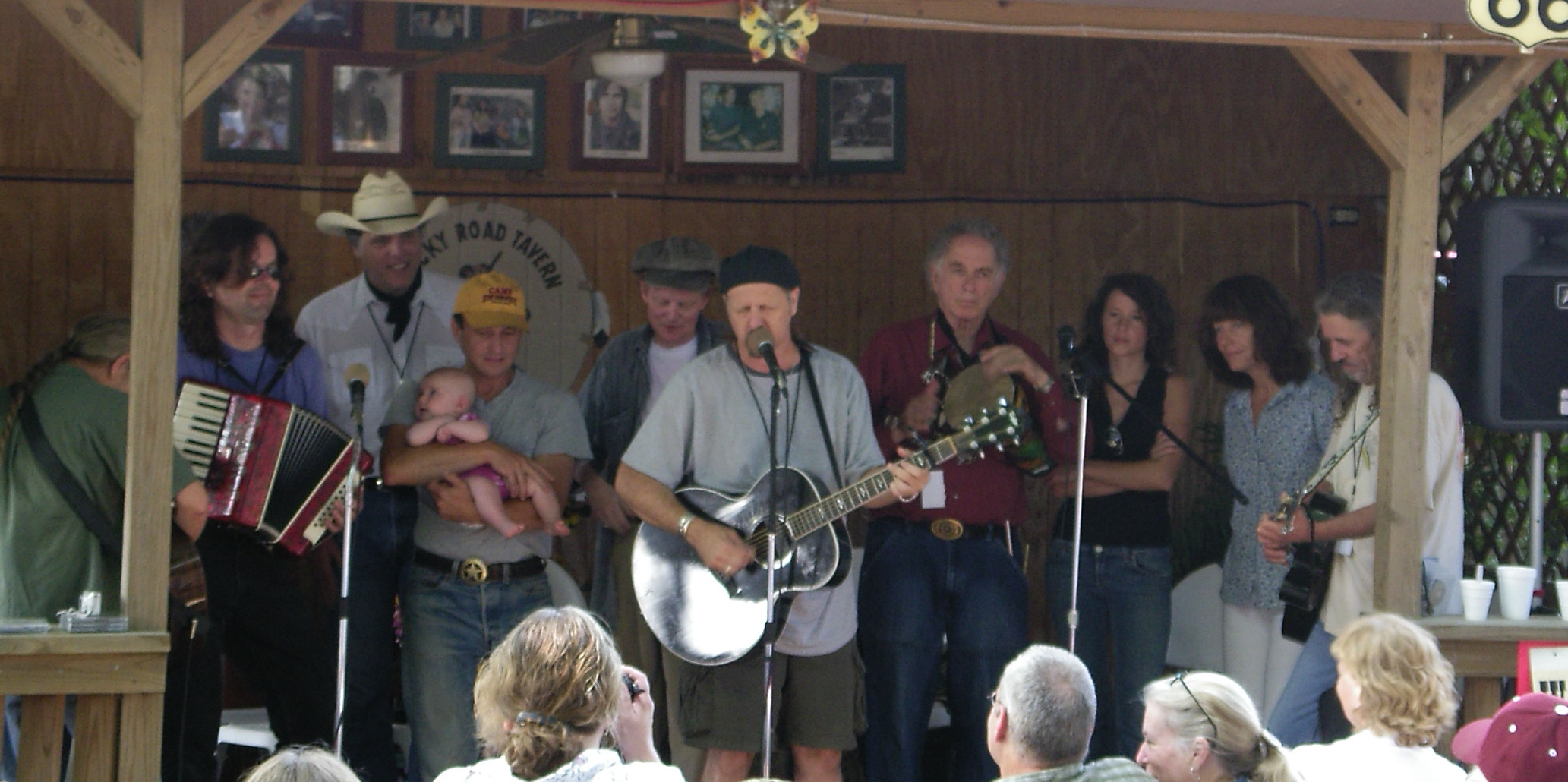
Jimmy LaFave and friends at the Woody Guthrie Folk Festival in Okemah, Oklahoma, July 2005

In 2003, LaFave produced a Woody Guthrie tribute show called Ribbon of Highway, Endless Skyway. The ensemble show toured around the country and included a rotating cast of singer-songwriters individually performing Guthrie's songs. Interspersed between songs were Guthrie's philosophical writings read by a narrator. In addition to LaFave, members of the rotating cast included Ellis Paul, Slaid Cleaves, Eliza Gilkyson, Joel Rafael, husband-wife duo Sarah Lee Guthrie (Woody Guthrie's granddaughter) and Johnny Irion, Michael Fracasso, and The Burns Sisters. The Godfather of Red Dirt Music Bob Childers, also known as "the Dylan of the Dust," served as narrator. When word spread about the tour, performers began contacting LaFave, whose only prerequisite was to have an inspirational connection to Guthrie. Each artist chose the Guthrie songs that he or she would perform as part of the tribute. One of the songs Gilkyson chose was "Pastures of Plenty", while Cleaves chose "This Morning I Am Born Again" – a song he wrote using Guthrie's lyrics. One of the songs Paul chose was a song he wrote using Guthrie's lyrics – "God's Promise". LaFave said, "It works because all the performers are Guthrie enthusiasts in some form". The Ribbon of Highway tour kicked off on February 5, 2003, at the Ryman Auditorium in Nashville. The abbreviated show was a featured segment of "Nashville Sings Woody," yet another tribute concert to commemorate the music of Woody Guthrie held during the Folk Alliance Conference. The cast of "Nashville Sings Woody," a benefit for the Woody Guthrie Foundation and Archives, also included Arlo Guthrie, Marty Stuart, Nanci Griffith, Guy Clark, Ramblin' Jack Elliott, Janis Ian, and others. Also in 2007 at Nora Guthrie's invitation, LaFave spoke and performed at Woody Guthrie's induction into the Oklahoma Hall of Fame.

LaFave left Bohemia Beat for Red House Records and released his 2005 album Blue Nightfall which one reviewer called his "best work yet" and "a great introduction to an important artist". LaFave's second release for Red House Records was the 2007 album Cimarron Manifesto which went to No. 1 on the Americana Music Association chart. In his review of LaFave's Cimarron Manifesto (2007) for the FolkWax E-Zine, Arthur Wood calls LaFave "one of the finest Dylan interpreters ever. In the same period he collaborated with Zucchero Fornaciari, who covered LaFave's "Never Is A Moment" on his album La Sesión Cubana. Two years later LaFave was one of the guests of the Americana Tour with the Italian bluesman.

LaFave's 14th release, Depending on the Distance, was released on September 18, 2012. Backing musicians include Austin's Eliza Gilkyson and John Inmon. The 13-track release includes three Dylan covers, including a version of "Red River Shore" that runs more than nine minutes. In her review for The Oklahoman, Brandy McDonnell said: "Jimmy LaFave’s first studio album in five years, lives up to the intriguing promise of its title, finding the Oklahoma-Texas troubadour in a contemplative mood whether he is crooning his new original songs, covering an ’80s pop smash or reinterpreting anthems penned by Rock and Roll Hall of Famers Bob Dylan and Bruce Springsteen."

In 2015, LaFave released The Night Tribe. A review of the release in No Depression stated that LaFave "delivers 11 exquisitely crafted self-penned songs and re-interprets two Americana masterpieces; barely making them recognizable as they become Jimmy LaFave songs."

== Music Road records ==
In 2007, LaFave joined forces with recording engineer Fred Remmert and Dallas businessman Kelcy Warren to create Music Road Records, located in Austin, Texas. Music Road Records owns and operates two Texas-based recording facilities: Cedar Creek Recording in Austin and Cherokee Creek Recording in the Texas Hill Country. Favorites 1992–2001, a retrospective from LaFave's years on the Bohemia Beat label, was released by Music Road Records in 2010.

In April 2014, Music Road records released Looking into You: A Tribute to Jackson Browne. The 2-disc tribute album was produced by LaFave and was two years in the making, after LaFave garnered Browne's approval during the 2012 Woody Guthrie Centennial Celebration. The album features Bruce Springsteen, Lyle Lovett, Bonnie Raitt, Ben Harper, Keb Mo', Shawn Colvin, Lucinda Williams, and others.

== Illness and death ==
In an article published in The Austin Chronicle in April 2017, LaFave announced publicly that he was battling myxofibrosarcoma, a rare form of cancer that had been diagnosed one year earlier. After various treatments failed, doctors advised LaFave that there was nothing else the medical profession could provide. During the course of his illness leading up to this announcement, LaFave continued to perform – not cancelling even one show. In addition, he continued to record new songs that he hoped would add to his legacy.

At the time of the public announcement, The Austin Statesman announced that a concert to honor LaFave would be held at the Paramount Theater in Austin, Texas on May 18, 2017. LaFave helped in the selection of friends and musicians who would perform that night. LaFave also selected charities that would benefit from a crowdfunding effort set up in his honor. A crowdfunding effort "Celebrating Jimmy LaFave" was set up via GoFundMe and received about $55,000 in donations.

LaFave died of cancer at his home in Austin, Texas, at the age of 61. His death came just three days after making an appearance at the Paramount Theater tribute show in Austin. According to The Austin Statesman: "A sold-out audience heard artists ranging from Austin artists including Eliza Gilkyson, Slaid Cleaves and Ruthie Foster, plus some from out-of-state including Nashville’s Gretchen Peters, Boston’s Ellis Paul and Woody Guthrie’s granddaughter Sarah Lee Guthrie, primarily playing songs that LaFave wrote or were part of his repertoire."

Within 24 hours, LaFave's death was reported in numerous newspapers throughout Texas and Oklahoma, in The New York Times and as far away as England and The Netherlands, where he often performed. LaFave is survived by his son Jackson LaFave of Austin, siblings Garry LaFave of Cashion, OK, Robert LaFave of Edmond, OK, Connie LaFave Casner of Sulphur, OK, and longtime friend and companion Ashley Warren of Austin, TX.

== Awards ==
Year	Association/Award	Category
2017	Oklahoma Music Hall of Fame	Inductee
2017	Austin Musician Of The Year	Inductee
2017	Restless Spirit Award	Inaugural Recipient
1997	Austin Music Award	Singer-Songwriter of the Year
1996	Austin Music Award	Singer-Songwriter of the Year
1996	Kerrville Folk Festival	Songwriter of the Year

== Select discography ==
Year	Title	Record label
1979	Down Under	Snowbound
1981	Broken Line	Snowbound
1988	Highway Angels...Full Moon Rain	Independent
1992	Austin Skyline	Bohemia Beat
1994	Highway Trance	Bohemia Beat
1994	The Open Road (Highway Trance)	Munich Records EP
1995	Buffalo Return to the Plains	Bohemia Beat
1995	Burden To Bear	Munich Records EP
1997	Road Novel	Bohemia Beat
1999	Trail	Bohemia Beat
2001	Texoma	Bohemia Beat
2005	Blue Nightfall	Red House Records
2007	Cimarron Manifesto	Red House Records
2010	Favorites 1992–2001	Music Road Records
2012	Depending on the Distance	Music Road Records
2014	Trail 2	Music Road Records
2014	Trail 3	Music Road Records
2015	The Night Tribe	Music Road Records
2015	Trail 4	Music Road Records
2016	Trail 5	Music Road Records
2018	Peace Town	Music Road Records
2020	Highway Angels...Full Moon Rain (Reissue)	Night Tribe Music
