= Julian Clary =

English actor, comedian, novelist and presenter (born 1959)

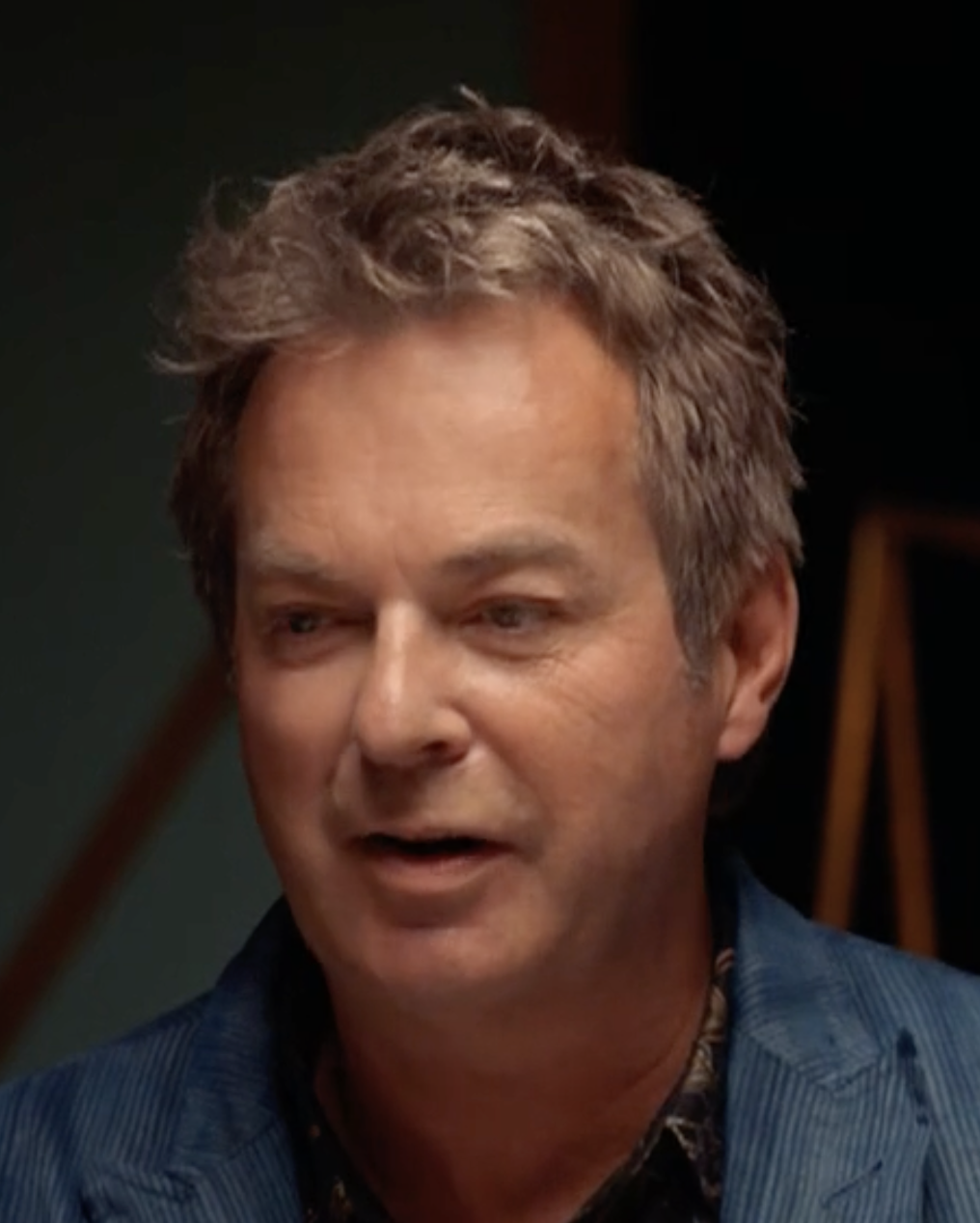
- Clary in 2019
- Born: Julian Peter McDonald Clary; 25 May 1959 (age 67); Surbiton, England
- Education: Goldsmiths, University of London
- Notable work: Sticky Moments; Murder Most Fab; Terry & Julian; All Rise for Julian Clary
- Spouse: Ian Mackley (m. 2016)

Comedy career
- Years active: 1981–present
- Medium: Books, radio, stand-up comedy, television
- Genres: Alternative comedy, camp, innuendo
- Website: julianclary.co.uk

Julian Peter McDonald Clary (born 25 May 1959) is an English comedian, actor, novelist and presenter. He began appearing on television in the mid-1980s. Since then, he has also acted in films, on television and in stage productions, including numerous pantomimes. He was the winner of Celebrity Big Brother 10 in 2012.

== Early life and education ==
Clary was born on 25 May 1959 in Surbiton, Surrey, to Brenda (née McDonald) Clary, a probation officer, and Peter J. Clary, a police officer. He was brought up in Teddington, Middlesex, with two older sisters. By his own account, he was conceived "in broad daylight" in Clacton-on-Sea in 1958. Two of his great-grandparents were Germans who had immigrated to Britain at the end of the nineteenth century. He and his siblings were raised as Roman Catholics. He attended St Benedict's School, Ealing, and, later, he studied English and Drama at Goldsmiths' College, University of London.

== Stand-up comedy ==
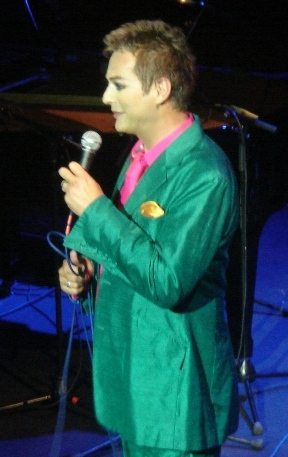
Clary in 2008

Clary is gay, and his sexuality forms the basis for much of his comedy. He refers to himself as a "renowned homosexual" and is known for his outrageous and flamboyant costumes and make-up and interactions with his audience such as looking in their bags, commenting on their attire and flirting with straight men in the audience. For those who get too close he is quick to respond "Don't touch me". He has been assisted by Hugh Jelly and others in audience participation segments.

Clary began his career under the name Leo Hurll, a fake keyboardist for pop band Thinkman (a recording project conceived by Rupert Hine). He entered the alternative comedy scene in the early 1980s, firstly under the alias Gillian Pieface and later as The Joan Collins Fan Club. He wore heavy glam make-up and dressed in outrageous clothes, often involving leather/PVC and hinting at bondage. His pet dog, Fanny the Wonderdog, a whippet mongrel, also featured in performances.

Since then Clary has undertaken several tours of his stage act, some of which have been released on home video, including:

- The Mincing Machine Tour (1989)
- My Glittering Passage (1993)
- Natural Born Mincer (2003)
- Lord of the Mince (2009–10)
- Position Vacant: Apply Within (2012–13)
- The Joy of Mincing (2016)
- Born to Mince (2019)

He was named Ambassador for the 2016 Adelaide Fringe, responsible for promoting the festival internationally.

== Television ==
After a number of appearances on Friday Night Live in the mid- to late 1980s, Clary co-hosted the short-lived ITV game show Trick or Treat in 1989 with Mike Smith, before achieving greater success later that year with his own high-camp Channel 4 game show, Sticky Moments with Julian Clary. More a vehicle for his brand of humour than a genuine gameshow, Sticky Moments was a light-hearted "non-quiz" satire, with him often awarding points because he liked the contestants, rather than because they possessed a particular skill or aptitude. He later starred in the 1992 audience participation sitcom Terry and Julian with Lee Simpson, again for Channel 4.

Also in 1992, he played a cameo guest star part in the BBC drama Virtual Murder. In the episode "A Dream of Dracula", he played an undertaker, alongside other guest stars including Alfred Marks, Jill Gascoine, Ronald Fraser and Peggy Mount. In the same year, while visiting Australia, he made a controversial appearance alongside Rex Mossop on Tonight Live with Steve Vizard, during which Mossop espoused homophobic opinions. He also appeared in an episode of the improvisational comedy show Whose Line Is It Anyway? in 1991.

On 12 December 1993 he made an infamous appearance at the British Comedy Awards, where he made a joke comparing the set to Hampstead Heath (some of which is known as a cruising area for gay men) and stated he had just been fisting the former Chancellor of the Exchequer Norman Lamont, who had presented an award earlier in the ceremony. Due to the instant audience reaction, the punchline ("Talk about a red box!") was widely overlooked. Although the joke was met with uproarious laughter from the audience and Lamont himself did not complain over it, he was criticised in some newspapers, particularly by the Daily Mail and The Sun, which both launched a campaign to have him banned from television. Despite these attempts, Clary's next series was the BBC's studio-based All Rise for Julian Clary in 1996, in which he played a judge in a mock courtroom setting.

From 1998 to 2001 he hosted three series of the Sky TV show Prickly Heat, the first two series with Davina McCall, the last one with Denise van Outen. In addition, from 1999 to 2002 he was the face of Daz laundry detergent, taking over from Shane Richie, Michael Barrymore and Danny Baker. He is a recurring performer and one of the most popular performers in the ITV Pantos. He played First Henchman and Tim in 1998's Jack and The Beanstalk; The Good Fairy in 2000's Cinderella; The Genie of the Lamp in 2000's Aladdin and Chris the Cat in 2002's Dick Whittington. In 1999 he became a team captain on the quiz show It's Only TV...but I Like It alongside Phill Jupitus and Jonathan Ross. In 2003 he presented the first series of the Japanese TV clip show Sushi TV for Challenge. In 2004 he took part in the BBC series Strictly Come Dancing, finishing third with his partner, Erin Boag. In 2005 he hosted Come and Have A Go for the National Lottery.

He was the subject of This Is Your Life in 2001 when he was surprised by Michael Aspel during the curtain call of the pantomime Cinderella at the Richmond Theatre.

On 1 February 2006 he appeared on the BBC programme Who Do You Think You Are?, a genealogy series which traced his ancestors to a World War I flight engineer and German immigrants among both his mother's and father's forebears. In May 2006 and again in April 2008 he hosted an episode of the topical quiz show Have I Got News for You.

In September 2006 he returned to primetime TV as presenter and judge on Channel 5's brand new celebrity performance programme The All Star Talent Show. He was joined by two guest judges every week to assess celebrity performances and co-presented with Myleene Klass and Andi Peters. He also narrated the Channel 5 children's series Little Princess with Jane Horrocks.

In November 2006 he appeared on QI, a panel game/comedy show hosted by Stephen Fry, and also on an episode of The New Paul O'Grady Show.

In 2007 he made a cameo appearance in the Australian soap opera Neighbours, in scenes filmed in London with Natalie Bassingthwaighte.

From 20 March 2007 Clary presented a brand-new show for the BBC called The Underdog Show. Celebrities and children were paired up with rescue dogs. They then commenced training and competed against one another in obedience and agility trials in a live arena. The show ran until 26 April 2007.

He also appeared on television regularly in 2008, starting in January when he was drafted in as a relief presenter for This Morning, co-presenting alongside Fern Britton and Ruth Langsford during Phillip Schofield's absence. In April he once again fronted the BBC One series Have I Got News for You, and he filmed an episode of Celebrity Bargain Hunt in May. He was also a short-notice guest on The Paul O'Grady Show in October 2008, after Peter Andre and Katie Price could not appear (Clary and O'Grady were friends and neighbours).

In 2012 Clary was one of the contestants in Celebrity Big Brother 10 and went on to win the series. In 2013 he was a judge on the ITV entertainment series Your Face Sounds Familiar alongside Emma Bunton.

In March 2015 it was announced that Clary would take part in ITV's Give a Pet a Home show, which works alongside the RSPCA in Birmingham. The series began airing on 15 April 2015 for six episodes.

From 1 August 2015 Clary presented Nature Nuts with Julian Clary, a new three-part nature show for ITV.

Clary was a contestant on the 16th series of Taskmaster along with Lucy Beaumont, Sam Campbell, Sue Perkins and Susan Wokoma, which started broadcasting in September 2023. He came second.

== Theatre and pantomime ==
Clary played Leigh Bowery in the West End of London musical Taboo in 2002. He also took part in the touring production in 2004.

From 2 October 2007, he played the much coveted role of 'Emcee', in Rufus Norris's Olivier Award-winning production of Cabaret, which was in its second year in the West End. Clary was with the show until 19 April 2008. The following year he took part in the Strictly Come Dancing Tour in January and February 2009. He was partnered with Lilia Kopylova.

Clary starred as Michael in Le Grand Mort, a play written specifically for him by playwright Stephen Clark (prior to his death in 2016), opposite James Nelson-Joyce as Tim from 20 September to 28 October 2017 at Trafalgar Studios 2 in London's West End.

Clary was due to appear as Norman in a UK tour of The Dresser by Ronald Harwood, alongside Matthew Kelly as 'Sir' in September 2020, however due to the ongoing COVID-19 pandemic, the production was postponed to 2021.

Clary has appeared in numerous Christmas pantomimes and has recently become a regular star of the London Palladium pantomimes. In December 2019, Clary was inducted in a ceremony held by Andrew Lloyd Webber onto the Wall of Fame, joining the many stars that have appeared at the Palladium.

In 2023, Clary joined the cast of Jesus Christ Superstar for the UK tour, playing the part of Herod from 11 September onwards.

Year	Pantomime / Show	Role	Venue
1998	Jack and the Beanstalk	Henchman / Tim	The Old Vic, London (recorded for ITV)
1999	Cinderella	The Good Fairy	Brixton Academy (recorded for ITV)
2000	Aladdin	Genie of the Lamp	New Wimbledon Theatre (recorded for ITV)
2000–01	Cinderella	Dandini	Theatre Royal, Brighton
2001	Dick Whittington	Chris the Cat	New Wimbledon Theatre (recorded for ITV)
2001–02	Cinderella	Dandini	Theatre Royal, Richmond
2002	Taboo	Leigh Bowery	Venue Theatre, London
2002–03	Cinderella	Dandini	New Victoria Theatre, Woking
2003–04	Cinderella	Dandini	Birmingham Hippodrome
2004	Taboo	Leigh Bowery	UK tour
2004–05	Cinderella	Dandini	Bristol Hippodrome
2005–06	Cinderella	Dandini	Liverpool Empire Theatre
2006–07	Dick Whittington	Spirit of the Bells	Derngate Theatre, Northampton
2007	Cabaret	Emcee	Lyric Theatre, London
2009	Strictly Come Dancing Live!	Himself	UK tour
2009–10	Cinderella	Dandini	Hawth Theatre, Crawley
2010–11	Dick Whittington	Spirit of the Bells	Birmingham Hippodrome
2011–12	Cinderella	Dandini	Theatre Royal, Plymouth
2012–13	Jack and the Beanstalk	Spirit of the Beans	Mayflower Theatre, Southampton
2013–14	Jack and the Beanstalk	Spirit of the Beans	New Theatre, Cardiff
2014–15	Cinderella	Dandini	Grand Theatre, Wolverhampton
2015–16	Aladdin	Spirit of the Ring	Birmingham Hippodrome
2016–17	Cinderella	Dandini	London Palladium
2017	Le Grand Mort	Michael	Trafalgar Studios 2, London
2017–18	Dick Whittington	Spirit of the Bells	London Palladium
2018–19	Snow White	The Man in the Mirror	London Palladium
2019–20	Goldilocks and the Three Bears	The Ring Master	London Palladium
2020–21	Pantoland at the Palladium	Himself	London Palladium
2021	The Dresser	Norman	UK tour
2021–22	Pantoland at the Palladium	Himself	London Palladium
2022–23	Jack and the Beanstalk	Spirit of the Beans	London Palladium
2023–24	Jesus Christ Superstar	Herod	UK tour
2023–24	Peter Pan	Seaman Smee	London Palladium
2024–25	Robin Hood	Robin Hood	London Palladium
2025	Inside No. 9 Stage/Fright	Guest star (27 February)	Wyndham's Theatre, London
2025–26	Sleeping Beauty	King Julian	London Palladium
2026	Jesus Christ Superstar	King Herod	London Palladium

== Film ==
Clary appeared in the film Carry On Columbus (1992), an unsuccessful attempt to revive the Carry On series of films. It was widely panned by critics but was more financially profitable than the two other Columbus films released the same year: 1492: Conquest of Paradise and Christopher Columbus: The Discovery.

Clary returned to film in 2001 in The Baby Juice Express, which starred Lisa Faulkner, Samantha Womack, Ruth Jones and David Seaman, about a prisoner who is desperate to find some way of conceiving with his wife while he is in prison but the sperm ends up getting hijacked. It was released on DVD in 2004.

== Radio ==
Clary appeared on The Big Fun Show in 1988.

In 1992 Clary hosted a radio show for the BBC called Intimate Contact, the premise of which was for him to act as a genial 'Mr Fix-it' for a wide range of 'punter' problems. Clary attempted to solve these issues over the telephone, with the assistance of roving reporter "Hugh Jelly" (actor Philip Herbert). It originally aired on BBC Radio 1 for two series; the pilot and six-part first series have since been repeated on BBC Radio 4 Extra a number of times.

He is also often a guest on Just a Minute, the BBC Radio 4 comedy show.

In 2024, Clary played Neil in the Radio 4 comedy series Tom and Lauren Are Going OOT. He returned to play Neil in Series 2 of the show airing in 2025.

== Writing ==
Clary has released two large-format comedy books: My Life With Fanny The Wonder Dog (1989) and How To Be A Man (1992). Between 2005 and 2008, Clary wrote a fortnightly column for the New Statesman magazine.

=== Autobiographies ===
He published an autobiography, A Young Man's Passage, which covers his life and career up to the 1993 "Norman Lamont incident" at the British Comedy Awards (see above). Then in 2021 The Lick of Love: How Dogs Changed My Life, telling his life through his pets to more recent times.

- Clary, Julian (7 April 2005). A Young Man's Passage. Ebury Press. ISBN 978-0-09-190872-0.
- Clary, Julian (October 2021). The Lick of Love: How Dogs Changed My Life. Quercus. ISBN 978-1529412505.

=== Novels ===
In 2007, Clary released his first novel, Murder Most Fab, published by Ebury Press. His second novel, Devil in Disguise, was published in 2009.

- Clary, Julian (16 August 2007). Murder Most Fab. Ebury Press. ISBN 978-0-09-191449-3.
- Clary, Julian (7 May 2009). Devil in Disguise. Ebury Press. ISBN 978-0-09-192733-2.
- Clary, Julian (29 March 2012). Briefs Encountered. Ebury Press. ISBN 978-0-09-193883-3.
- Clary, Julian (10 October 2024). Curtain Call to Murder. Orion. ISBN 9781398717305.

=== Children's books ("The Bolds") ===
Since 2015 he has written a number of books for children:

- Clary, Julian (30 July 2015). The Bolds. Andersen Press. ISBN 978-1783443055.
- Clary, Julian (3 March 2016). The Bolds to the Rescue. Andersen Press. ISBN 978-1783443802.
- Clary, Julian (13 July 2017). The Bolds on Holiday. Andersen Press. ISBN 978-1783445066.
- Clary, Julian (February 2018). The Bolds' Great Adventure: World Book Day 2018. Andersen Press. ISBN 978-1783446292.
- Clary, Julian (September 2018). The Bolds in Trouble. Andersen Press. ISBN 978-1787611283.
- Clary, Julian (October 2019). The Bolds' Christmas Cracker: A Festive Puzzle Book. Andersen Press. ISBN 978-1783448425.
- Clary, Julian (July 2020). The Bolds Go Wild. Andersen Press. ISBN 978-1783448043.
- Clary, Julian (July 2021). The Bolds Go Green. Andersen Press. ISBN 978-1839132070.

== Music ==
Clary often performs comical renditions of musical numbers in his stage and television appearances, ranging from old classics to original material. He released a music single in 1988 (credited as the Joan Collins Fan Club), a humorous rendition of "Leader of the Pack", which he often performed in his stage and television appearances at the time. The single was produced by Rupert Hine and reached number 60 in the UK singles chart. Another single, "Wand'rin' Star", was released in 1990. The single was backed with the self-penned track "Uncanny and Unnatural".

== Personal life ==
Clary's boyfriend Christopher died of AIDS in 1991. Clary has been in a relationship with Ian Mackley since 2005 after they met in Ibiza and the couple were married on 19 November 2016. They lived at Goldenhurst Farm, a seventeenth-century manor house once owned by Noël Coward, in Aldington, Kent, until 2018. Clary lives in Camden Town, North London. On 7 September 2005 the University of London's Goldsmiths College made Clary an Honorary Fellow. In July 2014 the University of East Anglia awarded Clary an honorary Doctorate of Civil Law.

== Stand-up VHS and DVD ==
Title	Released	Notes
The Mincing Machine Tour	1989	Live at London's Hackney Empire
My Glittering Passage	1993	Live at Swansea's Grand Theatre
Live – Lord of the Mince	29 November 2010	Live at Salford's Lowry Theatre

Preceded by Denise Welch	Celebrity Big Brother Winner; Series 10 (2012)	Succeeded by Rylan Clark
