= Midnight Choir =

Norwegian band

- Origin: Norway
- Genres: Alternative rock; Alt. country; Americana; Chamber pop; Slowcore
- Years active: 1992–2004
- Label: Glitterhouse
- Past members: Paal Flaata; Al DeLoner; Ron 'Bystrøm' Olsen
- Website: www.midnightchoir.org

Midnight Choir was a Norwegian alternative rock/alt-country band active from 1992 to 2004.

== Biography ==
The members of Midnight Choir were Al DeLoner (Atle Bystrøm 'Olsen'), Paal Flaata, and Ron 'Bystrøm' Olsen. (Atle and Ron are brothers)

The band played a kind of Americana music and was named after the opening of Leonard Cohen's song "Bird on a Wire": "Like a bird on a wire, like a drunk in a midnight choir."

== Honors ==
- 1998: Spellemannprisen in the category best Rock band, for the album Amsterdam Stranded

== Discography (albums) ==
- 1994: Midnight Choir
- 1996: Olsen's Lot
- 1998: Amsterdam Stranded
- 2000: Unsung Heroine
- 2002: Selected (compilation)
- 2003: Waiting for the Bricks to Fall
- 2005: All Tomorrows Tears: The Best of Midnight Choir (compilation)
- 2008: In the Shadow of the Circus
- 2016: The Loma Ranch Sessions

From Olsen's Lot and onward produced by Chris Eckman (of The Walkabouts).

On the album Unsung Heroine, Chris Eckman is part of the band. There is also an appearance by Nils Petter Molvær on trumpet. String arrangements by Mark Nichols.

== Discography (DVD) ==
- 2008: In the Shadow of the Circus Live recording Rockefeller Oslo mars 2003

Awards
Preceded by Poor Rich Ones	Recipient of the Rock Spellemannprisen; 1998	Succeeded by Madrugada
