= Paal Flaata =

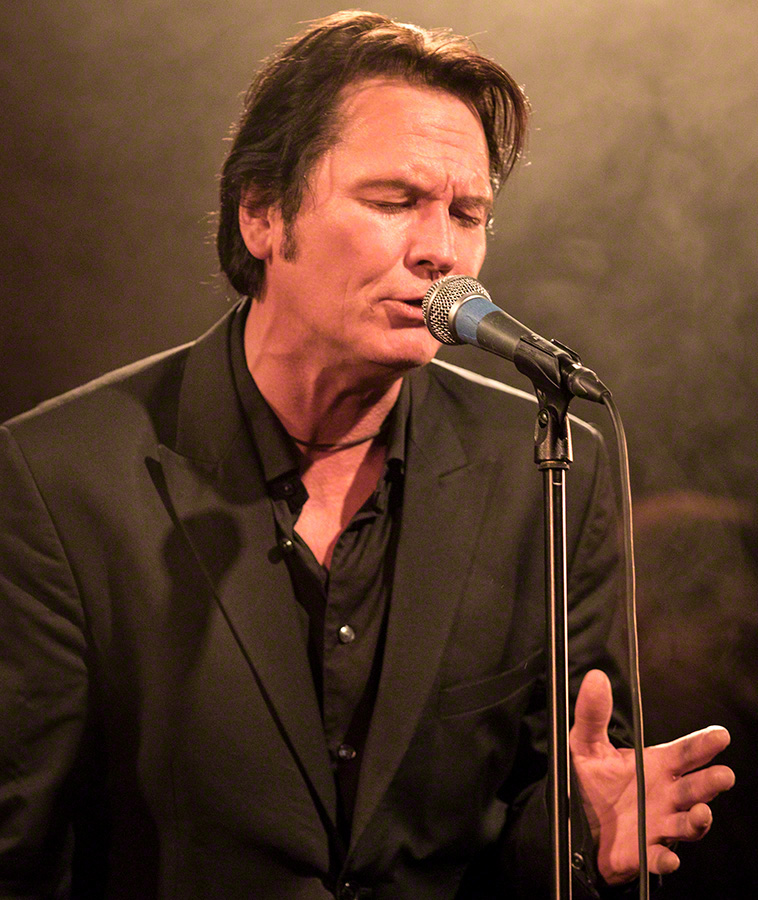
- Paal Flaata at stage in 2016

Background information
- Born: Pål Flåta; 8 April 1968 (age 57); Skien, Telemark
- Origin: Norway
- Genres: Pop music, country music
- Occupation(s): Musician, composer
- Instrument(s): Vocals, guitar
- Labels: S2 Records

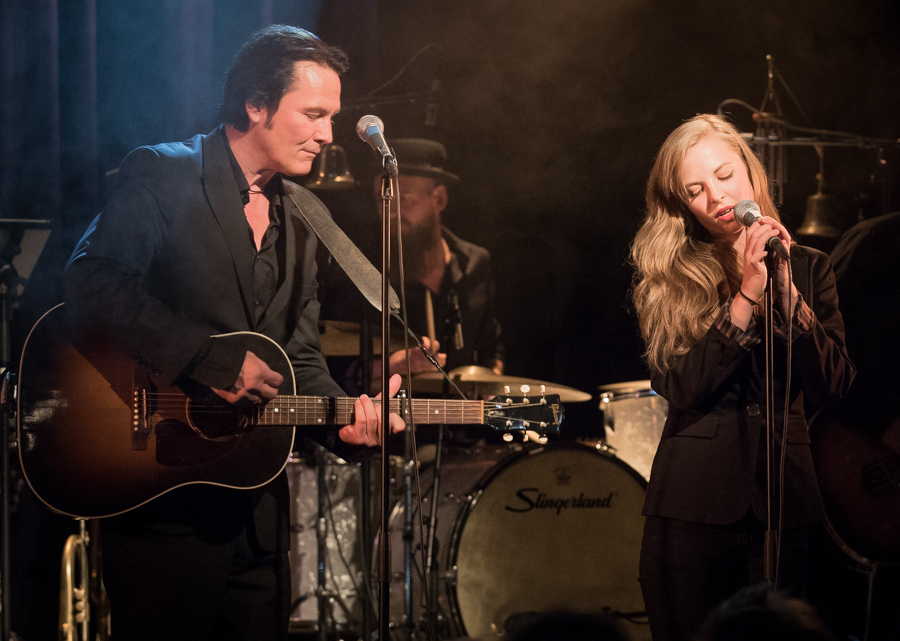
Paal Flaata and daughter Maia Flaata, 2016

Pål Flåta (born 8 April 1968) is a Norwegian vocalist, known from the band Midnight Choir and as a solo artist.

== Career ==
Flaata was born in Skien, Norway. He started his career in the Skien band Memphis News and has since then been involved in Paal & Pål Band with Pål Jensen, Carsten "Kesh" Holt, and Vidar Busk. In the early 1990s, Flaata traveled to Oslo along with two other musicians. There, they played hillbilly music on the street and were called the Hashbrowns. Then the band got a record deal, and went to the US to record an album. Hashbrowns was then transformed to Midnight Choir. Flaata was in the forefront of Midnight Choir, until the band was dissolved in 2004, and was involved in the outlet of five albums plus a compilation.

He debuted as a solo artist in 2002 with In Demand and continued as a solo artist after the dissolution of Midnight Choir. They were nominated for the Spellemannprisen 2012 for the album Wait by the Fire in the class Country.

In 2008, Flaata also participated on the children's record Magiske Kroker & Hemmeligheter produced by Linn Skåber and Jacob Young, with the song "Fredag". Other artists who participated were Simone Larsen, Maria Haukaas Storeng, Egil Hegerberg, Venke Knutson, Alejandro Fuentes, Julius Winger, Live Maria Roggen, Jørn Christensen, Alexander Rybak, and Andrea Bræin Hovig.

He has also released a trilogy of albums by three American songwriters. An album with only Chip Taylor songs, Wait By the Fire – Songs of Chip Taylor (2012), an album of only Mickey Newbury songs, Bless Us All – Songs of Mickey Newbury (2014) and an album of only Townes Van Zandt songs, Come Tomorrow – Songs of Townes Van Zandt. A single with the track "Come Tomorrow" (2016), where Paal Flaata sings with his daughter Maia Flaata, was released the same year.

He has performed alongside Stephen Ackles and Vidar Bush. They have released a tribute album to Elvis, a Christmas album and a gospel album together.

== Personal life ==
He was married 20 July 2013, to Stine Sollie Flåta (b. Sollie 1988).

== Discography ==
=== Solo albums ===
- 2002: In Demand (Universal Music)
- 2005: Rain (S2 Records)
- 2006: Christmas Island (Grammofon)
- 2008: Old Angel Midnight (Wilma Records)
- 2012: Wait by the Fire - Songs of Chip Taylor (Rootsy)
- 2014: Bless Us All - Songs of Mickey Newbury
- 2016: Come Tomorrow - Songs of Townes Van Zandt
- 2017: Love and Rain: The Athletic Sessions
- 2022: New Green Grass Will Grow
- 2023: I Heard the Bells on Christmas Day

Compilation album

- 2017: Songs - The Trilogy Collection

=== Collaborations ===
Within Midnight Choir

- 1994: Midnight Choir (Fjording)
- 1996: Olsen's Lot (S2 Records)
- 1998: Amsterdam Stranded (S2 Records)
- 2000: Unsung Heroine (Glitterhouse Records)
- 2002: Selected Songs (S2 Records)
- 2003: Waiting for the Bricks to Fall (S2 Records)
- 2005: All Tomorrows Tears: The Best of Midnight Choir (S2 Records)
- 2008: In the Shadow of the Circus
- 2016: The Loma Ranch Sessions

With Stephen Ackles and Vidar busk

- 2016: En storslått hyllest til Elvis!
- 2017: I Wish Everyday Could Be Like Christmas!
- 2018: A Thing Called Love – The Gospel Album

The Humble Servants

- 2012: Down to the Bone
