= James Tomalin =

British composer and music producer

James Tomalin is a British composer and music producer. He studied music at Cambridge University and at Goldsmiths College, and has written music for BBC TV, Channel 4, ITV and numerous films and albums. He currently runs the independent production company Oxford Digital Media.
