= Saskia Tomkins =

British musician & actress

Saskia Tomkins is a British musician and actress, living since 2007 in Ontario, Canada. She plays the violin, viola, cello and Nyckelharpa. She performs and records in several genres, including traditional, modern, jazz and classical music.

== Early life and education ==
Tomkins grew up in Kent, UK, and began studying the violin at age seven. She studied jazz and popular music at Middlesex University in London, UK, graduating with B. A. in performing arts.

== Career ==
Tomkins toured in Germany with Robb Johnson and Miranda Sykes in Johnson's band RJ3. She performed on several of Johnson's albums, released on Irregular Records.

Tomkins performed with the band Lintilla. In 2006 she won the All Britain Fiddle Championship in the category of Irish slow airs.

Tomkins met and married Irish multi-instrumentalist Steáfán Hannigan. The couple moved to Ontario, Canada in 2007. In 2008, Hannigan and Tomkins performed with The Chieftains at Roy Thompson Hall in Toronto. That year the couple formed a band called Cairdeas (Friends) with singer Elizabeth Barlow, and independently released an album of Irish songs and tunes, Generous Lover. The Hannigan family then toured in the Czech Republic, and Barlow left the band. With a new singer, Marsala Lukianchuk, Cairdeas released a second album, Christmas by Candlelight.

Tomkins and Hannigan continued to perform together and separately with various Canadian groups, and to host Irish music sessions.

In 2011 Tomkins performed in the 4th Line Theatre production of The Cavan Blazers. In 2013 she provided musical accompaniment for the play The Winslows of Derryvore at the same theatre.

In 2014 she performed an original score on the violin for the Capital Theatre production of Driving Miss Daisy in Cobourg. She was interviewed on the Northumberland 89.7 FM morning show with Jim Glover in November 2014. She also performed in the 4th Line Theatre production of Wounded Soldiers and provided musical accompaniment for the Spiel Players’ production of Lady with a Lap Dog in Peterborough.

For several years Tomkins was the principal violist in the Northumberland Orchestra in Port Hope, Ontario. She also performed in a number of live concerts with the seasonal Celtic ensemble Nollaig.

Tomkins and jazz guitarist Brandon S. Besharah, calling their duo "2ish", released two albums, Really? and Whoteva, in 2015, and performed at the Port Hope Jazz Festival and the Canadian Guitar Festival.

In 2016 Tomkins, along with Steáfán and Oisin Hannigan and Sam Allison performed as part of David Newland's travelling concert series "Northwest Passage in Story and Song", which celebrated events in Canadian history through original ballads and storytelling. Tomkins is also in the cast of the 4th Line Theatre's production of The Hero of Hunter Street.

== Personal life ==
Tomkins and Hannigan have three musical children. In 2015 they live in Baltimore, Ontario. The family occasionally performs together at local events such as Clan Hannigan.

== Festivals ==
- Kentfolk, 2007
- Millrace Folk Festival, 2007
- Goderich Celtic College, 2007
- Cobourg Highland Games, 2010
- Clarington Arts and Music Festival, 2013 (with the Maple Leaf Jug Band)
- Portneuf Drums Festival 2013
- Port Hope Jazz Festival, 2015. (2ish)
- Canadian Guitar Festival, 2015 (2ish)

== Discography ==
- Acoustically Driven, Uriah Heep, Phantom Records, 2001
- Totally Driven, Uriah Heep, self-published, 2001.
- Turn to Me, Bill Jones, 2002, Bedspring.
- 21st Century Blues, Robb Johnson, Irregular Records.
- The Triumph of Hope Over Experience. Robb Johnson, Irregular Records, 2002.
- Clockwork Music, Robb Johnson, Irregular Records.
- The Big Wheel, Robb Johnson, Irregular Records.
- Rumours of Rain Folk for Peace, Hypertension Records 2004
- Ordinary Heroes, George Papavgeris, Irregular Records, 2004
- All That Way for This, Robb Johnson and the Irregulars, Irregular Records, 2008.
- Slowdown. Al-pha-x, I-Label, 2008
- Missing_Link , Al-pha-x, DreaMusic, 2010
- Generous Lover, Cairdeas
- Christmas by Candlelight, Cairdeas
- Best Dress, Collette Savard, 2012
- West Pier Serenade. Robb Johnson, Irregular Records, 2013
- Really?, 2ish, 2015.
- Whoteva 2ish, 2015
