= Maggie Holland =

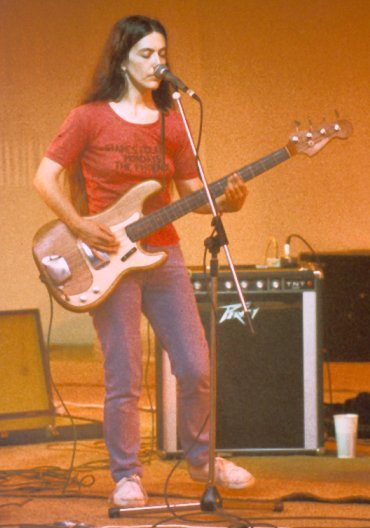
- Maggie Holland on 7 August 1983, playing in the English Country Blues Band at Goodwood Folk Festival, Sussex

Background information
- Born: 19 December 1949 (age 76); Alton, Hampshire, England
- Genres: Folk music
- Years active: Late 1960s–present
- Website: www.maggieholland.scot

Maggie Holland (born 19 December 1949) is an English singer and songwriter. She was born and raised in Alton, Hampshire, England, and became involved in the local folk club scene in the late 1960s. She has played in a number of bands and formed a number of collaborations with other artists, but has become well known in recent times as a solo artist and songwriter. She enjoys singing songs with meaningful words and has named her major influences as Bob Dylan, Al Stewart, Dave Evans, Leon Rosselson, Billy Bragg, Bruce Cockburn and Robb Johnson. Several of her own songs have entered the repertoires of notable artists, such as Martin Carthy and June Tabor and, in 2000, Holland received the BBC Radio 2 Folk Awards "Best Song of 1999" for her song "A Place Called England". Colin Irwin wrote of her in fRoots magazine: "The proof that outstanding contemporary songs are still being written”. She now lives in Leith, Scotland.

== Career history ==
=== Early collaborations ===
Her first work as a professional musician was as bassist and, later, singer in Hot Vultures, alongside Ian A. Anderson. By this time she had moved to Farnham, Surrey. Hot Vultures toured and recorded from 1973 to 1979.

Hot Vultures became the English Country Blues Band (ECBB) when Holland and Anderson were joined by Rod Stradling and Sue Harris (Sue Harris later being replaced by Chris Coe).

The ECBB expanded to become Tiger Moth, an electric country dance band, which lasted from 1984 until 1989.

This was a further expansion of the Tiger Moth line-up, including occasional musicians from around the world, and represented a move away from purely English and American traditions to become one of the first "crossover" world music bands. Alongside Holland and the other Tiger Moth members, line-ups have included such respected international musicians as Flaco Jimenez, Dembo Konte, Kausu Kuyateh, Hijaz Mustapha and Abdul Tee-Jay.

=== Solo career ===
From 1980, Holland, whilst continuing as a member of the ECBB and its successor Tiger Moth, began performing occasionally as a solo artist, singing and accompanying herself on guitar or banjo, performing a mix of modern and traditional British and American songs. She released her first solo album, Still Pause, in 1983. She also occasionally performed as a duo with Chris Coe, including a tour of the far east in 1985. Also in 1985 she was the female lead singer in the National Theatre's three-month run of Tony Harrison's Mysteries trilogy. Holland moved from Farnham to Oxford in 1986.

Holland continued to punctuate her solo career with collaborations with other artists whose work she admired.

=== Songwriting ===
In 1987, Holland began to write her first songs, encouraged by Jon Moore, one of her colleagues from Tiger Moth, with whom she had made an EP.

==== Notable works ====
"Perfumes of Arabia"

Holland wrote this in April 1991 about the Gulf War. It was first published on her 1992 album, Down to the Bone. Later in the year, Martin Carthy recorded it with Dave Swarbrick for their album Skin and Bone. An earlier live version sung by Martin Carthy on 17 October 1991 at Graffiti's, Pittsburg, was released in 2001 on The Carthy Chronicles.

The song was covered by VALVE on their 2023 album Tiny Pilots.

"A Proper Sort of Gardener"

"A Proper Sort of Gardener" is jointly credited to Holland and Jon Moore. The song is reportedly a reflection by Holland about her childhood in Alton.

"Sandy Hill"

Composed while she was living in Farnham, this collaboration with Moore focuses on the fact that it is not just inner cities which have their problem areas.

"A Place Called England"

The song which won Holland an award in the inaugural (2000) BBC Radio 2 Folk Awards was, in her own words, inspired by Christopher Hill's book "The World Turned Upside Down", Leon Rosselson's song of the same name, Naomi Mitchison's "Sea-Green Ribbons", William Cobbett's "Cottage Economy", Hamish Henderson's "Freedom Come-All-Ye", Jean Giono's "The Man Who Planted Trees" and discussions with Scots, such as Dick Gaughan.

=== Recent collaborations ===
With Moore and Kevin Mason she formed Maggie's Farm in 1986. The band's name is a reference to the Bob Dylan song of that name, Dylan being one of Holland's favourite songwriters. Maggie's Farm toured Bangladesh for the British Council in 1988.

In 1989, she began to play bass in Robb Johnson's band. Holland much admires Johnson's songwriting and has recorded a number of his works.

During 2010, Holland participated in a project featuring the music of Derroll Adams, arranged and directed by Wiet Van Der Liest. The ensemble included seven female singers including Holland who also played five-string banjo, a 13-piece chamber orchestra, guitarist Roland Van Campenhout and Wiet van de Leest on violin. They performed the programme at the Brosella, Gent and Dranouter festivals in 2010.

== Discography ==
=== Solo recordings ===
- Still Pause (Rogue Records FMSL 2002 (1983)
- Down to the Bone (Rogue Records FMSD 5022, 1992)
- By Heart (Rhiannon Records RHYD 5008, 1995)
- Getting There (Irregular Records IRR035, 1999)
- Circle of Light (Irregular Records IRR030, 2003)
- Bones (compilation CD) (Weekend Beatnik WEBE 9044, 2007)
- The Dust of Rage (Irregular Records IRR126, 2023)

=== Collaborative recordings ===
- Carrion On – Hot Vultures (Red Rag Records RRR 005, 1975)
- East Street Shakes – Hot Vultures (Red Rag Records RRR 015, 1977)
- Up The Line – Hot Vultures (Plant Life Records, 1979)
- No Rules – English Country Blues Band (Dingles DIN 323, 1982)
- The Continuous Preaching Blues – Mike Cooper and Ian A. Anderson (Appaloosa AP037, 1984)
- Home and Deranged – English Country Blues Band (Rogue Records FMSL 2004, 1984)
- Tiger Moth – Tiger Moth (Rogue Records FMSL2006, 1984)
- A Short Cut – Maggie Holland and Jon Moore (Rogue Records FMST4008 (1986)
- Howling Moth – Tiger Moth (Rogue Records FMSL 2012, 1988)
- Salt of the Earth – Orchestre Super Moth (Rogue Records 12FMS 106, 1988)
- The World at Sixes and Sevens – Orchestre Super Moth (Rogue Records 12FMS-6-7, 1989)
- Jali House Rock – Various Artists (Rogue Records BFMSD 5019, 1989)
- Mothballs – Tiger Moth (compilation CD) (Omnium Records OMM2012D, 1996)
- Vulturama – Hot Vultures (compilation CD) (Weekend Beatnik WEBE 9031, 1998)
- Unruly (1.1) – English Country Blues Band (compilation CD) (Weekend Beatnik WEBE 9040, 2002)
