= Irregular Records =

- Founded: 1985
- Founder: Robb Johnson
- Genre: Folk
- Country of origin: UK
- Official website: http://www.irregularrecords.co.uk/

Irregular Records is a British independent record label specialising in folk music, which was established in 1985 by the singer Robb Johnson. In addition to Johnson's own recordings the label has also issued albums by artists such as Barb Jungr, Des de Moor, Maggie Holland and Russell Churney.

== Releases to date ==
In the label's history there have been over a hundred releases to date.

| Year | Cat.no. | Title | Artist | Format |
|---|---|---|---|---|
| 1985 | IRR001 | In Amongst The Rain | Robb Johnson | LP |
| 1985 | IRR002 | Leaking Secrets | The Ministry of Humour | cassette |
| 1986 | IRR003 | And All the Other Ones You Never Even Get to Hear About | The Ministry of Humour | cassette |
| 1987 | IRR004 | Songs for the New Jerusalem | Robb Johnson | cassette |
| 1988 | IRR005 | Skewed, Slewed, Stewed & Awkward | Robb Johnson | LP |
| 1988 | IRR006 | ? | ? | ? |
| 1988 | IRR007 | The Herald of Free Enterprise | Robb Johnson | 7" single |
| ? | IRR008 | ? | ? | ? |
| 1989 | IRR009 | Small Town World | Robb Johnson | LP |
| 1990 | IRR010 | Wasted Years | Robb Johnson | 7" single |
| 1991 | IRR011 | Living in the Rubbish | Robb Johnson & Pip Collings | 12" single |
| 1991 | IRR012 | Overnight | Robb Johnson & Pip Collings | CD |
| 1992 | IRR013 | Tourists & Casualties | The Johnson Collings Band | cassette |
| 1993 | IRR014 | Heart's Desire | Robb Johnson & Pip Collings | CD/cassette |
| 1993 | IRR015 | Head, Heart & Hand | Steve Hunt | cassette |
| 1994 | IRR016 | 1-2-3 | The Johnson Collings Band | cassette |
| 1994 | IRR017 | The Lack Of Jolly Ploughboy | Robb Johnson & Pip Collings | CD |
| 1995 | IRR018 | Romantic or Ridiculous | Tony Warren | cassette |
| 1995 | IRR019 | Royalty and Empire | Steve Hunt Saboteurs | cassette |
| 1995 | IRR020 | Saturday Afternoon Red Army | Robb Johnson & the Gentlemen of the Terraces | CD EP |
| 1995 | IRR021 | Lavender Blues | Robb Johnson | CD EP |
| 1995 | IRR022 | The Soundhole '95 | Various artists | cassette |
| 1995 | IRR023 | Interesting Times | Robb Johnson | CD |
| 1996 | IRR024 | No Surrender | Graham Larkbey & the Robb Johnson Band | cassette |
| 1996 | IRR025 | The Night Café | Robb Johnson | CD |
| 1996 | IRR026 | Hell's Kitchen | Robb Johnson Roots Band | CD |
| 1997 | IRR027 | Overnight | Robb Johnson | CD |
| 1997 | IRR028 | Ugly Town | Robb Johnson | cassette |
| 1998 | IRR029 | Invisible People | Robb Johnson | CD |
| 1998 | IRR030 | Gentle Men | Roy Bailey, Vera Coomans, Robb Johnson, Koen De Cauter and the Golden Serenaders | double CD |
| 1998 | IRR031 | Tiger Tracks | Millan | CD |
| 1998 | IRR032 | Yeah Yeah Yeah | Robb Johnson Band | CD |
| 1998 | IRR033 | Ne Me Quitte Pas/Brel Songs By... | Various artists | CD |
| 1999 | IRR034 | Coppers and Brass | Alan Burton and Steve Hunt | CD EP |
| 1999 | IRR035 | Getting There | Maggie Holland | CD |
| 1999 | IRR036 | The Big Wheel | Robb Johnson | CD |
| 1999 | IRR037 | The Big Wheel - The Second XI and Alternative Versions | Robb Johnson | cassette |
| 1999 | IRR038 | Water of Europe | Des de Moor | CD |
| 1999 | IRR039 | Bare | Barb Jungr | CD |
| 2000 | IRR040 | Skin Deep | Boka Halat | CD |
| 2000 | IRR041 | You're All Weird | The Astronauts | CD |
| 2000 | IRR042 | Margaret Thatcher: My Part in her Downfall | Robb Johnson | CD |
| 2001 | IRR043 | 21st Century Blues | Robb Johnson with Miranda Sykes & Saskia Tomkins | CD |
| 2001 | IRR044 | Article 14 | Various artists (including Chumbawamba, Tom Robinson and Fun-Da-Mental) | CD |
| 2002 | IRR045 | The Triumph of Hope Over Experience | Robb Johnson | CD |
| 2002 | IRR046 | 9 x 2: An Album of Contemporary English Chanson | Various artists | CD |
| 2002 | IRR047 | Maximum Respect | Robb Johnson | CD |
| 2003 | IRR048 | Clockwork Music | Robb Johnson | CD |
| 2004 | IRR049 | Scarlet Stories | Caroline Nin | CD |
| 2004 | IRR050 | Circle of Light | Maggie Holland | CD |
| 2004 | IRR051 | Darkness and Disgrace: Des de Moor and Russell Churney Perform the Songs of David Bowie | Des de Moor and Russell Churney | CD |
| 2004 | IRR052 | Don't Look Down | Miranda Sykes | CD |
| 2004 | IRR053 | On the Boulevard des Hommes | Monique | CD |
| 2004 | IRR054 | Tony Blair: My Part in his Downfall | Robb Johnson | double CD |
| 2004 | IRR055 | Ordinary Heroes | George Papavgeris | CD |
| 2004 | IRR056 | Fast Lane Roogalator | Fast Lane Roogalator | CD |
| 2005 | IRR057 | A Beginner's Guide | Robb Johnson | CD |
| 2005 | IRR058 | Miranda Sykes Band | Miranda Sykes Band | CD |
| 2005 | IRR059 | Metro | Robb Johnson | CD |
| 2006 | IRR060 | Mr Jeays | Phil Jeays | CD |
| 2006 | IRR061 | And For My Next Trick | George Papavgeris | CD |
| 2006 | IRR062 | Elvis Lives Here | Swill and The Swaggerband | CD |
| 2006 | IRR063 | Saturday Night at The Fire Station | Robb Johnson & The Irregulars | CD |
| 2006 | IRR064 | Paris Lite | Monique | CD |
| 2006 | IRR065 | Picture Postcards | Tracey Curtis | CD |
| 2007 | IRR066 | All That Way for This | Robb Johnson & The Irregulars | CD |
| 2008 | IRR067 | The Commons | David Rovics | CD |
| 2008 | IRR068 | Love & Death & Politics | Robb Johnson & The Irregulars | CD |
| 2009 | IRR069 | Devil on the Wind | The Men They Couldn't Hang | CD |
| 2009 | IRR070 | We Can Make the World Stop | Alun Parry | CD |
| 2009 | IRR071 | Margaret Thatcher - My Part in Her Downfall (Deluxe) | Robb Johnson & The Irregulars (each disc and the accompanying slipcase has a separate catalogue number) | 4xCD box set |
| 2009 | IRR072 | Margaret Thatcher - My Part in Her Downfall (Deluxe) | Robb Johnson & The Irregulars (each disc and the accompanying slipcase has a separate catalogue number) | 4xCD box set |
| 2009 | IRR073 | Margaret Thatcher - My Part in Her Downfall (Deluxe) | Robb Johnson & The Irregulars (each disc and the accompanying slipcase has a separate catalogue number) | 4xCD box set |
| 2009 | IRR074 | Margaret Thatcher - My Part in Her Downfall (Deluxe) | Robb Johnson & The Irregulars (each disc and the accompanying slipcase has a separate catalogue number) | 4xCD box set |
| 2009 | IRR075 | Margaret Thatcher - My Part in Her Downfall (Deluxe) | Robb Johnson & The Irregulars (each disc and the accompanying slipcase has a separate catalogue number) | 4xCD box set |
| 2009 | IRR076 | The Ghost of Love | Robb Johnson & The Irregulars | CD |
| 2010 | IRR077 | Man Walks Into a Pub | Robb Johnson | CD |
| 2011 | IRR078 | Causes and Cures | Al Baker & the Dole Queue | CD |
| 2011 | IRR079 | More to be Revealed | Mike Reinstein | CD |
| 2011 | IRR080 | Some Recent Protest Songs | Robb Johnson | CD |
| 2011 | IRR081 | Spitfire Bridge | Wob | CD |
| 2011 | IRR082 | Once Upon a Time | Robb Johnson & The Irregulars | CD |
| 2011 | IRRV082V | Once Upon a Time | Robb Johnson & The Irregulars | Vinyl LP |
| 2012 | IRR083 | Happily Ever After | Robb Johnson & The Irregulars | CD |
| 2012 | IRRV083V | Happily Ever After | Robb Johnson & The Irregulars | Vinyl LP |
| 2013 | IRR084 | Thoughts in the Dark | Tracy Curtis | CD |
| 2013 | IRR085 | Bluesman | John B. Spencer | CD |
| 2013 | IRR086 | Bring Down the Moon | Robb Johnson & The Irregulars | CD |
| 2013 | IRR087 | West Pier Serenade | Robb Johnson | CD |
| 2013 | IRR088 | Gentle Men | Robb Johnson and others | Double CD (digipack) |
| 2013 | IRR089 | Gentle Men | Robb Johnson and others | Double CD with hardback book |
| 2014 | IRR090 | Sweet Jane / Bay of Angels | Robb Johnson | Vinyl single |
| 2014 | IRR091 | Us & Them | Robb Johnson | CD |
| 2014 | IRR092 | Outsider | John Forrester | CD |
| 2014 | IRR093 | Make Believe / When My Grandfather Played Football | Robb Johnson | Vinyl single |
| 2015 | IRR094 | Here Goes Nothing | Robb Johnson & The Irregulars | CD |
| 2015 | IRR094V | Here Goes Nothing | Robb Johnson & The Irregulars | Vinyl LP |
| 2015 | IRR095 | Cheap and Cheerful / The Top of This Wheel | Robb Johnson & The Irregulars | Vinyl single |
| 2015 | IRR096 | A Long March Home | Mike Reinstein | CD |
| 2015 | IRR097 | Position of Jupiter | Roger Stevens | CD |
| 2015 | IRR098B | Live @ The Albert | Robb Johnson & The Irregulars | Demo, download only from USA |
| 2015 | IRR099 | Gentle Men, a Solo Performance | Robb Johnson | Live CD |
| 2016 | IRR100 | My Best Regards | Robb Johnson | CD |
| 2016 | IRR101 | Time and Tide | Wob | CD |
| 2016 | IRR102 | Don't Close the Bar/Even Steve McQueen | Robb Johnson | Vinyl single |
| 2016 | IRR103 | The Former Me | John Forrester | CD |
| 2016 | IRR104 | Take the Slow Train | Philip Jeays | CD |
| 2016 | IRR2016V | JC4PM For Me | Robb Johnson and the Corbynistas | Vinyl single |
| 2017 | IRR105V | The Beautiful Dark | Robb Johnson | 10" vinyl |
| 2017 | IRR107 | We Are Now Approaching Hassocks | Roger Stevens | CD |
| 2017 | IRR108 | Songs From the Last Seven Years | Robb Johnson | CD |
| 2018 | IRR109 | Restless | John Forrester | CD |
| 2018 | IRR110 | Acts of Love | Mike Reinstein | CD |
| 2018 | IRR111 | Angelina Supercop | Philip Jeays | CD |
| 2018 | IRR223 | Ordinary Giants | Robb Johnson | Triple CD |
| 2020 | IRR112V | Eurotopia | Robb Johnson | Vinyl album |
| 2020 | IRR113 | Eurotopia | Robb Johnson | CD |

== See also ==
- List of record labels
