= Jonathan Moore =

Jon or Jonathan Moore may refer to:

== Performers ==
- Jonathan Moore (1923–2008), American actor on Love of Life (1966–1978) and as Dr. Lyman Hall in 1776
- Jonathan Moore (actor) (born 1963), British actor, screenwriter, librettist, and opera director
- Jonathan Moore (musician) (1969–2017), American rapper, DJ and producer
- Jonathan Patrick Moore (born 1982), Australian-American actor, a/k/a Jonathan Wood

== Public officials ==
- Jonathan Baker Moore (1825–1889), American assemblyman in Wisconsin and Union Army general
- Jonathan Moore (State Department official) (1932–2017), American Director of Refugee Program Bureau, 1987–1989
- Jonathan M. Moore (born 1966), American diplomat, coordinator of Health Incident Response Task Force

== Sportsmen ==
- Jon Moore (born 1955), Welsh footballer
- Jonathan Moore (basketball) (born 1957), American power forward in Finland's Korisliiga
- Jonathan Moore (long jumper) (born 1984), English gold medalist in track and field
- Jonathan Moore (golfer) (born 1985), American golf coach at University of Oklahoma

== See also ==
- Jonathan More (born before 1960), English member of electronic music duo Coldcut
- John Moore (disambiguation)
