= Ghost of Love =

Ghost of Love may refer to:

- "Ghost of Love" (The Rasmus song), 2009
- "Ghost of Love" (Fiction Factory song), 1984
- "Ghost of Love", a song by Johnny Hates Jazz from Magnetized, 2013
- The Ghost of Love, an album by Robb Johnson and the Irregulars, 2009
- "Ghost of Love", a song by David Lynch from the film Inland Empire
