= Don't Get Married =

Single by The Dubliners
- Released: 4 June 1987
- Genre: Folk, Irish
- Length: 3:15
- Label: HARMAC
- Songwriter: Leon Rosselson

The Dubliners singles chronology
"The Irish Rover" (1987)	"Don't Get Married" (1987)	"Jack's Heroes" (1990)

"Don't Get Married" is a song written by Leon Rosselson, which is best known for being covered in a single by The Dubliners, released in June 1987 and charting at No.24 in the Irish Charts. This is the only single to be released where Sean Cannon takes lead vocals.

Some have criticised the lyrics to the song as misandrist, including the folk singer Dick Gaughan, who is a supporter of feminist causes.

== Charts ==
Chart (1987)	Peak position
Ireland (IRMA)	24
