= Alun Parry =

English musician

Alun Parry is an English folk singer-songwriter and community music festival organiser from Liverpool.

Parry attended the Liverpool Blue Coat School and began his musical career as busker shortly after learning to play guitar, and went on to be awarded the title of Merseyside’s number one busker by the local media. He is known for his slice of life lyrics and punchy performance style. A story telling musician, Parry often weaves social commentary into his tales, and political songs feature as part of his repertoire.

He went on to become a solo acoustic artist before recording his first album Corridors of Stone in November 2006. The album represented a new sound for Parry as he was backed by drummer Thomas Western and bass player Rob Harper, formerly a keyboard player with The Mighty Wah. Lianne Steinberg, a music writer in the Big Issue said of the album: "The Liverpudlian singer-songwriter packs more weight in the punch of his folk songs than most acoustic musicians do in a lifetime".

Parry followed this up with a commemorative EP of original songs dedicated to Liverpool to celebrate the city's 800th Birthday, featuring drummer Howard Northover and bassist Chad Draper.

Spencer Leigh described Parry as "one of the most incisive songwriters on Merseyside". BBC Radio's longest running folk radio programme, BBC Radio Merseyside's Folkscene, featured Parry's music during a one-hour profile, broadcast in December 2006, and a second one-hour profile in September 2009.

Parry has been a champion of the local music scene, having promoted Second Friday events, Payday Playtime band nights at 'The Casa' and for hosting his weekly Acoustic Slice showcases at Liverpool's Parr Street Studios from 2006 to 2008. Liverpool.com described Acoustic Slice as "by far the best acoustic night in Liverpool."

The Liverpool Echo, in the run up to European Capital of Culture year, named Alun Parry, along with the city's other poets, playwrights, authors and songwriters within the top 30 reasons why Liverpool was culturally great. In January 2008 Parry was chosen by BBC Radio 4 to present a grassroots music special to introduce Liverpool’s European Capital of Culture celebrations.

Parry was also the founder and organiser of the Liverpool Working Class Music Festival, supported by the TUC, which took place annually 2008-2011 with the aim of bringing the very best radical musicians to Liverpool for a celebration of working class life through music and song. It grew to be the largest festival of its kind in the world.

In September 2009, the album We Can Make The World Stop was released by Irregular Records, a Brighton based record label specialising in radical song, and closely associated with protest singer Robb Johnson. Other performers supporting Parry on the album were Barry Briercliffe, Stu Thompson, Jon Withnall and Sharon Latham.

In February 2010, Parry founded and launched the Woody Guthrie Folk Club which aimed to be a home to songs of struggle, humour and justice. The folk club took place monthly on the final Thursday of each month and ran until 2013. He went on to organise the UKs Official Woody Guthrie Centennial concert at The Liverpool Philharmonic Hall, featuring Woody's daughter Nora Guthrie, and Peter Donegan, the son of Lonnie Donegan.

In September 2013, he released the album When The Sunlight Shines, which consisted of 15 tracks. It featured the musicianship of Gina Le Faux, Gabrielle Monk, Gerard Sugrue, Stu Thompson and Emma Runswick. The album stayed true to Parry's social commentary and storytelling style, but with an Irish American feel to the music. The album received critical acclaim. The Liverpool Echo named it as its album of the week. BBC Radio Merseyside featured the album in a one-hour special on their Folkscene programme. R2 magazine described it as "glorious - a tremendous breadth of lyrical ambition."

He has since released several further albums - Whatever Your Struggle, Freedom Rider, Make Love Stick, Sweet Optimism, Speak Easy Sing Hard, and Invisible People - as well as a radio ballad album called Tressell and Me.

During the coronavirus lockdown of 2020 he performed 12 free online concerts that became the basis for the 12 volume set of EPs called The Lockdown Sessions.

Outside of music, Alun Parry was the founder of A.F.C. Liverpool, a co-operative football club who have been playing in the North West Counties League Division One since the 2008/2009 season. He stood down from the club chairman's role in November 2008, but was unanimously made Life President by supporters at the club's AGM in August 2009. He is the co-director of the social documentary, My Fifties Liverpool, which was screened at FACT Independent Cinema in April 2011.

He is the writer of the children's book, The Little Girl Who Forgot How To Dance, which was illustrated by the folk singer, Tracey Curtis.

He is the writer of How To Remove Trauma Response: A Memory Reconsolidation Guidebook For Therapists and Coaches, published in 2022.

Parry works as a psychotherapist. He is Director of The Liverpool Psychotherapy Practice and host of the podcast, A Slice of Therapy.

He is a graduate of the University of Liverpool.

== Discography ==
- Corridors of Stone (2006)
- Liverpool 800 EP (2007)
- We Can Make The World Stop (2009)
- When The Sunlight Shines (2013)
- Freedom Rider (2017)
- Whatever Your Struggle (2019)
- Make Love Stick (2020)
- Sweet Optimism (2022)
- Speak Easy Sing Hard (2023)
- Invisible People (2025)
