= Les Barker =

British poet (1947–2023)

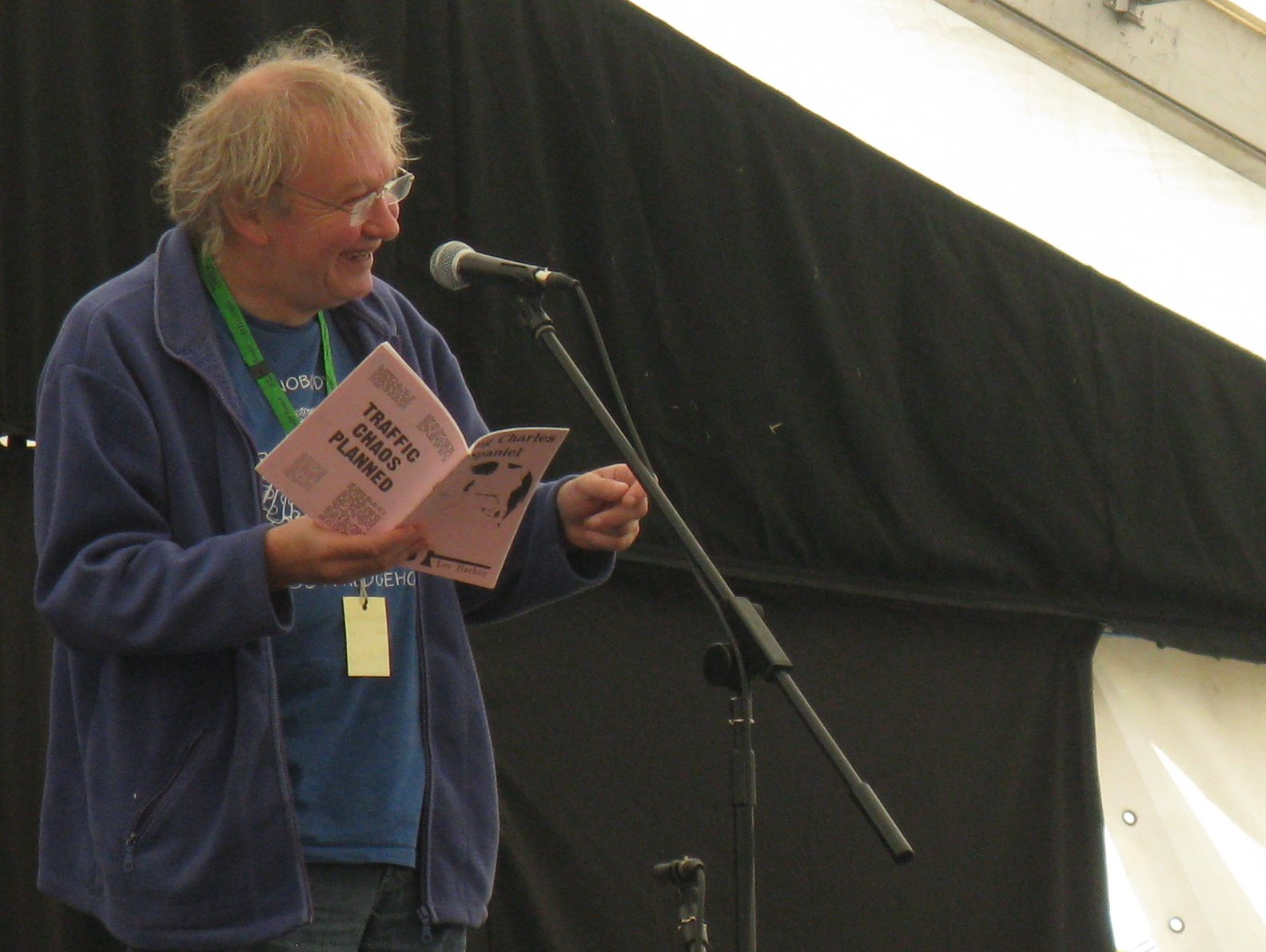
- Barker at the 2010 Ely Folk Festival
- Born: 30 January 1947; Manchester, England
- Died: 14 January 2023 (aged 75); Oswestry, England
- Occupations: Poet and performer
- Writing career
- Genre: Parody

Les Barker (30 January 1947 – 14 January 2023) was an English poet. He wrote comedic poetry, parodies of popular songs, and also serious works.

== Biography ==
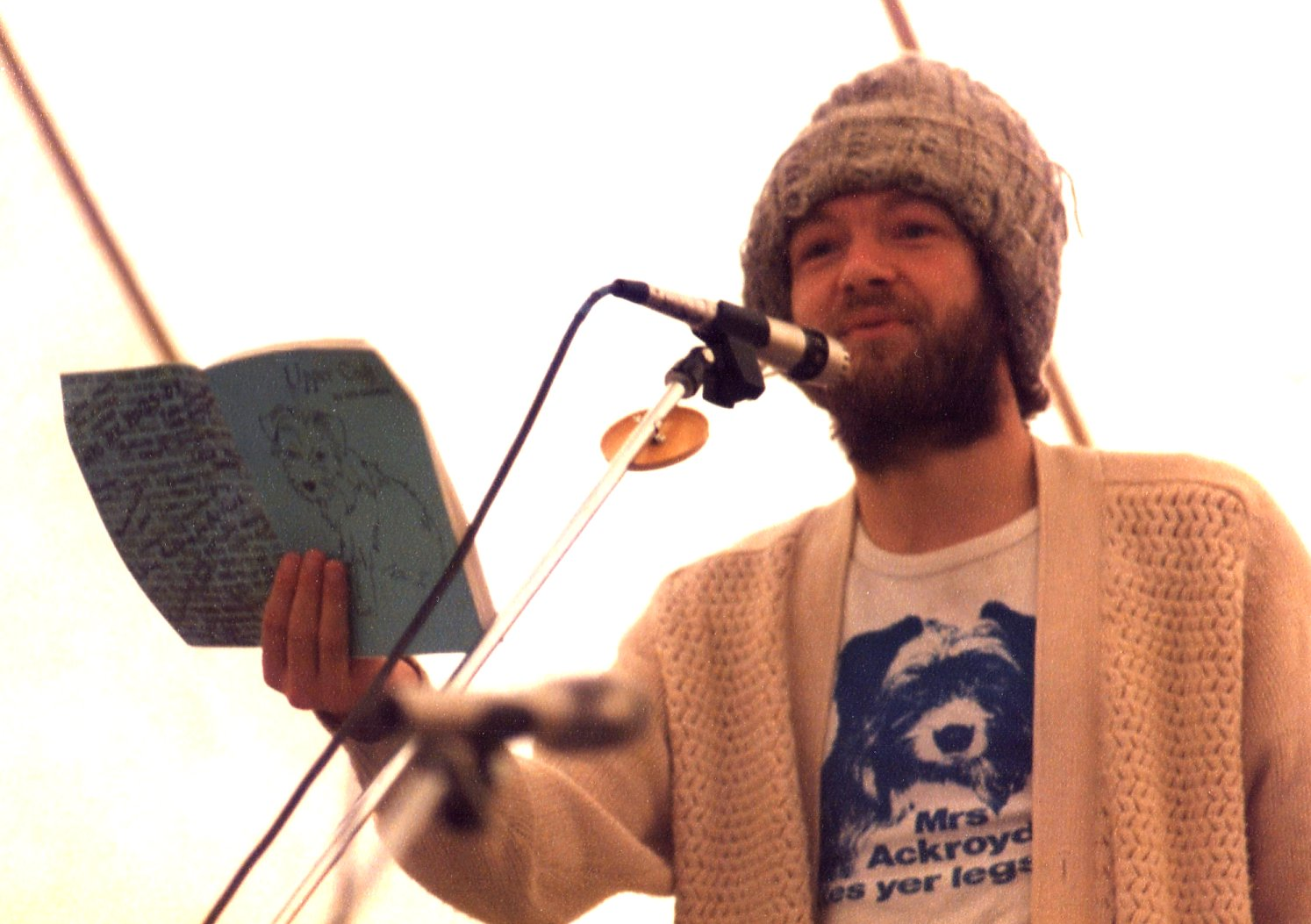
Barker on stage at the 1980 Towersey Folk Festival

Barker was born in Manchester. He studied accountancy before he realised that he had a talent for writing. At the beginning of his career he toured around folk music venues as a solo performer, and later with The Mrs Ackroyd Band (named after his mongrel dog Mrs Ackroyd.) Barker was not a singer and the Mrs Ackroyd Band, with classically trained vocalists Hilary Spencer and Alison Younger, and keyboard player Chris Harvey, enabled his parodies to be sung live. He toured around Britain and such countries as Hong Kong, Australia, New Zealand, the United States and Canada.

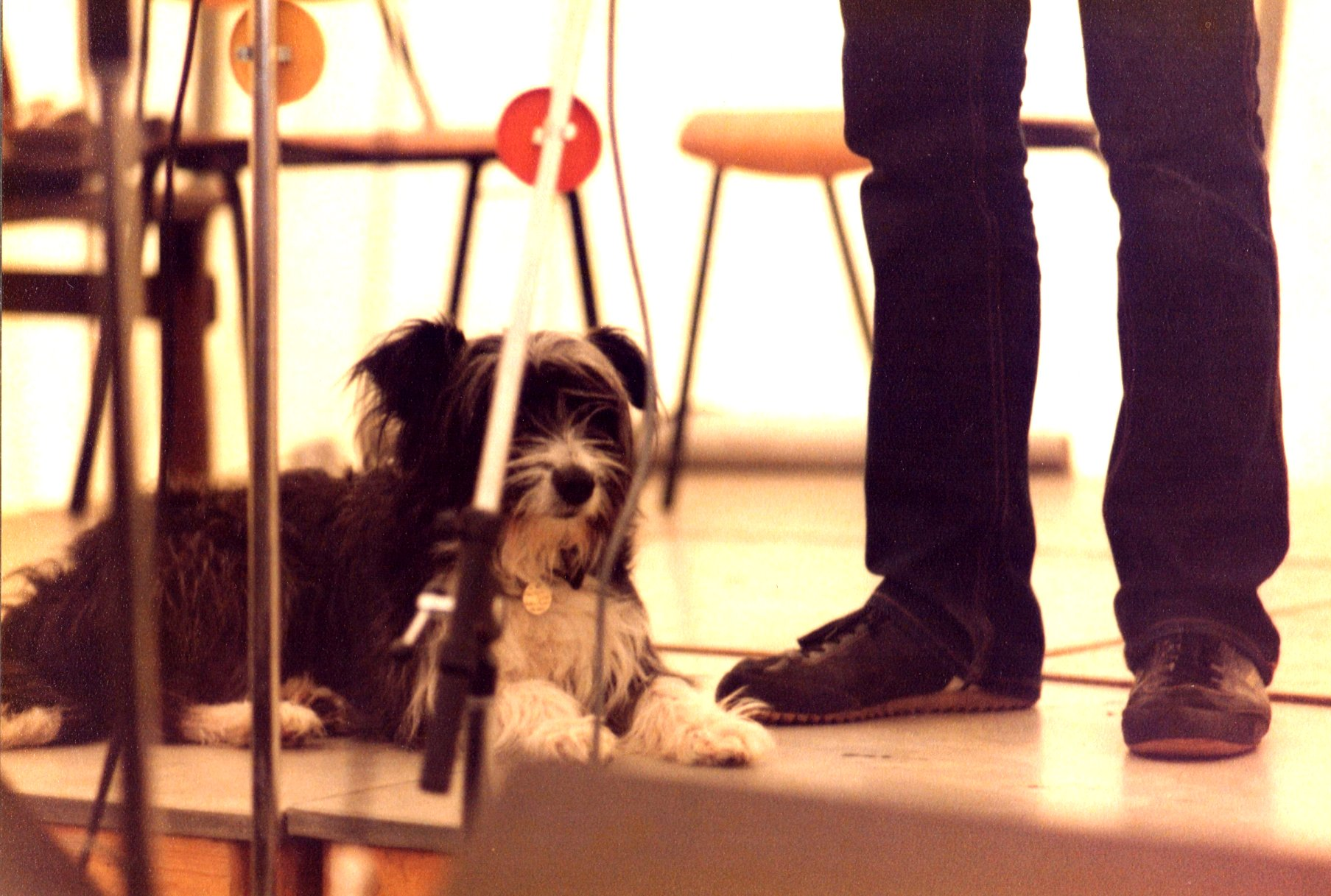
Barker's dog, "Mrs Ackroyd" on stage at her master's feet at the 1980 Towersey Folk Festival

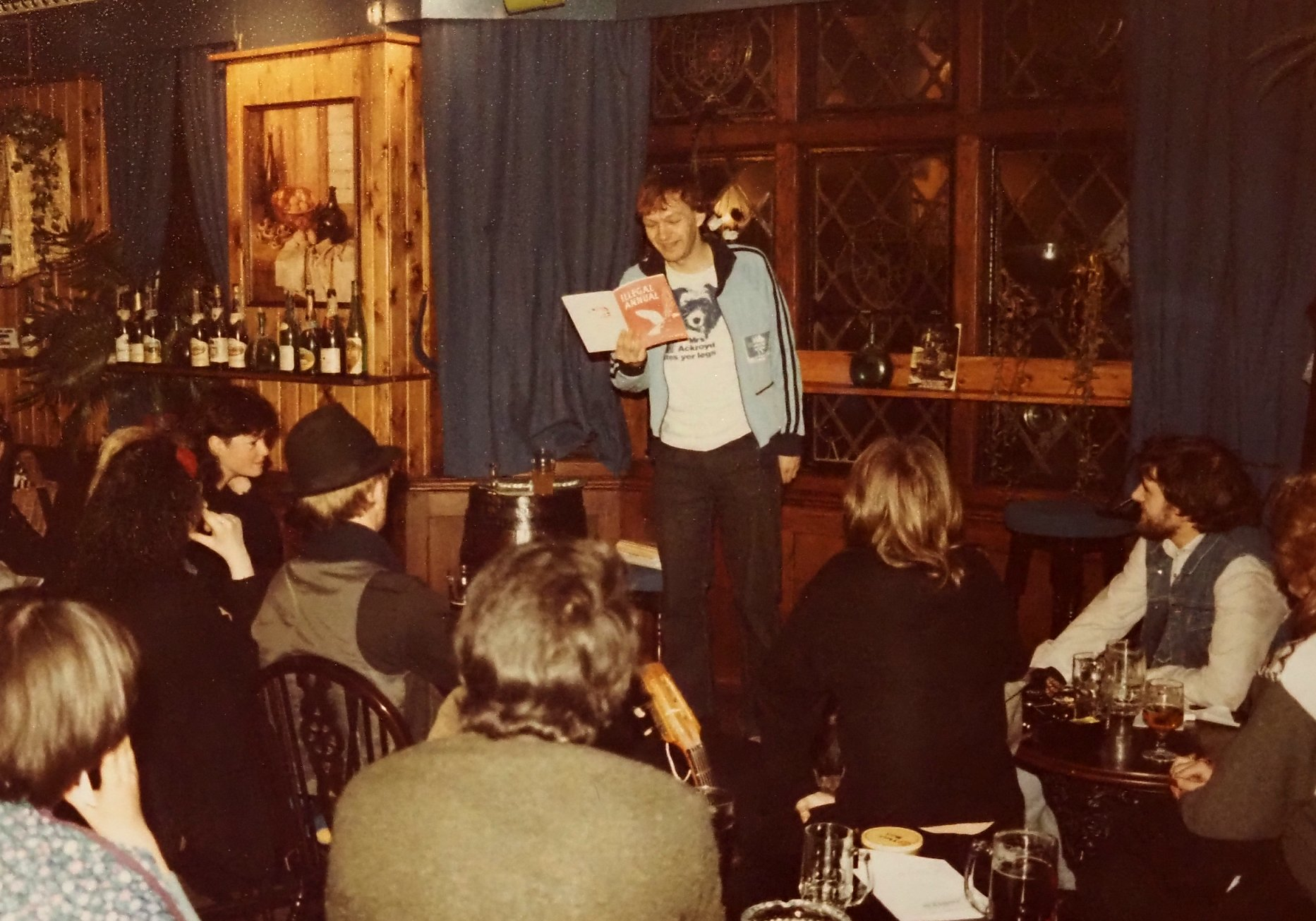
Barker reading at a central London Folk Club, Spring 1984

Barker authored 77 books and released 20 albums. His books contain a mixture of monologues, comic songs, and serious songs. The monologues tip the hat to Marriott Edgar. Like Edgar, Barker has created several recurring characters and themes such as 'Jason and the Arguments', 'Cosmo the Fairly Accurate Knife Thrower', 'Captain Indecisive', 'The Far off Land of Dyslexia' and 'Spot of the Antarctic', which have become trademarks of Barker's work. Both his comic and serious songs have become standards for other singers such as Waterson–Carthy and June Tabor.

Barker was also one of the few writers (alongside Stephen Sondheim, with his parody "The Boy From...") to get the Welsh place named Llanfairpwllgwyngyllgogerychwyrndrobwllllantisiliogogogoch into a song successfully (it forms the main chorus of a song of the same name, and is sung four times). In the mid 2000s, Barker moved to Bwlchgwyn in Wrexham, Wales, and learnt Welsh, producing two books of poetry written in the Welsh tongue.

In 2008 he was awarded the NIACE Inspire Award as Welsh Learner of the Year, and recited his poem "Have you Got Any News of the Iceberg?" in Welsh at the presentation in Swansea.

In 2009, a campaign by his folk fanbase sought to have him chosen as the British Poet Laureate.

After a heart attack in January 2008, Barker began solo gigging again. Barker remained firmly rooted in the circuit of folk clubs and festivals. He has also performed as part of a double act with Keith Donnelly under the name "Idiot and Friend".

After being diagnosed with cancer and undergoing chemotherapy, he announced his retirement from touring in October 2022, but intended to maintain his online presence via YouTube.

On 14 January 2023, Barker attended a match of The New Saints F.C. at Park Hall in Oswestry, Shropshire. Afterward, he returned to his car and died from an apparent heart attack at the age of 75. His body was found in his car by maintenance staff the following morning.

=== Guide Cats for the Blind ===
Barker also wrote a poem called Guide Cats for the Blind which later became the title track of a double fundraising CD for the British Computer Association of the Blind (BCAB). The Association runs a program called EyeT4all, which aims to make computers accessible to people who are blind or visually impaired. Barker also agreed to the recording of a series of albums. Over £40,000 has been raised.

Five "Guide Cats" albums have been produced, Guide Cats for the Blind, Missing Persians File, Top Cat, White Tie and Tails, Cat Nav and Herding Cats. The CDs contain performances of Barker's poems by members of the folk world such as June Tabor, Martin Carthy, Steve Tilston, Mike Harding and Tom Paxton and well known figures including Jimmy Young, Nicholas Parsons, Brian Perkins, Terry Wogan, Nicky Campbell, Robert Lindsay, Prunella Scales and Andrew Sachs.

== Books ==
- Airedale
- Alexander Greyhound Bell
- Alsatians to Crewe
- Bark Odes
- Bark to Front
- The Beagle has Landed
- Beagles, Bangles and Beads
- Beyond Our Cairn
- The Boogie Woogie Beagle Boy from Company B
- Borzoi Ballet
- The Borzoi's Back in Town
- The Boxer Rebellion
- Break the Mole
- Collieflowers
- Corgasm
- Corgi and Bess
- Dachshunds With Erections Can't Climb Stairs
- Dog Byte
- Dog Ends
- Dog Gone
- Dog Only Nose
- Doggerel
- The English Book of Penguin Folk Songs
- Extra Terrierestrial
- Fetlar
- Get a Dog and Barker Yourself
- The Green Eye of the Little Yellow Dog
- Her Master's Book
- The Hound of Music
- The Hound of the Basketballs
- I Camel, I Saw, I Conker
- I Hear the Sound of Distant Plums
- Illegal Annual
- Irritable Bow-Wow Syndrome
- Jack Spaniel's
- King Charles Spaniel
- Labrador Rigby
- Lady & the Trampoline
- Llandrindod and One Dalmatians
- The Mabidogion
- Man and Doberman
- Mastiff Central
- Medlock Delta Blues
- Morocco and Things
- Mrs. Ack Royd's Again
- Mrs. Ackroyd's Diary
- O Camel Ye Faithful
- The Official Retriever
- Paws for Thought
- Pekinese Up Mother Brown
- Pup Yours
- A Quite Short Goat and a Pink Dalmatian
- Red Setters in the Sunset
- Reign of Terrier
- Rover the Hills and Far Away
- Rover the Rainbow
- Roverdance: The Poems
- Royders of the Lost Ack
- Sitting with My Dog on Display
- Something to Sniff At
- Songs for Swingin' Tails
- Spaniel in the Lion's Den
- Spencer's Dog Rover
- The First Mutt is the Cheapest
- The Stones of Callanish
- The Collar Purple
- The Mrs Ackroyd Occasional Table Book
- The Mrs Ackroyd Periodic Table Book
- The Mrs Ackroyd Bird Table Book
- The Ridgeback of Notre Dame
- A Tail of Two Setters
- Upper Cruft
- Vincent Van Dogh
- Viva a Spaniel
- Vodabone
- Waiting for Dogot
- Werneth Willie Ackroyd
- Wolfhound Amadeus Mozart
- 101 Damnatians

== Albums ==
- A Cardi and Bloke
- Airs of the Dog
- An Infinite Number of Occasional Tables
- Arovertherapy
- Dark Side of the Mongrel
- Dog 017 Yelp!
- Dogologues
- Earwigo
- Gnus & Roses
- Guide Cats for the Blind
- The Mrs. Ackroyd Rock'n'Roll Show
- Mrs. Ackroyd: Superstar!
- Oranges & Lemmings
- Probably the Best Album Ever Made by Anybody in Our Street
- Some Love
- The Missing Persians File
- The Stones of Callanish
- The War on Terrier
- Top Cat, White Tie and Tails
- Tubular Dogs
- Twilight of the Dogs
- Up the Creek without a Poodle
- The Wings of Butterflies
- Yelp!
