= Towersey Festival =

Annual music festival in England

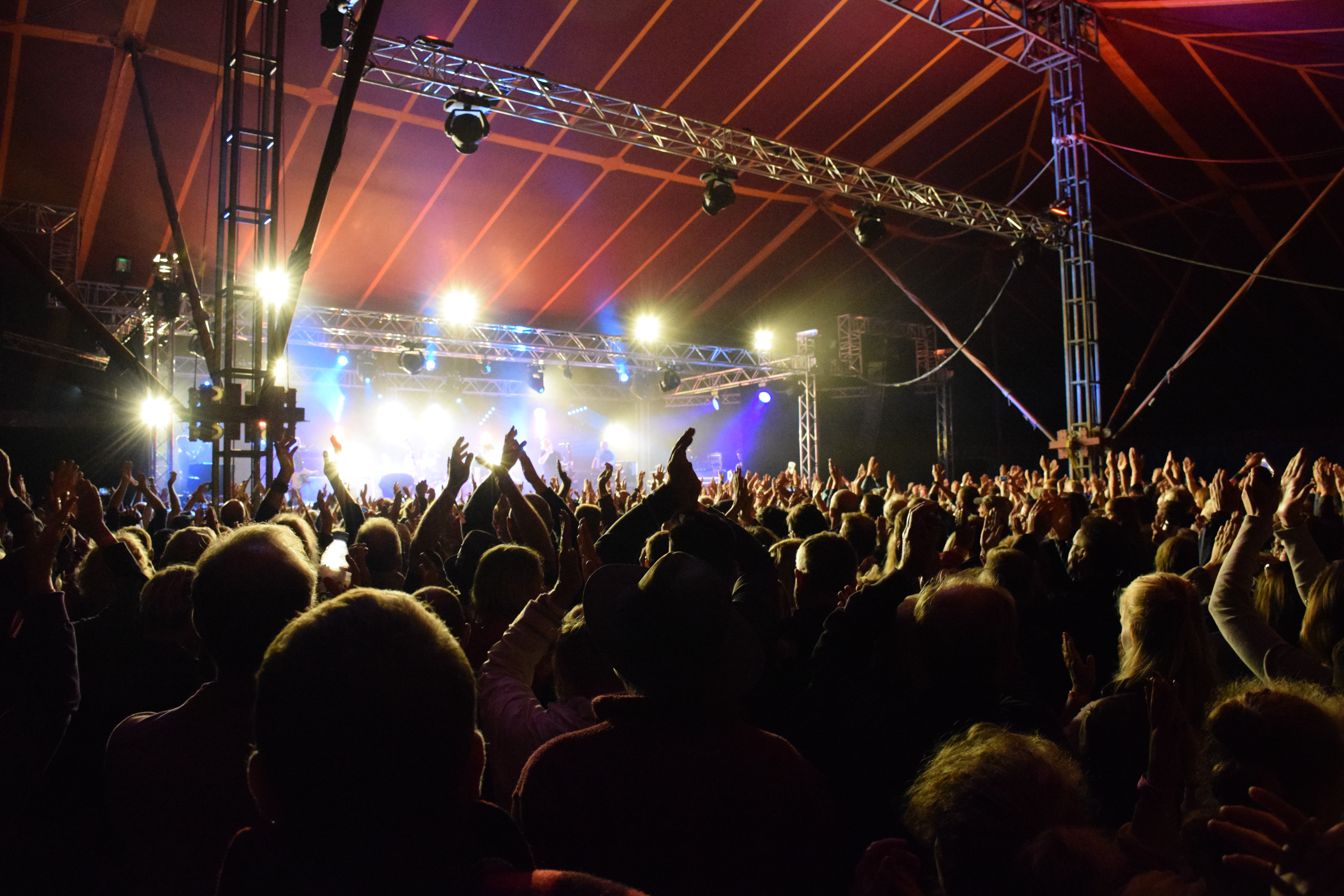
- Venue 65, Towersey 2018
- Frequency: Annually
- Locations: Claydon Estate, near Middle Claydon, Buckinghamshire, England
- Inaugurated: 1965
- Most recent: 2024
- Attendance: c. 10,000
- Website: towerseyfestival.com

Towersey Festival was an annual festival of folk, world music and traditional dance, previously held in the village of Towersey, relocated to neighbouring Thame in Oxfordshire, England through 2019. It moved to the Claydon Estate, near Middle Claydon in Buckinghamshire, from 2020.

The festival took place every August bank holiday weekend from its founding in 1965 until 2024, when rising costs and post-pandemic financial pressures forced its closure after 60 years as the United Kingdom's longest-running independent music festival.

== History ==
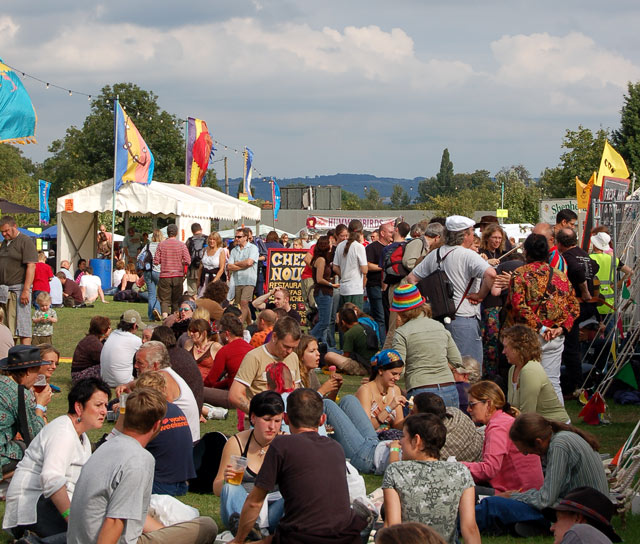
Festivalgoers at Towersey Festival 2006

The festival set out as a fundraising event to rescue the decaying Towersey Village Memorial Hall – a building that commemorated the 14 men who had lost their lives in the First World War. In that first year (1965), it was a one-day village fete with morris dancing and a folk singing session in the pub barn. Among the organisers were two local residents: folk music enthusiast Denis Manners, and the composer and conductor Vilém Tauský. Its success can be measured by the money raised, the enjoyment of the day by the village residents and visitors, and by the fact that, in the following year, a three-day event was held.

The festival attracts approximately 10,000 people each year although the 2004 event (26 to 30 August) attracted much higher numbers than ever before. This is partly due to that year being the festival's 40th anniversary.

The 40th Ruby festival ran from 26 to 30 August 2004 and featured appearances from Rory McLeod, Flook and Martin Simpson.

The venues/ stages in which festival activities take place include The Big Club (formerly known as the Concert Tent); The Festival Dance House (FDH); The Festival Green (formerly known as The Market Square and the Arena); and Venue 65. Other features include The Den (for storytelling and spoken word), the craft tent and the craft market, Creative Quarter and dedicated areas for children (5-11yrs) and youth (11yrs+).

Regular performers at Towersey include Roy Bailey and Les Barker. The latter made a live recording there in 1995 while Roy released Live at Towersey Festival 2015 during 2016. A Towersey Festival Patron, Roy performed at the very first festival, and his annual Monday afternoon concerts are greeted by capacity crowds. The Unthanks and John Spiers and Jon Boden had successful performances there in their early careers, while Eliza Carthy played her first solo show at the festival. Eliza said: "Towersey gave me my first ever solo gig ... and one of the most memorable gigs of my life; a Chipolata 5 gig so full and rowdy that they had to take the sides of the marquee down."

Discussing the festival's appeal and longevity, Roy Bailey stated: “Children play safely and many lifelong friendships have been developed here. People met here and got married here and generations of families return every year.”

The festival's 50th anniversary in 2014 was headlined by Richard Thompson. The anniversary was also marked by the publication of a book, Towersey Festival: 50 Years In The Making which explored the 50-year history of the festival, from its inception to present day.

Since 2015, the festival has been based at Thame Showground.

2019 saw the festival present an exhibition at Thame Museum entitled Capturing Towersey: Festival Photographs By Phil Sofer - a collection of images shot at the festival by the official festival photographer, Phil Sofer.

In April 2020 it was announced that the Towersey Festival would not go ahead in that year, due to the ongoing COVID-19 pandemic. The event was postponed until August Bank Holiday 2021.

It was announced in May 2024 that that year's festival would be the last, after 60 years. A new "Found Festival" was established in 2025 by the same team that previously led Towersey, and runs annually with the 2026 headliners being Stornoway and This Is The Kit.

== Recent headliners ==
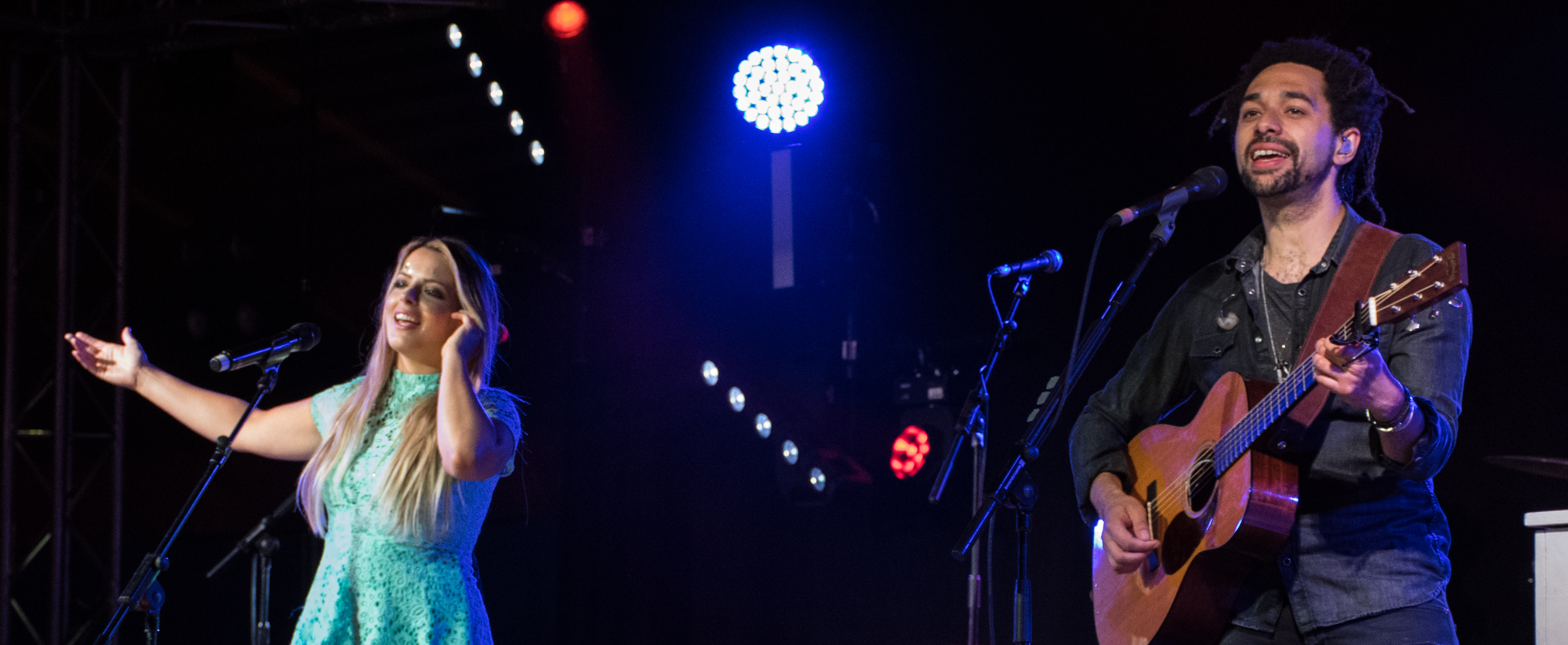
The Shires at Towersey 2018

2012: The South, Bellowhead, Nic Jones, Edward II, Kathryn Tickell, The Albion Band

2013: The Unthanks, Show Of Hands, Home Service, Eliza and Martin Carthy, The Blockheads

2014: Topic Records 75th Anniversary Concert (featuring Norma Waterson, Eliza Carthy, Martin Carthy and guests), The Bootleg Beatles, Richard Thompson, Seth Lakeman, Lau, Conservatoire Folk Ensemble

2015: Bellowhead, Stornoway, Joan Armatrading, Show Of Hands, Simpson Cutting and Kerr

2016: Billy Bragg, Kate Rusby, The Wonder Stuff, Ukulele Orchestra of Great Britain, 9 Bach, Midge Ure, Tom Robinson, The Young'Uns

2017: Jon Boden, KT Tunstall, Eliza Carthy and The Wayward Band, Newton Faulkner, Show Of Hands, Lindisfarne, Demon Barbers XL, Coope Boyes and Simpson

2018: The Shires, The Proclaimers, Richard Thompson Electric Trio, Beth Orton, Big Country, Sharon Shannon Band, Fisherman's Friends, Blair Dunlop, Brighouse and Rastrick Brass Band, Peter Knight and John Spiers

2019: The Selecter, Hothouse Flowers, Newton Faulkner, Seth Lakeman, From The Jam, The Unthanks, Steve Harley, Oysterband, The Bar-Steward Sons of Val Doonican and a special tribute to Roy Bailey with Tom Robinson, Martin Simpson and guests.

== Towersey traditions ==
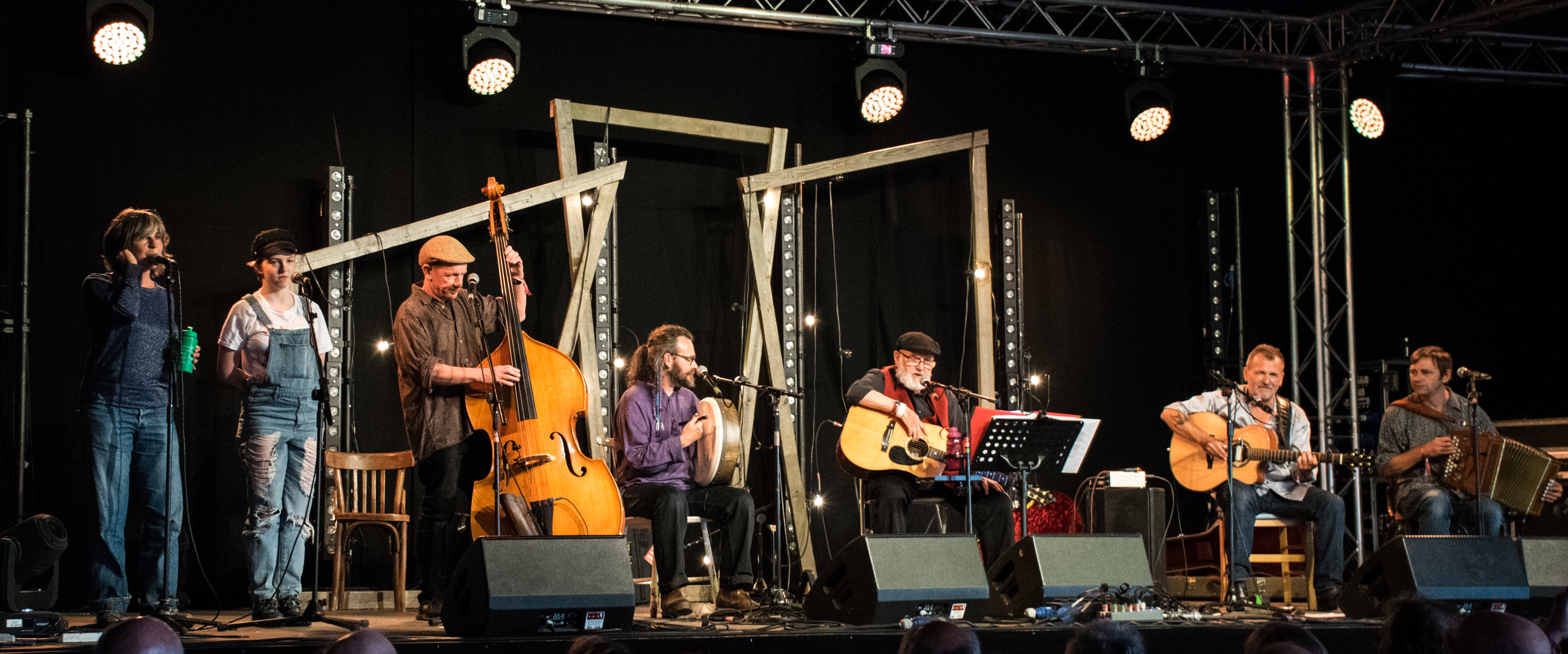
Roy Bailey and guests performing at his last Towersey Festival in 2018.

Roy Bailey's Monday afternoon concert, featuring invited guests, was a Towersey tradition until Bailey's death in 2018. For the 2019 festival, the organisers announced a celebration of Bailey's life, featuring many of the artists who had played as guests at his concerts.

The festival traditionally ends with a Festival Finale singalong in Venue 65, with the closing act leading the audience in a rendition of The Beatles' "Hey Jude".

Monday evening also sees the festival's traditional Lantern Parade. The lanterns are made by members of the audience over the duration of the festival.

In a tradition dating to 1990, many men wear dresses on the last night of the festival. This began as a hen party for a Towersey regular, where the bride agreed that, due to the lack of female friends attending, men could attend if they dressed appropriately. The following year, the bride and groom held a Sunday afternoon cocktail party, before the Sunday evening session in the Barn, with guests asked to wear their wedding outfits. In time, this evolved into 'Dress Up Sunday'. The bride still attends the festival regularly as a steward.

== Towersey releases ==
The festival has released three compilation albums to date. The first was released in 1969, featuring acts recorded live at the 1968 festival, while the next two included (mostly) studio recordings of artists due to appear at the festival that year, and were released via digital distribution platform NoiseTrade.

- Festival at Towersey (Zeus 1969), 10-track vinyl album featuring John Kirkpatrick, The Yetties, Bob Grant and John Graham, Brian Perrett and Dennis Manners.
- Towersey Festival 2015 (NoiseTrade, 2015), free 18 track digital download featuring Kim Churchill, Keston Cobblers' Club, Chris While and Julie matthews, Ninebarrow, The Askew Sisters, Roy Bailey Martin Simpson and Andy Cutting
- Towersey Festival 2016 (NoiseTrade, 2016), free 18 track digital download featuring The Young'uns, Nizlopi, Rory McLeod, Roy Bailey, The Urban Folk Quartet
