= Gentle Men =

1997 English folk album

Studio album by Roy Bailey, Vera Coomans, Robb Johnson, Koen De Cauter and the Golden Serenaders
- Released: 1997
- Recorded: 27–29 August 1997
- Genre: Folk
- Length: tbc
- Label: Irregular Records
- Producer: Piet Chielens

Roy Bailey chronology
| Rhythm & Reds (1994) | Gentle Men (1997) | Past Masters (1998) |

Robb Johnson chronology
| Invisible People (1997) | Gentle Men (1997) | Yeah Yeah Yeah: So Far So Good 1991-1998 (1998) |

Gentle Men is an album released in 1997 by English folk singers Roy Bailey and Robb Johnson in collaboration with Belgian singer Vera Coomans and Belgian jazz band Koen De Cauter and the Golden Serenaders. The album takes the form of a song cycle inspired by the experiences of Johnson's grandfathers during the First World War, and was released as part of the Vredesconcerten Passendale (Paschendale Peace Concerts) series.

== Concept ==
Johnson based the songs on the album around the experiences of his two grandfathers at the Ypres Salient in 1917 and used official histories and family memories in his research. According to the album's sleevenotes, Johnson's paternal grandfather, Ernest Isaac Johnson, was an apprentice glassblower and amateur musician, who served as a bandsman in the Royal Army Medical Corps from 1915 until the conclusion of the war in 1918. His maternal grandfather, Henry Robert Jenner, enlisted despite being underage and served with the Post Office Rifles. When his true age was discovered, he was allocated duties away from the frontline, but was eventually sent back to the trenches. Despite being affected by a mustard gas attack, he also survived the war.

== Credits ==
According to the sleevenotes, Bailey, Johnson and Coomans all contribute lead vocals, and Johnson also plays guitar and whistle. Koen De Cauter plays saxophone, guitar and clarinet, and the Golden Serenaders band also includes Hendrik Braeckman on guitar, Dajo De Cauter on double bass, Myrdhin De Cauter on clarinet, Jan De Coninck on trumpet, Philip Hoessen on accordion and Willy Seeuws on drums. Piet Chielens produced the album, which was recorded and mixed by Rudy Dekeyzer. All songs were written by Johnson and arranged by De Cauter and his band.

== Reception ==
Folk music magazine The Living Tradition described the songs as "emotive, thought provoking and carry[ing] great depth and weight." Allmusic described the songs as "moving" and stated that it was one of the best albums of Johnson's career. Mojo named the album Folk Album of the Month, and The Daily Telegraph chose it as Folk Album of the Year.

== Track listing ==
Roy Bailey

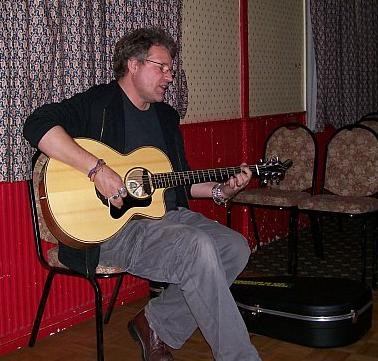
Robb Johnson

=== Disc One ===
| # | Title | Vocalist | Length |
|---|---|---|---|
| 1 | Grandfathers | Johnson | 2:35 |
| 2 | A Gentleman Always Wants Horses | Bailey | 4:35 |
| 3 | Three Brothers | Bailey | 3:48 |
| 4 | And Then the Trumpet Sounded | Coomans | 2:46 |
| 5 | Deeper Than Dugouts | Coomans | 3:57 |
| 6 | R.S.M. Schofield Is My Shepherd | Bailey | 3:38 |
| 7 | I Played for Kitchener | Johnson | 2:23 |
| 8 | At the Mercy of the Guns | Bailey | 2:52 |
| 9 | A Garden | Coomans | 3:08 |
| 10 | Bloody Medals | Bailey | 3:48 |
| 11 | Soldier On | Bailey | 2:40 |
| 12 | Empty Chair | Coomans | 2:56 |

=== Disc Two ===
| # | Title | Vocalist | Length |
|---|---|---|---|
| 1 | Noni and His Golden Serenaders | Johnson | 4:10 |
| 2 | The Boy of My Dreams | Coomans | 2:32 |
| 3 | When Harry Took Me to See Ypres | Coomans | 3:56 |
| 4 | Sweet Dreams | Bailey | 3:29 |
| 5 | The Silence of the Salient | Johnson | 4:31 |
| 6 | Whistle | Bailey | 3:18 |
| 7 | The Music from Between the Wars | Bailey | 4:57 |
| 8 | Nobody's Enemy | Johnson | 4:17 |
| 9 | The German Exchange | Johnson | 3:14 |
| 10 | Hindsight | Bailey | 1:58 |
| 11 | Dead Man's Pennies | Coomans | 4:13 |
| 12 | Candles in the Rain | Johnson | 2:55 |
| 13 | Making the Gardens Grow | Johnson | 3:51 |

In 2000 Johnson performed the songs from the album at a Remembrance Day concert in Worcester with a band which included Russell Churney. He also re-recorded the song "When Harry Took Me To See Ypres", providing the lead vocals himself, on his 2005 album A Beginner's Guide.
