= Songs of Life from a Dying British Empire =

Songs of Life from a Dying British Empire is a 1981 album by British folk singers Leon Rosselson and Roy Bailey. Initially released by Paredon Records, it was later donated to the Smithsonian Folkways archive.

== Track listing ==
| No. | Title | Length |
|---|---|---|
| 1. | "School Taught Me/The Street of London" | 2:28 |
| 2. | "Time and Motion Study" | 1:09 |
| 3. | "I Just Can't Wait" | 4:46 |
| 4. | "Coats Off for Britain" | 5:38 |
| 5. | "High in Control Rooms" | 0:38 |
| 6. | "The Ant and the Grasshopper" | 2:41 |
| 7. | "The Rose of York" | 3:29 |
| 8. | "The World Turned Upside Down" | 6:45 |
| 9. | "They're Going to Build a Motorway" | 3:17 |
| 10. | "Punch and Judy Man" | 3:55 |
| 11. | "Perspectives" | 3:01 |
| 12. | "Plan (That's Not the Way It's Got to Be)" | 3:48 |
