= Acoustically Driven =

2001 live album by Uriah Heep

- Cover art by Roger Dean

Video by Uriah Heep
- Released: 12 June 2001
- Recorded: 9 December 2000
- Venue: Mermaid Theatre, London, UK
- Genre: Acoustic rock, progressive rock
- Length: 75:07
- Label: Classic Rock Legends
- Producer: Pip Williams

Uriah Heep video chronology
The Legend Continues... A Celebration of Thirty Years in Rock (2000)	Acoustically Driven (2001)	Moscow and Beyond (2002)

Acoustically Driven

Live album by Uriah Heep
- Released: 12 June 2001
- Recorded: 9 December 2000
- Venue: Mermaid Theatre, London
- Genre: Acoustic rock, progressive rock
- Length: 75:07
- Label: Phantom
- Producer: Pip Williams

Uriah Heep live chronology
Future Echoes of the Past (2001)	Acoustically Driven (2001)	Electrically Driven (2001)

Acoustically Driven is a live video released in VHS and DVD format by British rock band Uriah Heep in 2001. The video was shot live with an orchestra and choir. It was published in a two disc set with a DVD of the live concert.

== Track listings ==
1. "Introduction" – 0:47
2. "Why Did You Go?" – 3:59
3. "The Easy Road" – 2:41
4. "Echoes in the Dark" – 4:44
5. "Come Back to Me" – 4:40
6. "Cross That Line" – 5:56
7. "The Golden Palace" – 8:17
8. "The Shadows and the Wind" – 4:30
9. "Wonderworld" – 4:33
10. "Different World" – 5:03
11. "Circus" – 4.21
12. "Blind Eye" – 3:37
13. "Traveller in Time" – 2:50
14. "More Fool You" – 3:30
15. "Lady in Black" – 6:15
16. "Medley: The Wizard / Paradise / Circle of Hands" – 9:24

== Personnel ==
Uriah Heep

- Mick Box – guitar, backing vocals
- Lee Kerslake – drums, backing vocals
- Trevor Bolder – bass guitar, backing vocals
- Phil Lanzon – keyboards, backing vocals, string arrangements
- Bernie Shaw – lead vocals

Additional musicians

- Ian Anderson – flute on "Circus" and "Blind Eye"
- The Uriah Heep Classic Rock Music Ensemble:
  - Liz Chi Yen Liew – first violin
  - Sarah Chi Liew – second violin
  - Saskia Tomkins – viola
  - Pauline Kirke – cello
- Steafan Hannigan – uilleann pipes and percussion
- Melvin Duffy – pedal steel and slide guitar
- Pip Williams – additional acoustic guitar on "Lady in Black", strings arrangements
- Kim Chandler – flute on "The Easy Road", "The Golden Palace" and "More Fool You", backing vocals
- Emma Robbins – backing vocals
- Billie Godfrey – backing vocals
