= Roy Bailey (folk singer) =

Roy Bailey MBE
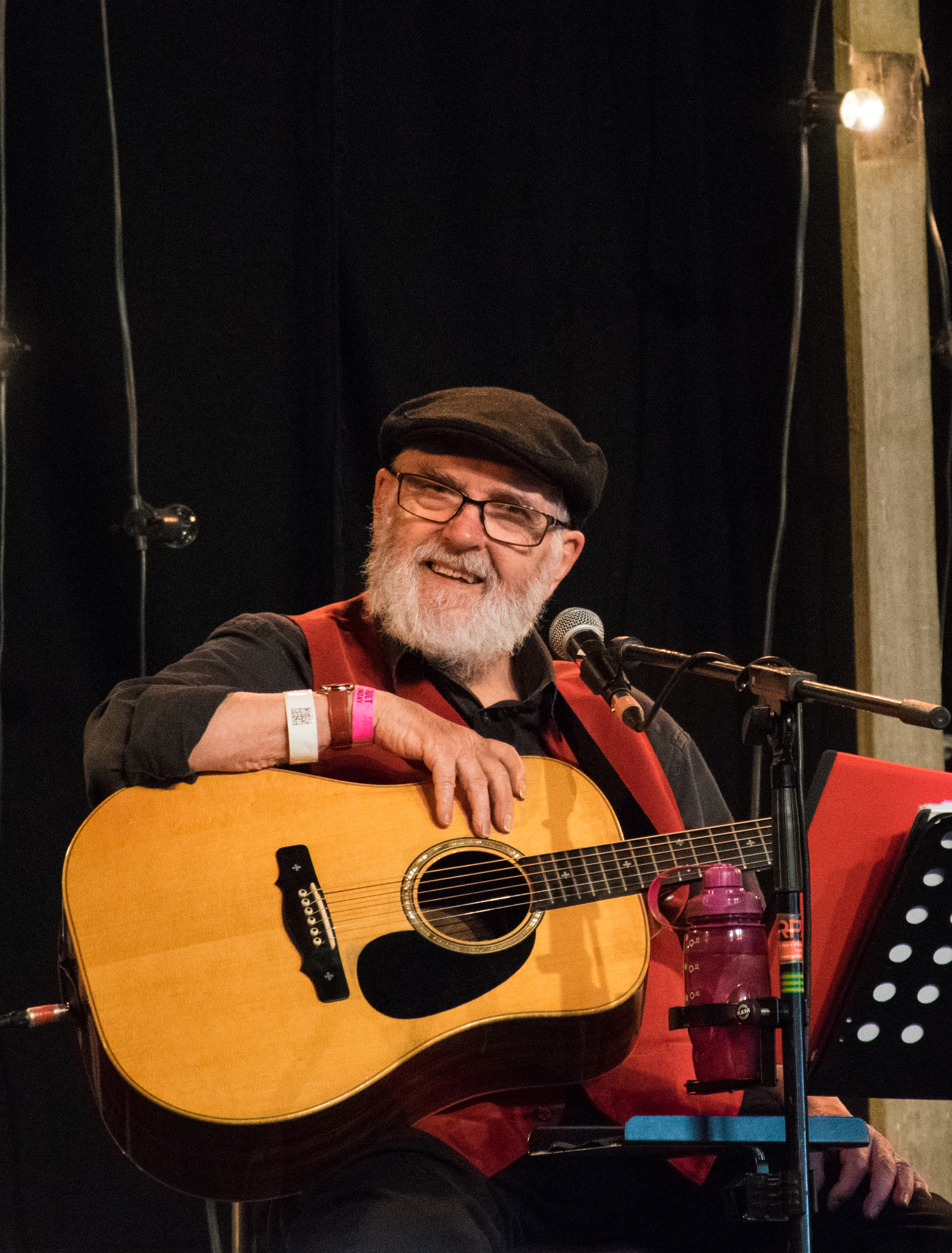
- Roy Bailey at Towersey Festival, 2018

Background information
- Born: 20 October 1935; London, England
- Died: 20 November 2018 (aged 83) Sheffield, England
- Genres: Folk
- Occupations: Singer, songwriter
- Instruments: Vocals, guitar
- Label: Fuse
- Website: (closed)

Roy Bailey at Bromyard Folk Festival, 2007

Roy Bailey, MBE (20 October 1935 – 20 November 2018) was an English sociologist and folk singer. Colin Irwin from the music magazine Mojo said Bailey represented "the very soul of folk's working class ideals... a triumphal homage to the grass roots folk scene as a radical alternative to the mainstream music industry."

== Biography ==
Bailey began his musical career in a skiffle band in 1958, and later joined folk supergroup the Three City Four featuring Leon Rosselson, as a replacement for Martin Carthy. His first solo album was released in 1971.

He performed a number of songs by the American singer-songwriter Si Kahn and was also renowned as a singer of children's songs, often using material written by his old partner Leon Rosselson. Oats & Beans & Kangaroos is an album of children's songs performed by Roy & Val Bailey with Leon Rosselson.

Bailey worked with Robb Johnson and others on the award-winning Gentle Men album, released in 1997 and re-recorded and released in 2013.

In 2003, Bailey and Tony Benn were awarded "Best Live Act" at the BBC Radio 2 Folk Awards for their programme Writing on the Wall, later an album. Tony Benn cited Roy Bailey as "the greatest socialist folk singer of his generation."

In the 2000 Honours List, he received the MBE for Services to Folk Music.

On 23 August 2006, he returned his MBE insignia in protest at the British government's foreign policy with regard to Lebanon and the Palestinian territories.

He contributed vocals to Chumbawamba's 2008 album The Boy Bands Have Won, on the track "Word Bomber", a song about the London suicide attacks in 2005. He also joined the band on stage to sing the song, on their farewell Leeds show in October 2012.

In 2016, Roy released his first live album, Live at Towersey Festival 2015, which was recorded in secret at the festival and featured guest appearances from Martin Simpson and Andy Cutting. The album contained songs written by Si Kahn, Bob Dylan, Tom Waits, John Tams, Robb Johnson and others. Roy appeared at the very first Towersey Festival in 1965 and his well established Monday afternoon concert as patron regularly drew a crowd of around 1000.

Roy Bailey was an Emeritus Professor of Social Studies at Sheffield Hallam University. He was also the patron of Towersey Village Festival, Shepley Spring Festival and the Music on the Marr Festival based in the village of Castle Carrock, Cumbria. He was the father-in-law of Martin Simpson, a singer and guitarist, whose wife Kit is Bailey's daughter.

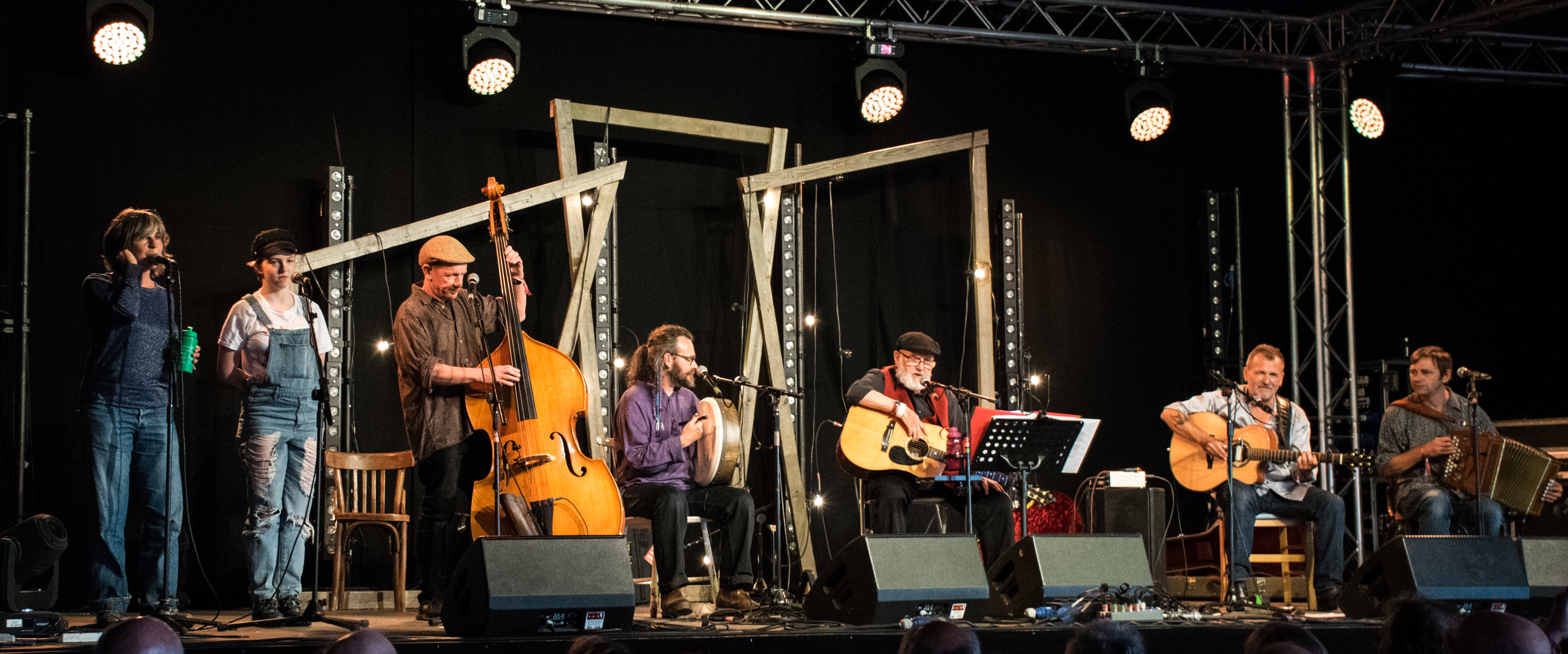
Performing his final Monday afternoon concert at Towersey Festival 2018, with a band including Martin Simpson, Andy Cutting, Marc Block, Kit Bailey and Max Simpson

Having struggled with heart failure for over 30 years, Bailey died on 20 November 2018 in St Luke's Hospice, Sheffield. A posthumous album was released in late 2020 entitled Roy Bailey Remembered, featuring performances from Nancy Kerr and James Fagan, The Wilsons and The Spooky Men's Chorale. This was recorded at Towersey Folk Festival 2019 and launched as an album using crowd funding.

== Discography ==
=== Albums ===
- Smoke and Dust Where the Heart Should Have Been, CBS 1965 (as part of the Three City Four) [most of the album reissued 2010]
- Oats & Beans & Kangaroos, Fontana Records, SFL13061, 1968 (with Leon Rosselson) [children's songs]
- Roy Bailey, Trailer Records, LER 3021, 1971
- That's Not The Way It's Got To Be, Fuse Records, CF 251, 1975 (with Leon Rosselson)
- Love, Loneliness & Laundry, Fuse, CF, 1976 (with Leon Rosselson)
- New Bell Wake, Fuse, CF262, 1977
- If I Knew Who the Enemy Was, CF284, 1979 (with Leon Rosselson)
- Songs of Life from a Dying British Empire, Paredon, 1981 (with Leon Rosselson) [this being a US re-issue of That's Not The Way It's Got To Be]
- Hard Times, Fuse, CF382, 1982
- Freedom Peacefully, Fuse, CF386, 1986
- Leaves From a Tree, Fuse, CF394, 1988
- Why Does It Have To Be Me?, Fuse, CF396, 1989 [children's songs]
- Never Leave A Story Unsung, Fuse, CFCD398, 1991
- What You Do With What You've Got, Fuse, CFCD399, 1992 [compilation of 1975–1991 material]
- Business As Usual, Fuse, CFCD400, 1994
- Rhythm & Reds, Musikfolk, MFO512, 1994 [as Band of Hope – with Martin Carthy, Dave Swarbrick & John Kirkpatrick]
- New Directions in the Old, Fuse, CFCD402, 1999
- New Bell Wake, Fuse, CFCD262, 1999
- Gentle Men, Irregular Records, 1998 (with Robb Johnson)
- Past Masters, Fuse, CFCD403, 1998
- Coda, Fuse, CFCD, 2000
- Up the Wooden Hill, Fuse, CFCD170201, 2002 [children's songs]
- Writing on the Wall, Fuse, CFCD405, 2004 (with Tony Benn)
- Sit Down and Sing, Fuse CFCD406 2005
- Below the Radar, Fuse, CFCD407, 2009
- Tomorrow, Fuse, CFCD408, 2010 [children's songs]
- Stories EP, Fuse, Digital release only, 2014
- Live at Towersey Festival 2015, Fuse, CFCD410, 2016
- Roy Bailey: Remembered.

== See also ==
- Political Song Network
