= The Ghost of Love =

Studio album by Robb Johnson and the Irregulars
- Released: 30 November 2009
- Recorded: 2009
- Genre: Folk-rock
- Label: Irregular Records

Robb Johnson chronology
Margaret Thatcher: My Part in her Downfall - Deluxe (2009)	The Ghost of Love (2009)

The Ghost of Love is an album released in November 2009 by English folk-rock singer Robb Johnson and his band The Irregulars. The album takes the form of a song cycle based on a woman called Mary and the events that occur in her life at Christmas over various years.

== Concept ==
A number of the songs had appeared sporadically on earlier albums by Johnson, dating back to Overnight in 1991, although the recordings presented on the album are all new. The songs were inspired by Johnson's memories of living in the London borough of Hounslow, where he was a resident for around fifty years, ranging from childhood memories of watching Brentford F.C. with his father to more modern incidents. One song, "Father Christmas Down Hounslow High Street" was inspired by a Christmas parade to which he took his own children, which featured Noddy and some "camp pirates". The storyline of the album centres on Mary, from nearby Feltham, her children, and her on-off boyfriend Gary, a carpenter. Johnson based the character of Mary on a girl he had taught while working as a schoolteacher, who had a child at a young age. Johnson and the band also toured in support of the album, combining the concert with a children's songs workshop.

== Critical reception ==
Writing in The Guardian, Robin Denselow called the album "bleak but unexpectedly poignant" and "thoughtful [and] well-observed" and said it offered proof that Johnson was "an English original".

== Credits ==
Johnson plays guitar on the album and sings, accompanied by John Forrester on bass guitar, Charlie Waygood on drums, Naomy Browton on cello, Tim Walker on brass, and Roger Watson on melodeon. Johnson's two young sons, Hari and Arvin, provided background vocals for the track "Poundshop Christmas".

== Track listing ==
1. "Fairytales in Feltham"
2. "Rehoused in Hounslow"
3. "Jubilee Gardens"
4. "Father Christmas Down Hounslow High Street"
5. "Wooden Snowmen"
6. "Meanwhile, On Planet Earth"
7. "Crisis"
8. "Poundshop Christmas"
9. "Magic Pockets"
10. "The Ghost of Love"
11. "Motorcycle Diary"
12. "The Midnight Clear"
