= The Triumph of Hope Over Experience =

Studio album by Robb Johnson
- Released: 2002
- Recorded: September–December 2001, Running Frog Music, Windsor, UK
- Length: 59:10
- Label: Irregular Records

"The Triumph of Hope Over Experience" is an album by Robb Johnson released in 2002.

== Track listing ==
All tracks composed by Robb Johnson

1. "Passport, Tickets and Guitar" – 5:03
2. "One Broadstairs Morning" – 4:10
3. "Life is Football" – 4:49
4. "When the Swing Began to Swing" – 3:42
5. "Soho Heart" – 6:20
6. "Happy Birthday, General" – 3:39
7. "Supporting Chumbawamba" – 5:22
8. "London on Sea" – 5:01
9. "This Song is a Rose" – 5:34
10. "Hope Street, Tomorrow Afternoon" – 4:29
11. "You and This City" – 4:58
12. "Sunlight and Snow" – 5:04
13. bonus track – 1:51

== Personnel ==
=== Musicians ===
- Robb Johnson - vocals, guitar
- Barb Jungr - vocals (tracks 5, 10–11)
- Mauricio Venegas-Astorga - vocals (track 6), guitar (track 11), flute (track 6), panpipes (track 6), percussion (track 3)
- Miranda Sykes - vocals (tracks 2–3, 8–10), bass guitar (tracks 2–3, 9–11), double bass (tracks 1, 5, 8, 12)
- Russell Churney - piano (tracks 2, 5, 8, 11)
- John Sykes - vocals (track 2), melodeon (track 2)
- Rachel Pantin - violin (track 8)
- Saskia Tomkins - violin (tracks 1, 4, 9–10)
- Paul Mullineaux - drums (tracks 1–2, 9–11)
- "The Evening Star" - vocals (track 3)

=== Other personnel ===
- Robb Johnson - design, photography
- Meeta Johnson - photography
- Tony Warren - design
