= Leon Rosselson =

English songwriter (born 1934)

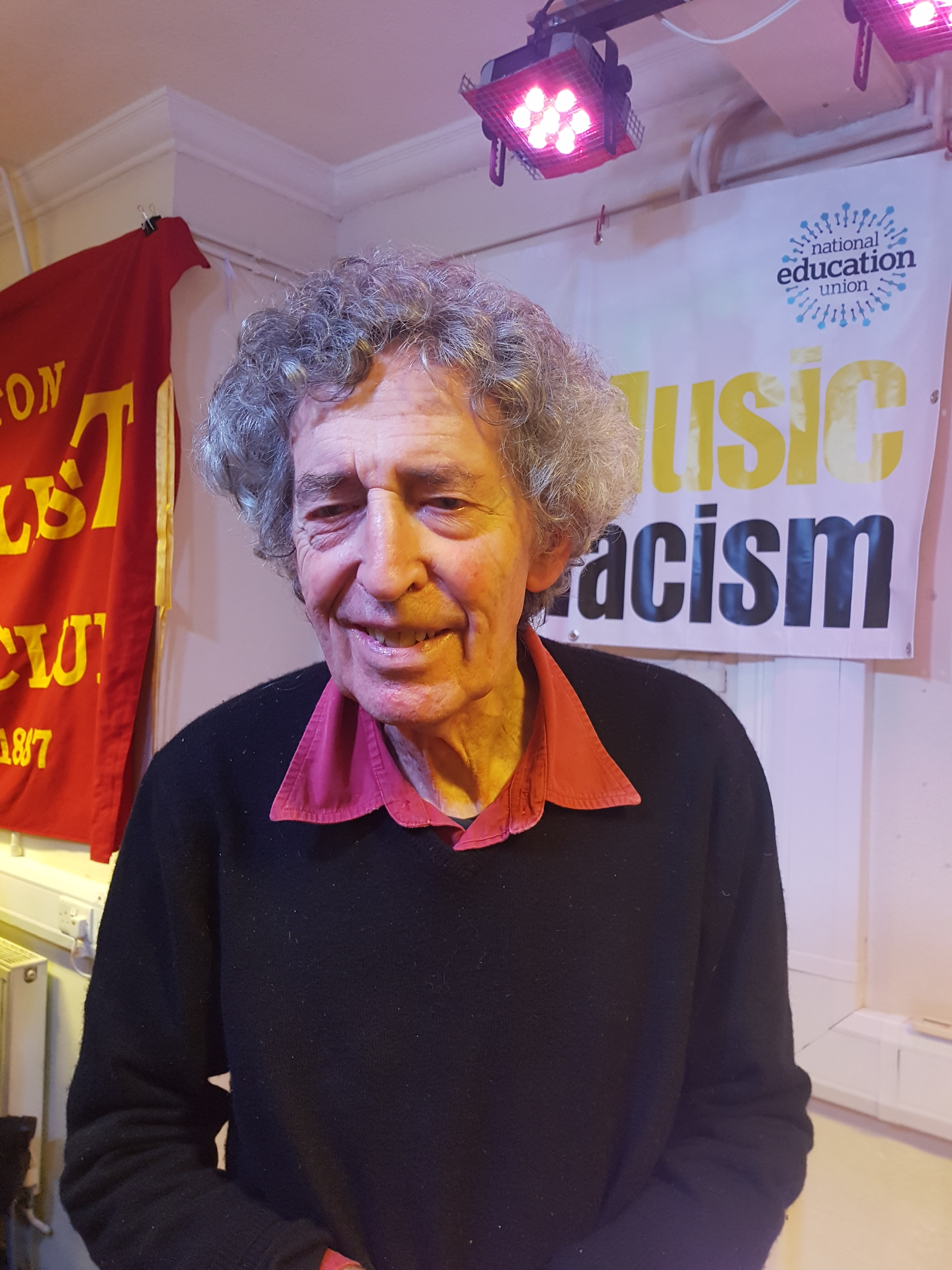
- Rosselson at the Bolton Socialist Club, November 2019
- Born: June 22, 1934 (age 92); Harrow, Middlesex, England
- Website: https://leonrosselson.co.uk/

Leon Rosselson (born 22 June 1934, Harrow, Middlesex, England) is an English songwriter and writer of children's books. After his early involvement in the folk music revival in Britain, he came to prominence, singing his own satirical songs, in the BBC's topical TV programme of the early 1960s, That Was The Week That Was. He toured Britain and abroad, singing mainly his own songs and accompanying himself with acoustic guitar.

In later years, he has published 17 children's books, the first of which, Rosa's Singing Grandfather, was shortlisted in 1991 for the Carnegie Medal.

He continues to write and perform his own songs, and to collaborate with other musicians and performers. Most of his material includes some sort of satirical content or elements of radical politics.

== Early life ==
Rosselson was born and brought up in North London, lived in Tufnell Park and attended Parliament Hill Grammar School. His Jewish parents came to England as refugees from the Russian Empire.

He studied at Fitzwilliam College, Cambridge University. In his teens and twenties he played competitive chess, including representing his school, county and university.

== Folk years ==
Rosselson got involved in folk music while at Cambridge University, joining the university folk club The St Lawrence Society, during which time he also started writing songs.

Rosselson joined the London Youth Choir, formed by John Hasted and Eric Winter, which went to a number of World Youth Festivals in the 1950s.

At the end of that decade, two Scotsmen, Robin Hall (1936–1998) and Jimmie Macgregor (born 1930), came to London and teamed up with Shirley Bland (Jimmie's wife) and Leon Rosselson to form a quartet called The Galliards. Rosselson played five string banjo and guitar and did most of the arrangements. Their repertoire consisted of folk songs. They made an EP and two LPs for Decca (Scottish Choice and A-Roving) and one LP for the American label, Monitor. They also made a single for Topic of the Dave Arkin/Earl Robinson song "The Ink Is Black". The group broke up in 1963.

In 1964, Rosselson joined Marian Mackenzie, Ralph Trainer and Martin Carthy (later replaced by Roy Bailey) in a group called The Three City Four. They concentrated on contemporary songs, including some of Rosselson's own, and made two LPs for Decca and for CBS.

== That Was the Week That Was ==
Britain's satire boom began on 24 November 1962 with the debut of a late-night Saturday television series called That Was the Week That Was, hosted by David Frost. It featured some of Rosselson's early satirical songs. The programme ran until 1963.

== Folk club singer ==
His song "Tim McGuire" (who loved to play with fire), written during this period, was the subject of a complaint from the Chairman of Staffordshire Fire Brigades when it was played a number of times on BBC radio. The BBC, however, refused to ban the song, despite the protests, because (they said) the pyromaniac does get caught in the end. An earlier recording, though, the Topic EP Songs for City Squares, was labelled 'for restricted listening only' by the BBC.

== With Roy Bailey ==
Hugga Mugga was released on the Leader label in 1971. Roy Bailey and Rosselson recorded That's Not The Way It's Got To Be in 1975. Two other collaborations followed, Love, Loneliness and Laundry (1977) and If I Knew Who the Enemy Was (1979). Rosselson also scripted two shows for performance with Roy Bailey and Frankie Armstrong: the anti-nuclear No Cause for Alarm and Love Loneliness and Laundry, about personal politics.

Billy Bragg took "The World Turned Upside Down" into the charts in 1985. Dick Gaughan has also performed Rosselson's music ("The World Turned Upside Down" and "Stand Up for Judas"). The Dubliners recorded Don't Get Married in 1987. Martin Carthy included a version of Rosselson's "Palaces of Gold", about the Aberfan disaster, on his 1976 album Crown of Horn and on various compilations. He commented:

Leon Rosselson wrote Palaces of Gold when the news came out about the pit heap disaster at Aberfan and feelings that had been floating around for a very long time overflowed.

== Big Red Songs ==
The original Big Red Songbook, a collection of socialist songs, came out in 1977. Rosselson produced a new collection The New Big Red Songbook in 2003.

== Spycatcher ==
In 1987, three Law Lords declared that Peter Wright's book Spycatcher could not be published in Britain nor could any of it be quoted in the media. Rosselson set out to break the law. He spent two days reading it, then encapsulated it and quoted from it in a specially written song, Ballad of a Spycatcher, which was published in the British weekly New Statesman. A single of it, with backing from Billy Bragg and the Oysterband, was released and started to get radio play, including by Simon Bates on the BBC pop music channel Radio 1. He appeared to expect a police raid or court order. In the event, nothing happened. In Rosselson's words: "So much for subversive intentions." It reached number 7 in the NME indie singles charts.

== Children's writer ==
Rosselson has published 17 children's books. His first book, Rosa's Singing Grandfather, published by Puffin, was shortlisted in 1991 for the Carnegie Medal.

In his most recent novel, Home is a Place Called Nowhere (OUP), Rosselson writes about the experience of being a refugee.

== Discography ==
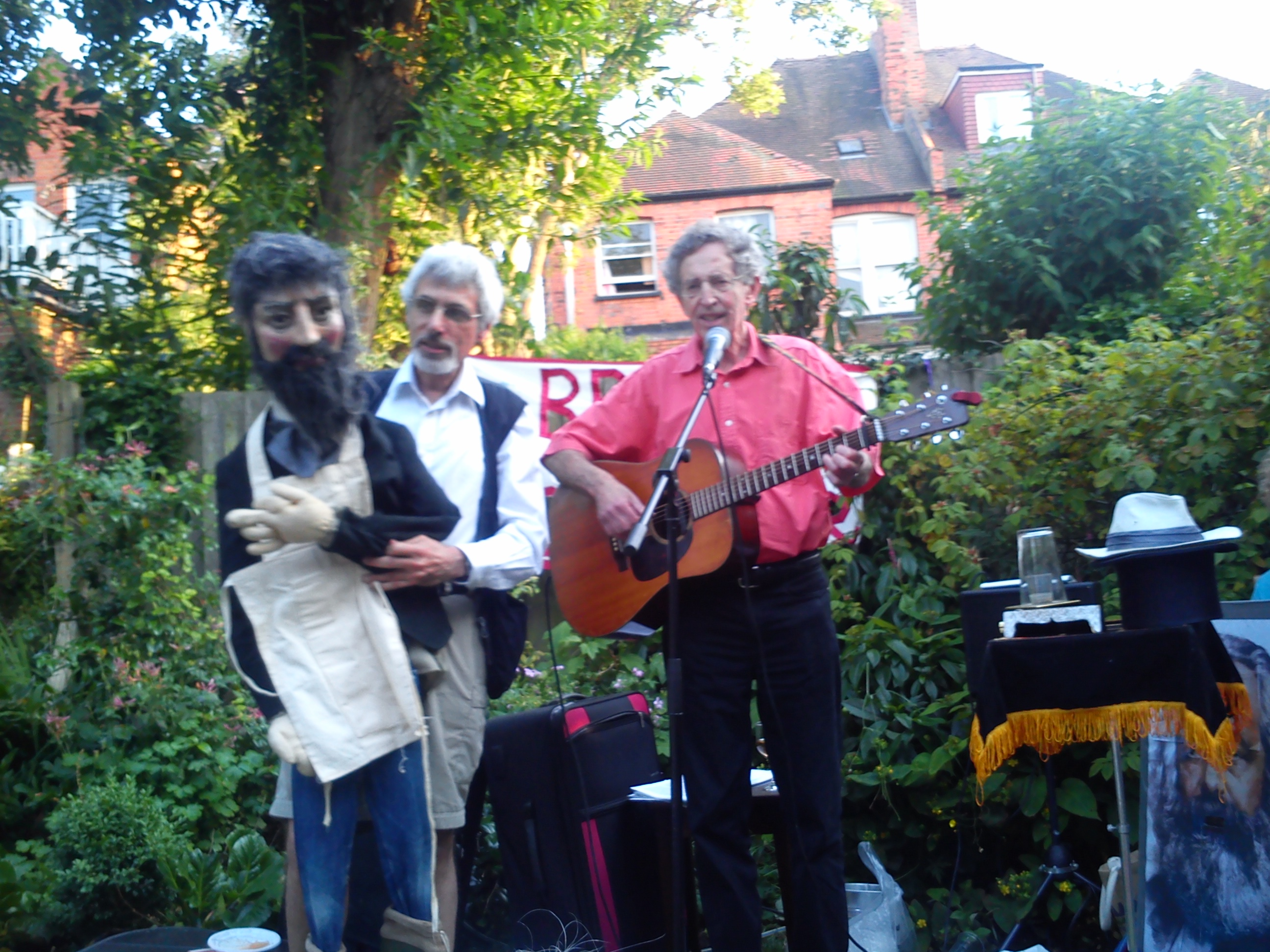
Leon Rosselson (right), performing with Ian Saville and "William Morris"

=== The Galliards ===
- The Galliards (EP) (1960)
- Scottish Choice (1961)
- A-Rovin' (1961)
- Galliards (1962)

=== The Three City Four ===
- The Three City Four (1965) Decca LK 4705
- Smoke and Dust (Where the Heart Should Have Been) (1967) CBS CBS 63039
- Smoke and Dust (CD) (Compilation of tracks from above two albums, released 2010) Fuse Records CFCD068

=== Solo recordings ===
- Songs for City Squares (EP) (1962)
- Songs for Sceptical Circles (1966)
- A Laugh, a Song and a Hand Grenade (with Adrian Mitchell) (1968)
- Word Is Hugga Mugga Chugga Lugga Hum Bugga Boom Chit (1971) Trailer LER 3015
- Palaces of Gold (1975) FUSE CF 249
- That's Not the Way It's got to Be (with Roy Bailey) (1975) FUSE CF 251

Issued in the US as Songs of Life from a Dying British Empire (1981)

- Love Loneliness and Laundry (with Roy Bailey) (1977) FUSE CF 271
- If I Knew Who the Enemy Was (with Roy Bailey) (1979) FUSE CF 284
- For the Good of the Nation (Live, 1981) FUSE CF 381
- Temporary Loss of Vision (1983) FUSE CF 384
- Bringing the News from Nowhere (1986) FUSE CF 390
- "Ballad of a Spycatcher"/"Song of the Free Press" (single with Billy Bragg and The Oyster Band) (1987)
- I Didn't Mean It (with Frankie Armstrong, Roy Bailey, Billy Bragg, Martin Carthy, John Kirkpatrick, Rory McLeod, The Oyster Band and Fiz Shapur) (1988) Fuse CF 392
- Wo Sind Die Elefanten? (Where Are The Elephants?) (1991)
- Intruders (1995) Fuse CFCD 005
- Harry's Gone Fishing (1999) Fuse CFCD 007
- The Last Chance (EP: 4 song CD) (2002) Fuse CFCD 008
- A Proper State (2008)
- The Liberty Tree (with Robb Johnson) (2010)
- Where Are The Barricades? (2016)

=== Compilation albums ===
- Rosselsongs (1990)
- Guess What They're Selling at the Happiness Counter (1992)
- Perspectives (1997)
- Turning Silence into Song (2004)
- The Last Chance (extended edition of the 2002 EP of the same name) (2010)
- The World Turned Upside Down – Rosselsongs 1960–2010 (2011)

=== For children ===
- Questions: Songs and Stories for Children (1994) (Cassette only. Reissued on CD, 2006)
- Five Little Frogs (with Sandra Kerr, Nancy Kerr and Kevin Graal)
- Five Little Owls (with Sandra Kerr, Nancy Kerr and Kevin Graal)
- The Greatest Drummer in the World

=== Others ===
- Songs for Swinging Landlords To (with Stan Kelly) (1961)
- Vote For Us (with numerous other) (1964)
- Nuclear Power No Thanks (with numerous others) (1981)
- And They All Sang Rosselsongs (sung by 15 other performers) (2005)

In 2009, "Greedy Landlord" from Songs for Swinging Landlords To was included in Topic Records 70 year anniversary boxed set Three Score and Ten as track twelve on the sixth CD.

== Bibliography ==
=== Some children's books ===
- Rosa's Singing Grandfather, Puffin (1991). ISBN 0-14-034587-6
- Rosa's Grandfather Sings Again, Viking Children's Books (1991). ISBN 0-670-83599-4
- Where's My Mum?, Walker Books (1994). ISBN 0-7445-4377-0
- I Thought I Heard a Goldfish Singing, Longman (1994). ISBN 0-582-12960-5
- Emma's Talking Rabbit, Collins (1996). ISBN 0-00-675206-3
- Pumpkin's Downfall, Collins (2000). ISBN 0-00-675472-4
- Home is a Place Called Nowhere, OUP (2002). ISBN 0-19-272586-6

=== Songbooks ===
- Look Here (1968)
- That's Not The Way It's Got To Be (1974)
- For the Good of the Nation (1981)
- Bringing the News from Nowhere (125 selected songs) (1993)
- Turning Silence into Song (2003)

== See also ==
- Political Song Network
