= Robb Johnson =

British musician and songwriter (born 1955)

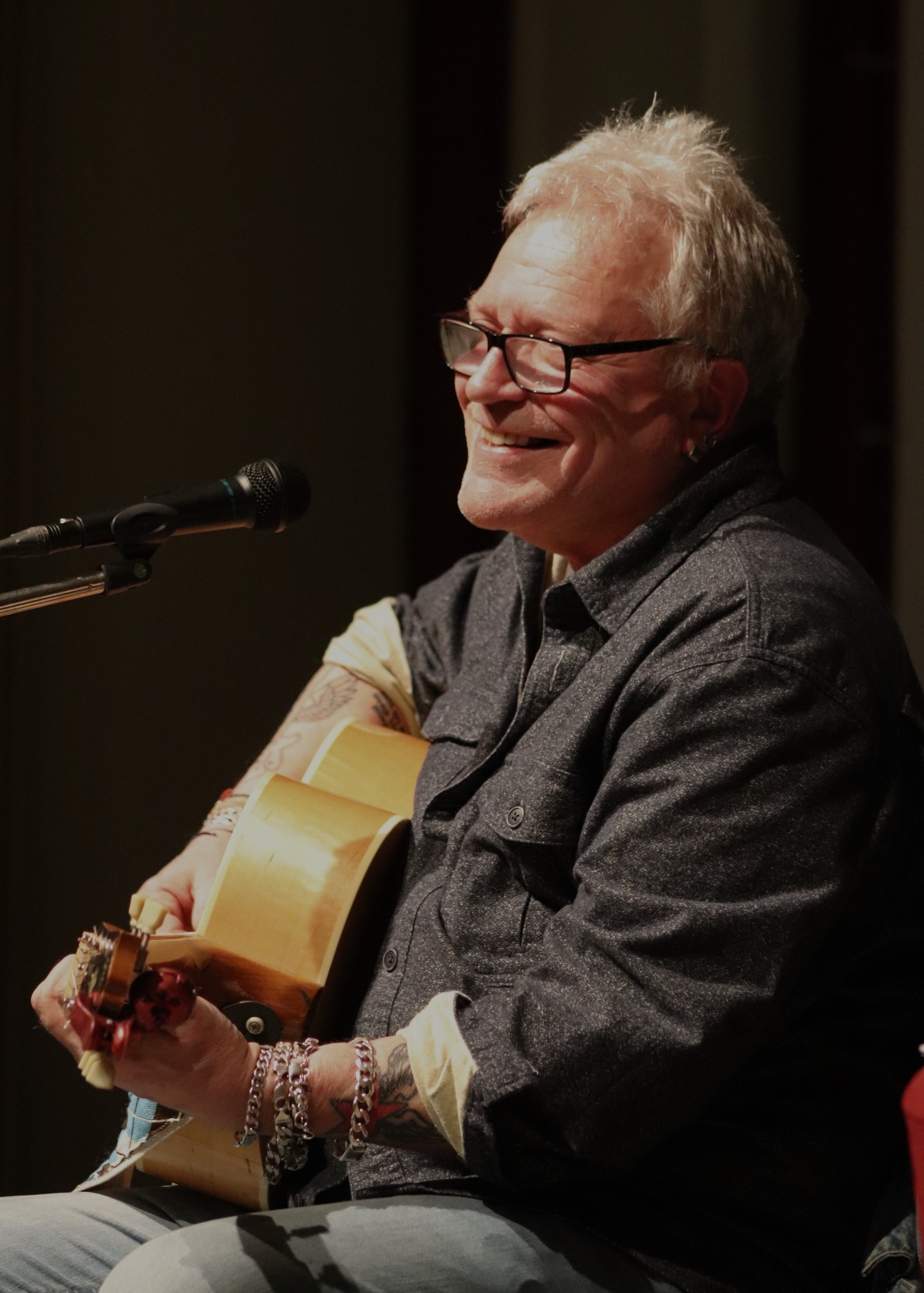
- Johnson performing in 2025

Background information
- Born: Robb Jenner Johnson; 25 December 1955 (age 70); Isleworth, England
- Genres: Folk, punk
- Occupation: Singer-songwriter
- Instruments: Vocals, guitar
- Label: Irregular Records
- Website: robbjohnson.com

Robb Jenner Johnson (born 25 December 1955) is a British musician and songwriter who has been called "one of the last genuinely political songwriters". He is known for his mix of political satire and wit. He has his own record label, Irregular Records, and has released more than 40 albums since 1985, either solo or in several collaborations.

== Biography ==
Johnson began his musical career playing in folk clubs in the 1970s. He ran a folk club at the University of Sussex, before forming a band called Grubstreet, which split up in 1983. Two years later, he made his first solo album, In Amongst the Rain, setting up his own label on which to release it, before forming an agitprop group, The Ministry of Humour, with Mark Shilcock and Graham Barnes. After the break-up of this act and a failed attempt at forming a new electric band, he returned to performing solo, and also formed a duo with female singer Pip Collings.

In 1997, he composed the song cycle Gentle Men, based on the experiences of his grandfathers in the First World War. The song cycle was recorded by Johnson in collaboration with Roy Bailey, and performed at the commemorative Passchendaele Peace Concert. In 2006 he was a special guest at the BBC's "Folk Britannia" concert at the Barbican Centre, ending the night with a rendition of the World War I song "Hanging on the Old Barbed Wire". He remains active and has released at least one album annually for over 20 years, as well as playing regular gigs, including benefits and political events.

In 2016, Johnson and a group billed as the Corbynistas released the single "JC 4 PM 4 Me" in support of Labour Party leader Jeremy Corbyn, which was considered a contender for Christmas number one. However, it did not chart.

== Discography ==
=== Albums ===
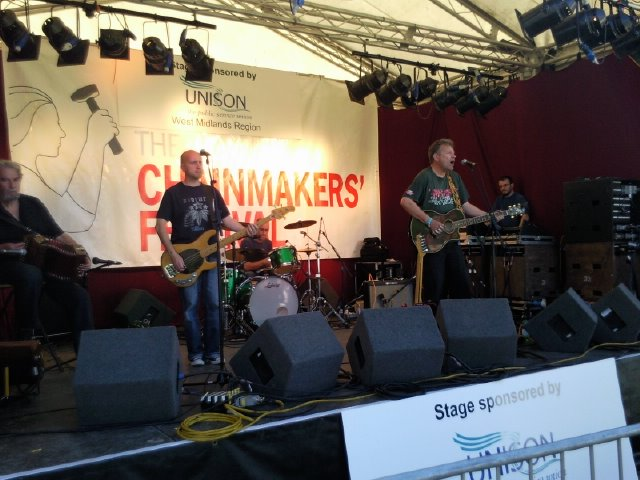
Johnson performing with his band The Irregulars at the Black Country Living Museum in 2009

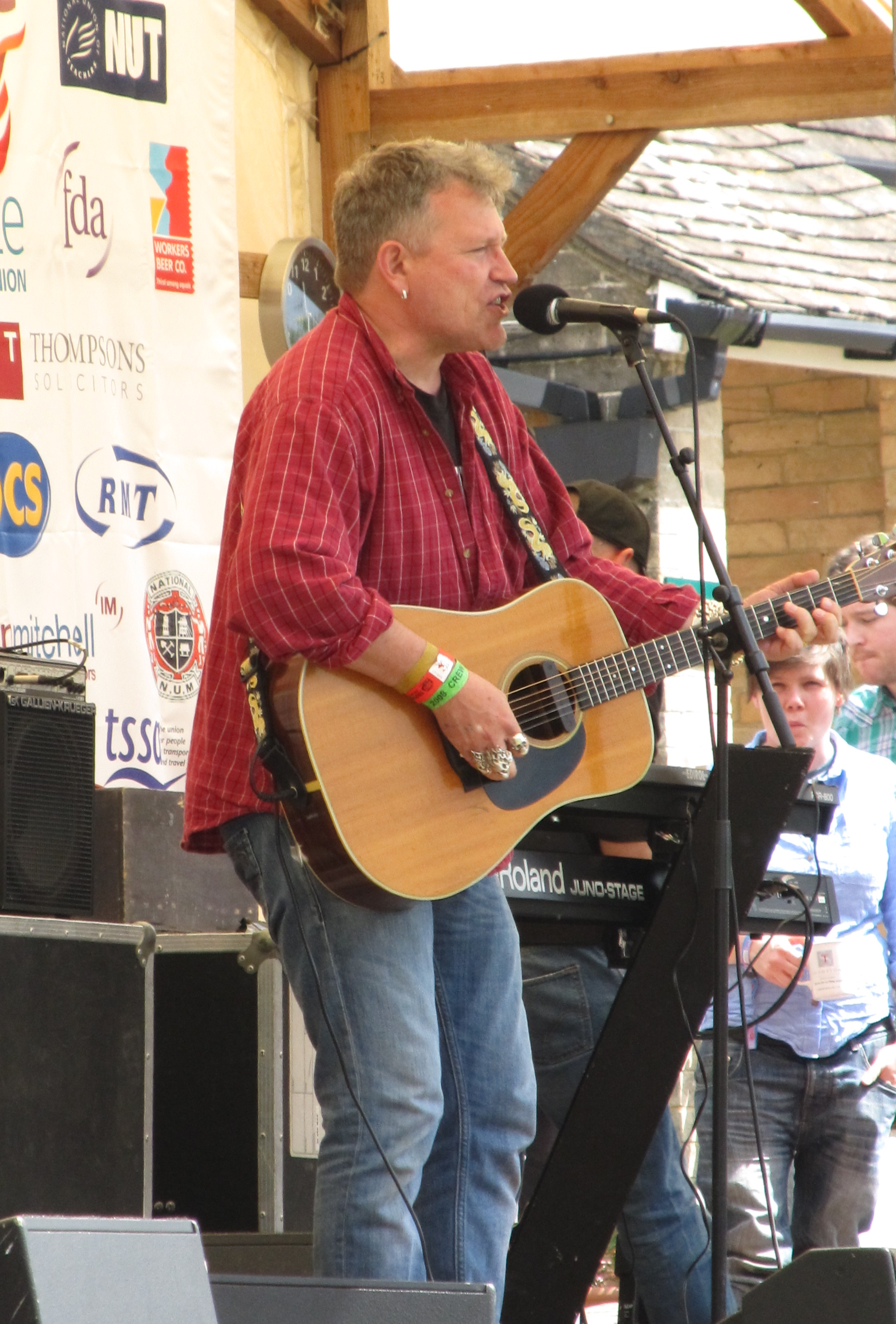
Johnson performing at the Tolpuddle Martyrs' Festival and Rally 2012

- In Amongst The Rain (1985)
- Songs for the New Jerusalem (1987)
- Skewed, Slewed, Stewed & Awkward (1987)
- Small Town World (1989)
- Overnight (1991) (Robb Johnson and Pip Collings)
- Tourists and Casualties (1993) (The Johnson-Collings Band)
- Heart's Desire (1994) (Robb Johnson and Pip Collings)
- 1-2-3 (1994) (The Johnson-Collings Band)
- Lack of Jolly Ploughboy (1995) (Robb Johnson and Pip Collings)
- Lavender Blues (1995, six-track mini-album)
- Interesting Times (1995) (The Robb Johnson Band)
- The Night Café (1995)
- Hell's Kitchen (1996) (The Robb Johnson Roots Band)
- Ugly Town (1997)
- Invisible People (1997)
- Gentle Men (1997) (Roy Bailey, Vera Coomans, Robb Johnson, & Koen De Cauter & The Golden Serenaders)
- The Big Wheel (1999)
- 21st Century Blues (2001) (Robb Johnson, Miranda Sykes and Saskia Tomkins)
- The Triumph of Hope Over Experience (2002)
- Clockwork Music (2003)
- Metro (2005)
- All That Way For This (2007) (Robb Johnson & The Irregulars)
- Love & Death & Politics (2008) (Robb Johnson & The Irregulars)
- The Liberty Tree (2009) (Leon Rosselson and Robb Johnson)
- The Ghost of Love (2009) (Robb Johnson & The Irregulars)
- Man Walks into a Pub (2010)
- Some Recent Protest Songs (2011)
- Once Upon a Time (2011) (Robb Johnson & The Irregulars)
- Happily Ever After (2012) (Robb Johnson & The Irregulars)
- Bring Down the Moon (2013)
- Us and Them (2014)
- Here Goes Nothing (2015) (Robb Johnson & The Irregulars)
- My Best Regards (2016)
- Ordinary Giants (2018)
- Eurotopia (2019)
- Pandemic Songs (2020)
- Stay Cool, Keep Left, Shine Bright (2022) (Robb Johnson & The Irregulars)
- The Mystery Gets Your Number & The Poetry Makes The Call (2022) (Robb Johnson & The Irregulars)

=== Compilations, re-issues and live ===
- This Is the UK Talking (1994) [singles, benefits, demos: 1987–1994]
- Overnight [1996, solo re-recording of tracks from the 1991 album of the same name and Tourists and Casualties]
- Yeah Yeah Yeah: So Far So Good 1991–1998 (1998) (The Robb Johnson Band)
- The Big Wheel – The Second XI and Alternative Versions (1999) [live recordings and tracks omitted from the album of the same name]
- Margaret Thatcher: My Part in Her Downfall (2000) [re-recordings, inc. unreleased songs]
- Maximum Respect (2002) [compilation of animal-themed songs inc. new tracks]
- Friday Night in Brentford (2003) [live]
- Tony Blair: My Part in His Downfall (2004) [2CD; demos, website tracks & unreleased: 1997–2004]
- A Beginner's Guide (2005) [re-recordings plus new songs]
- Saturday Night at The Fire Station (2006) (Robb Johnson & The Irregulars) [live]
- Margaret Thatcher: My Part in Her Downfall – Deluxe (2009) [box set comprising 3rd & 4th albums plus other rare & unreleased material]
- West Pier Serenade (2013) [re-recordings plus 1 new song]
- Gentle Men (2013) [re-recording of 1997 album plus new songs, by Johnson, Roy Bailey, Barb Jungr, Jude Abbott, Jenny Carr, John Forrester]
- Gentle Men – A Live Performance (2015) [solo recording]
- A Reasonable History of Impossible Demands 1986–2013 (2016) [5-CD box set]
- Best Regards – Live (2016)
- Songs From The Past Seven Years (2017)

=== Singles and EPs ===
- "The Animals Song" 7" (1986)
- "The Herald of Free Enterprise" 7" (1988)
- "Wasted Years" 7" (1991)
- Living in the Rubbish 12" (1991) (Robb Johnson and Pip Collings)
- Saturday Afternoon Red Army CD EP (1995)
- "Sweet Jane" / "Bay of Angels" 7" (2014)
- "Cheap and Cheerful" / "The Top of This Wheel" 7" (2015)
- "Don't Close the Bar" / "Even Steve McQueen" 7" (2016)
- "JC 4 PM 4 Me" / "What Would You Like For Christmas?" (2016)
- The Beautiful Dark 10" EP (2017)
- "Tony Skinner's Lad" (2020) – UK Singles Downloads Chart no. 19

=== Other appearances ===
- "Not A Bad Day" – track on compilation album Fear of a Red Planet, 1999.
- "Permanent Free Zone" – track on compilation album Return of the Read Menace, 1999.
- "When the People Rise Again" – track on the charity album That Eastern Wind – Songs and Poems of Geoff Parry, vol 8 (2008)
- "A Fine Career" – Johnson contributes lead vocals on this track from Chumbawamba's 2008 album, The Boy Bands Have Won.
- "The Future Starts Here" – track on compilation album Don't Be Left Without Us, 2016.

== Personal life ==
Johnson married Meeta Kanabar on 22 August 1992. The couple have two sons, Hari (born 1998) and Arvin (born 1999). Johnson worked as a teacher at various schools in London, but relocated to Hove in around 2006. He is a supporter of Brentford F.C. and has performed fund-raising concerts for the club.
