= Jon Moore =

Welsh footballer

Personal information
- Date of birth: 17 November 1955 (age 70)
- Place of birth: Cardiff, Wales
- Position: Left back

Senior career*
Years	Team	Apps	(Gls)
1973–1974	Bristol Rovers	0	(0)
1974–1979	Millwall	119	(5)
1979–1981	Bournemouth	36	(2)
- Maidstone United
- Gravesend & Northfleet
Total		155	(7)
- * Club domestic league appearances and goals

Jon Moore (born 17 November 1955) is a Welsh former footballer who played as a left back in the Football League.
