= The Purple Hearts (Australian band) =

Australian R&B/rock band

- Also known as: The Impacts
- Origin: Brisbane, Queensland, Australia
- Genres: R&B, rock
- Years active: 1964–1967
- Label: Sunshine/Festival
- Spinoffs: Coloured Balls
- Past members: Bob Dames; Mick Hadley; Barry Lyde; Fred Pickard; Adrian "Red" Redmond; Paul Steffen; Tony Cahill

The Purple Hearts were an Australian R&B, rock group, formed in Brisbane as the Impacts in 1964. The band included lead vocalist Mick Hadley, lead guitarist Barry Lyde (later known as Lobby Loyde), rhythm guitarists Paul Steffen (1964–65) and Fred Pickard (1965-66), bassist Bob Dames, and drummers Adrian "Red" Redmond (1964–66) and Tony Cahill (1966-67). The group issued an extended play, The Sound of the Purple Hearts (1966), and several singles, including "Long-legged Baby" (1965) and "Early in the Morning" (1966). They disbanded early in 1967.

== History ==
Purple Hearts were formed in Brisbane in 1964 with the original line-up of Bob Dames on bass guitar (ex-Impacts), Mick Hadley on lead vocals (ex-Impacts), Barry Lyde on lead guitar (ex-Stilettos), Fred Pickard on rhythm guitar and Adrian "Red" Redmond on drums. Dames and Hadley had both migrated from London in the previous year or so and formed the Impacts, an R&B group, with Scottish-born Pickard and two locals, Lyde and Redmond. Lyde had joined the Stilletos in 1963 to play the Shadows-styled instrumentals and left near the end of the following year to join the Impacts.

Brisbane, traditionally the most conservative of Australia's state capitals, has fostered some of this country's most anarchistic rock bands from the Purple Hearts to the Saints. The Purple Hearts were tough, arrogant and pioneering and Lyde, as Lobby Loyde, is acknowledged as Australia's first true rock guitar hero – busy blowing up speaker boxes before high volume and feed-back became rock staples. When the Impacts performed in Melbourne, they found another band of the same name, so Dames provided their new name – Purple Hearts – for the illicit amphetamine pills favoured by the mod subculture. The group's debut single, "Long-legged Baby", was a cover version of Graham Bond's track. It was "a rough recording made at a radio station studio" and issued "on the obscure, independent label Soundtrack" in 1965.

They signed with Sunshine Records (home to Normie Rowe) and reissued "Long-legged Baby" in October 1965, which reached the top 10 in Brisbane. The group were uncompromising in their attitude toward recording; consequently, their handful of singles are enduring artefacts of their style, which blended blues, R&B and prototype psychedelic rock, a style made even tougher by the regional influences. The group relocated to Sydney, where Redmond was replaced by Tony Cahill on drums.

Early in 1966 they moved base to Melbourne, where they "ruled over the city's discotheque circuit." According to music journalist, Ed Nimmervoll, "they were making an impression in their own right, not because their music was the latest thing. The Purple Hearts' Mick Hadley was an amazing frontman, riveting audiences with his wild-eyed performances. The rest of the band were quickly considered the best in their field, especially guitarist Barry Lyde." In February of that year they issued their second single, "Of Hopes and Dreams and Tombstones". It was a cover version of the United States singer, Jimmy Fraser's 1965 single.

They enjoyed minor chart success with their next single "Early in the Morning" (August 1966) – a cover of a 1947 field recording of a traditional prison song by Alan Lomax, released in 1959 – which peaked at No. 9 in Melbourne and No. 13 in Brisbane. Soon after they compiled their earlier singles, "Long-legged Baby" and "Of Hopes and Dreams and Tombstones" on a four-track extended play, The Sound of the Purple Hearts, on the Sunshine label. They made several appearances on a pop TV series, The Go!! Show. On 23 January 1967 the group issued a press release stating "they had ceased to progress musically, were becoming stagnant and, therefore, had decided to split." Lyde, under the name Lobby Loyde, had already joined Wild Cherries in that month, alongside Keith Barber on drums, Peter Eddey on bass guitar, Les Gilbert on organ and Danny Robinson on vocals. The other four members of Purple Hearts continued for another month and released two more singles, "You Can't Sit Down" (January 1967) and "Chicago" (posthumously in April). Cahill travelled to the United Kingdom where he joined the Easybeats on drums.

Following the split of the Purple Hearts, Hadley spent several months in the UK. There he was contacted by Go-Set journalist Lily Brett, who invited him to join Rob Lovett (ex-The Loved Ones, her then-domestic partner) and Malcolm McGee (ex-Python Lee Jackson) in the Virgil Brothers, a male soul vocal trio, modelled on the Walker Brothers. Hadley was only involved for a brief period and dropped out of the group after a few rehearsals, before the group made its live debut in mid-1967. He was replaced in the group by 18-year-old vocalist, Peter Doyle, who subsequently became a member of the New Seekers.

Following his departure from the Virgil Brothers, Hadley reunited with Dames and kept the Purple Hearts tradition alive by forming the Coloured Balls. Besides Dames and Hadley the R&B group included Sam Shannon on lead vocals, Robbie Van Delft on guitar (ex-Mike Furber and the Bowery Boys) and Peter Miles on drums (ex-Bay City Union). Loyde revitalised the traditional jazz band, the Wild Cherries, into a psychedelic rock group. He played a pivotal role in Billy Thorpe's transformation from clean-cut 1960s pop idol into an archetypal long-haired, guitar-wielding 1970s hard rocker. In 1972 Loyde led a reformed version of the Coloured Balls as a progressive rock group, with Andrew Fordham on guitar and vocals; Janis Miglans on bass guitar; and Trevor Young on drums. Loyde was also a record producer. In 1970 Dames and Miles were members of Bulldog, a progressive blues trio, with UK-born Mick Rogers.

== Discography ==
=== Albums ===
- The Purple Hearts (2005)
- Benzedrine Beat! (2006)

=== Extended plays ===
- The Sound of the Purple Hearts (1966)
- The Purple Hearts (1979)

=== Singles ===
Year	Single	Chart Positions
Year	Single	AUS
1965	"Long Legged Baby"	89
1966	"Of Hopes and Dreams and Tombstones"	58
1966	"Early In The Morning"	33
1967	"You Can't Sit Down"	74
1967	"Chicago"	-

== Awards and nominations ==
=== Go-Set Pop Poll ===
The Go-Set Pop Poll was coordinated by teen-oriented pop music newspaper, Go-Set and was established in February 1966 and conducted an annual poll during 1966 to 1972 of its readers to determine the most popular personalities.

Year	Nominee / work	Award	Result
1966	themselves	Best Australian Group	3rd

== See also ==
- Australian rock
- Billy Thorpe & the Aztecs
- Purple Hearts (UK band)
