= The Moir Sisters =

Australian musical trio

- Also known as: The Moirs
- Origin: Melbourne, Victoria, Australia
- Genres: Pop; folk
- Years active: 1970–1990
- Labels: EMI; Rocket
- Past members: Jean Moir; Margot Moir; Lesley Moir

The Moir Sisters were a Scottish-Australian pop and folk vocal trio which formed in 1970 by the eponymous sisters, Jean, Margot and Lesley. Their debut single, "Good Morning (How Are You?)" (1974), which featured their distinctive high-pitched harmonies, peaked at No. 8 on the Kent Music Report Singles Chart. The group released two albums, Lost: Somewhere Beyond Harmony (1974) and State of Shock (as The Moirs, 1978), In 1989 Margot Moir (married name: Margot Cesario) released a solo single, "Scarlet Skies" and followed with her album, Strong and Mighty, in 1996. Margot died in 2015 from complications of her diabetes.

== History ==
The Moir Sisters were formed in 1970 as a folk, pop trio in Melbourne by Jean (born 1956) on co-lead vocals, Margot Rae (born 1959) on co-lead vocals and guitar, and Lesley Moir (born 1961) on co-lead vocals. They were born in Scotland, to Edward Hoy Moir and June Moir (née Stirling), and emigrated to Melbourne in 1962. They returned to Scotland, where their youngest daughter, Leanne, was born in 1968. Margot was given a guitar as a gift; she took to it immediately, and was soon writing her own songs.

The sisters launched their musical trio upon return to Australia late in 1970. In 1974 they won a heat of the TV talent quest, New Faces, on Melbourne's GTV-9, and then they competed in the national final. To capitalise on the national exposure of their New Faces appearances, the trio were signed EMI Music Australia. Their self-penned debut single, "Good Morning (How Are You?)", was released in May 1974. It was produced by Ian Miller, arranged by film critic and musician Ivan Hutchinson, and engineered by Roger Savage. It peaked at No. 8 on the Kent Music Report Singles Chart and remained in the top 50 for 19 weeks.

The Moir Sisters released their debut album in 1974, Lost Somewhere Beyond Harmony, with original songs co-written by the sisters. It was produced by Miller, arranged by Geoff Hales (who also played synthesisers and keyboards), engineered by Ross Cockle, with backing from session musicians: guitarists Phil Manning and Billy Green (later known as Will Greenstreet), bass guitarists Barry Sullivan and Duncan McGuire, drummers Graham Morgan, Mark Kennedy and Gary Hyde, keyboard player Mal Logan, jazz saxophonist Brian Brown and backing vocalist, Dan Robinson (ex Wild Cherries). The trio undertook a national tour supporting the Osmonds, but their career was limited as Lesley was 13 at the time, which meant that their live performances had to be approved by the Child Welfare Department of the Victorian Government.

By the late 1970s they were managed by former musician, Glenn Wheatley (then-manager of Little River Band), and after leaving EMI, they signed to Oz Records in Australia, and to Elton John's label, The Rocket Record Company internationally. They shortened their name to the Moirs, and travelled to Los Angeles to record their second album, State of Shock, which was produced by expatriate Australian musician, songwriter and producer, John Farrar, and released later in 1978.

In the early 1980s the trio were signed to Warner Music Group in Australia and issued two more singles, "So Excited" (1982) and "Running Scared" (1983), but neither charted.

In 1989 Margot Moir released her solo single, "Scarlet Skies", and it was followed by the album, Strong and Mighty in 1996. In 2003 the sisters were interviewed for ABC-TV's music documentary series, Love Is in the Air, episode two, "She's Leaving Home". Margot Cesario (née Moir) died on 26 January 2015, aged 56, from complications due to long term diabetes.

== Discography ==
=== Studio albums ===
List of albums, with selected details and chart positions
Title	Album details	Peak chart positions
Title	Album details	AUS
Lost – Somewhere Beyond Harmony	Released: 1975; Format: LP; Label: EMI (EMA-311)	69
State of Shock (as The Moirs)	Released: 1978; Format: LP; Label: Rocket (BXL1-2956)	–

=== Singles ===
List of singles, with selected chart positions
Title	Year	Peak chart positions	Album
Title	Year	AUS	Album
"Good Morning (How Are You?)" / "We Will Never Change"	1974	8	Lost – Somewhere Beyond Harmony
"Harmony Blues" / "Stop the Music"	1975	68	Lost – Somewhere Beyond Harmony
"Don't Tell Your Mama" / "Wandering Home"	1975	—	Non-album singles
"So Excited" / "You Won't Get Me"	1982	—	Non-album singles
"Running Scared" / "See You Coming"	1983	—	Non-album singles
