= The Hoax Is Over =

Studio album by The Aztecs
- Released: January 1971
- Recorded: September 1970
- Studio: Festival Studios, Armstrong Studios
- Genre: Blues
- Length: 51:50
- Label: Infinity
- Producer: The Aztecs

The Hoax Is Over is an album by Australian blues-rock band, The Aztecs.

== Background and recording ==
Billy Thorpe, the leader of the Aztecs, renewed the band in late 1968. Guitarist Lobby Loyde joined the band, and they turned to a more bluesy, heavier style. The new band's debut album was recorded in September 1970, and was released at the beginning of the following year.

== Release ==
"The Hoax Is Over" was released in January 1971 by Infinity. All of four tracks of the album also released on the 3-CD compilation in 1994, but "Gangster of Love" and "Mississippi" (renamed to "Born in Mississippi") in a shortened version.

== Track listing ==
1. "Gangster of Love"
2. "Goodbye Baby"
3. "Mississippi"
4. "Truth"

== Personnel ==
- Billy Thorpe – vocals, harmonica, rhythm guitar
- Lobby Loyde – lead guitar
- Warren Morgan – keyboards
- Paul Wheeler – bass
- Kevin Murphy – drums
