= Aretha Brown =

Indigenous Australian activist and artist (born 2000)

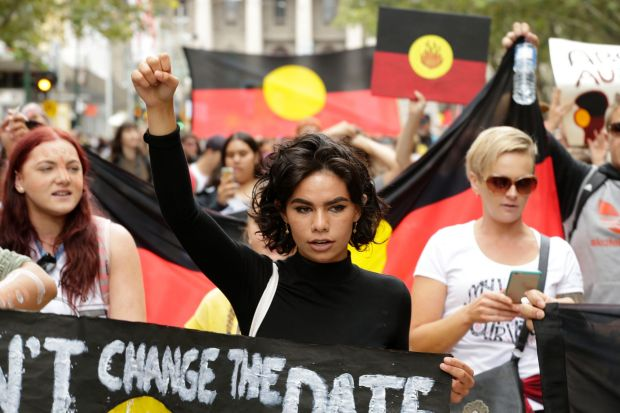
- Brown at the 2017 Invasion Day protest
- Born: 11 November 2000 (age 25); Melbourne, Australia
- Occupations: Activist, comedian, artist
- Relatives: Paul Stewart (father)

Aretha Brown, or Aretha Stewart-Brown (born 11 November 2000), is an Indigenous Australian youth activist, comedian, artist, and the former Prime Minister of the National Indigenous Youth Parliament.

Brown has given talks, speeches and acknowledgement of country ceremonies for various organisations, including the ACTU, Landcare, Minus 18, Melbourne University, Jesuit Social Services, One Tree Foundation, Mission Australia, The Australian Shrine of Remembrance, Triple J and for the Australian College of International Surgeons.

== Early life ==
Brown was born in Melbourne on 11 November 2000. She is the daughter of rock frontman Paul Stewart, of the Painters and Dockers, and the contemporary Indigenous artist Donna Brown.

The family moved to the small community of Nambucca Heads in northern New South Wales to be closer to their Gumbaynggirr clan, during her early childhood. They later returned to Melbourne for Aretha's education at Williamstown High School. She commenced an Arts degree in 2019 at Melbourne University.

== Art and activism ==
Brown's art is inspired by her home in Melbourne's Western Suburbs and her journey as a queer teenager. Her first painting "Time is on our Side, You Mob" 2018 was selected for the 2019 Top Arts exhibition at the NGV.

The exhibition showcases young artists’ exploration of contemporary issues.

Brown's output in street art and murals extends to international representation of Australian Indigenous arts, including in the Australian Consulate in New York City and the Australian Embassy in Delhi.

In 2014, Brown was selected to attend the 100th anniversary of the Gallipoli landings in Turkey, as the Australian State representative, acknowledging the Indigenous servicemen who fought during World War I.

In 2017, Brown addressed an estimated 50,000 protesters in Melbourne on Australia Day at an Invasion Day rally, calling for the date of the national holiday to be changed. She has spoken at the 2018 march and other NAIDOC events and marches since then. Brown also attended the National Youth Parliament in Canberra, where she was chosen by 60 of her peers as the first female Indigenous Youth Prime Minister of Australia. In this role, she met Prime Minister Malcolm Turnbull, Opposition leader Bill Shorten and the Governor General Sir Peter Cosgrove. Tim Watts, Brown's local MP, publicly congratulated Brown in the House of Representatives for her achievements.

She has appeared on ABC Radio Melbourne, the national ABC News Breakfast program and on NITV talking about her achievements in Canberra. In 2017, Brown appeared in the ABC TV documentary Advice to My Twelve Year Old Self, about Australia's female leaders.
