= Billy Thorpe =

Australian singer-songwriter from New South Wales

- Thorpe performing "Most People I Know" on ABC-TV's GTK, 1972

Background information
- Also known as: Little Rock Allen; Puff'n Billy
- Born: William Richard Thorpe; 29 March 1946; Manchester, England
- Died: 28 February 2007 (aged 60) Sydney, New South Wales, Australia
- Genres: Rock, pop
- Occupations: Singer; songwriter; record producer; guitarist; writer
- Years active: 1956–2007
- Labels: Atlantic, Festival, Mushroom, Liberation
- Formerly of: Billy Thorpe and the Aztecs

William Richard Thorpe AM (29 March 1946 – 28 February 2007) was an English-born Australian singer-songwriter, and record producer. As lead singer of his band Billy Thorpe and the Aztecs, he had success in the 1960s with "Blue Day", "Poison Ivy", "Over the Rainbow", "Sick and Tired", "Baby, Hold Me Close" and "Mashed Potato"; and in the 1970s with "Most People I Know Think That I'm Crazy". Featuring in concerts at Sunbury Pop Festivals and Myer Music Bowl in the early 1970s, the Aztecs also developed the pub rock scene and were one of the loudest groups in Australia.

Thorpe also performed as a solo artist. He relocated to America from 1976 to 1996; after moving, he released the space opera Children of the Sun, which peaked in the top 40 of the Billboard Pop Album chart in 1979. He worked with ex-Aztec Tony Barber to form a soft toy company in 1987 and co-wrote stories for The Puggle Tales and Tales from the Lost Forests. Thorpe also worked as a producer and composed music scores for TV series including War of the Worlds, Star Trek: The Next Generation, Columbo, Eight Is Enough and Hard Time on Planet Earth.

Thorpe returned to Australia in 1996 and continued as a performer and producer, additionally writing two autobiographies, Sex and Thugs and Rock 'n' Roll (1996) and Most People I Know (Think That I'm Crazy) (1998). According to Australian rock music historian Ian McFarlane, "Thorpie evolved from child star, beat pop sensation and cuddly pop crooner to finally emerge as the country's wildest and heaviest blues rocker. Thorpie was the unassailable monarch of Australian rock music". Thorpe was inducted into the Australian Recording Industry Association (ARIA) Hall of Fame in 1991. He died of a heart attack in February 2007 and was posthumously appointed a Member of the Order of Australia in June for his contribution to music as a musician, songwriter and producer.

Unlike many other Australian artists, Thorpe gained musical fame internationally in countries such as Canada and the United States. His cult following, particularly after the aforementioned sci-fi themed album Children of the Sun came out, notably involved dramatic live performances outside of Australia such as with laser light shows playing inside multiple planetariums. That release alone sold approximately half a million copies worldwide.

In 2009, Thorpe was announced as one of the Q150 Icons selected for historical commemoration by the government of Queensland, his influence being recognized during the Q150 celebrations. His musical legacy continues after his death, particularly around local areas that he frequently played within live.

== Career ==
=== 1946–1962: Early life ===
Billy Thorpe was born in Manchester, England, in 1946, to Bill and Mabel Thorpe. He emigrated with his parents to Australia in 1955, arriving in Melbourne and then settling in Brisbane, Queensland. He performed as a ten-year-old under the pseudonym Little Rock Allen. Six months later, after he was heard singing and playing guitar by a television producer at the back of his parents' Brisbane store, Thorpe made regular musical appearances on Queensland television, brandishing his trademark stock whip. He toured regional venues with Reg Lindsay in 1961, and national venues with Johnny O'Keefe and with Col Joye. By 1963, as an experienced singer and musician, he decided to relocate to Sydney.

=== 1963–1967: Success in Sydney ===
In 1963, Thorpe moved to Sydney and auditioned for a regular gig at Surf City, a popular beat music venue in the city's Kings Cross area. In 1996, Thorpe wrote his first autobiography, Sex and thugs and rock 'n' roll : a year in Kings Cross 1963–1964, on his early experiences there. His backing band was an accomplished Sydney surf instrumental group called The Aztecs, comprising Colin Baigent (drums), Val Jones (rhythm guitar), future Bee Gees guitarist Vince Melouney (aka Vince Maloney) (lead guitar, vocals), and John "Bluey" Watson (bass guitar). Before Thorpe joined, The Aztecs had released "Smoke and Stack", a surf instrumental. UK-born Tony Barber (rhythm guitar, vocals) soon replaced Jones and they were known as Billy Thorpe & the Aztecs.

In 1964, the band released their second single, "Blue Day", written by guitarist Barber, which contains the first known recording of Thorpe. US songwriters Leiber and Stoller wrote "Poison Ivy" for R&B vocal group The Coasters, but Thorpe preferred the cover version by The Rolling Stones. They decided to cover it themselves; it was produced at Festival Records and released on the independent Linda Lee label. It became their breakthrough hit when it peaked at No. 1 on the local Sydney charts. The band was signed by Ted Albert to his newly established Albert Productions, a local record label devoted exclusively to recording Australian pop artists. Billy Thorpe & the Aztecs had national chart success, their record sales and concert attendances rivalling those of The Beatles, with hits like "Mashed Potato", "Sick and Tired" and Wizard of Oz tune "Over the Rainbow" in the top ten of the record charts in most state capitals. Thorpe once said that "Mashed Potato" was inspired by a chance meeting with a schoolteacher at the Rex Hotel in Kings Cross, who was so drunk he could only mumble the words, "Mashed Potato."

The original Aztecs lineup split from Thorpe at the beginning of 1965 over a financial dispute, so he created another set, with Johnny Dick (drums), Mike Downes (rhythm guitar, vocals), Colin Risbey (lead guitar, vocals), Jimmy Taylor (piano), Teddy Toi (bass guitar), Tony Buchanan (saxophone) and Rocky Thomas (brass). This lineup achieved further success with pop ballads such as "I Told the Brook", "Twilight Time" and "Love Letters". On 27 March 1966, Sydney TV station ATN-7 debuted a music show, It's All Happening!, hosted by Thorpe with the Aztecs as the house band. Each one-hour episode featured both Australian and international musical guests. Despite the TV exposure, later singles did not chart and when the show ended its run in early 1967, the Aztecs broke up. Thorpe undertook a brief solo career, he released "Dream Baby" (Roy Orbison cover), in October 1967 but it had no chart success. during 1968 he modified his image to display long hair, moustache and a fringed jacket; he formed a new backing band with Dick, Mick Lieber (guitar) and Dave McTaggert (bass guitar) who was quickly replaced by Paul Wheeler. By August, Dick and Lieber had left, and Thorpe relocated to Melbourne.

=== 1968–1975: Melbourne ===
In August 1968 Thorpe had moved to Melbourne with Paul Wheeler (bass guitar) and Jimmy Thompson (drums), Thorpe took up lead guitar as well as lead vocals. As a trio they became the next version of Billy Thorpe & the Aztecs. By December, former Purple Hearts and Wild Cherries guitarist Lobby Loyde joined. Thorpe had recorded no new material for over two years, but he emerged after a spell of bankruptcy in 1969, with "Good Mornin' Little School Girl", a Willie Dixon cover, as a single in March 1970. With the encouragement of Loyde, Thorpe's 'new' Aztecs developed a heavier sound and established themselves as one of Australia's premier hard rock groups. By July, Warren 'Pig' Morgan (piano, vocals) had joined and the band recorded, The Hoax Is Over, which was released in January 1971. Loyde left to reform Wild Cherries (later called Lobby Loyde & the Coloured Balls). After further releases the Aztecs had accrued a considerable reputation in the southern states and became known as one of the loudest acts on the local concert and pub circuit. Thorpe described the sound:

[It was] like we were standing on a pair of Boeing 747 engines. It cracked the foundations and broke windows in neighbouring buildings.

— Billy Thorpe

In 1972, the band played two pivotal gigs, first was the Sunbury Pop Festival in January, which featured the debut of Thorpe's self-penned anthem, "Most People I Know Think That I'm Crazy". Thorpe now had a ponytail, T-shirt, full beard, played guitar and encouraged the Sunbury crowd to "Suck more piss". The No. 2 hit single returned the Aztecs to national prominence. The second major gig was their show at the Sidney Myer Music Bowl during the Moomba Festival in March, which resulted in an estimated 200,000 people filling the park, and forced police to close roads around the venue. Later that year, they released Aztecs Live! At Sunbury, which peaked at No. 4 in September. Ex-Copperwine blues singer Wendy Saddington had top 30 chart success with her 1972 solo single, "Looking Through a Window", which was written and produced by Thorpe and Morgan of the Aztecs. The two Aztecs combined for Downunda which was released in 1973 under the names, Thump'n Pig (Morgan) and Puff'n Billy (Thorpe); with the related single, "Captain Straightman", both album and single peaked into the top 40 of the relevant charts. Saddington had provided vocals and co-wrote a track for the album.

In March 1973, The Who's rock opera Tommy was performed as an orchestral version in Australia with Thorpe in the role of the Local Lad performing "Pinball Wizard". Other Australian artists were Daryl Braithwaite (as Tommy), Wendy Saddington, Doug Parkinson, Broderick Smith, Jim Keays, Colleen Hewett, Linda George, Ross Wilson, Bobby Bright, and Ian Meldrum (as Uncle Ernie in Sydney).

After more line-up changes Thorpe dissolved the Aztecs early in 1975, as a solo artist he recorded Million Dollar Bill, which reached the top 40, with its top 50 single "It's Almost Summer"; and Pick Me Up & Play Me Loud in 1976. Both albums showed another change in style, being a mix of Adult-orientated Rock, funk and country. In December 1976, he relocated to Los Angeles in the United States, although he returned to Australia periodically to tour with varied line-ups of the Aztecs.

=== 1976–1995: United States ===
From December 1976, Thorpe continued his musical career in the US. By 1979, he released his solo space opera, Children of the Sun, which reached the top 40 of the Billboard Pop Album chart, and top 50 in Australia. The related single, "Children of the Sun" reached #41 on the Billboard Singles chart. He released three more studio albums while living in the US, with 21st Century Man (1980) peaking on the Billboard Pop Album chart top 200. "In My Room" from 21st Century Man had top ten chart success in Canada. Other US-based releases were Stimulation (1981) and East of Eden's Gate (1982).

In 1984, Thorpe stopped performing live music. He had started an electronics consulting company which did work for The Walt Disney Company, Mattel and Universal Studios. By 1986, he owned a recording and production studio in Los Angeles, where he worked on musical scoring for television series, including: War of the Worlds, Star Trek: The Next Generation, Columbo, Eight Is Enough and Hard Time on Planet Earth. Former Aztec bandmate, Tony Barber had written a series of children's books, collectively called The Puggle Tales from 1981. Barber and Thorpe had formed a soft toy company in 1987, Sunshine Friends, and also released children's songs on cassettes and video. In 1989 Barber and Thorpe co-wrote three more stories for The Puggle Tales series: Double trouble, Flying's easy and Marco and the book of wisdom.

From 1990, Thorpe collaborated with Mick Fleetwood (of Fleetwood Mac) and Bekka Bramlett in Fleetwood's side project, a band called The Zoo, which resulted in "Shakin the Cage" (no apostrophe), a single featuring Billy Burnette and Kenny Gradney of Little Feat. This was followed by the Shakin' the Cage (apostrophe included) album featuring an altered band line-up and a re-recorded version of the title track in March 1991. Thorpe had written all ten of the tracks, including one (the title track) co-written with Burnette, and another with Bramlett's father Delaney. The Zoo toured Australia during 1991 and while in the country Thorpe was inducted into the ARIA Hall of Fame on 25 March alongside Glenn Shorrock, Don Burrows and Peter Dawson. Fleetwood performed at the ARIA Awards ceremony held at the Darling Harbour Convention Centre in Sydney. Thorpe returned to touring with another set of Aztecs in 1993 and released a boxed set in 1994, Lock Up Your Mothers, which peaked at No. 15 on the ARIA Charts. The Lock Up Your Mothers tour included media appearances on Hey Hey It's Saturday, Denton and 60 Minutes.

=== 1996–2006: Return to Australia ===
In 1996 Thorpe formed the Billy Thorpe Band with Andy Cichon (bass, guitar, keyboards, vocals), Steve Edmonds (guitar, vocals), Paul DeMarco/Mick O'Shea (drums) and Randall Waller (guitar, vocals, keyboards), and toured Australia in July. He had returned to live in Sydney and authored his first autobiography, Sex and Thugs and Rock 'n' Roll, on his early experiences in Kings Cross and the formation of the Aztecs, which was released in November. He followed with an Australian TV appearance on This Is Your Life. In October 1998, he released his second autobiography, Most People I Know (Think That I'm Crazy). On 14 November 1998, with the Aztecs, Thorpe appeared at the Mushroom 25 Concert, singing "Most People I Know" and "Ooh Poo Pah Doo"; ex-Aztec Lobby Loyde joined them on-stage on guitar. At the Gimme Ted benefit concert on 9 March 2001 Thorpe performed five songs including a duet with INXS.

Long Way to the Top was a 2001 Australian Broadcasting Corporation (ABC) six-part documentary on the history of Australian rock and roll from 1956 to the modern era. Episode 3: Billy Killed the Fish, broadcast on 29 August, featured interviews with Loyde, Michael Chugg (Thorpe's manager/promoter) and Thorpe. They described their Sunbury Festival experiences and the development of pub rock in Australia. According to Chugg, an Aztec performance at Sydney's Bondi Lifesaver club in 1974 was so loud as to kill a tankful of tropical fish in an upstairs area – hence the episode title. During August 2002, promoters Chugg and Kevin Jacobsen with Thorpe as co-producer, organised a related concert tour, Long Way to the Top. Concerts included Thorpe performing with the 'original' Aztecs line-up in one set and the 'Sunbury' Aztecs in a second. Performances at two Sydney concerts in September were recorded, broadcast on ABC-TV and subsequently released on DVD in December.

Thorpe recorded material for a new album, Tangier, with the Symphonique Orchestra du Maroc in Casablanca, Morocco during September to November 2006 and was working on the album when he died in Sydney in February 2007. Tangier was produced by Daniel Denholm. In December 2006, Thorpe had recorded an acoustic live performance which was released posthumously in April 2007 on Liberation Records as Solo: The Last Recordings, which peaked at No. 19 on the ARIA albums chart. On 27 October 2010, Sony Entertainment announced the release of Tangier at the ARIA Hall of Fame in Sydney. Tangier was awarded the first-ever posthumous ARIA for Best Contemporary Adult Album in 2011.

=== 2007: Death ===
Thorpe suffered from chest pains at his home on 28 February 2007 and was taken by an ambulance to St. Vincent's Hospital in Sydney around 2:00 am AEDT after having a massive heart attack. He remained in the emergency ward in a serious condition and went into cardiac arrest around half an hour later; hospital staff unsuccessfully attempted to resuscitate him. His family was by his side when he died at 60 years of age. Thorpe is survived by his wife Lynn, and daughters Rusty and Lauren. His manager Michael Chugg said the death was a "terrible tragedy", as Thorpe had just finished recording a new album Tangier and was very happy after a recent acoustic tour. He was posthumously appointed a Member of the Order of Australia on 11 June 2007, with the citation, "For service to the entertainment industry as a musician, songwriter, producer, and as a contributor to the preservation and collection of contemporary Australian music". In December 2020, Thorpe was listed at number 31 in Rolling Stone Australia's "50 Greatest Australian Artists of All Time" issue.

== Discography ==
=== Albums ===
List of albums, with selected details and chart positions
Title	Album details	Peak chart positions
Title	Album details	AUS
Downunda (as Thump'n Pig & Puff'n Billy)	Released: July 1973; Label: Atlantic (SD 1014)	40
More Arse Than Class	Released: May 1974; Label: Atlantic (SD 1017)	14
The Billy Thorpe Rock Classics	Released: 1974; Label: M7. (MLX-064)	—
Million Dollar Bill	Released: November 1975; Label: Infinity / Mushroom (L 35767)	—
Children of the Sun	Released: August 1979; Label: Interfusion (C36980)	44
21st Century Man	Released: February 1981; Label: Mushroom (C 37494)	—
Stimulation	Released: 1981; Label: Mushroom (C 37700)	—
East of Eden's Gate	Released: 1982; Label: Pasha (FZ 38179)	—
Children of the Sun...Revisited	Released: 1987; Label: Pasha (ZK 40682)	—
Solo – The Last Recordings	Released: 2007; Label: Liberation Blue (BLUE147.2)	19
Tangier	Released: October 2010; Label: Sony Music Australia (88697738362)	14

=== EPs ===
Title	Details
Love Letters	Released: 1966; Label: Parlophone (GEPO-70039)

=== Singles ===
List of singles, with selected chart positions
Year	Title	Peak chart positions	Album
Year	Title	AUS	Album
1967	"Dream Baby"/"You Don't Live Twice"	—	
1973	"Captain Straightman"/"Bow My Head" (as Thump'n Pig and Puff'n Billy)	36	Downunda
1975	"It's Almost Summer"/"Drive My Car"	44	
1976	"Do the Best You Can"/"Mama Told Her"	—	
1979	"Children of the Sun"/"Simple Life"	—	
1979	"Wrapped in the Chains of Your Love"/"Goddess of the Night"	85	
1979	"Dream-Maker"/"The Beginning"	—	
1980	"In My Room"/"She's Alive"	—	
1981	"Stimulation"/"Syndrome D.O.A./L.K.O."	—	
1981	"Just the Way I Like It"/"Rock Until You Drop"	—	
1981	"You Touched Me"/"No Rules on the Road"	—	
1982	"No Show Tonight"	—	
1982	"I Can't Stand It"	—	
1982	"Hold On to Your Dream"	—	

- According to AllMusic, Thorpe is credited with: guitars (lead, bass, rhythm), vocals, record producer, sound engineer, keyboards, synthesizer, sound mixing and harmonica.

== Awards and nominations ==
=== ARIA Music Awards ===
The ARIA Music Awards is an annual awards ceremony that recognises excellence, innovation, and achievement across all genres of Australian music. They commenced in 1987. Thorpe was inducted into the Hall of Fame in 1991.

Year	Nominee / work	Award	Result
1991	himself	ARIA Hall of Fame	inductee
2011	Tangier	Best Adult Contemporary Album	Won
2011	David Homer, Aaron Hayward, Debaser for Tangier	Best Cover Art	Nominated
2011	Daniel Denholm for Tangier	Producer of the Year	Nominated
2011	Greg Clarke for Tangier	Engineer of the Year	Nominated

=== Go-Set Pop Poll ===
The Go-Set Pop Poll was coordinated by teen-oriented pop music newspaper, Go-Set and was established in February 1966 and conducted an annual poll during 1966 to 1972 of its readers to determine the most popular personalities.

Year	Nominee / work	Award	Result
1966	himself	Australian Acts: Male Vocal	5th
1971	The Hoax Is Over (as Billy Thorpe & the Aztecs)	Best Album	4th
1972	Aztecs Live at Sunbury (as Billy Thorpe & the Aztecs)	Best Album	1st
1972	"Most People I Know" (as Billy Thorpe & the Aztecs)	Best Single	3rd
1972	Billy Thorpe & the Aztecs	Best Group	2nd
1972	himself	Best Male Singer	5th

=== King of Pop Awards ===
The King of Pop Awards were voted by the readers of TV Week. The King of Pop award started in 1967 and ran through to 1978.

Year	Nominee / work	Award	Result
1972	himself	Best Songwriter	Won
1972	Billy Thorpe & The Aztecs	Best Group	Won

=== Mo Awards ===
The Australian Entertainment Mo Awards (commonly known informally as the Mo Awards), were annual Australian entertainment industry awards. They recognise achievements in live entertainment in Australia from 1975 to 2016. Billy Thorpe won one award in that time.

Year	Nominee / work	Award	Result (wins only)
2006	Billy Thorpe	Rock Performer (Posthumous Award)	Won

== Bibliography ==
- Barber, Anthony A; Billy Thorpe (1989). Double trouble : a puggles story. Illustrated by Michael McHugh, Sharon Ross, Michael Van Cleeve. South Melbourne, Vic: Matchbooks. ISBN 1-86321-015-6.
- Barber, Anthony A; Billy Thorpe (1989). Flying's easy : a puggles story. Illustrated by Michael McHugh, Sharon Ross, Michael Van Cleeve. South Melbourne, Vic: Matchbooks. ISBN 1-86321-014-8.
- Barber, Anthony A; Billy Thorpe (1989). Marco and the book of wisdom : a puggles story. Illustrated by Michael McHugh, Sharon Ross, Michael Van Cleeve. South Melbourne, Vic: Matchbooks. ISBN 1-86321-013-X.
- Barber, Anthony A; Billy Thorpe (1990). The cake escape. Illustrated by Michael McHugh, Sharon Ross, Michael Van Cleeve. South Melbourne, Vic: Magistra. ISBN 1-86321-020-2.
- Barber, Anthony A; Billy Thorpe (1990). Gum fly with me. Illustrated by Michael McHugh, Sharon Ross, Michael Van Cleeve. South Melbourne, Vic: Magistra. ISBN 1-86321-021-0.
- Barber, Anthony A; Billy Thorpe (1990). Ice is nice. Illustrated by Michael McHugh, Sharon Ross, Michael Van Cleeve. South Melbourne, Vic: Magistra. ISBN 1-86321-023-7.
- Barber, Anthony A; Billy Thorpe (1990). No news is good news. Illustrated by Michael McHugh, Sharon Ross, Michael Van Cleeve. South Melbourne, Vic: Magistra. ISBN 1-86321-022-9.
- Thorpe, Billy (1996). Sex and thugs and rock 'n' roll : a year in Kings Cross 1963–1964. Sydney, NSW: Pan Macmillan. ISBN 0-7329-0870-1.
- Thorpe, Billy (1998). Most people I know (think that I'm crazy). Sydney, NSW: Pan Macmillan. ISBN 0-7329-0967-8.
- Thorpe, Billy (2007) [2002]. Sex and thugs and rock "n" roll; Most people I know (think that I'm crazy). Sydney, NSW: Pan Macmillan. ISBN 978-0-7329-1158-4. 2002 edition was a combined re-release of both autobiographies. 2007 edition is also known as Billy Thorpe Commemorative Edition

== See also ==
- List of ARIA Hall of Fame inductees
- Long Way to the Top
- Rock music in Australia
- Pop music in Australia
