= Paulie Stewart =

Australian punk musician

- Born: Paul Michael Stewart; 1960 or 1961 (age 65–66)
- Occupations: Musician, journalist
- Years active: 1979–present
- Known for: Member of Painters and Dockers, the Dili Allstars
- Notable work: All the Rage
- Partner: Donna Brown fl. 2000s
- Children: Aretha Brown

Paul Michael Stewart OAM (born 1960 or 1961) is an Australian singer-songwriter and trumpeter, journalist and writer. He is the founding mainstay of pub rock band, Painters and Dockers (1982-1998, 2014-2026). With fellow members of that group Stewart formed the Dili Allstars in 1992. The Painters and Dockers were inducted into the Age Rock and Roll Hall of Fame in 2010. The group issued four studio albums and staged over 1500 performances across Australia, New Zealand and North America. He issued his autobiography, All the Rage, in 2022.

== Early and personal life ==
Paul Michael Stewart, (born 1960 or 1961) was raised in the Melbourne inner suburb of St Kilda, as the fourth of five children. With his former partner and Indigenous artist Donna Brown, he is the parent of Indigenous activist and artist, Aretha Brown. While Stewart remained in Melbourne, the Browns moved to Nambucca Heads, New South Wales to be closer to their Gumbaynggirr clan, during Aretha's primary school years. From mid-2010s Aretha returned to live with Stewart for secondary and tertiary education. He is also the father of another daughter from an earlier relationship. Stewart received a liver transplant in 2007 and spent 18 months in hospital recovering. Since mid-2010s Stewart has resided in Williamstown, Victoria and worked as a project officer with Jesuit Social Services. In September 2021 he was diagnosed with encephalopathy.

=== Balibo ===
When Stewart was 14 years old, his older brother Tony Stewart, a television journalist and sound recordist, died in October 1975 as one of the Balibo Five: a group of foreign journalists killed in Balibo by invading Indonesian forces in Portuguese Timor (later renamed East Timor). Their deaths inspired the 2009 film Balibo. Stewart was the subject of ABC-TV programme Compass's documentary, "My Brother, Balibo and Me", originally broadcast on 9 August 2009.

== Journalism and All the Rage ==
Stewart began his career as a cadet journalist in 1979 working for The Herald and Weekly Times and The Herald Sun. He later worked as a music journalist for "many years". Stewart published his autobiography in 2022, All the Rage. Michael Dwyer of The Sydney Morning Herald found it is an "inspiring guide" to both Stewart's music career and social activism while avoiding "anger and despair", which have consumed others.

== Painters and Dockers ==
Painters and Dockers were formed in 1982 in Melbourne as a pub rock band by Stewart on lead vocals and trumpet, Vladimir Juric on guitars and backing vocals, Andy Marron on drums, Phil Nelson on bass guitar and Chris O'Connor on guitars and backing vocals. They released four studio albums, Love Planet (1984), Kiss My Art (1988), Touch One, Touch All (1989) and The Things That Matter (1994) before disbanding in 1998. The subsequently reunited in 2014 and disbanded again in 2019. Their only charting album Kiss My Art reached the top 30 on ARIA Charts, while their most popular singles "Nude School" and "Die Yuppie Die" (both 1987) peaked in the top 50 on Kent Music Report singles chart. Stewart co-wrote the latter song with Juric, Morris and O'Connor.

== Dili Allstars ==
Stewart also co-founded the East Timorese-Australian band, Dili Allstars in 1992. He had attended a rally in St Kilda to support East Timorese resistance leader Xanana Gusmão, who had been captured by Indonesian forces in November of that year. At that rally Stewart met Gil Santos, an East Timorese emigré and Gusmão supporter, together they formed the reggae-ska group. Dili Allstars provided two tracks, "Hey Lord Don't Ask Me Questions" and "Liberdade", for Balibo's soundtrack. Stewart co-wrote the latter song with Santos, Billy Abbott and Mark McCartney. At the ARIA Music Awards of 2009, the album won the Best Original Soundtrack, Cast or Show Album.

The band have released three albums, EPs, and a compilation via ABC Music. They toured internationally, performing in Australia, East Timor, Portugal and Brazil and have raised funds for East Timorese charities. Stewart raised funds for the ALMA (Asossiasi Lembaga Misionaris Awam; English: Association of Lay Missionaries for the poor and the disabled) nuns – five Indonesian Catholic women who supported disabled children as physiotherapists – whom he met while working on Balibo with Dili Allstars.

== Accolades ==
Stewart is the first recipient of the Essence of St Kilda essay award. He was awarded the Medal of the Order of Australia on Australia Day (26 January) 2020 for "service to the community, and to the performing arts."

== Bibliography ==
- Madden, Evonne; Layzell, Anita; Leek, Lisa; Stephens, Penny; Philbey, Martin; Stewart, Paulie (2021), Life after : a testament to human resilience, 60 Australians on coming to terms with grief, Affirm Press, ISBN 978-1-922626-40-0
- Stewart, Paulie (2022), Paulie Stewart: All the Rage, Melbourne Books, ISBN 978-1-922779-01-4
