= Lobby Loyde =

Australian guitarist, songwriter and producer (1941–2007)

- Lobby Loyde performing "G.O.D."; ABC-TV's GTK, 21 July 1971

Background information
- Also known as: John Barrie Lyde, Barry Lyde, Lobby Lyde
- Born: John Baslington Lyde; 18 May 1941; Longreach, Queensland, Australia
- Origin: Brisbane, Queensland, Australia
- Died: 21 April 2007 (aged 65) Box Hill, Victoria, Australia
- Genres: R&B, rock, psychedelic rock, hard rock, blues
- Occupations: Musician; songwriter; producer
- Instruments: Guitar, bass guitar, piano
- Years active: 1959–2006
- Labels: Soundtrack, Sunshine, Festival, Infinity
- Formerly of: Purple Hearts, Wild Cherries, Billy Thorpe & the Aztecs, Coloured Balls, Rose Tattoo

Lobby Loyde (born John Baslington Lyde, 18 May 1941 – 21 April 2007), also known as John Barrie Lyde or Barry Lyde, was an Australian rock music guitarist, songwriter and producer.

He was a member of two 1960s groups: Purple Hearts, which had a Top 40 hit with "Early in the Morning" in 1966, and Wild Cherries with their hit "That's Life" in 1967. He became a leading figure in the 1970s Australian pub rock scene, particularly as a member of Billy Thorpe & the Aztecs on their No. 8 album, The Hoax Is Over (1971) and Coloured Balls for a Top 20 album Ball Power (1973). He was briefly a member of Rose Tattoo during 1979 to 1980. His solo work includes the psychedelic album, Plays with George Guitar (1971) and the space opera, Beyond Morgia: The Labyrinths of Klimster (2007).

Known for his plectrum guitar technique, Loyde inspired a legion of Australian musicians, and he was also cited as an influence by international musicians such as Kurt Cobain and Henry Rollins. He was inducted into the ARIA Hall of Fame in 2006 where his Rose Tattoo band mate, Angry Anderson acknowledged his prowess, "More than anyone else, Lobby helped create the Australian guitar sound, long before Angus [Young] or Billy Thorpe or The Angels or Rose Tattoo. Lobby inspired Australian bands to step forward and play as loud and aggressively as they could." Loyde died of lung cancer in April 2007 and was survived by his children, Shane, Frances, Rebecca, Vyvyan and Lucinda, and his second wife Debbie Nankervis.

== Early years and Barry Lyde ==
Lobby Loyde was born as John Baslington Lyde on 18 May 1941 in Longreach, Queensland, he later wrote music as John Barrie Lyde and initially performed as Barry Lyde. His mother played classical piano and his father, a builder by trade, was a multi-instrumentalist – drums, harmonica, horn, piano and trumpet – in an 18-piece R&B band and had a large collection of jazz and blues music records. His sister was not interested in a musical career but Loyde learned classical music, on piano and violin, as a child. He built his first guitar out of wood when a teenager and his father gave him a Fender electric guitar and amp. As Barry Lyde, he joined Brisbane group, Devil's Disciples, in the late 1950s as a guitarist. In 1963, he joined The Stilettos, which played The Shadows-styled instrumentals. Growing up nearby, he competed in talent quests against other Brisbane acts – Bee Gees and Billy Thorpe.

In 1964, as lead guitarist, Barry Lyde joined a R&B group, The Impacts, which had formed a year earlier with Bob Dames on bass guitar, Mick Hadley on vocals, Fred Pickard on rhythm guitar and Adrian Redmond on drums. The Impacts supported The Rolling Stones 1965 tour of Australia and when they arrived in Melbourne found another group with the same name, so were renamed The Purple Hearts. They were named for the pep-pills (see purple hearts) favoured by band members – not the US military decoration of same name (see Purple Heart). Their debut recordings were covers of "Gloria" and Graham Bond's "Long Legged Baby" cut to acetate disc in 1965 at Soundtrack Studios, Brisbane. A different version of "Long Legged Baby" was issued as their debut single on Sunshine Records later in 1965. Their highest charting single, "Early in the Morning", was released in October 1966 and peaked at No. 24 on Go-Set's National Top 40. The band briefly relocated to Sydney then moved on to Melbourne. They had issued three other singles and an extended play, The Sound of the Purple Hearts before splitting on 23 January 1967. "Bob Dames started calling me Lobby because I would lobby the fuck out of people ... My last name's' L-y-d-e, so he put the 'o' in because it rhymed better". 'Lobby' is also used in Queensland for a freshwater crayfish, while other Australians would say 'yabby'.

== Wild Cherries and Aztecs ==
In January 1967, as Lobby Loyde, he joined the second incarnation of Melbourne band Wild Cherries on lead guitar. The rest of the line-up was Keith Barber on drums, Peter Eddey on bass guitar, Les Gilbert on organ and Danny Robinson on vocals. They had been an R&B and jazz group but moved into psychedelic rock. Loyde, as John Barrie Lyde, wrote most of the band's four singles for Festival Records including "Krome Plated Yabby" from June 1967. "That's Life" issued in November was their only charting single when it reached the Top 40 in January 1968. In October, Loyde left Wild Cherries to join Billy Thorpe & the Aztecs.

Loyde had met Thorpe, in his school days, in the Brisbane suburb of Salisbury, Queensland. In August 1968, Thorpe was in Melbourne with the Aztecs being Paul Wheeler on bass guitar and Jimmy Thompson on drums. Thorpe took up lead guitar as well as lead vocals. Loyde joined in October and encouraged Thorpe's 'new' Aztecs to develop a heavier sound. By July 1970, Warren "Pig" Morgan had joined on piano and backing vocals and they recorded, The Hoax Is Over, which was released in January 1971 and Loyde had left. "Under Loyde's influence, The Aztecs spearheaded the burgeoning blues, boogie and heavy rock movement of the day. It was on that foundation that Billy Thorpe earned his position as the unassailable king of Australia's early 1970s rock scene".

By July 1971, Loyde with Johnny Dick on drums and Teddy Toi on bass guitar (both ex-Fanny Adams, Billy Thorpe & the Aztecs) performed as Wild Cherries, their set included "G.O.D." (aka "Guitar Overdose"). A five-minute version of "G.O.D." was broadcast on 21 July, on Australian Broadcasting Corporation music TV series GTK, and includes footage of Loyde playing 'George', his guitar. The band released a single, "I Am the Sea" on the Havoc label in 1971 and performed at the Sunbury Pop Festival in January 1972 but disbanded in February.

== Coloured Balls ==
Lobby Loyde formed the psychedelic/hard/blues rock group Coloured Balls in March 1972 with Andrew Fordham on guitar and vocals, Janis Miglans on bass guitar and Trevor Young on drums. Their first single, "Liberate Rock", had been recorded by Loyde with Aztecs' members, Gil Mathews (on drums), Morgan and Wheeler as studio musicians – it was issued in August. During late 1972, the original line-up of Coloured Balls recorded material for an album, Rock Your Arse Off, but it was not released until May 1976 as The First Supper Last (Or Scenes We Didn't Get to See) by independent label, Rainbird.

In January 1973, Coloured Balls teamed with guest vocalists Thorpe and Leo de Castro at the Sunbury Pop Festival, their performance was released in November as the "Help Me" / "Rock Me Baby" track on the live album, Summer Jam. The album included Coloured Balls' 16-minute version of "G.O.D.". Fordham had been replaced on guitar by Ian Millar early in the year. Coloured Balls released three singles including "Mess of the Blues" which reached the Top 40 in October. They supported Marc Bolan & T. Rex on their Australian tour. Coloured Balls released their debut studio album, Ball Power, in December on EMI, which peaked at No. 13 on the Go-Set National Top 20 albums chart in February 1974. In January, Coloured Balls played at the Sunbury Pop Festival alongside hard rockers, Buster Brown, which included Angry Anderson on vocals and Phil Rudd on drums.

Coloured Balls' second album, Heavy Metal Kid spawned the Top 40 hit, "Love You Babe" in June 1974. Along with Thorpe, Madder Lake, Buster Brown and Chain, they were supported by suburban-based sharpie gangs. Coloured Balls had fully adopted the Melbourne 1970s sharpies' culture which included wearing chisel toed shoes, jeans, tight-fitting cardigans (expensive hand-made designs by Conti or Stag), crew-cut hair style with 'rats' tails' and most sported tattoos with a spider's web on the neck being popular. Their music was influenced by U.S. bands, MC5 and The Flamin' Groovies. Pubs and town halls became battlegrounds between rival sharpie gangs. Available venues became rare and media reports accused Loyde of encouraging the violence of some sharpies. Nick Ellenford, a member of the Heidelberg sharps, recalled "[Loyde] played with a cigarette stuck permanently to his bottom lip and always appeared to be drunk or stoned ... he casually walked behind a speaker midsong, threw up, then returned to the front of the stage without missing a beat". Coloured Balls disbanded at the end of 1974 and Loyde returned to solo work. Trevor Young died of an unspecified cancer in 2014.

== Solo, Rose Tattoo and other projects ==
Lobby Loyde had left the Aztecs early in 1971 and worked on his debut solo album, Plays with George Guitar, with Johnny Dick and Teddy Toi. It was issued in September and "remains a progressive rock milestone, one of the most remarkable heavy guitar records of the period".

Loyde's first record production was the debut album for Buster Brown, Something to Say, which was released by Mushroom Records in December 1974. After Coloured Balls disbanded, he attempted to form a band with Buster Brown's Anderson during 1975. As a solo artist, Loyde issued "Do You Believe in Magic?" in December and followed with the critically acclaimed and instrumentally based album Obsecration in May 1976. Loyde formed Southern Electric with former band mates, Fordham and Miglans, joined by John Dey on keyboards, Mándu on vocals and James Thompson on drums (ex-Billy Thorpe & the Aztecs).

Loyde had written a science-fiction novel, Beyond Morgia: The Labyrinths of Klimster, for a proposed film. In June 1976, he recorded an accompanying concept soundtrack album, mixed and engineered by Tony Cohen, with Southern Electric over the course of a weekend. The manuscript was destroyed by Loyde after the book and related film project were rejected. In 2007, the master tapes of the album were found and it was released in Australia on Aztec Records.

From late 1976, Loyde lived in the United Kingdom, unhappy with the Australian media's continued linking of his music to violent sharpie brawls. In London, he unsuccessfully attempted to get Obsecretion released and Southern Electric's new material recorded. He ran Front of House sound for new wave bands including Doll by Doll. He returned to Australia in 1979 to form Lobby Loyde with Sudden Electric. He recruited former band mates Mándu and Matthews and they were joined by Gavin Carroll on bass guitar. Sydney's radio station, 2JJ broadcast a live-to-air performance in mid-1979 which was recorded as Live with Dubs – the vocals were re-done by Mándu and guest vocalist Anderson (then with Rose Tattoo) – and released in 1980 by Mushroom Records.

In October 1979, Loyde joined Rose Tattoo on bass guitar, the line-up was Anderson on vocals, Mick Cocks on guitars, Dallas Royall on drums and Peter Wells on guitars. During his brief tenure, they recorded "Legalise Realise" which was released as an independent single in March 1980, backed with the track "Bong on Aussie" by country singer Colin Paterson, to publicise a campaign to legalise marijuana. They toured the United States, recorded an unreleased album in Los Angeles, and then toured Europe (including UK), but by September Loyde had left and earlier bass guitarist Gordie Leach had returned.

Loyde turned his attention to more production work, including albums for X, The Sunnyboys, Machinations and Painters and Dockers.

== Later years ==
In 1990, Lobby Loyde was bass guitarist for Dirt with Jex Byron on vocals (ex–Olympic Sideburns), Mick Holmes on guitar (Zimmermen), Leach on bass guitar (Rose Tattoo) and Cal MacAlpine on drums (Chosen Few). Fish Tree Mother was his new band in 1997 with Bruce Aitken, Peter Coomber and Graham Duncan. On 14 November 1998, with Billy Thorpe & the Aztecs, Loyde appeared at the Mushroom 25 Concert on guitar for "Most People I Know" and "Ooh Poo Pah Doo".

Long Way to the Top was a 2001 Australian Broadcasting Corporation (ABC) six-part documentary on the history of Australian rock and roll from 1956 to the modern era. Loyde featured on "Episode 2: Ten Pound Rocker 1963–1968" broadcast on 22 August, where he discussed the early 1960s club and disco scene in Melbourne. Purple Hearts' "Just a Little Bit" was used on the episode's soundtrack. "Episode 3: Billy Killed the Fish", broadcast on 29 August, featured interviews with Loyde, Michael Chugg (manager / promoter) and Thorpe. They described their Sunbury festival experiences and the development of pub rock in Australia. Wild Cherries' "G.O.D." was used for that episode. During August 2002, promoters Chugg and Kevin Jacobsen with Thorpe as co-producer, organised a related concert tour, Long Way to the Top. Concerts included Loyde performing with Coloured Balls. Performances at two Sydney shows in September were recorded, broadcast on ABC-TV and subsequently released on DVD in December. The DVD included an interview with Loyde and the Coloured Balls and their performance of "G.O.D."/"Human Being" and "Liberate Rock".

Purple Hearts reformed briefly in 2005 for a reunion concert series with the 1964 line-up of Dames on bass guitar, Hadley on vocals and harmonica, Loyde on guitar and Pickard on rhythm guitar supplemented by Craig Claxton on lead guitar and Keith Megson on drums.

In 2005, Loyde was diagnosed with lung cancer and a benefit concert, in Melbourne (at which he also played) raised $90,000 for medical costs. In August 2006, Loyde re-joined Rose Tattoo to replace slide guitarist Peter Wells, who had died of cancer. In 1980, Loyde had recorded an as-yet-unreleased album (as from June 2008) in Los Angeles when a member of Rose Tattoo, with Billy Thorpe guesting. He was inducted into the ARIA Hall of Fame in August, alongside Rose Tattoo, Divinyls, Icehouse, Daddy Cool and Helen Reddy. Bandmate, Angry Anderson of Rose Tattoo described Loyde's influence:

More than anyone else, Lobby helped create the Australian guitar sound, long before Angus [Young] or Billy Thorpe or The Angels or Rose Tattoo. Lobby inspired Australian bands to step forward and play as loud and aggressively as they could. People are still trying to copy it today.

The last album Loyde produced and performed on was The Odyssey by Michael Fein, which was released on 6 October 2008.

On 21 April 2007, Lobby Loyde died, from lung cancer, in Box Hill, Melbourne, aged 65.

== Personal life ==
Lobby Loyde's first marriage to Beverley Gibson produced a son, Shane Lyde (born 1966).

When in London in 1977, he met Debbie Nankervis (born 1953), a model and actress, who later became an advertising representative. They eventually married and were together for 27 years. Their children are Frances (born July 1982), Rebecca (born September 1984), Vyvyan (born August 1986) and Lucinda (born March 1988). At the time of his death from lung cancer, on 21 April 2007, he had separated from Nankervis.

== Discography ==
=== Albums ===
- Lobby Loyde – Plays with George Guitar (Infinity, September 1971)
- Coloured Balls – Summer Jam (November 1973)
- Coloured Balls – Ball Power (EMI, December 1973)
- Coloured Balls – Heavy Metal Kid (EMI, 1974)
- Lobby Loyde – Obsecration (Rainbird, May 1976)
- Lobby Loyde with Sudden Electric – Live with Dubs (Mushroom, 1980)
- Lobby Loyde – Beyond Morgia: The Labyrinths of Klimster (recorded 1976, released Aztec Records, 2007)

Lobby Loyde - "Summer Jam...Lobby's Last" (Aztec Records, 2018)

=== Singles ===
Year	Title	Peak chart positions		Album
Year	Title	Go-Set	KMR	Album
1972	"Liberate Rock"	—	39	'Non-album single'
1973	"Mess of the Blues"	38	—	'Non-album single'
1973	"Flash"	—	—	Ball Power
1973	"Mr Mean Mouth"	—	—	'Non-album single'
1974	"Love You Babe"	38	—	Heavy Metal Kid
"—" denotes a recording that did not chart or was not released in that territory.

=== Producer ===
Lobby Loyde has produced the following works:

- Buster Brown – Something to Say (1974)
- Doll by Doll (1979)
- X – X-Aspirations (1979)
- The Sunnyboys – The Sunnyboys (Extended Play, December 1980)
- Machinations – "Average Inadequacy" (26 August 1981)
- The Sunnyboys – The Sunnyboys (September 1981)
- Kevin Borich – Shy Boys Shy Girls (EP, 1981)
- Machinations – Machinations (EP, December 1981)
- Flaming Hands – "Wake Up Screaming" (1981)
- Tablewaiters – "Between the Lines" (1981)
- Sardine v – "Sabotage" (1981)
- The Sunnyboys – Individuals (May 1982)
- Kevin Borich – "Getting So Excited" (1982)
- Models – "On" (August 1982)
- I Am Joe's Music – I Am Joe's Music (1983)
- Machinations – Esteem (April 1983)
- Gravity Pirates – This Way to the Cargo Cult (EP, 1983)
- Painters and Dockers – Love Planet (1984)
- Hoi Polloi (1984)
- Spectres Revenge – "No Moon at Midnight" (1985)
- The Arctic Circles – Angel (EP, 1985)
- The Shindiggers – Beat Is Back (EP, 1985)
- Depression – Australia Australia (1985)
- X – At Home with You (1985)
- Urban Tribe (1987)
- Sensational Rocket 88s – Get Real Gone! (LP, 1987)
- Large #12's – Dance the Demon Out (EP, 1988)
- Painters and Dockers – Kiss My Art (August 1988)
- X – And More (1989)
- The Zimmermen – Way Too Casual (1989)
- Michael Fein – The Odyssey (6 October 2008)

== Notes ==
1. For names, Lobby Loyde, John Baslingtion Lyde and Barry Lyde see McFarlane. For John Barrie Lyde see Australasian Performing Right Association search result for song writer and performer of "Liberate Rock". For birth year and birth place see McFarlane. For full date and place of birth see Swift.

== Awards and nominations ==
=== ARIA Music Awards ===
The ARIA Music Awards is an annual awards ceremony that recognises excellence, innovation, and achievement across all genres of Australian music. They commenced in 1987. Loyde was inducted into the Hall of Fame in 2006.

Year	Nominee / work	Award	Result
2006	himself	ARIA Hall of Fame	inductee
