= And More =

Studio album by X
- Released: 1988
- Genre: Rock, punk
- Label: White Label Records
- Producer: Lobby Loyde

X chronology
At Home with You (1985)	And More (1988)

And More is the third and final studio album from Australian rock band, X. The album was released on the Mushroom Records alternative subsidiary White Label. The album contains re-recordings of the band's early songs "Home Is Where the Floor Is" and "I Don't Wanna Go Out" with a new studio recording of the live favourite "El Salvador". At the time, Mushroom Records did little to promote the album and it is rumoured that the band trashed the offices of Mushroom Records because of lack of support for the band. The band was later dropped from the label and as of 2010, the album is currently unavailable in any format.

== Track listing ==
1. "Home Is Where the Floor Is" (re-recording)
2. "I Don't Wanna Go Out (re-recording)
3. "Dream Baby"
4. "And More"
5. "Getting Wet"
6. "Criticize"
7. "Sad Days Girl"
8. "El Salvador"
9. "You Say You Love Me"
10. "Here's Looking at You"
