= Goddess of the Night =

Goddess of the Night may refer to:

- Goddess of the Night (ship), a Destiny-class cruise ship
- Goddess of the Night (Hurrian), a deity worshiped in the Hurrian kingdom of Kizzuwatna
- Nyx, Greek goddess of the night
- Oxomoco, Aztec deity, also known as the goddess of the night
- Nut (goddess), ancient Egyptian goddess of the night
- Goddess of the Night (2000), the first volume in the novel series, Daughters of the Moon
- "Goddess of the Night", a song on Children of the Sun (Billy Thorpe album) (1979)
