= Halfway Around the World (disambiguation) =

"Halfway Around the World" is a 2001 song by A-Teens.

Halfway Around the World or Halfway 'Round the World may also refer to

- Halfway Around the World: An Improbable Journey, a 1983 book by Gavin Young
- Halfway Round the World, a 2001 novel by Christine Harris
- "Halfway 'Round the World", a song by Carly Simon from Letters Never Sent
- "Halfway 'Round the World", a song by X from At Home with You
