= X-Aspirations =

Studio album by X
- Released: 1980
- Recorded: 1979
- Genre: Rock, Punk
- Label: X Music (1979 release); Aztec Music (2009 reissue)
- Producer: Lobby Loyde

X chronology
| X-Aspirations (1980) | At Home with You (1985) |

X-Aspirations, sometimes simply called Aspirations, is the debut studio album from Australian rock band X. It was recorded in a single afternoon in 1979 at Trafalgar Studios in the band's hometown of Sydney and released the following year on the band's own label. In October 2010, X-Aspirations was listed in the book 100 Best Australian Albums.

== Reception ==
Trouser Press said the album "couples deep riff repetitive rhythms with scattershot guitar and anguished vocals for a 'punk' LP unlike any other, appropriate for a band as distant and isolated from the media focus as one could conceivably get without leaving the planet."

== Original LP track listing ==
1. "Suck Suck"
2. "Present"
3. "Simulated Lovers"
4. "Police"
5. "Revolution"
6. "Turn My Head"
7. "Good on Ya Baby"
8. "Delinquent Cars"
9. "I Don't Wanna Go Out"
10. "Dipstick"
11. "It Must Be Me"
12. "Coat of Green"
13. "Waiting"
14. "Batman"

== Reissues ==
The original album has been re-released numerous times, often with bonus tracks taken from the band's 1984 single. The short-lived Australian Ultimate Record Company was the first to reissue the album on vinyl and compact disc with the John Lennon song "Mother" as the lead track. The CD version also inserted the B-side "Halfway 'Round the World" midway through the album. In 1992 the noise rock label Amphetamine Reptile Records was the first to release Aspirations in the United States. More recent re-releases either omit the single, or tack it onto the end of the CD as bonus tracks, including an alternate take of "Mother".

== Personnel ==
=== Musicians ===
- Steve Lucas – guitar, vocals
- Ian Rilen – bass
- Steve Cafiero – drums

=== Technical ===
- Lobby Loyde – producer
- Cover by Kit
