= Mándu =

- Birth name: Chris Moraitis
- Born: Queensland
- Origin: Melbourne, Victoria, Australia
- Genres: Rock
- Occupation: Singer
- Instrument: Vocals
- Years active: 1973–1980, 1985
- Labels: Image/Astor

Chris Moraitis, who performed as Mándu, was an Australian rock music vocalist. He released his debut solo album, To the Shores of His Heaven, in 1974. He joined Lobby Loyde's Southern Electric group and was recorded on two of their albums, Obsecration (May 1976) and Live with Dubs (live album, 1980). According to Australian musicologist, Ian McFarlane, Mándu had "a distinctive and emotional voice" and his solo album, "stands as a worthwhile period piece, a work graced with elegant songs, soaring arrangements and fine musicianship." However, in 1980 he "disappeared from view, re-emerging briefly during the mid-1980s with a band called Mándu Bándu."

== Biography ==
Mándu (Chris Moraitis) moved to Melbourne from Queensland in the early 1970s. He issued a concept album, To the Shores of His Heaven, in 1974 using studio musicians: Steve Cooney on mandolin and guitar, Phil Manning on guitar, Barry Sullivan on bass guitar, Peter Sullivan on keyboards and Gary Young on drums. It was recorded at Melbourne's Armstrong Studios and produced by Ern Rose for Image Records/Astor Records.

Ian McFarlane, an Australian musicologist, felt that, "the cosmic concept album ... stands as a worthwhile period piece, a work graced with elegant songs, soaring arrangements and fine musicianship." Mándu toured Australia with a backing band of Cooney, Peter Sullivan, Bob Bickerton on drums (ex-Rock Granite and the Profiles), Mike Clarke on bass guitar (ex-Skylight) and Greg Cook on guitar (ex-Cam-Pact, the Mixtures, Skylight). The album was retitled, We Ran Across the Sky, and reissued in 1980. A bonus track, "Gimme Shelter", a cover version of the Rolling Stones' single was added to a remastered and reissued version, To the Shores of His Heaven, in February 2008 via Aztec Music.

Mándu joined Australian rock guitarist Lobby Loyde's group Southern Electric, and sang on their album, Obsecration (May 1976). He left for the United Kingdom and returned to Melbourne to record that group's live album, Live with Dubs (1980). McFarlane writes that he subsequently "disappeared from view, re-emerging briefly during the mid-1980s with a band called Mándu Bándu." He observed that the artist "was something of an enigma and a sadly overlooked talent. He had a distinctive and emotional voice, but only issued one album that was received with bemused indifference."

== Discography ==
=== Studio albums ===
List of albums, with Australian chart positions
Title	Album details	Peak chart positions
Title	Album details	AUS
To The Shores of His Heaven	Released: 1974; Format: LP; Label: Image (ILP743)	42

=== Singles ===
Year	Title	Album
1974	"We Ran Across the Sky"	To The Shores of His Heaven
1975	"Gimme Shelter"	To The Shores of His Heaven
