= Dili Allstars =

Australian/East Timorese reggae/ska band

The Dili Allstars
- Origin: Melbourne, Victoria, Australia
- Genres: Reggae, ska
- Years active: 1992–present
- Labels: Mushroom Records, Shock Records, ABC Music
- Members: Paulie Stewart; Paulo Almeida; Colin Badger; Osme Gonsalves; Gil Santos; Nelito Riberio; Zeca Mesquita; Mark Grunden; Dave Pace; Clare Murrell
- Past members: Paul Calvert; Jenny Pineapple; Colin Buckler; Sonya Parkinson; Tim Stewart; Ross Hannaford; Dan Golding

The Dili Allstars are an Australian-East Timorese reggae and ska band based in Melbourne. They are one of the leading voices of support for the East Timorese people and a popular musical group. The band has released two albums; a special edition Portuguese tour CD; an EP titled Increase the Peace; and also tracks for the ARIA Award-winning Balibo soundtrack album, and the Australian Canadian telemovie Answered By Fire.

The band has also contributed tracks to the Kids Under Cover, This Is The Place for a Song, Love From A Short A Distance, All in the Family and Liberdade benefit albums.

== History ==
=== Formation and early years ===
The Dili Allstars were formed when Paul Stewart (of the band Painters and Dockers) contacted East Timorese musician Gil Santos to record a song to protest the capture of East Timorese resistance leader Xanana Gusmão by Indonesian armed forces in the early nineties. This song was a version of Rose Tattoo's 'We Can't Be Beaten', sung in both Tetum and English. Both Santos and Stewart had had a long involvement with the East Timor struggle as they had lost a father and a brother, respectively, in the Indonesian invasion of 1975.

Before the 1999 Independence referendum, the band recorded the original track 'Liberdade' and six other songs in response to hearing that the Governor of East Timor was playing pro-Indonesian songs at Dili airport. With the help of Melbourne University students, 500 tapes were smuggled into East Timor. The songs had a wide exposure during the lead up to the election, and remain strong in the Timorese memory today. After the referendum, Gusmão visited Melbourne and joined the Allstars on stage at the National Tennis Centre. At this stage, the band included current members Paul Stewart, Gil Santos and Paulo Almeida. However, it also included drummer Steve Morrison (who stood in for and recorded in place of Colin Buckler while he was overseas), trombonist/vocalist Sonja Parkinson, saxophonists Billy Abbott & Jenny Pineapple, keyboardist Cheryl, guitarist/backing vocalist Paul Calvert and bassist Nelito Ribero.

=== Further support for East Timor and the Tour of Duty ===
'Liberdade' was later included on a Mushroom Records compilation (also titled 'Liberdade') which the band helped to compile. This compilation also featured Midnight Oil, Crowded House, and Yothu Yindi, and went on to raise $100,000 for East Timor. Two further compilation albums were made by the band – 'Love From a Short Distance' and 'All in the Family', both of which also raised hundreds of thousands of dollars for East Timor.

Because of the band's long term involvement with East Timor, the Dili Allstars were invited to appear with popular Australian performers John Farnham and Kylie Minogue at the Tour of Duty concert, which was attended by thousands and viewed by many more on Australian television. Shortly after the concert, the band released its first major album, Hanoin, which included 'Liberdade', 'Freedom' and The Living End song 'Revolution Regained', which The Living End had requested the Allstars record a version of, in which ended up on The Living End's single Dirty Man Significantly, Paul Calvert leaves the line up to be replaced by guitarist Colin Badger. Badger is to become the band's musical director overseeing most of the band's recording sessions. The band later toured Portugal as guests of the Portuguese Communist Party.

=== "Viva La Musica" ===
The band consolidated their position with the 2004 release, Viva La Musica. By this stage, Parkinson was no longer playing with the band, and drummer Buckler had been replaced by Mark Grunden. The album remained true to the band's protest roots ('Rise Up', 'Peace & Unity' and 'Advance Australia Where?'), their East Timorese heritage (with traditional Timorese song 'O Hele Le' included as the first track and as a reprise) and their growing reputation as a party band ('That Girl', 'Thank You Mama').

=== Answered By Fire and the "Increase the Peace" tour ===
The Dili Allstars' profile was raised further when band members acted in, and provided music for the two-part, 2006 Australian/Canadian mini-series Answered by Fire. The series dramatised the conflicts surrounding the 1999 East Timor referendum and the struggle for independence.

Driven by the civil crisis in both East Timor and the Northern Territory Aboriginal communities, the Dili Allstars released Increase the Peace in 2006. The album 'calls on an end to the violence with a plea to be careful and calm'. The accompanying tour of East Timor and the Northern Territory, however, was postponed as a result of the heightening violence in Timor and member illness. This period also saw a change of drummers, with Tim Stewart joining, and a change of bassists, with Dan Golding completing the line-up. After a long period of touring and performance, Dili Allstars went into hibernation as founder Paul Stewart recovered from serious illness and the band saw yet another reshuffle as a number of members left to form Sol Nation.

=== Balibo ===
After Paulo Almeida, Colin Badger, Tim Stewart and Daniel Golding formed world music outfit Sol Nation, Paul Stewart and Gil Santos were employed as musical consultants on the 2009 film, Balibo. The Dili Allstars then performed at East Timor's first ever media awards, along with Osme Gonsalves and Mali from Galaxy Band.

A new line-up of the Dili Allstars, including ex-Daddy Cool guitarist Ross Hannaford, original members Nelito Riberio (bass), and Mark Grunden (drums), Painters and Dockers' trumpet player Dave Pace, and sax player Clare Murrell, Balibo movie actor and rapper Osme Gonsalves, percussionist Zeca Mesquita, Gil Santos and Paulie Stewart went into the ABC studios at Southbank in Melbourne to record a new version of the Graham Parker punk classic "Hey Lord Don't Ask Me Questions". Produced by Chris Thompson, this was included on the Balibo movie soundtrack.

In his role as musical consultant, Stewart later accepted the 2009 ARIA award for "Best Soundtrack" album.

In 2010, members of The Dili Allstars visited Papua New Guinea and USA to talk about the band's work. Band members Paulie Stewart and Gil Santos also attended the São Paulo Film Festival in Brazil to support the screening of Balibo. It was later voted by the public as "most popular" film at the film festival. Later that year, ABC Music approached the band to release a career retrospective, The Best of the Dili Allstars.

2020 Members of Dili Allstars met up with Governor General Sir Peter Cosgrove former head of Australian Army to celebrate 20th anniversary of the TOUR OF DUTY concert held for Australian and New Zealand troops.

== Performances ==
The Dili Allstars are scheduled to play at WOMADelaide in March 2023.

== Members ==
- Paulo Almeida: Vocals
- Paulie Stewart: Vocals
- Osme Gonsalves: Vocals
- Gil Santos: Keyboards, guitar
- Colin Badger: Lead guitar
- Jose" Zeca" Mesquita: Percussion, vocals
- Mark Grunden: Drums, vocals
- Nelito Riberio: Bass
- Dave Pace: Trumpet
- Clare Murrell: Saxophone

== Discography ==
=== Hanoin (2001) ===
1. Brother
2. I'll Be Gone
3. Black Angel
4. Freedom
5. Alive
6. Revolution Regained
7. Dengue Fever
8. Liberdade
9. Stranded

=== Viva La Musica (2004) ===
1. O Hele Le
2. Runaway
3. Thank You Mama
4. Peace & Unity
5. That Girl
6. Nothing Tastes Better Than The Neighbour's Chicken
7. Rise Up
8. Innocent Child
9. Advance Australia Where?
10. Beautiful Smile
11. Have You Ever Been Blown Ashore?
12. Sempre Contigo
13. O Hele Le (Reprise)

=== Increase the Peace (2006) ===
1. Increase the Peace
2. No Woman, No Cry
3. O Hele Le
4. Cool World
5. My Soul Flew Out the Window

=== BALIBO soundtrack (2009) ===
1. Liberdade
2. Hey Lord Don't Ask Me Questions
