= Billy Thorpe and the Aztecs =

Australian rock band

- Origin: Sydney, Australia
- Genres: Hard rock; beat; blues rock; pop rock
- Years active: 1963–1973; 2002
- Label: Albert
- Past members: Billy Thorpe; Col Baigent; John "Bluey" Watson; Valentine Jones; Vince Melouney; Tony Barber; Dennis Cuthel; Gil "Rathead" Matthews; Lobby Loyde; Brian Bakewell

Billy Thorpe and the Aztecs were an Australian rock band formed in Sydney, New South Wales, in 1963. They were active in two incarnations, the first as a beat band from 1963–1967, and as a hard rock band from 1968 to 1973. They emerged in 1964 with their cover of "Poison Ivy", which kept the Beatles from the top spot of the Sydney charts during the latter's Australian tour. They enjoyed further success through 1965 when the original members quit after a financial dispute.

After a brief solo career, Thorpe resurrected the Aztecs name in 1968 with a new line-up and a heavier rock direction influenced by guitarist Lobby Loyde. By the 1970s, the new Aztecs had become one of the most popular hard rock bands in the country with appearances at the Sunbury Pop Festival and hit songs such as "Most People I Know (Think That I'm Crazy)", before disbanding in 1973. Thorpe died from a heart attack in Sydney on 28 February 2007.

== History ==
=== 1963–1968: Beginning ===
Originally a four-piece instrumental group called the Vibratones who had released a surf instrumental single, "Expressway" b/w "Man of Mystery", they formed in Sydney in 1963. With the advent of the Merseybeat sound, they added a lead singer, Billy Thorpe. His powerful voice and showmanship (which eventually made him one of the most popular and respected rock performers in Australian music), completed the original line-up, which consisted of drummer Col Baigent, bassist John "Bluey" Watson and guitarists Brian Bakewell and Vince Maloney (who as Vince Melouney, later became a member of the Bee Gees). Brian Bakewell left the band shortly after Billy Thorpe had joined and was later replaced by Tony Barber.

The group broke through in mid-1964 with their cover of the Leiber and Stoller classic "Poison Ivy", which famously kept the Beatles from the No. 1 spot on the Sydney charts at the very moment that the group was making its first and only tour of Australia—a feat which resulted in Thorpe being invited to meet the Fab Four at their hotel. Over the next twelve months the band reigned supreme as the most popular 'beat' group in Australia, scoring further hits with the songs "Mashed Potato", "Sick and Tired" and "Somewhere Over the Rainbow", until they were eclipsed by the emergence of the Easybeats in 1965. The band's recording success confirmed Albert Productions, their recording company, with its worldwide distribution deals through EMI and Parlophone, as one of the most important in Australia's embryonic pop industry.

During 1965 the original Aztecs quit after a financial dispute, so Thorpe put together a new five-piece version consisting of drummer Johnny Dick, pianist Jimmy Taylor, guitarists Colin Risbey and Mike Downes and NZ-born bassist Teddy Toi. This group performed until 1966, scoring further hits with "Twilight Time", "Hallelujah I Love Her So", "Baby, Hold Me Close", "Love Letters" and "Word For Today".

Thorpe went solo in 1967 and for a brief time hosted his own TV show, It's All Happening, but personal problems and a widely publicised bankruptcy brought this phase of his career to an end in 1968.

=== 1969–1970: New style and line-up ===
In 1969, Thorpe decided to try England, after being offered a recording deal by the Australian-born, London-based impresario Robert Stigwood, who had risen to become manager of The Bee Gees and Cream. While rehearsing a backing band in Melbourne that would form the basis for a new Aztecs, the guitarist unexpectedly dropped out, leaving Thorpe to assume lead guitar role at short notice. It marked another turning point in his career and from this point on Thorpe played lead guitar in The Aztecs as well as continuing as lead vocalist. His planned six-week stay in Melbourne soon stretched into months and eventually Thorpe decided to remain in Australia and re-launch his career.

Thorpe himself openly acknowledges that this new 'heavy' version of the Aztecs owes much to 'guitar hero' Lobby Loyde. Lloyde already had a cult following due to his stints in two of the most original Australian bands of the 1960s, The Purple Hearts and Wild Cherries. While his stint in the new Aztecs was short (from October 1968 to January 1971), his musical influence proved crucial in steering Thorpe in a completely new direction, and he strongly encouraged Thorpe to keep playing guitar.

The new Aztecs' blues-based heavy-rock repertoire was dramatically different in style from the original group, and they quickly became famous (or notorious) for the ear-splitting volume at which they played. Thorpe had also drastically changed his appearance—he grew a beard, often wore his now shoulder-length hair braided in a pigtail, and he had long since traded the tailored suits for jeans and T-shirts. Needless to say this did not endear him to people who came to the shows expecting the 'old' Billy Thorpe of the "Poison Ivy" era, and this led to sometimes violent confrontations with disgruntled fans and promoters.

Their breakthrough recording was an ambitious album, The Hoax Is Over, recorded in September 1970 with new drummer Kevin Murphy. The album was an unequivocal signal of the Aztecs' new direction, containing only four tracks, three of which were Thorpe originals. The LP is dominated by two extended tracks: a version of Johnny "Guitar" Watson's "Gangster of Love", which clocked in at 24:35 and ran the entire length of Side 1 (an unprecedented move in Australian pop music) and Thorpe's own "Mississippi" which ran 19'35". According to Thorpe, the band (which at this time comprising himself, Murphy, pianist Warren Morgan, Lobby Loyde and bassist Paul Wheeler), were all high on LSD and jammed continuously while engineer Ernie Rose just let the tapes roll. The result heralded the fully-fledged arrival of the new Aztecs and live shows at Melbourne venues consolidated the band's reputation and drew enthusiastic responses.

=== 1971–1973: "Most People I Know (Think That I'm Crazy)", Sunbury and break up ===
During 1971 they continued to win over Melbourne's audiences with their power-blues repertoire, A landmark event for the band took place on 13 June 1971. Now a four-piece following the departure of Loyde, the Aztecs (Thorpe, Morgan and Wheeler, with new drummer Gil "Rathead" Matthews) headlined a major concert at the Melbourne Town Hall before a capacity crowd of 5000. The evening's performance, including Morgan's commandeering of the town hall organ, was captured on the album Live at Melbourne Town Hall, and which has since become known for the group's deafening performance, which (it was claimed) cracked the windows of neighbouring buildings.

By contrast, the pastoral-sounding "The Dawn Song" was released in 1971. A moderate hit, it displayed the musical diversity of Thorpe and his colleagues at this time.

In early 1972 the Aztecs released what became their biggest hit, and Thorpe's signature tune – "Most People I Know (Think That I'm Crazy)", a song now widely regarded as one of the classics of Australian rock. It was a huge hit for the new Aztecs, peaking in the Go-Set National Top 40 Singles Chart at number 3 in May 1972; propelled to the top of charts by the band's triumphant appearance at the 1972 Sunbury Music Festival. Thorpe himself claimed this as a pivotal moment in the development of Australian music, thanks to the promoters' decision to feature an all-Australian line-up, rather than relying on imported stars.

"Most People I Know (Think That I'm Crazy)" was added to the National Film and Sound Archive's Sounds of Australia registry in 2008.

While by no means the first of Australia's outdoor rock festivals, Sunbury '72 has assumed the mantle of "Australia's Woodstock". It was held at the end of January 1972, over the Australia Day long weekend. The venue was a natural amphitheatre site on farmland near Sunbury, a rural town north of Melbourne, Victoria. The Aztecs shared billing with such other prominent acts as Spectrum/Murtceps, The La De Da's, Max Merritt & the Meteors, SCRA, Pirana, Greg Quill's Country Radio and many others.

Part of the Aztecs' set was issued on the double-album recording, Sunbury, and it was also captured on the film made of the event. A double-album collecting the Aztecs' full set, Aztecs Live at Sunbury was issued later in the year and this has recently been reissued on CD. In mint condition, the original LP release, with pop-up inserts, is much sought after by collectors today.

After the release of "Most People I Know" they released a follow-up single, "Believe It Just Like Me", which attacked local radio's preference for overseas material, but it failed to emulate the success of "Most People", which remains their best-known song.

The band repeated their festival success at Sunbury '73, and a record culled from this performance, Summer Jam, was released later in the year. They enjoyed another triumph by selling out the Myer Music Bowl in Melbourne, drawing an Australian crowd record of 200,000 people.

During 1973 Thorpe collaborated on a duo album with his long-time friend and colleague Warren "Pig" Morgan, the LP Thumpin' Pig and Puffin' Billy. Morgan and Thorpe also co-wrote and produced, with the Aztecs backing, a highly regarded single, "Looking Through a Window", for soul-blues singer Wendy Saddington.

In August, Thorpe switched record labels from the independent Havoc to the newly opened local arm of Atlantic Records, releasing "Movie Queen" and "Don't You Know You're Changing?" as solo singles of singles, although they featured most of the Aztecs line-up.

Late in 1973 the group mounted a band's farewell concert at the newly opened Sydney Opera House, becoming the first rock band to perform there. The concert was recorded and released as a double album, Steaming at the Opera House. The show consisted of three one-hour sets, the first acoustic, the second, an elaborately staged concept suite called "No More War". The third set was an all-in all-star jam, reuniting Thorpe with former bandmates Lobby Loyde, Kevin Murphy and Johnny Dick.

Before disbanding, the Aztecs recorded one more album for Atlantic, More Arse Than Class, after which Thorpe embarked on a solo career. He released several more solo albums in Australia before re-locating to the United States, where he embarked on a series of business ventures, including a successful toy company with his old bandmate Tony Barber.

=== After The Aztecs ===
In the late 1990s Billy Thorpe returned to Australia, where he was recognised as one of the elder statesmen of Australian music. In 1991 he was inducted into the ARIA Hall of Fame.

In 1998 Australia Post issued a special edition set of twelve stamps celebrating the early years of Australian Rock 'n' Roll, featuring Australian hit songs of the late 1950s, the 1960s and the early 1970s.

"Each of them said something about us, and told the rest of the world this is what popular culture sounds like, and it has an Australian accent."

A "Most People I Know" stamp was one of those in the set.

In 2002, he was one of the driving forces behind the successful TV and live concert series, It's A Long Way to the Top, a celebration of 40 years of Australian rock music. This was an occasion for him to bring together and perform with two versions of The Aztecs.

He was working on his album 'Tangier' at the time of his death. He was recording in Marrakesh at Marrakech Prod Recording Studio. Thorpe played his last gig at Westernport Hotel in San Remo, Victoria, on Sunday 25 February 2007. He died of a heart attack at St Vincent's Hospital, Sydney, in the early hours of 28 February 2007.

Gil Matthews runs the re-issue label Aztec Music. Their first release was Live at Sunbury by Billy Thorpe & the Aztecs.

== Discography ==
=== Studio albums ===
List of studio albums, with selected chart positions and certifications
Title	Album details	Peak chart positions
Title	Album details	AUS
Poison Ivy (with Johnny Noble)	Released: 1964; Label: Linda Lee (HL-31,391); Format: Vinyl; Also released in the United States in late 1964 by World Artists Records under the title Live at The Ad-Lib Club (credited simply to The Aztecs), featuring a modified tracklist and overdubbed audience applause to simulate a live performance.	—
Billy Thorpe and the Aztecs	Released: 1965; Label: Parlophone, EMI Music (PMCO 7525); Format: Vinyl	—
Don't You Dig This Kind of Beat	Released: 1966; Label: Parlophone, EMI Music (PMCO 7529); Format: Vinyl	—
The Hoax Is Over	Released: January 1971; Label: Infinity (SINL-934092); Format: Vinyl	8
More Arse Than Class	Released: 1974; Label: Atlantic (SD-1017); Format: Vinyl	14
Pick Me Up and Play Me Loud	Released: 1976; Label: Infinity (L-35,964); Format: Vinyl	—

=== Live albums ===
List of live albums, with selected chart positions and certifications
Title	Album details	Peak chart positions	Certification
Title	Album details	AUS	Certification
Live	Released: 1971; Label: Havoc (HST-4001); Format: Vinyl	8	
Aztecs Live at Sunbury	Released: August 1972; Label: Havoc (HST-4003/04); Format: 2xVinyl	4	AUS: 4× Gold
Steaming At The Opera House	Released: December 1974; Label: Atlantic (600 010); Format: 2×LP	71	
Long Live Rock and Roll (Long May It Move Me So)	Released: December 2008; Label: Aztec Music (AVSCD042); Format: CD	—	

=== Compilation albums ===
List of compilations, with selected chart positions and certifications
Title	Album details	Peak chart positions
Title	Album details	AUS
The Best of Billy Thorpe and the Aztecs	Released: 1965; Label: Parlophone (PMCO 7528); Format: LP	—
Great Hits	Released: 1972; Label: Calendar (SR66 9956); Format: LP	—
Gold	Released: May 1975; Label: Atlantic (600015); Format: LP	89
It's All Happening: 20 Greatest Hits 64–68	Released: 1981; Label: Albert Productions / EMI Music; Format: LP	—
Lock Up Your Mothers	Released: May 1994; Label: Mushroom; Format: 3xCD	15
The Best and the Rest of Lock Up Your Mothers	Released: 1994; Label: Mushroom; Format: CD, Cassette	79
The Classic Rock Collection	Released: 1996; Label: Broad Music (BRCD 082); Format: CD	—

=== Video albums ===
Title	Album details	Certification
Jailhouse Rock	Released: 2007; Label: Warner Vision Australia	ARIA: Gold
Live – Boggo Road Jail Australia 1993	Released: 2009; Label: Umbrella	

=== Extended plays ===
List of EPs
Title	Album details
Poison Ivy	Released: August 1964; Label: Linda Lee Records (HX-10834)
Sick & Tired	Released: January 1965; Label: Parlophone (GEPO-70018)
On Stage	Released: April 1965; Label: Parlophone (GEPO-70022)
I Told the Brook	Released: 1965; Label: Parlophone (GEPO-70023)
Stand By Me	Released: 1965; Label: Parlophone (GEPO-70025)
Twilight Time	Released: 1965; Label: Parlophone (GEPO-70027)

=== Singles ===
Year	Title	Chart Positions	EP/Album
Year	Title	AUS	EP/Album
1964	"Smoke and Stack"/"Board Boogie"	-	
1964	"Blue Day"/"You Don't Love Me"	51	Poison Ivy
1964	"Poison Ivy"/"Broken Things"	3	Poison Ivy
1964	"Don't Cha Know"/"Mashed Potato"	9	Sick & Tired
1964	"Sick and Tired"/"About Love"	11	Sick & Tired
1964	"That I Love"/"Over the Rainbow"	2	I Told the Brook
1965	"I Told the Brook"/"Funny Face"	1	I Told the Brook
1965	"Twilight Time"/"My Girl Josephine"	2	Twilight Time
1965	"Hallelujah I Love Her So"/"Baby, Hold Me Close"	16	Twilight Time
1965	"Love Letters"/"Dancing in the Street"	3	Don't You Dig This Kind of Beat
1966	"The Word for Today"/"The New Breed"	23	non-album single
1966	"I've Been Wrong Before"/"Wee Bit More of Your Lovin'"	57	non-album single
1967	"Dream Baby"/"You Don't Live Twice"	55	non-album single
1970	"Good Morning Little School Girl"/"Rock Me Baby"	-	Great Hits
1971	"The Dawn Song"/"Time to Live"	41	non-album single
1972	"Most People I Know (Think That I'm Crazy)"/"Regulation Three Puff"	2	non-album single
1972	"Believe It Just Like Me"/"Get to Hell Out of Here"	25	non-album single
1973	"Movie Queen"/"Mame"	32	Gold
1973	"Don't You Know You're Changing?"/"Yes I'm Tired	-	Gold
1974	"Over the Rainbow"/"Let's Have a Party"	20	Gold
1974	"Cigarettes and Whiskey" (Live)/"Back Home in Australia" (Live)	-	Steaming At The Opera House
1975	"It's Almost Summer"	44	
1979	"Wrapped in the Chains of Your Love"	88	

== Awards and nominations ==
=== Go-Set Pop Poll ===
The Go-Set Pop Poll was coordinated by teen-oriented pop music newspaper, Go-Set and was established in February 1966 and conducted an annual poll during 1966 to 1972 of its readers to determine the most popular personalities.

Year	Nominee / work	Award	Result
1971	The Hoax Is Over	Best Album	4th
1972	Aztecs Live at Sunbury	Best Album	1st
1972	"Most People I Know"	Best Single	3rd
1972	Billy Thorpe & the Aztecs	Best Group	2nd

=== King of Pop Awards ===
The King of Pop Awards were voted by the readers of TV Week. The King of Pop award started in 1967 and ran through to 1978.

Year	Nominee / work	Award	Result
1972	Billy Thorpe & The Aztecs	Best Group	Won

== Bibliography ==
- Australian Encyclopedia of Rock & Pop – Noel McGrath – 1978
- An Australian Rock Discography – Chris Spencer −1990 – Moonlight Publishing
- The Who's Who of Australian Rock – Chris Spencer – Moonlight Publishing
- The Encyclopedia of Australian Rock and Pop – Ian McFarlane – Allen & Unwin, Sydney – 1999
