= Aztecs Live at Sunbury =

Aztecs Live! At Sunbury

Live album by Billy Thorpe and the Aztecs
- Released: August 1972
- Recorded: 30 January 1972
- Genre: Blues-rock/heavy metal
- Length: 73:17
- Label: Havoc Catalog No. HSP 4004

Billy Thorpe and the Aztecs chronology
Aztecs Live (1971)	Aztecs Live! At Sunbury (1972)	More Arse Than Class (1974)

Aztecs Live! At Sunbury was a double live album released in August 1972 by Australian hard rock group Billy Thorpe and the Aztecs, which was recorded at the inaugural Sunbury Pop Festival in late January.

Aztecs Live! At Sunbury included eight tracks from their set. The double LP peaked at number 4 on the Australian Kent Music Report Albums Chart in September 1972. In mint condition, the original LP release, with pop-up inserts, is much sought after by collectors. A CD version was released in 2007 by Aztec Music, as Live at Sunbury by Billy Thorpe & the Aztecs.

In October 2010, Aztecs Live! At Sunbury (1972) was listed in the book, 100 Best Australian Albums.

The album is not to be confused with their previous album, entitled Aztecs Live, which was first released in 1971 and peaked at number 8 in the Australian album chart in April 1972.

== Track listing ==
1972 version.

- "C C Rider" (7:08)
- "Be-Bop-a-Lula" (5:23)
- "Momma" (11:33)
- "Rock Me Baby" (9:46)
- "Most People I Know Think That I'm Crazy" (7:27)
- "Time to Live" (6:33)
- "Jump Back" (10:03)
- "Ooh Poo Pah Doo" (15:17)

== Charts ==
=== Weekly charts ===
Chart (1972)	Peak position
Australia (Kent Music Report)	4

=== Year-end charts ===
Chart (1972)	Peak position
Australia (Kent Music Report)	21

== Certifications ==
Region	Certification	Certified units/sales
Australia (ARIA)	4× Gold	80,000^{^}
^{^} Shipments figures based on certification alone.
