= East of Eden's Gate =

Studio album by Billy Thorpe
- Released: 1982
- Genre: Progressive rock
- Length: 42:18
- Label: Pasha
- Producer: Spencer Proffer, Billy Thorpe

Billy Thorpe chronology
Stimulation (1981)	East of Eden's Gate (1982)	Children of the Sun...Revisited (1987)

East of Eden's Gate is a studio album by singer Billy Thorpe. It was released in 1982 by Pasha Records. The singles were "Hold On to Your Dream" and "No Show Tonight". The album was remastered in 2013 by Rock Candy Records.

== Reception ==
Kerrang! said the album "holds a tremendously atmospheric feel within its grooves. The power and constraint is claustrophobic but makes you enjoy that intensity without feeling trapped" and "contains plenty to raise rectums from reclining".

== Track listing ==
No.	Title	Length
1.	"East of Eden's Gate"
2.	"Edge of Madness"
3.	"Hold On to Your Dream"
4.	"While You're Still Young"
5.	"No Show Tonight"
6.	"I Can't Stand It"
7.	"Nite Rites"
8.	"Cruisin' (The Town in the Heat of the Night)"
9.	"Dogs of War (Flesh and Blood)"
