= Million Dollar Bill (album) =

Studio album by Billy Thorpe
- Released: 1975
- Recorded: 10 October – 5 November 1975
- Studio: Festival, Studio 24, Sydney, Australia
- Genre: Rock, funk, soul
- Length: 36:51
- Label: Festival, Infinity
- Producer: Peter Dawkins

Billy Thorpe chronology
Million Dollar Bill (1975)	Pick Me Up and Play Me Loud (1976)

Singles from Million Dollar Bill
- 1. "It's Almost Summer" Released: 1975; 2. "Drive My Car" Released: 1975; 3. "Do the Best You Can" Released: 1976; 4. "Mama Told Her" Released: 1976

Million Dollar Bill is the debut solo album by Australian musician Billy Thorpe, released in 1975. Four singles were released in support of the album: "It's Almost Summer", "Drive My Car", "Do the Best You Can" and "Mama Told Her". The album peaked at number 37 on the Kent Music Report in Australia.

== Track listing ==
All tracks are written by Billy Thorpe, except as noted.

No.	Title	Writer(s)	Length
1.	"Back on the Streets Again"	Gabriel Mekler, Trevor Lawrence	4:54
2.	"Drive My Car"	John Lennon, Paul McCartney	3:28
3.	"I Really Miss You"	Billy Thorpe	4:20
4.	"It's Almost Summer"	Billy Thorpe	3:01
5.	"Do The Best You Can"	Billy Kristian	4:25
6.	"Theme From Million Dollar Bill"	Billy Thorpe	4:55
7.	"Mama Told Her"	Catherine C. Williamson, Gabriel Mekler, Trevor Lawrence	3:21
8.	"Standin' Too Close to the Fire"	Billy Thorpe	6:06
9.	"Don't Need No Protection"	Chris Jagger	3:41
Total length:			36:51

== Personnel ==
- Bass – Billy Kristian
- Bongos – Peter Dawkins (tracks: 1)
- Cello – David Pereira, Frederick McKay, Hans Gyors, Lal Kuring, Robert W. Miller, Vanessa Butters
- Congas – J.C. Trevisano (tracks: 1, 5, 8)
- Drums, percussion – Gill Mathews
- Electric piano [Fender Rhodes] – Jack Hotop
- Guitar – John Fetter (tracks: 1, 2, 5, 8)
- Guitar, vocals – Billy Thorpe
- Keyboards – Warren Morgan
- Saxophone – Don Wright, Tony Buchanan
- Synthesizer – William Motzing
- Trombone – Arthur Hubbard, Bob McIvor, George Brodbeck, Ken Herron
- Trumpet – Boot Thompsen, Ed D'Amico, Keith Dubber, Mike Bukousky, Mike Cleary
- Violin – Alice Waten, Della Woods, Frank Coe, Gordon Bennett, John Lyle, Julie Batty, Klara Korda, Phillip Hart, Robert Ingram
- Vocals – Allison McAllum, Janice Slater, Kerrie Biddell

Production

- Arranged by [Brass, Strings, Vocal] – William Motzing
- Engineer – Gerry Stevens
- Mastered by Jo Hansch
- Produced by Peter Dawkins
