= Painters and Dockers =

Australian rock band

- Origin: Melbourne, Victoria, Australia
- Genres: Rock, pub rock
- Years active: 1982–1998, 2014–present
- Labels: Au Go Go; Big Time; Dock; White Label; Musicland; Shock
- Spinoffs: Dili Allstars
- Past members: see Members list below

Painters and Dockers are an Australian rock band formed in Melbourne in 1982.

Paul Stewart, backing singer-songwriter and trumpet player, Dave Pace (vocals and trumpet) and Mick Morris (vocals and sax) are all original members in the band which was named for the Federated Ship Painters and Dockers Union when they performed an early gig at a pub rock venue in Port Melbourne frequented by the union's members. Some members of the band went on to form the Dili Allstars.

Their best-performing album, Kiss My Art, peaked in the top 30 of the Australian Recording Industry Association (ARIA) albums charts in 1988. The album included two top 50 singles, "Nude School" and "Die Yuppie Die".

In 2009, the band was inducted into the Music Victoria Hall of Fame.

== History ==
=== 1982−1987: Beginnings, Love Planet and Bucket ===
Painters and Dockers formed in Melbourne, Australia in 1982 with five members, Vladimir Juric on guitars and backing vocals, Andy Marron on drums, Phil Nelson on bass guitar, Chris O'Connor on guitars and lead vocals, and mainstay Paul Stewart on backing vocals and trumpet. One of the earliest gigs for the unnamed group was at a pub rock venue in Port Melbourne frequented by members of the Federated Ship Painters and Dockers Union so they chose Painters and Dockers for the event and retained the name thereafter. In their earlier years, they were the headline act at the Port Melbourne Community Festival, and in a government initiative called Rockin' the Rails, where they played songs from the back of a train, as it stopped at various Melbourne stations, including Ringwood, Camberwell and Flinders Street.

Painters and Dockers' first recording, "Mohawk Baby", was released on independent label, Au Go Go records' compilation album, Asleep at the Wheel early in 1984. Soon after, Marron was replaced by Colin Buckler on drums, and they released their debut album, Love Planet, which was produced by veteran hard rocker, Lobby Loyde and released on Big Time Records in 1984 and contained the tracks, "Basia!", also released as a single in March 1985, and "The Boy Who Lost His Jocks on Flinders Street Station". Joining after the album's release were Mick Morris on tenor saxophone and Dave Pace on trumpet / backing vocals, and with Stewart the horn section was called the Brassholes. Music historian, Ian McFarlane, describes their sound as "adding an earthy R&B edge to the band's raucous, punk-infused power pop".

A four-track EP, Kill Kill Kill was released in 1985 containing cover versions of "Kill Kill Kill" originally by The Sacred Cows on "The Groovy Guru" episode of US comedy TV series, Get Smart; Australian group Supernaut's "I Like it Both Ways"; The Ramones' "Do You Remember Rock'n'Roll Radio?" and The Saints' "Know Your Product". Their first single, "Basia!", released in March 1985 on Big Time Records, was a paean to Basia Bonkowski—lyrics include "B she's so beautiful, A articulate too, S sensual, I international, Ay Ay" and "She's sitting there with her multi-coloured hair / She's sitting there with that multi-cultured stare"—who was presenter of SBS' music television show, Rock Around the World from 1982 to late 1984.

A live album, Bucket, released in October 1986 on the band's own label Dock Records (distributed by Shock Records) and Big Time Records, featured one of their live pub rock performances.

=== 1988–1997: Kiss My Art, Touch One, Touch All and The Things that Matter ===
The band's second studio album, Kiss My Art, was released in August 1988 on White Label Records (a subsidiary of Mushroom Records) and peaked at No. 23 on the Australian Recording Industry Association (ARIA) albums charts in September 1988. The album spawned four singles, "Nude School", "Die Yuppie Die", "Love on Your Breath" and "Safe Sex", and the first two achieved top 50 chart success. and were accompanied with video clips directed by ex Hunters & Collectors Geoff Crosby. The album was again produced by Lobby Loyde, except for "Nude School" which was produced by Francois Taviaux aka Franswah.

Their third studio album, a live-in-the-studio recording entitled Touch One, Touch All, was released on 20 November 1989, spawning the related singles, "Dirty Filthy Rock'n'Roll" in November, and "Eat Shit Die" in May 1990. Neither album nor singles peaked into the top 50. Morris left in 1989 and Darren Garth had replaced Juric on guitar by early 1990; the band undertook a Canadian tour promoting the album.

On 18 November 1991 they released the mini-album, Hickory Dickory Dock with its track "Merry Christmas, Carol" and the single, "New World Order". Nervous '90s appeared in June 1992 and contained six studio tracks, one a re-recording of "You Know You're Soaking in It" from Touch One Touch All, and three bonus live tracks recorded with the Salvation Army Brass Band. During 1992 they became involved in Performers Releasing Information about Clean Syringes (PRICS), which included running workshops and gigs on safe sex and drug use. In 1993, Garth left and Colin Badger joined on guitar and backing vocals, Painters and Dockers undertook the Australia-wide Return to the Love Planet tour and released a pro gay single, "I Know Better Queens than That". In 1994, "I Know Better Queens than That" appeared on the band's fourth and last (to date) full-length album, The Things That Matter.

=== 1998–present: The Things that Matter ===
A mini-album, Advance Australia Where?, was released in August 1998 with the single "You're Going Home in the Back of a Divi Van". By that stage, original members, Nelson and O'Connor had left, mainstay Stewart now with Badger and Buckler were joined by Paul Calvert on bass guitar, Sonja Parkinson on trombone and backing vocals, and Jenny Pineapple on saxophone and backing vocals. This line-up appeared at Mushroom 25 Live concert in November to celebrate the record label's anniversary, their track "Divi Van" appeared on the related VHS release, Mushroom 25 Live: The Concert of the Century.

In 2009 Stewart featured on the ABC Compass religious program following a liver transplant with the episode featuring Painters And Dockers songs Nude School and Die Yuppie Die. Stewart is actively involved in fundraising for the Alma Nuns, a Timorese-based Catholic order who care for disabled children and orphans.

On 20 November 2009, early members, Paul Stewart, Chris O'Connor, Colin Buckler, Vladimir Juric, David Pace and Mick Morris, with Michael Badger (not an original member) reformed for a one-off show at the Prince Bandroom in St Kilda, Melbourne, where the band was inducted into Music Victoria's Hall of Fame.

In 2017, Painters and Dockers undertook their 30th Anniversary, Kiss My Art tour.

== Members ==
=== Current members ===
The band's official website lists eight current members.

- Paulie Stewart – lead vocals
- Colin Badger – guitar
- Michael Badger-Taweel – guitar
- Richard Bradbeer – bass guitar
- Dahl Murphy – drums
- David Pace – trumpet, backing vocals
- Mick Morris – tenor saxophone
- Sonja Parkinson – trombone, backing vocals

=== Former members ===
The band's former members include:

- Vladimir Juric – guitar, backing vocals (1982–1989)
- Chris O'Connor – guitar, backing vocals (1982–1998)
- Darren Garth – guitar, backing vocals (c. 1990–1993)
- Phil Nelson – bass guitar (1982–1998)
- Paul Calvert – bass guitar (1998)
- Andy Marron – drums (1982–1984)
- Colin Buckler – drums (1984–1998)
- Jenny Pineapple – saxophone, backing vocals (1998)

Dali Platt was identified as the band's bass player during its 2023 recording activity.

=== Timeline ===
Membership dates are given to the year because exact joining and departure dates are not available for several line-up changes. Reunion-era dates begin with the earliest year confirmed by the cited sources. Although Bradbeer is listed on the band's official roster, Platt was also identified as the band's bass player during its 2023 recording activity.

== Discography ==
=== Studio albums ===
List of albums, with selected details and chart positions
Title	Album details	Peak chart positions
Title	Album details	AUS
Love Planet	Released: 1984; Label: Big Time (BT 7046); Format: LP, Cassette, CD	—
Kiss My Art	Released: August 1988; Label: Mushroom (MUSH32274.2); Format: LP, Cassette, CD	23
Touch One, Touch All	Released: December 1989; Label: Musicland (MUS LP2011); Format: LP, cassette, CD	—
The Things That Matter	Released: 1994; Label: Dock (DOCKCD6000); Format: Cassette, CD	—

=== Live albums ===
Title	Album details
Bucket	Released: 1986; Label: DOC Records (DOC R002); Format: LP, cassette, CD; Note: Live recording from Melbourne in March and April 1986
Overt and Deliberate	Released: 2009; Label: Painters and Dockers; Format: Limited edition (500 copies) CD; Note: Live at the Gluepot Auckland, 1988
You Know You Want To (Live)	Released: August 2020; Label: Painters and Dockers; Format: LP, download, streaming; Note: Recorded live February, 2020. Mixed by Michael Badger.

=== Extended plays ===
Title	EP details
Kill Kill Kill	Released: 1985; Label: Big Time (BTB-910); Format: LP
Hickory, Dickory, Dock	Released: 1991; Format: CD, Cassette; Label: Painters and Dockers (CD2000)
Nervous '90s	Released: 30 June 1992; Label: Painters and Dockers (CD3000); Format: CD, cassette
Advance Australia Where?	Released: 31 August 1998; Label: Painters and Dockers (DOC10000); Format: CD

=== Singles ===
List of singles, with selected chart positions
Title	Year	Peak chart positions	
Title	Year	AUS	NZ
"Basia!"	1985	—	—
"Bend Me Shape Me"	1985	—	—
"Nude School"	1987	29	—
"Die Yuppie Die"	1987	49	44
"Love on Your Breath"	1988	—	—
"Safe Sex"	1988	—	—
"Dirty Filthy Rock 'n' Roll"	1989	—	—
"Eat Shit Die"	1990	—	—
"New World Order"	1991	—	—
"I Know Better Queens Than That"	1993	—	—
"Let's Give It a Go with the Flybz"	2012	—	—
"Holiday On Ice"	2018	—	—

== Awards and nominations ==
=== ARIA Music Awards ===
The ARIA Music Awards is an annual awards ceremony that recognises excellence, innovation, and achievement across all genres of Australian music. They commenced in 1987.

Year	Nominee / work	Award	Result	Ref.
1988	Painters and Dockers	Best New Talent	Nominated	

=== The Age EG Awards ===
The Age EG Awards are an annual awards night celebrating Victorian music. They commenced in 2005.

Year	Nominee / work	Award	Result
2009	Painters and Dockers	Hall Of Fame	Inductee
