= X (Australian band) =

Australian punk rock band

- Origin: Sydney, New South Wales, Australia
- Genres: Punk rock
- Years active: 1977–present
- Spinoffs: Sardine v
- Spinoff of: Rose Tattoo
- Members: Steve Lucas; Kim Volkman; Doug Falconer
- Past members: Ian Rilen; Steve Cafiero; Peter Coutanche; Ian Krahe; Geoff Holmes; Cath Synnerdahl; Cathy Green

X is an Australian punk rock band, formed in Sydney, New South Wales in 1977 founded by Ian Rilen, Steve Lucas, Ian Krahe and Steve Cafiero. The group was formed simultaneously with, and with no knowledge of, the Los Angeles group of the same name.

== History ==
=== Early years ===
Ian Rilen had been a founder member of the hard rock group Rose Tattoo; on leaving that band he formed X with Steve Lucas as vocalist, Ian Krahe on guitar and Steve Cafiero on drums in 1977. Krahe was renowned for playing so frenetically without a pick that his hands would bleed. Krahe died of an overdose on 20 May 1978, shortly before the group recorded its first album, X-Aspirations. Recorded in five hours at Trafalgar Studios in Sydney, the album has been listed in the book 100 Best Australian Albums. X-Aspirations, like all X studio albums, was produced by Lobby Loyde, who was also in Rose Tattoo (albeit after Rilen left: in 1979–1980). X split up shortly after the album's 1980 release.

=== Reformation ===
During X's first break from 1980 to 1983, Ian Rilen and his wife Stephanie Rilen founded the post-punk band Sardine v. Early in the 1980s, manager Nick Chance and booking agent Gerard Schlaghecke got X back together for a tour. When informed of the tour dates, Cafiero kept his promise and refused to travel to Melbourne, citing his obligations to his family and his real estate job. On short notice, Canberra-based drummer Cathy Green took Cafiero's place for the Melbourne tour. Cafiero died in December 1988 after suffering an allergic reaction to dye injected before an X-ray for a back problem, at which time Green joined X permanently.

The band's second album, At Home With You (1985) was recorded in Melbourne at Richmond Recorders in March 1985. It was produced by Lobby Loyde and engineered by Tony Cohen. The recording was a signing with Major Records, run by Max Robenstone. The album stayed in Australia's top 20 Independent charts for 29 months. A third album, X And More (1989), followed and, like the previous albums, was produced by Loyde. Although the group has not issued a studio recording since X And More, live albums from the late 1970s as well as one from 2002 have been issued between 1997 and 2004. The 2002 Evil Rumours Live At The Basement 9 December 2002 features a line-up including Geoff Holmes and Cath Synnerdahl. A compilation of early unreleased material, X-Citations Best Of X And Rarities Vol 1 (The Early Years 1977 - 1983) was issued in 2017. Cath Synnerdahl died by suicide on 16 July 2004. Lucas, the only remaining member of the original line-up, continues to periodically played live under the X name, currently with bassist Kim Volkman and Hunters & Collectors drummer Doug Falconer.

=== Post-X ===
Green (on bass) and Rilen (on bass and guitar) were both members of Hell to Pay, which released the album Steal It in 1992. Until his death in 2006, Rilen had settled on a fairly stable line-up of Ian Rilen & the Love Addicts, with Green playing bass. The band issued a CD, Passion Boots & Bruises. Lucas utilised Melbourne's White Cross as a backing band to record two albums: Double Cross and Bought And Sold. Lucas also fronted Bigger Than Jesus, founded the Groody Frenzy, A.R.M. (with Chris Welsh and Mike Couvret), The Pubert Brown Fridge Occurrence, Neon and Venom and the Heinous Hounds (with Dave Hogan, Jerome Smith, Matt Dwyer and Peter Robertson). In 2004, Lucas released the solo album Bread and Water featuring cameos from Paul Kelly, Brett Kingman, Andrew Pendlebury and Chris Wilson. Green also played on albums by Loene Carmen's group Automatic Cherry and Carmen's solo release Slight Delay. Steve Lucas' most recent release is Cross That Line 2022. All original songs feature; Pete Mavric on double bass, Bruce Haymes - piano, Peter Robertson- brushes and, Dave Hogan - harmonica. Also featuring horn section (from The Horns of Leroy) Chris Vizard - trombone, Travis Woods - trumpet, Jon Hunt sax. Special cameo Joey Bedlam (Steve Lucas' wife) duet. Limited edition vinyl on the SLXpress label and on CD through AZTEC MUSIC.

== Discography ==
=== Singles and EPs ===
- 1979: "I Don't Wanna Go Out"/"Waiting" 7" (X Music)
- 1984: "Mother"/"Half Way Round The World" 7" (X Music)
- 1985: "El Salvador" one-sided 7" flexi (Phantom Records)
- 1987: "Dream Baby"/"I Don't Want To Go Out"; "Without You" 7"/12" (White Label)
- 1989: "And More"/"Getting Wet" 7" (White Label)
- 2001: I Love Rock'n'Roll CDEP (Laughing Outlaw)

=== Studio albums ===
- 1979: X-Aspirations (X Music YPRX1645, re-released Aztec Music 2009)
- 1985: At Home with You (Major MRLP002, re-released [Morphius Archives, 2002]
- 1988: And More (White Label)
- 2011: X -Spurts (Aztec Music)

=== Live albums ===
- 1997: X Live 8 July 1978 (Spiral Scratch)
- 2001: Live at the Civic 1979 (Dropkick)
- 2003: Evil Rumours (Laughing Outlaw)
