= Children of the Sun (Billy Thorpe album) =

Studio album by Billy Thorpe
- Released: 1979
- Recorded: Pasha Music House, Hollywood, California
- Genre: Rock, funk, pop, soul
- Length: 37:53
- Label: Polydor Records, Capricorn Records, CBS Records
- Producer: Spencer Proffer

Billy Thorpe chronology
Pick Me Up and Play Me Loud (1976)	Children of the Sun (1979)	21st Century Man (1980)

Singles from Children of the Sun
- 1. "Wrapped in the Chains of Your Love" Released: July 1979; 2. "Goddess of the Night" Released: July 1979; 3. "Children of the Sun" Released: September 1979; 4. "Simple Life" Released: September 1979

Children Of The Sun...Revisited
- 1987 Re-issued Cover

Children of the Sun is the third studio album by Australian musician Billy Thorpe, released in 1979. The album spawned the singles "Wrapped in the Chains of Your Love", "Goddess of the Night", "Children of the Sun" and "Simple Life". The album peaked at number 44 on the Kent Music Report.

The album was Thorpe's debut album in the United States of America.

In 1987, the album was partially reissued as Children of the Sun...Revisited, featuring 5 songs from the original album, plus 3 newly recorded tracks for the compilation, with "East of Eden's Gate" as the closing track.

== Reception ==
Cash Box magazine called the album "an ambitious rock project" saying "Side one is a fairly mainstream set of guitar rock numbers, but side two is an imaginative, fantasy-like concept work which depicts the massive transporting of human life on Earth to a new destiny in outer space."

== Track listings ==
No.	Title	Writer(s)	Length
1.	"Wrapped in the Chains of Your Love"	Billy Thorpe	3:38
2.	"Dream Maker"	Billy Thorpe	3:43
3.	"Simple Life"	Billy Thorpe	5:39
4.	"Goddess of the Night"	Billy Thorpe, Spencer Proffer	4:21
5.	"Children Of The Sun"	Billy Thorpe, Spencer Proffer	6:44
6.	"We're Leaving"	Billy Thorpe	3:50
7.	"We Welcome You"	Billy Thorpe	4:42
8.	"Solar Anthem"	Billy Thorpe	0:55
9.	"The Beginning"	Billy Thorpe	4:15
Total length:			37:53

=== 1987 partial re-issue Children of the Sun... Revisited ===
1. Children Of The Sun (Billy Thorpe, Spencer Proffer) - 6:44
2. We're Leaving (Billy Thorpe) - 3:50
3. We Welcome You (Billy Thorpe) - 4:43
4. Solar Anthem (Billy Thorpe) - 0:56
5. The Beginning (Billy Thorpe) - 4:14
6. Earth Calling* (Billy Thorpe) - 5:26
7. Turn It Into Love* (Billy Thorpe) - 5:08
8. Free Enterprise* (Billy Thorpe) - 3:47
9. East of Eden's Gate+ (Bill Cuomo, Billy Thorpe, Earl Slick, Jim Johnson, Roderick Falconer, Spencer Proffer) - 6:20

Credits;

- Tracks 1–5 taken from the 1979 album Children of the Sun
- Tracks 6–8 new recordings for this compilation
- Track 9 taken from the 1982 album East of Eden's Gate

== Personnel ==
- Bass: Leland Sklar
- Drums: Alvin Taylor
- Guitar, vocals: Billy Thorpe

Production

- Art direction: Jim Welch
- Co-producer: Billy Thorpe
- Cover, artwork: Mouse & Kelley
- Design [stylist]: Randee St. Nicholas
- Engineer: Larry Brown
- Mastering: Bernie Grundman
- Vinyl mastering: Bill Kiper
- Photography: Bob Jenkins
- Producer: Spencer Proffer

== Charts ==
Chart (1979)	Peak position
Australia (Kent Music Report)	44

Chart (1979)	Peak position
United States (Billboard Charts)	39

== In popular culture ==
The title track was used in episodes of the second season of the Fargo television series.
