= Keith Barber (drummer) =

English-Australian rock musician (1947–2005)

Keith Gordon Barber (17 April 1947 – 31 May 2005) was an English-Australian rock musician. He was born in Kilburn, London, England. Barber moved to Melbourne in December 1957, when he was 10 years old, with his parents Gladys Cathrine Barber(1922–2016) and Frederick Gordon Barber (1922–1982) and three siblings.

He joined a local band, the Wild Cherries, on drums in early 1966. With founding member Les Gilbert, he put together a second incarnation of the group, which recorded four singles for the Festival label between 1967 and 1968. In late 1968, he left to join a New Zealand band, the La De Da's, and toured England, where the band recorded a cover of the Beatles' "Come Together". He remained with the band until they broke up in 1975. The musician retired from the music industry and became a printer. Keith Gordon Barber died on 31 May 2005, six months after being diagnosed with cancer. His wife, Beate, survived him.
