= Kiss My Art =

Studio album by Painters and Dockers
- Released: August 1988
- Recorded: 1987
- Studio: Richmond Studios, Melbourne, Victoria
- Genre: Rock
- Label: White Label Records; Mushroom Records
- Producer: Lobby Loyde, Francois Taviaux aka Franswah

Painters and Dockers chronology
Bucket (1986)	Kiss My Art (1988)	Touch One, Touch All (1989)

Singles from Kiss My Art
- 1. "Nude School" Released: June 1987; 2. "Die Yuppie Die" Released: September 1987; 3. "Love on Your Breath" Released: April 1988; 4. "Safe Sex" Released: October 1988

Kiss My Art is the second studio album released by Australian rock band, Painters and Dockers, which peaked in the top 30 of the Australian Recording Industry Association (ARIA) albums charts in September 1988. The album spawned four singles, "Nude School", "Die Yuppie Die", "Love on Your Breath" and "Safe Sex", and the first two achieved top 50 chart success. The album was produced by hard rocker Lobby Loyde, except for "Nude School" which was produced by Francois Taviaux aka Franswah.

== Background ==
Painters and Dockers formed in 1982 with Vladimir Juric (guitars, backing vocals), Andy Marron (drums), Phil Nelson (bass guitar), Chris O'Connor (guitars, backing vocals) and Paul Stewart (vocals, trumpet). Their name was chosen when they played at a pub frequented by Federated Ship Painters and Dockers Union members, with no other name they adopted Painters and Dockers for the gig and kept it.

By 1984, Marron had left and new members were Colin Buckler (drums), Mick Morris (saxophone) and Dave Pace (trumpet, backing vocals). "Nude School" was released in June 1987 and peaked in the top 30 of the Australian Recording Industry Association (ARIA) singles charts and was followed by "Die Yuppie Die" which reached the top 50 in September.

Their third studio album, Kiss My Art, was released in August 1988 on Mushroom Records' imprint White Label Records, which peaked in the top 30 of the ARIA albums charts in September. The album was produced by hard rocker Lobby Loyde, except for the earlier track, "Nude School" which was produced by Francois Taviaux aka Franswah. Two further singles, "Love on Your Breath" and "Safe Sex", from the album were released but did not reach the top 50.

== Track listing ==
All tracks are written by Painters and Dockers members as noted

Kiss My Art
No.	Title	Length
1.	"Jack's Car" (Chris O'Connor, Vladimir Juric)	5:33
2.	"Die Yuppie Die" (Vladimir Juric, Chris O'Connor, Mick Morris, Paul Stewart)	2:59
3.	"Safe Sex" (Chris O'Connor)	4:18
4.	"Bad" (Paul Stewart, Vladimir Juric)	3:10
5.	"If He Beats You, Leave!" (Chris O'Connor)	3:58
6.	"Love on Your Breath" (Chris O'Connor, Colin Buckler, Mick Morris, David Pace, Vladimir Juric)	3:20
7.	"Timing" (Chris O'Connor)	3:58
8.	"I'm Selling Out" (Chris O'Connor, Paul Stewart)	2:37
9.	"Meltdown" (Vladimir Juric, Phil Nelson, Paul Stewart)	3:52
10.	"Nude School (Note: "Nude School" was produced by Franswah, all other tracks were produced by Lobby Loyde.)" (Chris O'Connor, Vladimir Juric)	3:37
11.	"Judas (Little Ms Iscariot I Presume)" (Paul Stewart, Vladimir Juric)	4:28

== Personnel ==
=== Musicians ===
- Colin Buckler – drums
- Vladimir Juric – guitar, vocals
- Mick Morris – saxophone
- Phil Nelson – bass guitar
- Chris O'Connor – guitar, vocals
- David Pace – trumpet, vocals
- Paul Stewart – trumpet, vocals

=== Production ===
- Engineer – Chris Thompson
  - Assistant engineer – Graham Duncan
- Mix engineer and post-production – Clive Martin
  - Assistant mix engineer – Andrew Scott, Niven Garland, Stuart Day
- Producer – Lobby Loyde, except "Nude School" – Francois Taviaux aka Franswah

== Charts ==
Chart performance for Kiss My Art
Chart (1988)	Peak position
Australian Albums (ARIA)	23
