= Tony Barber (musician) =

Australian musician

- Born: Anthony Arthur Barber; 3 December 1942 (age 83); England, United Kingdom
- Other name: A.A Barber (publishing pen name)
- Occupations: Author; singer-songwriter; inventor; artist; soft toy designer

Anthony Arthur Barber, known as Tony Barber (born 3 December 1942) is an English-born author, singer-songwriter, inventor, artist, papercrafter and soft toy designer who emigrated to Australia in 1963.

== Biography ==
He was a member of the band Billy Thorpe & the Aztecs in the 1960s. Subsequently, performing as a solo artist, his biggest hit was "Someday" (Aust #13/1966). He wrote 35 children's books in the 1980s under the names A. A. Barber and Tony Barber, including The Puggle Tales. He appeared on the children's television show The Music Shop as Tony the Toymaker. Many of his books feature a fantasy character he created and named "Puggle", for which he also designed a stuffed toy of the same name that gained popularity and that was then used to name a baby echidna.

Barber founded The Lost Forests chain of toy stores, which sold soft toys that he designed.
