= At Home with You =

Studio album by Australian band X
- Released: 1985
- Recorded: March 1985
- Studio: Richmond Recorders
- Genre: Rock, punk
- Label: Major (1985 release); Aztec Music (2007 reissue)
- Producer: Lobby Loyde

Australian band X chronology
X-Aspirations (1979)	At Home with You (1985)	And More (1989)

At Home with You is the second studio album from Australian rock band X. It was produced by Lobby Loyde; whereas the band's first album was reputedly recorded in five hours, the second was completed in five days.

== Details ==
Between this and its first album X-Aspirations the group had broken up; mainstays Steve Lucas and Ian Rilen had played with Harold Holt and the Sharks and The Feel, and Sardine v respectively. Lucas and Rilen and Steve Cafiero regrouped as X in late 1984.

X was managed by Sydney-based manager Nick Chance of Chance Management between 1984 and 1986 after he was approached by Ian Rilen to do so, and agreed. Steve Cafiero played his last show with X at the North Sydney Leagues Club on 2 December 1984.

X was on a tour and heading to Melbourne, 2 days after the last show it transpired for Cafiero when he broke the news.

The Melbourne shows were at The Club 5 Dec; La Trobe Uni. 6 Dec; Prince of Wales Hotel 7 Dec; and Eureka Hotel 8 Dec. Cathy was recommended by booking agent Gerard Schlaghecke at Premier Artists in Melbourne, after a call from Nick on 3 Dec advising Cafiero had left the band, and asking Gerard if he knew a Melbourne-based replacement. He recommended Cathy, knowing her to be fan of X and that she knew the songs. Cathy agreed to do the shows on 2 days notice and a rehearsal studio was booked for the evening of 4 Dec in Melbourne on arrival of Ian, Steve and Nick. Ian's bass was so loud at that first rehearsal, Nick recalls sitting in the rental car below and hearing nothing but the bass with the reverberations felt in the car. X were rehearsing in a three-story double brick building on the third floor.

During the 2nd rehearsal Nick organised by requesting an extended soundcheck at The Club 5 Dec, Cathy began playing the drum pattern for 'You Say That You Love Me'. Ian joined in with a bass line tune, and Steve added guitar. The song was written in about 10 mins. It was to go on the At Home With You album when it was recorded in March 1985. During that moment Steve and Ian, with Nick watching, all realised X had found a new drummer that was as good, if not better than Steve Cafiero.

Cathy played all the shows flawlessly and impressed everyone with her drumming style and ability. It was one of the things that made At Home With You the album it was. It would have been quite a different album, possibly not as good, if Cathy hadn't joined the band. She breathed new life into the band, and at the time when they needed it, still getting over the shock of Steve Cafieros's sudden departure after so many years as an original lineup member.

The song 'You Say That You Love Me' made the album in March 1985 when it was recorded, and it would never have been written at all if Cathy had not agreed to join the band on 2 days notice. Cathy had previously been a member of the Canberra band **** **** (pronounced 'Cough Cough'). Green had first seen X 'a couple of years earlier' at the invitation of Mark Seymour, of Hunters and Collectors; three tracks on At Home With You which utilised the 'Horns of Contempt' (John Howard, Jeremy Smith and Michael Waters), the brass section from Hunters & Collectors. The latter also covered Ian and Stephanie Rilen's song 'Stuck on You', which originally recorded by Sardine V. It was on the 'Hunters & Collectors' 1986 album Human Frailty.

The 'X - At Home With You' album was recorded by and on the Major Music label run by Max Robenstone. He also has a relative that ran restaurant that provided excellent food to the studio which was Richmond Recorders, all paid for by Major Records.

== Reception ==
Ian McFarlane has written that At Home with You 'displayed a breadth and sense of dynamics only previously hinted at in the band's music. A lot had to do with the freshness and vitality, to say nothing of the rhythmic swing, that Green contributed to the band.' Richard Guilliatt, writing in the Age in November 1985, claimed the LP 'vindicates the band's persistence, a fantastic slice of the most basic, earthy rock...' The sleeve notes to the 2009 reissue, quoting an interview with Green from December, 1985, claim that the photograph on the album cover is of the band reacting with hilarity to The Cosby Show.

== Original LP track listing ==
1. "The Feel"
2. "T.V. Glue"
3. "Movin' On"
4. "Halfway 'Round the World"
5. "You Say That You Love Me"
6. "Degenerate Boy"
7. "All Over Now"
8. "At Home with You"
9. "Goin' Crazy"
10. "Oxford Street Nick"
11. "Don't Cry No Tears"
12. "She's Gone"

A special limited edition was released called "A TV Dinner at Home with X". It contained a T-shirt and a flexi-disc of the song "El Salvador" recorded live at The Prince of Wales in Melbourne, Australia on 13 March 1985 for a live 3PBS radio broadcast. In searching for the master tapes for this track for the 2007 reissue, the complete concert was found and issued as a bonus disc.

== 2007 reissue track listing ==
=== Disc one ===
1. "The Feel"
2. "T.V. Glue"
3. "Movin' On"
4. "Halfway 'Round the World"
5. "You Say That You Love Me"
6. "Degenerate Boy"
7. "All Over Now"
8. "At Home with You"
9. "Goin' Crazy"
10. "Oxford Street Nick"
11. "Don't Cry No Tears"
12. "She's Gone"
13. "El Salvador" (live 13 March 1985) [bonus track]

=== Disc two ===
Live at the Prince of Wales Melbourne. 13 March 1985.

1. "The Feel"
2. "Degenerate Boy"
3. "Simulated Lovers"
4. "Delinquent Cars"
5. "Good on Ya Baby"
6. "Goin' Crazy"
7. "Oxford Street Nick"
8. "She's Gone"
9. "Waiting"
10. "Dipstick"
11. "Suck Suck"
12. "Halfway 'Round the World"
13. "All Over Now"
14. "T.V. Glue"
15. "I Don't Wanna Go Out"

== Personnel ==
=== Musicians ===
- Steve Lucas – guitar, vocals
- Ian Rilen – bass
- Cathy Green – drums
- The Horns of Contempt – horn section

=== Management ===
- Nick Chance – Chance Management
- Current website: Chance MUSIC

=== Record Label ===
- Max Robenstone – Major Records

=== Production ===
- Recorded at – Richmond Recorders
- Lobby Lloyd – Producer
- Tony Cohen – Engineer
- Peter Byron – Cover art
- Ruby Davies – Cover photography

=== Album Credits Special Thanks ===
- Nick Chance
- Max Robenstone
- Richmond Recorders

=== Technical ===
- Lobby Loyde – producer
