= The Puggle Tales =

Grandma Puggles Missing Silver Egg Timer

The Puggle Tales are a group of seven books written by A. A. Barber.

The titles are:

- The Puggle Tales – Grandma Puggles Missing Silver Egg Timer (1981)
- A Puggle Tale – All's Well That Ends Well (1982) – illustrated by Steph Campbell
- An Uggle Tale – B.O. Has a High Old Time (1982) – illustrated by Chris Johnston
- A Fruggle Tale – Geoffrey the Magician (1982) – illustrated by Chris Johnston
- A Fruggle Tale – The Long and Short of it (1982) – illustrated by Steph Campbell
- A Puggle Tale – Penelope's Surprise (1982) – illustrated by Chris Johnston
- A Puggle Tale – Shruggle And The Egg (1982) – illustrated by Steph Campbell

The Story of the Puggle:

Once upon a time there were four million, three thousand, two hundred and one ... Puggle, but now there are only a few bagfuls left. Puggle lived in the Australian bush under the ground in tunnels. They came out of their holes at night to feed on their favourite tucker split peas! All night long they would puggle up every pea they could find, and as daylight approached, it would "dawn" on them that they had to get back home.

== Soft toys ==
A series of corresponding soft toys were sold for each of the five related species introduced in the tales.

- Puggles, including the white polar puggle
- Fruggles - green frog-like puggles with long rear legs
- Uggles - hairy puggles
- Shruggles
- Gruggles
