= Les Gilbert =

Australian musician (born 1946)

Les Gilbert (10 January 1946 - 17 August 2021) was an Australian musician who was a founding member of the 1960s band, Wild Cherries. He appeared on their early recordings, which, together with the band's four singles for Festival, have been picked up for a compilation album by the Half a Cow record company.

In 1990, Gilbert released a "Natural Symphony" CD titled Kakadu Billiabong which is an unedited, high quality recording of dawn at a billabong on Nourlangie Creek in Kakadu National Park in Northern Territory. There is no music overdub and the birds and other animals can be heard going about their usual morning routine.
