= Wild Cherries =

Australian rock band

The Wild Cherries
- Origin: Melbourne, Victoria, Australia
- Genres: R&B, jazz, psychedelia, hard rock
- Years active: 1964–1966, 1967–1969, 1971–1972, 2002
- Labels: Festival, Havoc, Raven, Half A Cow

The Wild Cherries were an Australian rock group, which started in late 1964 playing R&B/jazz and became "the most relentlessly experimental psychedelic band on the Melbourne discotheque / dance scene" according to commentator Glenn A. Baker.

The band had several personnel changes, the 1967 line-up featured Keith Barber on drums, Peter Eddey on bass guitar, founder Les Gilbert on keyboards, Lobby Loyde (ex-The Purple Hearts) on guitars, and Dan Robinson on vocals. The band released four singles for Festival Records, including "Krome Plated Yabby" in June 1967 and "That's Life" in November, which peaked into the Go-Set National Top 40. A compilation, The Wild Cherries: That's Life was released in 2007 by Half A Cow Records. Loyde went on to join Billy Thorpe & the Aztecs, then formed Lobby Loyde & the Coloured Balls and also had a solo career.

== Early years: 1964–1966 ==
In 1964, Melbourne University's Architecture students, John Bastow on vocals, Rob Lovett on rhythm guitar and vocals, and Les Gilbert on bass guitar, formed The Wild Cherries. Although Gilbert had studied classical piano with noted pianist Leslie Miers at an early age, he initially played bass guitar. The Wild Cherries were named by word association: Chuck Berry – Buck Cherry – Black Cherries – Wild Cherries. Local bluesman Malcolm McGee on lead guitar and vocals, and Geoff Hales on drums soon joined. Their debut performance was at Melbourne's first discothèque, the Fat Black Pussycat, located in South Yarra. Drummer Kevin Murphy, who had been playing in a modern jazz trio, replaced Hales almost immediately.

The new line up made a crude recording of Manfred Mann's "Without You" in Gilbert's parents' living room before Lovett left in October 1965 to join The Loved Ones. Reduced to a quartet, they made three more crude recordings at a rehearsal at the Fat Black Pussycat, including a cover of John D. Loudermilk's "Tobacco Road". Early in 1966, Murphy left to travel to the UK and English-born drummer, Keith Barber joined. Soon after his arrival, the quartet recorded two further tracks: an original composition, “Get out of My Life” and a cover of Sonny Boy Williamson's "Bye Bye Bird" but no label was interested in picking up their songs for a single. By June 1966, the group had disbanded and McGee left to join Python Lee Jackson while Bastow returned to his studies.

== Peak years: 1967–1969 ==
At the end of 1966, Barber and Gilbert reformed The Wild Cherries by recruiting singer Dan Robinson, who had previously played bass guitar in The Weird Mob, and added Peter Eddey on bass guitar, who was the founder and lead guitarist of The Weird Mob. Gilbert had switched to keyboards with a Hammond organ. After rehearsing for several months, former The Purple Hearts lead guitarist, Barry Lyde aka Lobby Loyde, from Brisbane, completed the second incarnation in January 1967.

The group immediately signed to Festival Records and in February travelled to Sydney to play a week-long engagement at Here disco in North Sydney filling in for the absent Jeff St John & The Id. The band then returned to Melbourne and started picking up local gigs, including an appearance at the Catcher on 4 March with The Clefs, The Mind Excursions and The Chelsea Set and playing a two-nighter at Sebastian's on 8–9 March. The Wild Cherries returned to Sydney in April for an extended engagement at Here Disco and attracted rave reviews from the local press. While there, they laid down tracks for a debut single, including the Loyde penned "Krome Plated Yabby" and a cover of Otis Redding's "Fa-Fa-Fa" which was never completed.

"Krome Plated Yabby" reached no 44 on the charts when it was released in June 1967, according to the Kent charts. The group followed it up with Loyde's "That's Life", which was released in November and became a minor hit in Melbourne, it peaked at No. 37 on the Go-Set National Top 40 in January 1968. By early 1968, Eddey had left to return to Sydney, and university, and John Phillips from The Running Jumping Standing Still joined on bass guitar.

The band's third single, released in April 1968, was "Gotta Stop Lying", which also failed to chart. For the group's final Festival single, Robinson and Loyde collaborated on the sublime "I Don't Care", which took the "wall of sound" approach, complete with echo effects, orchestration and female backing vocals. The Wild Cherries' crowning achievement on a creative level, it was another chart failure and the group underwent a mass exodus with founding member Les Gilbert first to leave in September 1968. Soon afterwards, Barber, Phillips and Robinson departed and Loyde retained the band's name. Rock historian, Ian McFarlane described their four singles for Festival as "exciting, revolutionary excursions into a musical void with no concessions to commercial demands [...] all remain classic examples of hard guitar psychedelia."

Loyde recruited Brisbane's Matt Taylor on vocals and harmonica from The Bay City Union and three musicians from another Brisbane group, Thursday's Children: Barry Harvey on drums, Steve Pristash on bass guitar and Barry Sullivan on rhythm guitar. The new version of The Wild Cherries performed in October 1968 but Loyde left within a month to join Billy Thorpe & the Aztecs. Brian Wilson joined on vocals to replace Taylor who left in November (eventually he joined Chain in 1970), Tim Piper joined The Wild Cherries on lead guitar in December 1968. The Wild Cherries disbanded in April 1969 without recording any further material. Harvey, Piper and Sullivan joined Chain in late 1969.

== Later years: 1971–1972 ==
Loyde resurrected the name in 1971 as a three-piece hard rock outfit with Johnny Dick on drums and Teddy Toi on bass guitar (both ex-Max Merritt & the Meteors, Billy Thorpe & the Aztecs, Fanny Adams). The new line-up of The Wild Cherries issued one single on the Havoc label, "I am the Sea (Stop Killing Me)" in November 1971. Raven Records included "I am the Sea (Stop Killing Me)" on the compilation Golden Miles: Australian Progressive Rock 1969–1974 released in 1994. The band appeared at the inaugural Sunbury Pop Festival in January 1972, but disbanded a month later.

== After disbanding ==
Loyde formed Lobby Loyde & the Coloured Balls in March 1972, while Dick and Toi later re-joined Billy Thorpe and the Aztecs. Loyde then established a solo career in the 1970s and was briefly a member of Rose Tattoo. Loyde died on 21 April 2007.

Gilbert dropped out of the music scene but in 1975 returned to university to study music, majoring in composition. He currently runs the company Magian Design Studio with his partner Gillian Chaplin and creates sound and multimedia installations.

Barber joined New Zealand band, the La De Da's and they travelled to the UK in April 1969 where they recorded a cover of the Beatles' "Come Together" for Parlophone Records. He stayed with the group until 1975. He died of cancer in May 2005.

Dan Robinson replaced Malcolm McGee in The Virgil Brothers and also travelled to the UK where the trio recorded a cover of The Knight Brothers' "Temptation's About To Get Me". He subsequently returned to Australia and later worked with the bands, Duck, Hit and Run, Champions, and Rite on the Nite.

Barber, Loyde, and Robinson reunited The Wild Cherries for Australia Day 2002, together with bass player Gavin Carroll and keyboard player John O'Brien, they performed The Wild Cherries' four Festival singles at the Corner Hotel in Richmond, Victoria. It was the first time that all of the band's recordings had been performed live and the first time that some of the tracks had been given a public airing. Half A Cow Records released a compilation album, The Wild Cherries: That's Life in 2007 shortly before Loyde's death.

Kevin Murphy, after leaving the band, travelled to the UK where he played with the Graham Bond Organization, returning to Australia in 1967. He also played with the Virgil Brothers in 1967, Doug Parkinson (1968), Rush (1969), and Billy Thorpe and the Aztecs during 1970–71. He died in 1994, aged about 48 years. He should not be confused with another drummer of the same name associated with Tina Arena, Tommy Emmanuel, and Peter Cupples.

== Personnel ==
- John Bastow – vocals (1964–1966)
- Malcolm McGee – lead guitar, vocals (1964–1966)
- Rob Lovett – rhythm guitar, vocals (1964–1965)
- Les Gilbert – bass guitar, keyboards: Hammond organ (1964–1966, 1967–1968)
- Geoff Hales – drums (1964)
- Kevin Murphy – drums (1964–1966)
- Keith Barber – drums (1966, 1967–1968, 2002)
- Dan Robinson – vocals (1967–1968, 2002)
- Peter Eddey – bass guitar (1967–1968)
- Lobby Loyde (aka Barry Lyde) – guitars (1967–1969, 1971–1972, 2002)
- John Phillips – bass guitar (1968)
- Matt Taylor – vocals, harmonica (1968)
- Barry Harvey – drums (1968–1969)
- Steve Pristash – bass guitar (1968–1969)
- Barry Sullivan – rhythm guitar (1968–1969)
- Brian Wilson – vocals (1968–1969)
- Tim Piper – lead guitar (1968–1969)
- Johnny Dick – drums (1971–1972)
- Teddy Toi – bass guitar (1971–1972)
- Gavin Carroll – bass guitar (2002)
- John O'Brien – keyboards (2002)
