= Jesuit Social Services =

Australian organisation

Coordinates: 37°49′18.67″S 144°59′50.75″E

- Abbreviation: JSS
- Established: 1977; 49 years ago
- Purpose: Social justice
- Location(s): 326 Church, Richmond; Victoria, Australia
- Region served: Australia-wide
- Official language: English
- CEO: Julie Edwards
- Parent organization: Australian Jesuits
- Affiliations: Jesuit, Catholic
- Budget: $6,500,000/year
- Website: JSS

Jesuit Social Services is a social change organisation established by the Australian Jesuits in 1977. Originally based in Melbourne, Australia, it has expanded to include outreach programs in New South Wales and the Northern Territory.

Jesuit Social Services conducts research and advocacy and delivers an array of programs in the areas of young people and adults in the justice system, mental health and wellbeing, education, training and employment, settlement and community building, violence prevention, and ecological justice. In 2020-2021 financial year, 8,249 people received direct support from the organisation.

In the 2020-2021 financial year 79% of the organisation's revenue was sourced from government income and grants.

== Vision and mission ==
As of 2021, Jesuit Social Services’ vision is building a just society, and its mission is standing in solidarity with those in need and expressing a faith that promotes justice.

== Timeline ==
Jesuit Social Services was established in 1977 when the Australian Jesuits opened a hostel – the ‘Four Flats’ in Hawthorn – for young people aged 17–21 recently released from Victorian correctional institutions. Four Flats moved to Collingwood in 1981 and developed into an outreach and supported accommodation centre.

In 1984, the organisation established the Youth Grow Garden Project in the grounds of the Abbotsford Convent. The social enterprise project provided horticulture and labouring employment to young people.

In 1987, the Brosnan Centre (formerly Four Flats) moved to Sydney Road, Brunswick, and by 1996 it oversaw housing for 171 young people. Also in 1987, Jesuit Social Services established a rooming house in Carlton for young men released from prison.

By 1995 Jesuit Social Services was officially incorporated. Around this time the organisation purchased property in Langridge Street, Collingwood, where the newly established Connexions program would run. Connexions was Victoria's first dual diagnosis service, supporting young people with both mental health issues and drug use problems.

The following year, in 1996, Jesuit Social Services established a number of new services including Parenting Australia, The Outdoor Experience (TOE), Richmond Community Care, the Vietnamese Welfare Resource Centre, and Big Brothers Big Sisters (which became independent in 2002). The organisation also took charge of New Family Home of Jesuit Refugee Service, for young Vietnamese people without family in secondary and tertiary studies.

After the closure of Pentridge Prison in 1997 Jesuit Social Services ran public tours and commissioned artists to decorate the cells with paintings for the ‘In the Can’ exhibit, drawing 360,300 people. During this time the organisation gained exposure for its work – led by Father John Brosnan – “educating the community about the nature of the prison world”. Also in 1997, Jesuit Social Services established its Arts and Culture program, designed to engage marginalised young people through art and music, (later renamed Artful Dodgers Studios), and Perry House, a supported residence in Reservoir for young people with intellectual disabilities involved with the justice system.

In 1998, the Ignatius Centre for research, policy and advocacy was established in Richmond. Jesuit Social Services' headquarters remain located there. That year the organisation also launched the Domestic Violence Prevention Program, a national program working with young people to prevent domestic violence.

In 1999, the organisation published Unequal In Life, authored by Professor Tony Vinson, which investigates the distribution of social disadvantage in Victorian and New South Wales by postcode. As of 2021, Jesuit Social Services has published a total of five reports on locational disadvantage, with later reports expanding to examine marginalisation and disadvantage across Australia.

The Brosnan Centre moved to Dawson Street, Brunswick, in 2000. Around this time Jesuit Social Services launched the Bridging the Gap program, which provided transitional support to young adults leaving prison. The program was coupled with an increased effort to work with men in prison to strengthen relationships with their families. Also during this time, Communities Together was established to encompass the community development work being done in the public housing estates of Richmond, Collingwood and Fitzroy.

In 2002, the Gateway program was established to support marginalised young people on a pathway to education, training and employment. Over the next five years the organisation established programs such as the Community Justice Group Conferencing program (2003), which is based on principles of restorative justice, Support After Suicide (2004), which provides free and professional counselling for people bereaved by suicide, and The African Program (2005), which supported newly arrived communities at the Flemington public housing estate.

In 2006, Jesuit Social Services was awarded the International Spirit at Work Award in New York. Also in 2006, the organisation was granted registered training organisation (RTO) status in Business Services, Community Services, Visual Arts and Craft Design, and Outdoor Recreation training.

In 2007, Jesuit Social Services celebrated its 30th anniversary with guest appearances from journalist Martin Flanagan and singer/songwriter Paul Kelly. The same year saw the initiation of a full-service program for women before and after their release from prison.

In 2008 Jesuit Social Services expanded its outreach to Mt. Druitt in Western Sydney, in partnership with Holy Family Parish. On invitation from local stakeholders the organisation also began working in Alice Springs to support communities with capacity building and advocacy.

At the Jesuit's 35th General Congregation meeting in 2008 Jesuit ministries were called upon to develop programs and initiatives that support the environment. Since then, Jesuit Social Services has focused greater attention on ecological justice. A number of the organisation's existing programs, including The Outdoor Experience, Perry House and Artful Dodgers Studios have become more environmentally conscious through community gardening, bush-focused art and education.

In 2008, the Konnect Indigenous program was developed to offer support to Indigenous people leaving prison.

Jesuit Social Services published Doing Justice: Reflections from thirty years of Jesuit Social Services, 1977-2007 (by Josephine Dunin) in 2009. The book charted the organisation's 30-year history of serving the community.

In 2009, the Just Leadership Breakfast Series was launched to foster the efforts of young professionals and leaders to build a just society. Also in 2009 the organisation launched its Economic Inclusion Program (renamed African Australian Inclusion Program), in partnership with National Australia Bank, to find work experience for skilled African Australians. The program has since been amalgamated into the Corporate Diversity Partnerships program. A mentoring program for African men exiting prison was also established in 2010.

Jesuit Community College, a Registered Training Organisation and Learn Local organisation, was founded in 2011 to bring literacy and communication skills to people whose education has been interrupted. The same year the Ignite Food Store and Op Shop was opened in Western Sydney to offer affordable food and clothes to the local community. It includes a retail training centre and hospitality training space, Ignite Café. Also in 2011, a post-detention program was established for unaccompanied minors from Iran, Iraq, Afghanistan, Burma, and Vietnam.

In 2012, Jesuit Social Services launched Next Steps, which works with young people aged 16–24 years old who have involvement with the justice system and are experiencing or at risk of homelessness. Next Steps provides residential supported accommodation at the organisation's Dillon House location. The same year, Jesuit Social Services published Our Environmental Way of Proceeding, a framework which guides the organisation's engagement with ecology.

In 2014, in partnership with Cabrini Health, Jesuit Social Services established the Catholic Alliance for People Seeking Asylum (CAPSA). CAPSA “aims to change hearts and minds across Australia in support of the abolition of harsh asylum seeker policies”. The Alliance seeks the cooperation of Catholic schools, parishes and fellow organisations across Australia.

Jesuit Social Services continued to expand its reach in the Northern Territory in 2016, bringing the Group Conferencing program to Darwin. The organisation's work in New South Wales expanded to Willmot with the establishment of the Community Hub project, which provides a range of services including education and employment services, health services, and youth engagement programs. In the same year Jesuit Community College won six awards at the Community Work Partnerships Awards for its work linking people who have had contact with the justice system with learning and training opportunities as a pathway to employment.

In 2017, Jesuit Social Services celebrated its 40th anniversary alongside 430 guests, with an address from Senator Patrick Dodson and a special performance from singer/songwriter Archie Roach. At the celebration the organisation announced a new initiative, The Men's Project, a violence prevention project which aims to support boys and men to live respectful, accountable and fulfilling lives free from violence and harmful behaviour, through approaches that improve men and boys' wellbeing.

In early 2017, newly arrived people from culturally diverse backgrounds engaged in photography training and produced works that were featured at the Diversity Through the Lens exhibition held at Sunshine Library and venues across Brimbank. On the #JusticeSolutions Tour in the same year, senior leaders at the organisation explored innovative and best practice approaches to youth justice in Norway, Spain and Germany, as well as parts of the US and UK. The resulting report outlined a vision for youth justice systems across Australia. The same year, the organisation convened a forum on restorative justice in Darwin. Around this time, it also ran the Enabling Justice Project in partnership with RMIT's Centre for Innovative Justice, which focused on improving the way the criminal justice system responds to people with an acquired brain injury.

The #WorthASecondChance campaign was launched in 2018 with the aim of building a groundswell of community support for a fairer youth justice system in Victoria. Also in 2018, Jesuit Social Services launched the Victoria Police Diversity Recruitment Program. The program seeks to increase the number of African-Australians from refugee and other backgrounds in Victoria Police and supports African-Australians to overcome the barriers they have encountered in successfully navigating the police recruitment process. The organisation also launched the Grandmothers Justice Program in Central Australia, working in remote communities along the Plenty Highway to support the mothers and grandmothers whose young people are engaged in the youth justice system.

In 2018, Jesuit Social Services established the Ecological Justice Hub, in Brunswick. The Hub is a permaculture garden dedicated to social and environmental justice, and runs a range of workshops and training programs to help community members learn new skills and lead more sustainable lives.

Major Projects Jobs Service was established in May 2019. The program assists young people aged between 17 and 30 years looking for work in the construction industry with the training and mentoring they need to succeed in the workplace. Through the program, Jesuit Social Services assists employers to access a pool of potential job ready and culturally diverse employees.

Building on its 2017 tour of parts of Europe and the US, senior leaders at Jesuit Social Services embarked on a study trip to New Zealand in early 2019. Around 2019 Jesuit Social Service also initiated two pilot programs, RESTORE (developed in partnership with Melbourne Children's Court) and Breaking the Cycle. Both programs are based on restorative justice principles of holding young people accountable for their actions while keeping them and their families safe.

In 2020, the Maribyrnong Community Residential Facility Transitional Support program was established to provide housing and support to people leaving custody.

In 2021, Jesuit Social Services launched the Centre for Just Places, which supports resilient, inclusive and regenerative communities through research, action and advocacy for place-based solutions to social and ecological justice problems. The same year, the organisation also established the Ignatius Learning Centre, a small specialist secondary school located in Richmond, for young people in contact with the justice system.

Also in 2021, Jesuit Social Services and the Northern Australian Aboriginal Justice Agency (NAAJA) hosted the 5th National Justice Symposium, and the third Northern Territory Climate Justice Forum.

== Research and advocacy ==
Jesuit Social Services conducts research and advocacy on issues such as young people and adults in the justice system, education, training and employment pathways, housing, people with complex needs, people seeking asylum, entrenched disadvantage, mental health and wellbeing, family violence, ecological justice and gender justice.

In the financial year 2020-2021 the organisation made 31 submissions to State, Territory and Commonwealth Government and Parliamentary Inquiries, Reviews and Royal Commissions.

For 20 years, Jesuit Social Services has led research on locational disadvantage. The organisation has published a number of research reports on the topic, including Unequal in Life (1999), Unequal in Health (2001), Community Adversity and Resilience (2004), Dropping Off the Edge (2007), Moving From the Edge (2010), Dropping Off the Edge (2015), and Dropping Off the Edge (2021). Before 2021, the reports were led by the late Professor Tony Vinson. Earlier reports examined disadvantage in Victoria and New South Wales. Later, the reports expanded to examine disadvantage in every state and territory. The research is used by federal, state and local governments and communities to inform decision-making and tailor program delivery.

Jesuit Social Services also produced the Man Box research (The Man Box, and Unpacking the Man Box), the first comprehensive study that focuses on the attitudes to manhood and behaviours of young Australian men aged 18 to 30.

In 2021, Jesuit Social Services established the Centre for Just Places (the centre), which engages in research, action and advocacy to enable and support place-based approaches to social and ecological justice problems, such as climate change adaptation and resilience in a local community context.

== See also ==
- List of Jesuit sites
