= Dan Robinson (singer) =

- Born: 15 March 1947 (age 79); Warrnambool, Victoria, Australia
- Occupations: bass player, singer
- Instrument: Bass guitar

Dan Robinson (born 15 March 1947 in Warrnambool, Victoria, Australia) is a singer who fronted the second incarnation of Melbourne Sixties band, The Wild Cherries and later became a member of the vocal trio The Virgil Brothers.

He attended Melbourne Grammar School where he was a boarder and played the bass in the School Orchestra. He graduated from the Conservatorium of Music at the University of Melbourne with a B.Mus. (Composition).

Following his work with The Wild Cherries and The Virgil Brothers, in 1970 Robinson recorded a cover of Cat Stevens' recent song Wild World. The single was released under the name Fourth House and entered the charts nationally around Australia.

In the 1970s and 80s, he played in his country band Hit & Run while also working as a session musician.

During the 1980s, he moved to Tasmania and established a business making musical instruments. He is now a highly regarded Luthier based in Anglesea.

Robinson joined The Wild Cherries in 2002 when they reformed for a one-off concert at the Corner Hotel in Richmond.
