= List of Rose Tattoo members =

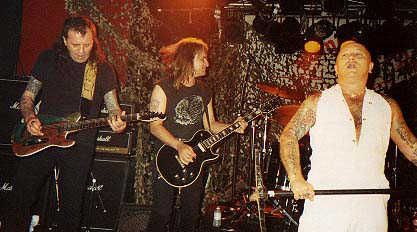
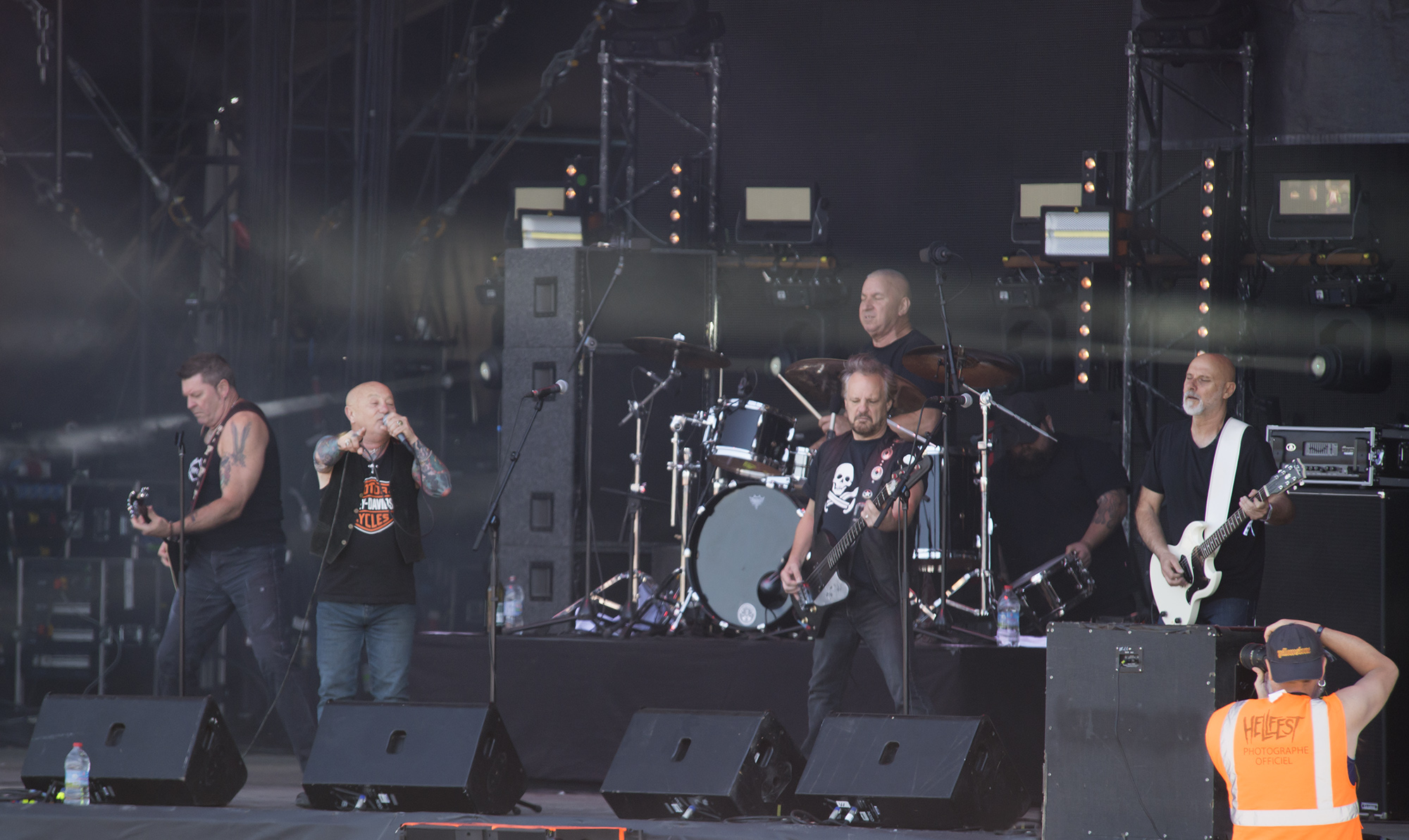
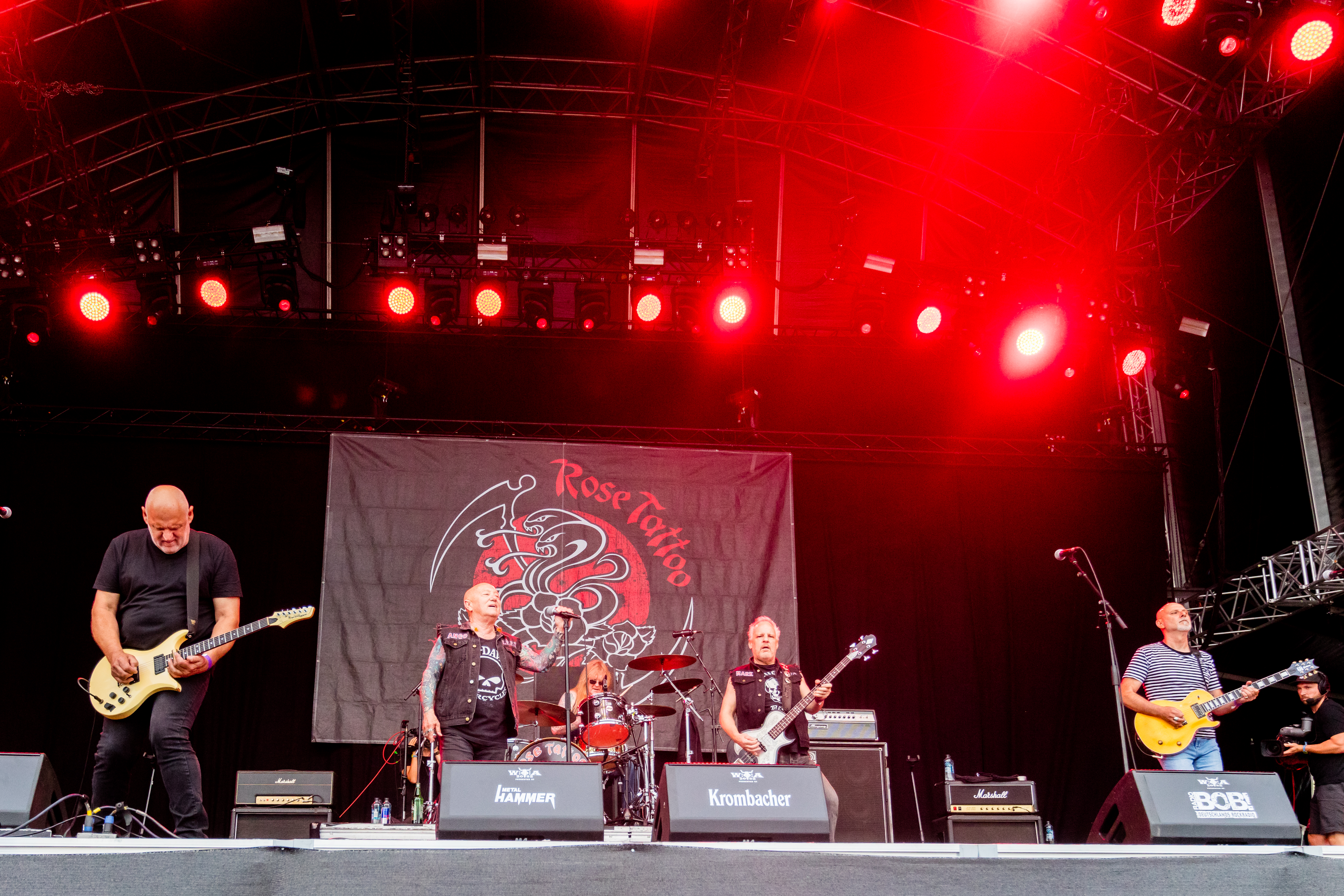
Three line-ups of Rose Tattoo performing in 1993, 2018, 2022.

Rose Tattoo are an Australian rock and roll band, founded by slide guitarist Pete Wells in 1976, lead vocalist Tony Lake, rhythm guitarist Leigh Johnston, bassist Ian Rilen, and drummer Michael Vandersluys completed the bands first line-up. The band's most recent lineup consisted of lead vocalist Angry Anderson (from 1976 until his death in 2026), drummer Paul DeMarco (who first joined in 1992), bassist Steve King (who first joined in 2000) and guitarists Mick Arnold and Ronnie Simmons (both since 2022).

== History ==
Rose Tattoo were formed in Sydney in 1976 with Leigh Johnston on rhythm guitar, Tony Lake on lead vocals and they were led by slide guitarist Peter Wells. Drummer Michael Vandersluys completed the line-up. Ian Rilen from Band of Light soon joined on bass guitar, guitarist Mick Cocks soon replaced Johnston. Lake and Vandersluys were substituted by former Buster Brown members Angry Anderson and Dallas "Digger" Royall, respectively.

in 1977 Rillen departed, Buster Brown bass guitarist Geordie Leach was recruited to record their self-titled debut LP, Rose Tattoo. Leach left the band in May 1979 and was replaced by Neil Smith, before Lobby Loyde joined in October. By September 1980, Loyde had left and Leach returned.

Robin Riley replaced Cocks in 1982. In 1983, after the US tour, Riley, Royall and Wells all left. The remaining duo of Anderson and Leach recruited guitarists Greg Jordan and John Meyer, and drummer Scott Johnston. After recording 1984's Southern Stars, Leach left and the band went on a brief hiatus while Anderson pursued acting.

In 1985, Rose Tattoo returned with the line-up of Anderson, Johnston, Meyer, Andy Cichon (bass, piano) and Tim Gaze (slide guitar), Meyer left in 1986 and the remaining line-up recorded Beats from a Single Drum. Cichon left in late 1986 and was replaced by Jake Lardot (bass) and Rick Melick (keys) before the band disbanded in 1987.

In the late 1980s, Anderson tried to reunite Rose Tattoo, but Dallas Royall died in 1991. Rose Tattoo supported Guns N' Roses on the Australian leg of their Use Your Illusion Tour. Anderson, Wells, Cocks, Leach were joined by new drummer, Paul DeMarco, from Wells' solo band reunited for the 1993 tour. The reunion was brief as each returned to solo projects.

Rose Tattoo, with original bassist Ian Rilen replacing Leach, reformed yet again in 1998 for the "All Hell Breaks Loose!!" tour, however Rilen remained with the band only for the duration of this tour. By the following year, Leach had returned to the fold once more, although his place was taken by Steve King in 2000, around the same time Cocks departed and was replaced by a returning Riley.

In 2002, Wells was diagnosed with Prostate Cancer, but he continued to perform with Rose Tattoo, although he was subbed in 2004 by Dai Pritchard. Wells died on 27 March 2006, Cocks returned in 2005, with Riley moving onto slide guitar in Wells absence. Mick O'Shea briefly replaced DeMarco in 2005. Dai Pritchard returned in 2007, replacing Riley, alongside a returning Leach, replacing King. Mick Cocks died of liver cancer on 22 December 2009, he had previously been subbed by Riley who stayed after his death, until his departure in 2011. Guitarist Randall Waller joined as Riley's replacement, Geordie Leach left in 2013. Rose Tattoo were inactive following the arrest and imprisonment of drummer Paul DeMarco.

The band returned in 2017, with Anderson and Pritchard joined by bassist Mark Evans, guitarist Bob Spencer, and drummer John Watson. Watson was replaced by Jackie Barnes in 2018, Barnes was replaced by Justin Ngariki in 2019, who had previously subbed for him in 2018. Pritchard departed in April 2021.

In 2022 the band were joined by Mick Arnold on slide guitar and returning Paul DeMarco on drums. Bob Spencer departed in late 2022 and was replaced by Ronnie Simmons. In May 2024, Mark Evans was replaced by a returning Steve King.

== Members ==
=== Current ===
Image	Name	Years active	Instruments	Release contributions
	Paul DeMarco	1992–1993; 1998–2014; 2021–present	drums	25 to Life (2000); Pain (2002); Blood Brothers (2007)
	Steve King	2000–2007; 2024–present	bass guitar; backing vocals	25 to Life (2000); Pain (2002); Blood Brothers (2007)
	Mick Arnold	2022–present	slide guitar; backing vocals	none to date
	Ronnie Simmons	2022–present	guitar; backing vocals	none to date

=== Former ===
Image	Name	Years active	Instruments	Release contributions
	Peter Wells	1976–1983; 1992–1993; 1998–2006 (until his death)	slide guitar; vocals; bass guitar	all releases from Rose Tattoo (1978) to Scarred for Life (1982); 25 to Life (2000); Pain (2002); Tatts – Live in Brunswick (2017)
	Ian Rilen	1976–1977; 1998 (died 2006)	bass guitar; vocals	Rose Tattoo (1978)
	Tony Lake	1976	lead vocals	none
	Michael "Stork" Vandersluys	1976	drums	none
	Leigh Johnston	1976	guitar	none
	Angry Anderson	1976–1987; 1992–1993; 1998–2026 (until his death)	lead vocals	all releases
	Mick Cocks	1976–1982; 1992–1993; 1998–2000; 2005–2009 (until his death)	guitar; backing vocals	Rose Tattoo (1978); Assault & Battery (1981); Blood Brothers (2007)
	Dallas "Digger" Royall	1976–1983 (died 1991)	drums	all releases from Rose Tattoo (1978) to Scarred for Life (1982); Tatts – Live in Brunswick (2017)
	Gordon "Geordie" Leach	1977–1979; 1980–1984; 1992–1993; 1999; 2007–2013	bass guitar; backing vocals	all releases from Rose Tattoo (1978) to Southern Stars (1984); Tatts – Live in Brunswick (2017)
	Neil Smith	1979 (died 2013)	bass guitar	none
	Lobby Loyde	1979–1980 (died 2007)	bass guitar	none
	Robin Riley	1982–1983; 2000–2006; 2009–2011	guitar; slide guitar (2005–2006)	Scarred for Life (1982); 25 to Life (2000); Pain (2002); Tatts – Live in Brunswick (2017)
	Scott Johnston	1983–1987	drums; backing vocals	Southern Stars (1984); Beats from a Single Drum (1986)
	John Meyer	1983–1985 (died 2020)	guitar	Southern Stars (1984)
	Greg Jordan	1983–1985	slide guitar; guitar	Southern Stars (1984)
	Tim Gaze	1985–1987	slide guitar; guitar	Beats from a Single Drum (1986)
	Andy Cichon	1985–1986	bass guitar; piano; keyboards; backing vocals	Beats from a Single Drum (1986)
	Rick Melick	1987	keyboards	none
	Jake Lardot	1987	bass guitar	none
	Dai Pritchard	2004; 2007–2021	slide guitar	Blood Brothers (2007); Outlaws (2020)
	Mick O'Shea	2005	drums	none
	Randall Waller	2013–2016	guitar	none
	Bob Spencer	2017–2022	guitar	Outlaws (2020)
	Mark Evans	2017–2024	bass guitar; backing vocals	Outlaws (2020)
	John Watson	2017–2018	drums	none
	Jackie Barnes	2018–2019	drums	Outlaws (2020)
	Justin Ngariki	2018; 2019–2021	drums	none

== Line-ups ==
Period	Members	Releases
early 1976	Tony Lake – lead vocals; Peter Wells – slide guitar, bass guitar; Leigh Johnston – guitar; Michael Vandersluys – drums	none
early 1976	Tony Lake – lead vocals; Peter Wells – slide guitar; Leigh Johnston – guitar; Michael Vandersluys – drums; Ian Rilen – bass guitar	none
early 1976	Tony Lake – lead vocals; Peter Wells – slide guitar; Michael Vandersluys – drums; Ian Rilen – bass guitar; Mick Cocks – guitar	none
mid 1976 – 1977	Peter Wells – slide guitar; Ian Rilen – bass guitar; Mick Cocks – guitar; Angry Anderson – lead vocals; Dallas "Digger" Royall – drums	Rose Tattoo (1978) three tracks
1977 – May 1979	Peter Wells – slide guitar; Mick Cocks – guitar; Angry Anderson – lead vocals; Dallas "Digger" Royall – drums; Geordie Leach – bass guitar	Rose Tattoo (1978) remaining tracks
May – October 1979	Peter Wells – slide guitar; Mick Cocks – guitar; Angry Anderson – lead vocals; Dallas "Digger" Royall – drums; Neil Smith – bass guitar	none
October 1979 – September 1980	Peter Wells – slide guitar; Mick Cocks – guitar; Angry Anderson – lead vocals; Dallas "Digger" Royall – drums; Lobby Loyde – bass guitar	none
September 1980 – 1982	Peter Wells – slide guitar; Mick Cocks – guitar; Angry Anderson – lead vocals; Dallas "Digger" Royall – drums; Geordie Leach – bass guitar	Assault & Battery (1981)
1982 – 1983	Peter Wells – slide guitar; Angry Anderson – lead vocals; Dallas "Digger" Royall – drums; Geordie Leach – bass guitar; Robin Riley – guitar	Scarred for Life (1982); Tatts – Live in Brunswick (2017)
1983 – 1984	Angry Anderson – lead vocals; Geordie Leach – bass guitar; Greg Jordan – slide guitar; John Meyer – guitar; Scott Johnston – drums	Southern Stars (1984)
1985 – 1986	Angry Anderson – lead vocals; John Meyer – guitar; Scott Johnston – drums; Tim Gaze – slide guitar; Andy Cichon – bass guitar, piano	none
1986	Angry Anderson – lead vocals; Scott Johnston – drums, backing vocals; Tim Gaze – slide guitar, guitar; Andy Cichon – bass guitar, piano, keyboards, backing vocals	Beats from a Single Drum (1986)
1987	Angry Anderson – lead vocals; Scott Johnston – drums; Tim Gaze – slide guitar, guitar; Jake Lardot – bass guitar; Rick Melick – keyboards	none
Inactive 1987 – 1992
1992 – 1993	Angry Anderson – lead vocals; Peter Wells – slide guitar; Mick Cocks – guitar; Geordie Leach – bass guitar; Paul DeMarco – drums	none
Inactive 1993 – 1998
1998	Angry Anderson – lead vocals; Peter Wells – slide guitar; Mick Cocks – guitar; Paul DeMarco – drums; Ian Rillen – bass guitar	none
1999	Angry Anderson – lead vocals; Peter Wells – slide guitar; Mick Cocks – guitar; Paul DeMarco – drums; Geordie Leach – bass guitar	none
2000 – 2004	Angry Anderson – lead vocals; Peter Wells – slide guitar; Paul DeMarco – drums; Steve King – bass guitar; Robin Riley – guitar	25 to Life (2000); Pain (2002)
2004	Angry Anderson – lead vocals; Paul DeMarco – drums; Steve King – bass guitar; Robin Riley – guitar; Dai Pritchard – slide guitar (substitute)	none
2004 – 2005	Angry Anderson – lead vocals; Paul DeMarco – drums; Steve King – bass guitar; Robin Riley – guitar; Peter Wells – slide guitar	none
2005	Angry Anderson – lead vocals; Steve King – bass guitar; Robin Riley – guitar; Peter Wells – slide guitar; Mick O'Shea – drums (substitute)	none
2005 – 2006	Angry Anderson – lead vocals; Paul DeMarco – drums; Steve King – bass guitar; Robin Riley – slide guitar; Mick Cocks – guitar	none
2006 – 2007	Angry Anderson – lead vocals; Paul DeMarco – drums; Steve King – bass guitar; Mick Cocks – guitar; Dai Pritchard – slide guitar	Blood Brothers (2007)
2007 – 2009	Angry Anderson – lead vocals; Paul DeMarco – drums; Mick Cocks – guitar; Dai Pritchard – slide guitar; Georgie Leach – bass guitar	none
2009 – 2011	Angry Anderson – lead vocals; Paul DeMarco – drums; Dai Pritchard – slide guitar; Georgie Leach – bass guitar; Robin Riley – guitar	none
2011 – 2013	Angry Anderson – lead vocals; Paul DeMarco – drums; Dai Pritchard – slide guitar; Georgie Leach – bass guitar; Randall Waller – guitar	none
Inactive 2013 – 2017
2017 – 2018	Angry Anderson – lead vocals; Dai Pritchard – slide guitar; Bob Spencer – guitar; Mark Evans – bass guitar; John Watson – drums	none
2018 – 2019	Angry Anderson – lead vocals; Dai Pritchard – slide guitar; Bob Spencer – guitar; Mark Evans – bass guitar; Jackie Barnes – drums	Outlaws (2020)
2019 – 2021	Angry Anderson – lead vocals; Dai Pritchard – slide guitar; Bob Spencer – guitar; Mark Evans – bass guitar; Justin Ngariki – drums	none
2022	Angry Anderson – lead vocals; Bob Spencer – guitar; Mark Evans – bass guitar; Paul DeMarco – drums; Mick Arnold – slide guitar	none
2022 – present	Angry Anderson – lead vocals; Mark Evans – bass guitar; Paul DeMarco – drums; Mick Arnold – slide guitar; Ronnie Simmons – guitar	none to date
