= Rose Tattoo discography =

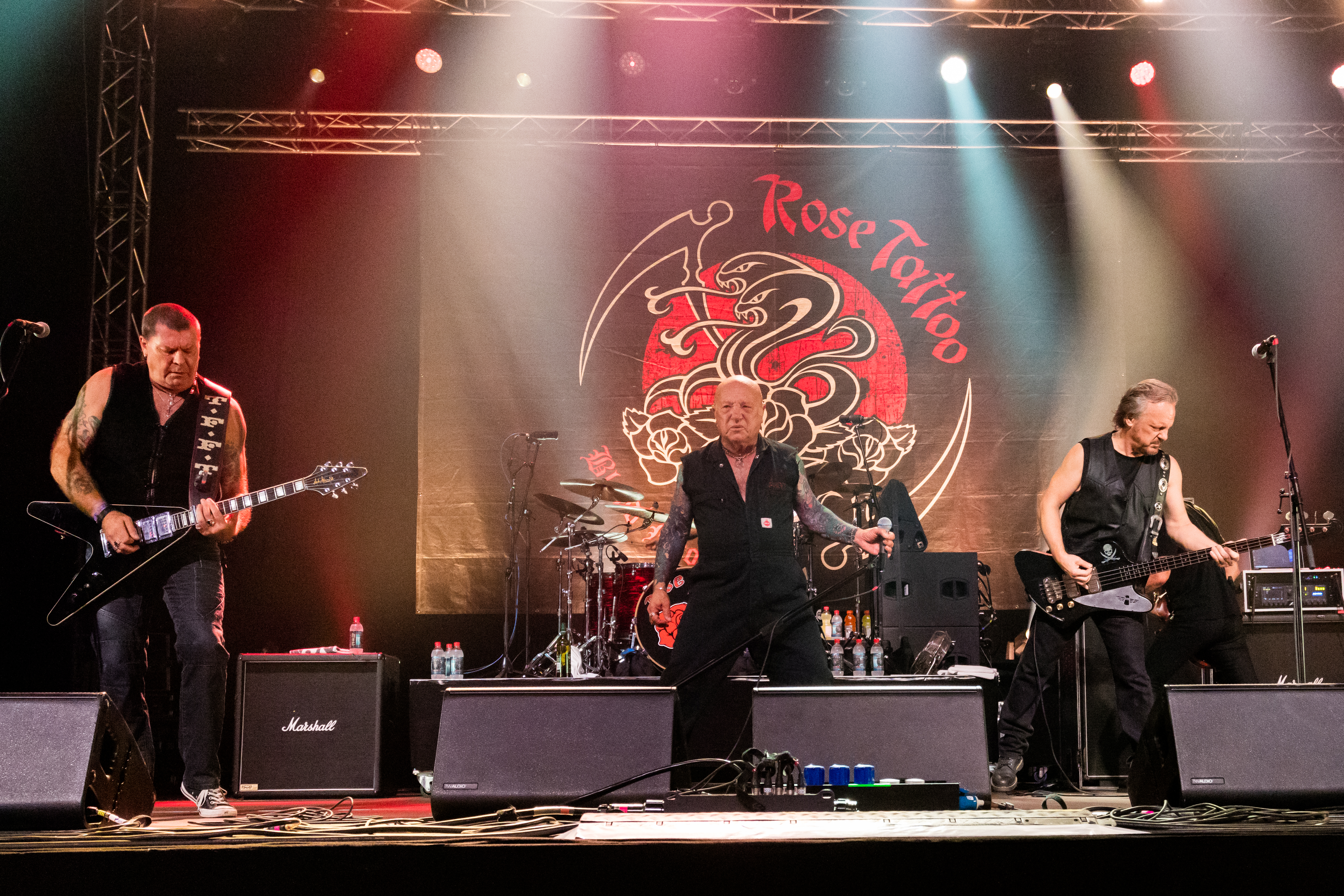
Rose Tattoo at Wacken Open Air 2019

The discography of Australian hard rock band Rose Tattoo includes eight studio albums, five live albums, seven compilation albums and twenty-one singles.

== Albums ==
=== Studio albums ===
Title	Album details	Peak chart positions	
Title	Album details	AUS	UK
Rose Tattoo	Released: October 1978; Label: Albert Productions (APLP-032); Formats: LP	40	—
Assault & Battery	Released: September 1981; Label: Albert Productions (APLP-049); Formats: LP	27	40
Scarred for Life	Released: October 1982; Label: Albert Productions (APLP-056); Formats: LP	11	—
Southern Stars	Released: October 1984; Label: Albert Productions (APLP-431063); Formats: LP	30	—
Beats from a Single Drum	Released: November 1986; Label: Mushroom (RML-53217); Formats: LP	35	—
Pain	Released: 2002; Label: SPV GmbH (085-74212); Formats: LP, CD	—	—
Blood Brothers	Released: 2007; Label: Armageddon (AMG 059-2); Formats: LP, CD	—	—
Outlaws	Released: 2020; Label: Cleopatra (CL01544CD); Formats: LP, CD	—	—

=== Live albums ===
Title	Album details
25 to Life	Released: 2000; Label: SPV GmbH (085-72092); Formats: CD, LP
Tatts – Live in Brunswick	Released: February 2017; Label: Golden Robot (GOLDRR011); Formats: CD, LP
Scarred for Live 1980 - 1982	Released: December 2018; Label: Golden Robot; Formats: digital
Staunch As At SS&A (Live)	Released: September 2022; Label: Rose Tattoo; Formats: digital
Boggo Road Jail '93	Released: April 2024; Label: Rose Tattoo; Formats: digital

=== Compilation albums ===
Title	Album details	Peak chart positions
Title	Album details	AUS
A Decade of Rock	Released: March 1986; Label: Albert Productions (APLP-431067); Formats: LP	15
Their Greatest Hits	Released: 1987; Label: Dino Music (DINO50); Formats: LP	—
Angry Metal	Released: 1989; Label: Repertoire (RR 2010-DL); Formats: LP, CD	—
Nice Boys Don't Play Rock 'n' Roll	Released: 1992; Label: Albert Productions (472469); Formats: CD	121
Never Too Loud	Released: 1997; Label: Repertoire (REP 4601-WO); Formats: CD	—
The Essential Rose Tattoo	Released: 2013; Label: Alberts/ Sony Music Australia (88883774882); Formats: CD, DD	—
Keef's Free	Released: 2017; Label: Repertoire (REP2380 V275); Formats: LP	—

=== Box Set ===
Title	Album details
The Albums 1981-84	Released: 20 February 2026; Label: Cherry Red (CDLEM4BX264); Formats: 4×CD; Includes first 4 studio albums, with the 1978 being the 1981 re-issue version.

== Singles ==
List of singles, with selected chart positions
Title	Year	Peak chart positions			Album
Title	Year	AUS	NZ	UK	Album
"Bad Boy for Love"	1977	19	—	—	Rose Tattoo
"Rock 'n' Roll Outlaw"	1978	68	—	60	Rose Tattoo
"One of the Boys"	1978	95	—	—	Rose Tattoo
"Release Legalise" (with Cole Paterson)	1980	—	—	—	Non-album single
"Rock 'n' Roll Is King"	1981	60	—	—	Assault & Battery
"Assault & Battery" (UK only)	1981	—	—	—	Assault & Battery
"Out of This Place"	1982	—	—	—	Assault & Battery
"We Can't Be Beaten"	1982	28	47	—	Scarred for Life
"Branded"	1983	97	—	—	Scarred for Life
"It's Gonna Work Itself Out"	1983	—	—	—	Scarred for Life
"I Wish"	1984	32	—	—	Southern Stars
"Freedom Flame"	1984	—	—	—	Southern Stars
"No Secrets"	1985	—	—	—	Southern Stars
"Born to Be Wild"	1985	25	—	—	Non-album single
"Calling"	1986	24	—	—	Beats from a Single Drum
"Get It Right"	1986	100	—	—	Beats from a Single Drum
"Falling"	1987	100	—	—	Beats from a Single Drum
"Bad Boy for Love" (re-release)	1993	102	—	—	Nice Boys Don't Play Rock 'n' Roll
"All Hell Broke Loose"	1998	—	—	—	Nice Boys Don't Play Rock 'n' Roll
"Black-Eyed Bruiser"	2006	—	—	—	Blood Brothers
"Hard Road"	2025	—	—	—	
