= A Decade of Rock =

Compilation album by Rose Tattoo
- Released: March 1986
- Label: Albert Productions

Rose Tattoo chronology
| Southern Stars (1984) | A Decade of Rock (1986) | Beats from a Single Drum (1986) |

A Decade of Rock is the first compilation album by Australian hard rock band Rose Tattoo. It was released in March 1986 and peaked at number 15 on the Kent Music Report. it was the band's final release on the Albert Productions label.

== Track listing ==
A Decade of Rock side A
| No. | Title | Writer(s) | original album | Length |
|---|---|---|---|---|
| 1. | "Bad Boy For Love" | Ian Rilen | Rose Tattoo | 3:00 |
| 2. | "One of the Boys" | Angry Anderson, Mick Cocks, Georgie Leach, Dallas Royall, Peter Wells | Rose Tattoo | 3:08 |
| 3. | "The Butcher and Fast Eddy" | Anderson, Cocks, Leach, Royal, Wells | Rose Tattoo | 6:30 |
| 4. | "Rock n Roll Outlaw" | Anderson, Cocks, Leach, Royal, Wells | Rose Tattoo | 3:18 |
| 5. | "Stuck on You" | Anderson, Cocks, Leach, Royal, Wells | Rose Tattoo | 3:55 |
| 6. | "Southern Stars" | Anderson, Greg Jordan, John Meyer | Southern Stars | 4:22 |
| 7. | "Death or Glory" | Anderson, Jordan | Southern Stars | 3:00 |

A Decade of Rock side B
| No. | Title | Writer(s) | original album | Length |
|---|---|---|---|---|
| 1. | "Scarred for Life" | Anderson, Robin Riley, Royal | Scarred for Life | 2:45 |
| 2. | "Rock n Roll Is King" | Anderson, Cocks | Assault & Battery | 3:22 |
| 3. | "I Wish" | Anderson, Meyer | Southern Stars | 4:24 |
| 4. | "Assault and Battery" | Anderson, Cocks | Assault & Battery | 3:25 |
| 5. | "No Secrets" | Anderson, Meyer | Southern Stars | 3:58 |
| 6. | "We Can't Be Beaten" | Anderson, Riley | Scarred for Life | 3:05 |
| 7. | "Branded" | Anderson, Riley | Scarred for Life | 5:20 |

== Charts ==
Chart performance for A Decade of Rock
| Chart (1986) | Peak position |
|---|---|
| Australian Albums (Kent Music Report) | 15 |
