= Sebastian Chase =

Australian talent manager, record label owner

- Born: Sydney, New South Wales, Australia
- Occupations: Manager, record label owner, record distributor
- Years active: 1972–present
- Known for: MGM Distribution
- Spouse: Cheryle ? (?–1988, div.)
- Partner: Kylie Greenlees (?–2015, her death)

Sebastian Chase is an Australian music industry businessman. He is the founding CEO of MGM Distribution from April 1998. Chase began his career as a manager in the early 1970s, working for Band of Light, Buffalo, Rose Tattoo, Dragon and the Reels. By 1984 he had established his own label Chase Records. Four years later he formed rooArt with C.M. Murphy and Justin Van Stom, but left that label for Phantom Records in 1991. He established MGM Distribution with his domestic partner, Kylie Greenlees. Greenlees died in 2015, aged 52. At the 2016 ARIA Music Awards Chase received the ARIA Icon Award for his contributions to the Australian music industry.

== Biography ==
Sebastian Chase is the son of Italian immigrants, who changed his name to avoid racism during the 1960s in Sydney. He grew up in the western suburbs and after leaving compulsory schooling, his first job was promoting local dances. In 1972, Chase was booking entertainers for Chequers nightclub, Sydney and met Phil Key. New Zealand-born Key was leaving the La De Da's and wanted help to form a new blues rock group, Band of Light, which they assembled by October. He established Chase Management and became their manager. Soon, he was also working for hard rockers, Buffalo, While managing Band of Light he met their bass guitarist, Ian Rilen.

Buffalo and Chase were on tour in Perth in late October 1975 when they discovered New Zealand group, Dragon had been abandoned by their manager Wayne De Gruchy. Dragon's members could not afford return airfares to Sydney. Chase convinced the local promoter to fund Dragon and became their manager. Buffalo's bass guitarist Pete Wells formed Rose Tattoo in 1976, which Chase also managed and introduced Rilen so that Wells could move to slide guitar. Chase and Wells devised the band member's early image, "bright orange hair, no eyebrows, whiteface and black pants and tops." Chase and Rilen had both left Rose Tattoo by October 1977. Later that year, Chase was nominated as Manager of the Year at the Australian Rock Music Awards. Into the late 1970s he continued with Dragon, and took up with the Reels. He managed the latter group for three years, including relocating to London with them for an unsuccessful attempt to enter the United Kingdom's charts.

In the mid-1980s, he established Chase Records, which was distributed by CBS Records. The label issued the Delltones' album, Tickled Pink in 1984. It reached the top 100 on the Kent Music Report albums chart. The lead single, "Papa Oom Mow Mow", appeared on the related singles chart. Wells' domestic partner Patricia Anne Clements p.k.a. Lucy De Soto on lead vocals, piano and Hammond organ formed an eponymous band with Wells on slide guitar and his Rose Tattoo bandmate, Geordie Leach (p.k.a. Fast Eddie) on guitar and Ross Mercer on drums. They issued their debut album, Three Girls and a Sailor, via Chase Records in 1985. Chase also issued her second album, Help Me Rhonda, My Boyfriend's Back (1986).

The record label, rooArt was established in 1988 by Chase with C.M. Murphy (INXS' manager, Murphy Media Academy [MMA] CEO) and Justin Van Stom, who had previously worked for MMA. Initially their artists' releases were distribution by Polygram. For two years he was based in New York, "directing international activities for the dynamic Aus independent and travelling widely to implement those ambitious objectives", before returning to Sydney. Two of the label's early commercial successes were the Hummingbirds' loveBUZZ (1989), which reached the ARIA albums chart top 40, and Ratcat's Blind Love (1991), which peaked at number one. Chase left rooArt in the 1990s after an acrimonious falling out with Murphy. Chase joined existing label, Phantom Records with the Hummingbirds following. He became a director alongside his domestic partner, Kylie Greenlees and label-founder, Jules Normington.

Chase and Greenlees established MGM Distribution (Metropolitan Groove Merchants) in April 1998. They set it up to handle independent record labels and their artists. One of MGM Distribution's early signings was John Butler Trio, which independently issued their debut album, John Butler (December 1998). Another early act signed by Chase was Tim Freedman and his band the Whitlams. Chase had advised his clients to "set themselves up as companies, with chief members as CEOs. They handled as much of their business as possible, including their own record labels, publishing, and merchandising. When their records went platinum and more, they made more money than acts on major labels." In 2002 MGM continued their relationship with John Butler (of John Butler Trio) as a solo artist, who also co-owned Jarrah Records. MGM also signed Jararah labelmates, Joshua Cunningham, Donna Simpson and Vikki Thorn (née Simpson) (all three from the Waifs) to MGM by 2004. John Butler Trio's album Sunrise Over Sea (March 2004) became the first wholly independent – label (Jarrah) and distributor (MGM) - Australian album to debut at No. 1 on the ARIA albums chart.

By 2005 Chase was appointed to the Australian Recording Industry Association (ARIA) board as MGM had become the "most diverse distributor of Australian music, working with many indie artists including John Butler, The Waifs, and The Beautiful Girls" and Chase "has played an integral role in the evolution of Australian music". Also in 2005 Chase became one of 12 patrons of the Australian Music Prize, providing a cash prize for "the best contemporary music album" of a given year. At the 2016 ARIA Music Awards Chase received the Icon Award for his contributions to the Australian music industry. By February 2022, Chase had left the ARIA board and was replaced by Chris Maund. After seven years as a board member of charity, Support Act for entertainment artists, Chase resigned in December of that year. He received the Outstanding Achievement Award at the AIR Awards of 2026 in July.

== Personal life ==
Sebastian Chase and his then-wife Cheryle were expecting their first child in February 1979. Chase was divorced by 1988 and living in Woolloomooloo. Kylie Greenlees became his domestic partner in about 1990. Chase and Greenlees co-founded MGM Distribution and both were its co-CEOs. Greenlees died on 11 July 2015, aged 52.
