= Get It Right =

Get It Right or Getting It Right may refer to:

== Music ==
- Get It Right (album), by Aretha Franklin (1983)

=== Songs ===
- "Get It Right" (Aretha Franklin song) (1983)
- "Get It Right" (Glee cast song) (2010)
- "Get It Right", by Keyshia Cole from Woman to Woman (2012)
- "#GETITRIGHT", by Miley Cyrus from Bangerz (2013)
- "Get It Right", by Fantasia Barrino from Side Effects of You (2013)
- "Get It Right", by Teedra Moses from Cognac & Conversation (2015)
- "Get It Right", by Diplo (2017)
- "Get It Right", by Gary Walker (1966)
- "Get It Right", by Joe Fagin (1986)
- "Get It Right", by Juvenile from Tha G-Code (1999)
- "Get It Right", by K.Flay from Life as a Dog (2014)
- "Get It Right", by The Offspring from Baghdad (1991)
- "Get It Right", by Ralph Carter (1985)
- "Get It Right", by Raven from Stay Hard (1985)
- "Get It Right", by Rose Tattoo (1986)
- "Get It Right", by Russell Morris & The Rubes (1982)
- "Get It Right", by XO-IQ, featured in the television series Make It Pop
- ”Get It Right” by Backhouse Mike, featured in the television film Drake & Josh Go Hollywood (2006)
- "Gettin' It Right", by Alison Limerick (1992)

== Other media ==
- Getting It Right (film), a 1989 film directed by Randal Kleiser
- Getting It Right, a 2003 novel by William F. Buckley Jr.
