= Band of Talabene =

- Also known as: Willy & the Philtones
- Origin: Melbourne, Victoria, Australia
- Genres: Blues rock
- Years active: 1972–1973
- Label: Bootleg
- Past members: Tony Buettel; Phil Gaunt; Phil Manning; Tony Naylor; Gus Fenwick; Fran Kelly; Peter Curtain; Peter Roberts; Paul Wheeler; Dallas Royall; Steve Webb

Band of Talabene were an Australian blues rock band formed in April 1972 as Willy & the Philtones by Tony Buettel (ex-Bay City Union, Levi Smith's Clefs, Fraternity) on drums, Phil Gaunt (ex-Ida May Mack) on bass guitar, Phil Manning (ex-Bay City Union, Chain, Pilgrimage, Friends) on lead guitar and lead vocals, and Tony Naylor (ex-Ida May Mack) on guitar and vocals. According to Australian musicologist, Ian McFarlane, their name was both, "[a] homage to bands like Derek and the Dominoes (i.e. no-one called Willy in the band) and because it comprised two Phils and two Tonys." In July Gaunt was replaced on bass guitar by Gus Fenwick (ex-Pleazers) and they were renamed as Band of Talabene. Manning explained that his young daughter had dreamt of a band, Talabene, with pumpkins playing guitars.

Band of Talabene issued a single, "Herbert's Boogie", in November 1972 on the Bootleg label. Manning left to join Mighty Mouse in December. Naylor continued with a new line-up: Peter Curtain (ex-the Party Machine) on drums, Fran Kelly on bass guitar, and Peter Roberts (ex-The La De Da's, Band of Light) on guitar. This line-up issued a single, "Oh Darling", in April 1973. Naylor and Roberts were joined by Paul Wheeler (ex-Billy Thorpe and the Aztecs) on bass guitar and Dallas Royall on drums. Steve Webb (ex-Blackfeather, Wolfe, Duck, Tramp) replaced Royall on drums before the group disbanded in late 1973.

After leaving Band of Talabene, Buettel was a founding member of Band of Light, while in the 1980s he worked as a record producer. Manning used his Mighty Mouse bandmates to reconvene Chain in February 1973, but left again in July 1974 to work on solo projects, while periodically returning to Chain. Fenwick and Naylor were original members of Bootleg Family Band (1973–75), Naylor continued with the group, which became Avalanche, until 1978. Fenwick was in Ray Burton's Nightflyers in 1977. Royall joined Buster Brown in 1975 before going on to Rose Tattoo (1976–83). Roberts was in Kahvas Jute (renamed as Chariot) from May 1974.

== Members ==
- Tony Buettel – drums (1972)
- Phil Gaunt – bass guitar (1972)
- Phil Manning – lead guitar, lead vocals (1972)
- Tony Naylor – guitar, vocals (1972–73)
- Gus Fenwick – bass guitar (1972)
- Fran Kelly – bass guitar (1973)
- Peter Curtain – drums (1973)
- Peter Roberts – guitar (1973)
- Paul Wheeler – bass guitar (1973)
- Dallas Royall – drums (1973)
- Steve Webb – drums (1973)
