= Doomfoxx =

- Origin: Sydney
- Genres: Hard rock; blues rock
- Years active: 2004–2010
- Labels: Armageddon
- Past members: Stu McKie; Dave Thomas; Mick Cocks; Archie Read; Jase Burec; Stu Greenwood

Doomfoxx was an Australian hard rock band that existed between 2004 and 2010. During their most active and successful period, the band consisted of Stu McKie (vocals), Mick Cocks and Dave Thomas (guitar), Archi Read (bass) and Jase Burec (drums). The band was most successful in western Europe, particularly Germany, where they toured extensively. Doomfoxx released an EP and an album, both called Doomfoxx, and a second album that was never released.

== History ==
Singer Stu McKie and drummer Jase Burec had previously played together in a band called Circle that had formed in Sydney in 1990. In 1992 that band released a self-titled EP but the band ran its course and McKie moved to New York City and Burec relocated to Adelaide. During his time in New York, McKie met Australian guitarist Dave Thomas and in the early 2000s the pair returned to Sydney and formed Flame Boa with Burec and bassist Mark Gerber. Despite attracting significant attention and picking up management from Michael Browning, an early AC/DC manager, Flame Boa failed to take off.

In 2004, McKie, Thomas and Burec formed a new band called Doomfoxx, named after Iceberg Slim's final novel Doom Fox. Archi Read of Hell City Glamours replaced Gerber and after several rehearsals Rose Tattoo guitarist Mick Cocks joined the band.

== Career ==
Doomfoxx released their four-track self-titled EP in early 2005 and held down residencies at several inner-city Sydney venues. In May the band recorded a full-length album, also self-titled, for German label Armageddon and toured Europe with Quireboys and Rose Tattoo, making an appearance at Wacken Open Air. Several shows in the US including a Billboard showcase were followed by further European touring with Uli Jon Roth. In early 2006, Doomfoxx toured Europe and the UK with The Darkness; a follow-up tour with Michael Schenker Group was cancelled and the band returned to Australia to record a second album. A Night on the Lash was to be released in 2008 but was held off. Cocks left in the meantime and returned to Rose Tattoo and after a long string of temporary guitarists was replaced by Stu Greenwood. During the second half of 2008, Doomfoxx toured the US to support the release of the second album, but it was never released. The band continued to play shows up until the end of 2009.

Mick Cocks died of liver cancer on 22 December 2009 aged 54. Jase Burec died on February 15, 2023, after an extended battle with bowel cancer

== Band members ==
Former members

- Stu McKie – vocals, harmonica (2004–2010)
- Dave Thomas – guitar (2004–2010)
- Mick Cocks – guitar (2004–2007)
- Jase Burec – drums (2004–2010)
- Archie Read – bass (2004–2008)
- Stu Greenwood – guitar (2008-2010)

== Discography ==
=== Album ===
- Doomfoxx (2005)

=== EP ===
- Doomfoxx (2005)

=== Singles ===
- Piece of Me (2005)
- My Beautiful Friend (2005)
