= Rose Tattoo (Rose Tattoo album) =

Studio album by Rose Tattoo
- Released: November 1978
- Studio: Albert Studios, Sydney, Australia
- Genre: Hard rock; punk rock; blues rock
- Length: 36:48
- Label: Alberts, Repertoire
- Producer: Vanda & Young

Rose Tattoo chronology
Rose Tattoo (1978)	Assault & Battery (1981)

Singles from Rose Tattoo
- 1. "Bad Boy for Love" Released: October 1977; 2. "Rock 'n' Roll Outlaw" Released: September 1978; 3. "One of the Boys" Released: November 1978

Rock 'n' Roll Outlaw
- 1981 release

Professional ratings
Review scores
Source	Rating
AllMusic	4.5/5 stars

Rose Tattoo is the debut self-titled album by Australian hard rock band Rose Tattoo released in November 1978 on the Albert Productions label. It was produced by the famous Vanda & Young team who have worked with AC/DC, The Angels and Stevie Wright. The album was released as Rock 'n' Roll Outlaw (or Rock 'n' Roll Outlaws) in some markets. Eight bonus tracks were added for the 1990 CD edition for Repertoire Records.

== Background ==
Rose Tattoo formed in Sydney in 1976 by Pete Wells who wanted a tough slide guitar based band. They recorded their debut single, "Bad Boy for Love" with Angry Anderson on lead vocals, Mick Cocks on rhythm guitar, Ian Rilen on bass guitar, Dallas "Digger" Royall on drums and Peter Wells on slide guitar during mid-1977. Rilen, the song's writer departed to form punk rock group, X, prior to its release in October 1977. The single was produced by Vanda & Young (ex-The Easybeats, AC/DC's producers) and peaked at No. 19 on the Australian Kent Music Report Singles Chart. To cover Rilen's departure, Cocks switched to bass guitar, then Chris Turner (ex-Buffalo) was brought in.

Anderson's one-time bandmate, bass guitarist Geordie Leach was recruited to replace Turner and record their self-titled debut LP, Rose Tattoo, which reached the top 40 on the Australian Kent Music Report Albums Chart in November 1978. The album, produced by Vanda & Young, was released in some markets as Rock N' Roll Outlaw from their second Australian single, "Rock N' Roll Outlaw" which did not reach the top 50. Leach left the band in May 1979 to be replaced in October by guitarist Lobby Loyde (Purple Hearts, Wild Cherries). The band toured the United States, recorded an unreleased album in Los Angeles, and then toured Europe (including UK), but by September Loyde had left and Leach had returned.

Early in 1981, "Rock n' Roll Outlaw" started to chart in Europe, peaking at No. 2 in France, No. 5 in Germany and No. 60 in UK. The line up of Anderson, Cocks, Leach, Royall and Wells toured Europe from April. Three years after their debut the band issued the follow-up album, Assault & Battery in September, which reached the top 30 in Australia. Both Rock N' Roll Outlaw and Assault & Battery peaked at No. 1 on the UK heavy metal albums chart. Eight bonus tracks were added for the 1990 CD edition for Repertoire Records.

== Legacy ==
The song "Nice Boys" was covered by Guns N' Roses in 1986 on their Live ?!*@ Like a Suicide EP and it was later re-released on their 1988 EP G N' R Lies. Axl Rose and Izzy Stradlin have both claimed that Rose Tattoo changed their lives and confirmed to them that their own future was in rock 'n' roll. "Nice Boys" was also covered by punk band Nashville Pussy on their 1998 debut EP Eat More Pussy. In 1987, the song "Rock & Roll Outlaw" was covered by American band Keel for the soundtrack of the movie Dudes. It has also been covered by Nashville Pussy on their High as Hell album, L.A. Guns on their Rips the Covers Off album and founding member Pete Wells Also covered it on his debut solo record Everything You Like Tries to Kill You. American singer Helen Schneider also released a version of the song, retitled "Rock & Roll Gypsy", which went all the way to number one on the Swiss singles charts and made it to number six in Germany in 1981. In October 2010, Rose Tattoo (1978) was listed in the book, 100 Best Australian Albums.

== Track listing ==
All tracks written by members of Rose Tattoo as shown.

1. "Rock 'n' Roll Outlaw" (Gary Anderson, Michael Cocks, Gordon Leach, Dallas Royall, Peter Wells) – 3:24
2. "Nice Boys" (Leach, Anderson, Royall, Wells, Cocks) – 2:55
3. "The Butcher and Fast Eddy" (Leach, Anderson, Royall, Wells, Cocks) – 6:33
4. "One of the Boys" (Leach, Anderson, Royall, Wells, Cocks) – 3:12
5. "Remedy" (Leach, Anderson, Cocks, Royall, Wells) – 3:03
6. "Bad Boy for Love" (Ian Rilen) – 3:08
7. "T.V." (Anderson, Leach, Royall, Wells, Cocks) – 2:02
8. "Stuck on You" (Leach, Royall, Anderson, Wells, Cocks) – 3:58
9. "Tramp" (Anderson, Leach, Royall, Wells, Cocks) – 2:40
10. "Astra Wally" (Wells, Rilen, Cocks, Anderson, Royall) – 5:58

1990 Repertoire Records re-release bonus tracks

1. "Never Too Loud" (Anderson, Leach) – 3:46
2. "I Had You First" (Anderson, Wells) – 2:36
3. "Fightin' Sons" (Anderson, Wells) – 3:09
4. "Snow Queen" (Ian Rilen) – 4:20
5. "Rock 'n' Roll Outlaw" (live) (Anderson, Cocks, Leach, Royall, Wells) – 3:33
6. "Bad Boy for Love" (live) (Ian Rilen) – 5:39
7. "Rock 'n' Roll Is King" (live) (Cocks, Anderson) – 4:26
8. "Suicide City" (live) (Anderson, Cocks) – 5:20

== Personnel ==
Rose Tattoo members

- Angry Anderson – lead vocals
- Peter Wells – slide guitar, vocals
- Mick Cocks – lead guitar, rhythm guitar
- Geordie Leach – bass guitar (tracks 1–5, 7–9, 11–13, 15–18)
- Ian Rilen – bass guitar (tracks 6, 10, 14)
- Dallas "Digger" Royall – drums

Production

- Harry Vanda – producer
- George Young – producer

== Charts ==
Chart (1978–1979)	Peak position
Australian Albums (Kent Music Report)	40
