= Bound for Glory (song) =

Song by Angry Anderson

Single by Angry Anderson

from the album Blood from Stone
- Released: August 1990 (Aus); 1992 (UK)
- Recorded: 1989
- Length: 3:59
- Label: Mushroom Records
- Songwriters: Angry Anderson, Michael de Luca
- Producer: Mike Slamer

Angry Anderson singles chronology
"Suddenly" (1987)	"Bound for Glory" (1990)	"Heaven" (1990)

"Bound For Glory" is a song by Australian singer Angry Anderson. The song was released in August 1990 as the lead single from Anderson's studio album Blood from Stone. It peaked at number 11 on the ARIA Charts.

The music video, shot in black and white and directed by Kriv Stenders, features Anderson and his band performing the song in a warehouse intercut with footage of boxer Anthony Mundine and wheelchair basketball player Donna Ritchie training. Also prominently featured in the video is tattooist Tony Cohen, who is shown riding a motorcycle and giving Anderson a tattoo.

== Sporting anthem ==
The song was adopted as an unofficial anthem of the AFL during the 1991 season and was performed during half-time at the 1991 AFL Grand Final at Waverley Park between Hawthorn and West Coast. Anderson performed the song after jumping out of a vehicle that resembled the Batmobile, and while he performed it live, he notably struggled vocally during the performance, which fellow guest Robert de Castella blamed on the venue's poor acoustics. Anderson himself claimed that he could not hear himself over the engine noise of the "Batmobile". Anderson's performance has since been the subject of derision, and footage of the performance was featured in a 2008 satirical Carlton & United Breweries television advertisement, with a caption stating "Carlton Draught. Proud supporter of footy since 1877 (Except for 1991)".

The song was later featured on Australian TV show 20 to One's Greatest Sporting Anthems episode. The song was also used as the theme music for the SYN radio program Bound for Glory.

== Charts ==
Chart (1990)	Peak position
Australia (ARIA)	11

=== Year-end charts ===
(1990)	Position
Australia (ARIA)	73
