= Mick Cocks =

Australian guitarist (1955–2009)

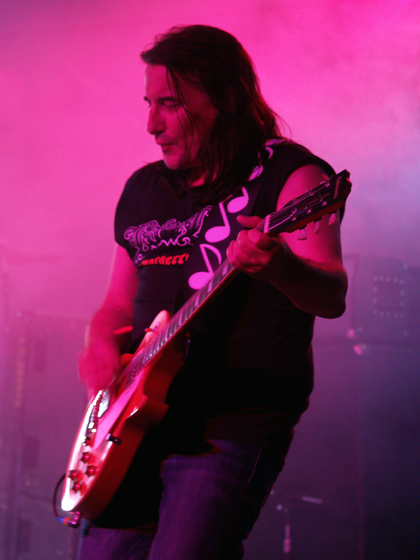
- Mick Cocks performing with Rose Tattoo at the Meredith Festival in December 2006.

Background information
- Born: Michael Thomas Cocks; 11 January 1955; Alphington, Victoria, Australia
- Died: 22 December 2009 (aged 54) Sydney, New South Wales, Australia
- Genre: Rock
- Occupation: Musician
- Instruments: Guitar, bass guitar
- Years active: 1976–2009
- Formerly of: Rose Tattoo, Heaven, The Headhunters, Illustrated Men, Doomfoxx, Ted Mulry Gang

Michael Thomas Cocks (11 January 1955 – 22 December 2009) was an Australian musician, most noted for his guitar and songwriting work with Rose Tattoo. His original sound and style heavily influenced Guns N' Roses, who recorded a cover of the Rose Tattoo song "Nice Boys". He was also a member of Heaven, The Headhunters, Illustrated Men, Doomfoxx, Pete Wells' Heart Attack, and the Ted Mulry Gang. On 16 August 2006, Rose Tattoo were inducted into the Australian Recording Industry Association (ARIA) Hall of Fame.

In April 2009, Cocks was diagnosed with liver cancer and died from the disease eight months later, on 22 December 2009. He was the fifth member of Rose Tattoo to die of cancer, preceded by Dallas Royall (1991), Peter Wells (2006), Ian Rilen (2006), and Lobby Loyde (2007).

== Biography ==
Michael Thomas "Mick" Cocks was born on 11 January 1955. Rose Tattoo formed in 1976 in Sydney with a line-up of Leigh Johnston on rhythm guitar, Tony Lake on lead vocals, Michael Vandersluys on drums and Peter Wells (ex-Buffalo) on slide guitar. Ian Rilen from Band of Light joined on bass guitar. Cocks soon joined the group and replaced Johnston on rhythm guitar. Lake and Vandersluys were substituted by former Buster Brown members Angry Anderson on vocals and Dallas "Digger" Royall on drums respectively. Rose Tattoo made their public debut on New Year's Eve at the rock club Chequers.

The band's debut single "Bad Boy for Love" peaked at No. 19 on the Australian Kent Music Report Singles Chart in 1977. When Rilen left the group Cocks switched to bass guitar then Chris Turner (ex-Buffalo) was brought and, in turn, was replaced by Geordie Leach (ex-Buster Brown). This line-up recorded their debut album, Rose Tattoo which reached the top 40 on the Australian Kent Music Report Albums Chart in November 1978. The group was briefly banned from appearing on Australian TV pop TV show, Countdown after Anderson kissed Cocks during their performance of "Bad Boy for Love".

Early in 1981 the band's single, "Rock N' Roll Outlaw" started to chart in Europe, peaking at No. 2 in France, No. 5 in Germany and No. 60 in UK. The line up of Anderson, Cocks, Leach, Royall and Wells toured Europe from April. Three years after their debut album the band issued the follow-up album, Assault and Battery in September, which reached the top 30 in Australia. Both Rock N' Roll Outlaw and Assault and Battery peaked at No. 1 on the UK heavy metal albums chart. In 1980 Cocks was also a founding member of The Headhunters – an ad hoc collection of R&B musicians – initially with Todd Hunter on bass guitar and his brother Marc on vocals (both from Dragon); John Watson on drums and Kevin Borich on lead guitar (both Kevin Borich Express). A later line-up included Cocks with Dave Tice (ex-Buffalo) on vocals and Mark Evans (ex-AC/DC, Finch) on guitar. In the mid-1990s Cocks, Evans and Tice performed as an acoustic blues trio in Sydney pubs and clubs. In late 1981, Rose Tattoo, with Cocks, returned to Australia from a tour of Europe and began work on their third album, Scarred for Life. In 1982, before recording commenced, Cocks had left to join Heaven and was replaced by Robin Riley on guitar.

In 1980 Heaven was a heavy metal band formed in Sydney, they had issued a debut album, Twilight of Mischief. In May 1982 Cocks replaced John Haese on guitar and the group toured the United States' West Coast supporting Mötley Crüe and Dio. They relocated to Los Angeles and recorded a second album for RCA during 1983, Where Angels Fear to Tread, which spawned the single, "Rock School". In September 1983 Cocks "had been ousted from Heaven" to be replaced by Evans. In November 1984, Cocks re-joined his ex-Rose Tattoo bandmates, Rilen, Leach, Royall and Wells to form Illustrated Men – with Rilen handling lead vocals – which toured Australia. The group "played loud, barnstorming rock'n'roll in the Rose Tattoo tradition. Most of the songs in the band's repertoire had been written by Rilen". By mid-1985 Illustrated Men had disbanded.

From 1990, Anderson attempted to reform Rose Tattoo with Cocks but the death of Royall in 1991 of cancer stalled the process. In 1993, Rose Tattoo reunited, with Cocks and new drummer Paul DeMarco, to support Guns N' Roses on the Australian leg of their Use Your Illusion Tour. However, the reunion was short-lived and the band's members returned to other projects. Cocks had been a member of Pete Wells Heart Attack (1995) and the Ted Mulry Gang. Rose Tattoo reconvened in 1998 as Cocks, Anderson, Wells, Rilen and DeMarco, and undertook an Australian tour. The following year Rilen was replaced by Leach again but Cocks left soon after. In 2003, Cocks rejoined Rose Tattoo to write tracks with Anderson which were recorded for a future album, Blood Brothers. Sessions were disrupted by Wells' illness and eventual death of prostate cancer on 27 March 2006, four years after his initial diagnosis. At this time Cocks was also a member of Doomfoxx.

On 16 August 2006, Rose Tattoo were inducted into the Australian Recording Industry Association (ARIA) Hall of Fame. On 30 October 2006, Rilen died from bladder cancer two months after his appearance at the Hall of Fame ceremony. On 21 April 2007, Lobby Loyde, briefly a bass guitarist for Rose Tattoo, died of lung cancer.

== Death ==
In April 2009, Cocks was diagnosed with liver cancer, manager Steve White stated, "Mick ... is now under the advice of the very best doctors in Sydney. Treatment plans are underway and [he] is in good spirits and ready for a fight".

In July, a benefit concert with Rose Tattoo, Jimmy Barnes, You Am I, Ian Moss and The Screaming Jets played at the Enmore Theatre in Sydney to raise money for Cocks. Mick Cocks died from liver cancer on 22 December 2009, aged 54. He was the fifth member of Rose Tattoo to die of cancer and was survived by his partner, Mary.

== Discography ==
=== Albums ===
Rose Tattoo

- Rose Tattoo – (1978, Albert Productions)
- Assault & Battery – (1981, Albert Productions)
- Blood Brothers – (2007)

Heaven

- Bent – (1982)
- Where Angels Fear to Tread – (1983)

Doomfoxx

- Doomfoxx (2005)

=== Singles ===
Rose Tattoo

- "Bad Boy for Love" (1977)
- "Rock 'N' Roll Outlaw" (1978)
- "One of the Boys" (1978)
- "Realise Legalise" (1980)
- "Rock 'N' Roll Is King" (1981)
- "Out of This Place" (1981)

Heaven

- "Rock School"(1983)

The Headhunters

- "I Believe I'm Love"(1986)
