= Blood from Stone =

1990 album by Angry Anderson

Studio album by Angry
- Released: September 1990
- Length: 48:54
- Label: Mushroom Records
- Producer: Mike Slamer

Angry chronology
Beats from a Single Drum (1987)	Blood from Stone (1990)

Singles from Blood from Stone
- 1. "Bound for Glory" Released: August 1990; 2. "Heaven" Released: 1990

Blood from Stone is the second and final studio album by Australian hard rock singer Angry Anderson, credited as Angry. The album was released in September 1990 a and peaked at number 35 on the ARIA Charts.

== Reception ==
Steve Mascara gave the album 4/5 and said "There's songs about glory, motorbikes, girls, bars and fights, tempered with the odd social conscience ditty, of course."

== Track listing ==
Blood from Stone track listing
No.	Title	Writer(s)	Length
1.	"Bound for Glory"	Angry Anderson, Michael de Luca	3:59
2.	"Wild Boys"	Anderson, Mike Slamer	3:46
3.	"Heaven"	Anderson, Slamer	4:34
4.	"Stone Cold"	Anderson, Slamer	5:16
5.	"Fire and Water"	Anderson, Slamer	6:41
6.	"Born Survivor"	Slamer	3:50
7.	"Motorbike Song"	Anderson, Beau Hill	4:57
8.	"Love from Ashes"	Anderson, de luca	4:41
9.	"Born to Be Wild"	Mars Bonfire	3:46
10.	"Bad Days"	Anderson, Slamer	7:20

== Charts ==
Chart performance for Blood from Stone
Chart (1990)	Peak position
Australian Albums (ARIA)	35
