= Ronnie Simmons =

Australian guitarist

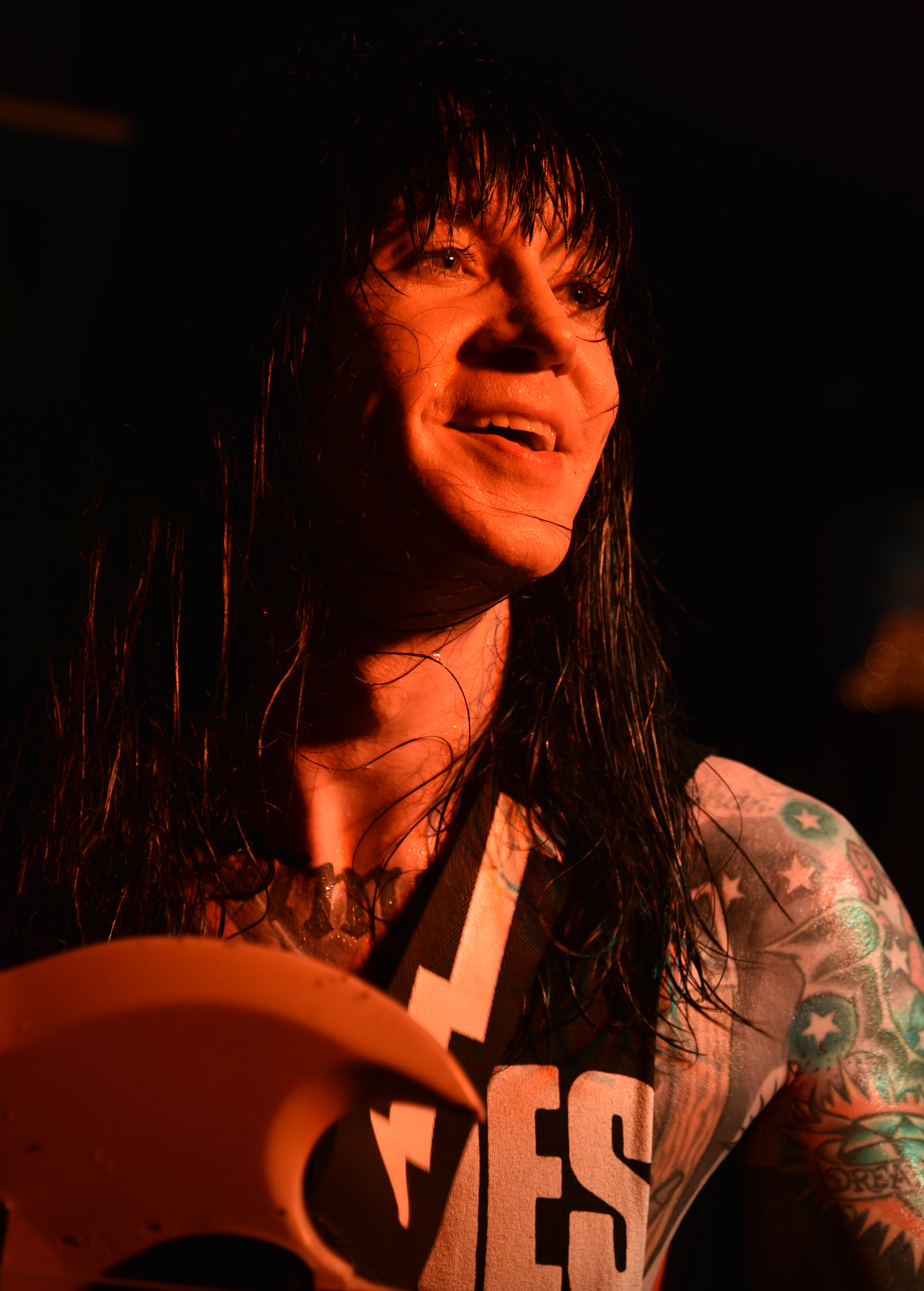
- Simmons in 2022

Background information
- Born: August 26, 1988 (age 38)
- Genres: Hard rock, glam metal, punk rock
- Occupation: Musician
- Instrument: Guitar
- Years active: 2004–present

Ronnie Simmons (born 26 August 1988) is an Australian guitarist and songwriter, best known as a member of Australian hard rock band Rose Tattoo. He has also been a member of Richie Ramone's band and American rock band Faster Pussycat. He is the founder of Ronnie Simmons and The Redback Spiders.

== Career ==
Simmons began playing in the pubs of Sydney at 15 and went on to tour Australia supporting bands like The Screaming Jets and Ace Frehley. Relocating to Los Angeles in 2014 he worked as a touring hired gun guitarist, he recorded an album with Motochrist in 2015 before joining Richie Ramone's band in 2016. In 2022, he joined Faster Pussycat, touring with the band in the United States and Australia.

Following Faster Pussycat's Australian tour in early 2023, he joined Rose Tattoo. He toured internationally with the band until the death of frontman Angry Anderson in 2026.

== Discography ==
- Rose Tattoo – Hard Road (single) (2025)
- Ronnie Simmons and the Redback Spiders – Alone With You (single) (2024)
- Faster Pussycat – Like a Ghost/Pirate Love (single) (2023)
- Richie Ramone – Live To Tell (2023)
- The Screaming Jets – Gotcha Covered (2017)
- Motochrist – Chrome (2015)
