= Beats from a Single Drum =

1986 album by Rose Tattoo

Studio album by Rose Tattoo
- Released: November 1986
- Studios: Rhinoceros Studios, Australia
- Label: Mushroom Records
- Producer: Kevin Beamish

Rose Tattoo albums chronology
A Decade of Rock (1986)	Beats from a Single Drum (1986)	Their Greatest Hits (1987)

Singles from Beats from a Single Drum
- 1. "Calling" Released: September 1986; 2. "Get It Right" Released: December 1986; 3. "Falling" Released: March 1987

Beats from a Single Drum

Studio album by Angry Anderson
- Released: 1987
- Label: Mushroom Records

Angry Anderson chronology
Beats from a Single Drum (1987)	Blood from Stone (1990)

Singles from Beats from a Single Drum
- 1. "Suddenly" Released: July 1987

Beats from a Single Drum is the fifth studio album by Australian hard rock band Rose Tattoo. It was released in November 1986 and peaked at number 35 on the Kent Music Report.

Following the success of "Suddenly", and the group splitting, the album was re-released in 1988 as band member Angry Anderson's debut album.

== Track listing ==
Beats from a Single Drum track listing
No.	Title	Writer(s)	Length
1.	"Calling"	Angry Anderson, John Meyer	4:33
2.	"Frightened Kid"	Anderson, Scott Johnston, Meyer	3:11
3.	"Suddenly"	Anderson, Kevin Beamish, Andy Cichon	4:08
4.	"Runaway"	Anderson, Cichon	3:58
5.	"Winnie Mandela"	Anderson, Beamish, Cichon, Meyer	4:50
6.	"Get It Right"	Anderson, Cichon	3:30
7.	"Say Goodbye"	Anderson, Cichon	4:09
8.	"Falling"	Anderson, Beamish, Cichon	4:20
9.	"Clear and Simple"	Anderson, Cichon	3:38
10.	"Michael O'Reilly"	Anderson, Meyer	3:38

== Personnel ==
- Angry Anderson – lead vocals
- Scott Johnston – drums, backing vocals
- Tim Gaze – slide guitar, guitar
- Andy Cichon – bass guitar, piano, keyboards

== Charts ==
Chart performance for Beats from a Single Drum
Chart (1986–1987)	Peak position
Australian Albums (Kent Music Report)	35
