= Scarred for Life (Rose Tattoo album) =

Studio album by Rose Tattoo
- Released: October 1982
- Studio: Albert Studios, Sydney, Australia
- Genre: Hard rock, blues rock
- Length: 39:02
- Label: Albert Productions
- Producer: Vanda & Young

Rose Tattoo chronology
Assault & Battery (1981)	Scarred for Life (1982)	Southern Stars (1984)

Singles from Scarred for Life
- 1. "We Can't Be Beaten" Released: October 1982; 2. "Branded" Released: February 1983; 3. "It's Gonna Work Itself Out" Released: 1983

Scarred For Life is the third studio album by Australian hard rock band Rose Tattoo. The album was released in October 1982 and peaked at number 11 on the Kent Music Report. Scarred for Life launched Rose Tattoo to international success with the rock anthem "We Can't Be Beaten".

"We Can't Be Beaten" was covered by Swiss thrash metal act Drifter on their 1989 album Nowhere to Hide and features a guest appearance by Motörhead guitarist Phil Campbell.

== Track listing ==
1. "Scarred for Life" (Anderson, Riley, Royall) – 3:50
2. "We Can't Be Beaten" (Anderson, Riley) – 3:05
3. "Juice on the Loose" (Anderson, Wells) – 3:57
4. "Who's Got the Cash" (Anderson, Wells) – 3:57
5. "Branded" (Anderson, Riley) – 6:44
6. "Texas" (Anderson, Wells) – 3:09
7. "It's Gonna Work Itself Out" (Anderson, Riley) – 3:58
8. "Sydney Girls" (Anderson, Wells) – 3:31
9. "Dead Set" (Anderson, Leach) – 3:15
10. "Revenge" (Anderson, Wells) – 3:36

== Personnel ==
- Angry Anderson – lead vocals
- Peter Wells – slide guitar and vocals
- Rob Riley – lead and rhythm guitar
- Geordie Leach – bass
- Dallas "Digger" Royall – drums
- Sam Horsburgh Jnr. – engineer
- Col Freeman – mixdown engineer

== Charts ==
Chart performance for Scarred for Life
Chart (1982–1983)	Peak position
Australian Albums (Kent Music Report)	11
