= Southern Stars (album) =

Studio album by Rose Tattoo
- Released: 10 October 1984
- Recorded: 1984
- Studio: Albert, Sydney, Australia
- Genre: Hard rock; blues rock
- Length: 40:21
- Label: Albert Productions
- Producer: Vanda & Young

Rose Tattoo chronology
Scarred for Life (1982)	Southern Stars (1984)	A Decade of Rock (1986)

Singles from Southern Stars
- 1. "I Wish" Released: August 1984; 2. "Freedom's Flame" Released: October 1984; 3. "No Secrets" Released: February 1985

Southern Stars is the fourth studio album by Australian hard rock band Rose Tattoo. The album was recorded with Angry Anderson on lead vocals, Geordie Leach on bass guitar and new members Greg Jordan on slide and lead guitars, John Meyer on guitar and Scott Johnston on drums. It peaked at No. 30 on the Kent Music Report albums chart. Anderson explained the band's high turn-over rate, "people who got the chop were those who just couldn't cut it musically... [they] thought that a 30-day tour was a 30-day party. Some of them just could not be told... If you want to make it overseas you have to approach it intelligently and professionally".

Southern Stars, with production by Vanda & Young, had the band moving in a more AOR style, but retaining their hard rock, boogie blues style. AllMusic's reviewer rated it at two-and-a-half stars out-of-five. A writer for The Canberra Times observed, "[it's] imbued with a sense of awareness that may surprise more than a few followers... [while] still holding fast to the pure principles of 'rock 'n roll'." Its lead single "I Wish" (August 1984), reached No. 32 on the Kent Music Report singles chart. The two follow-up singles, "Freedom's Flame" (October) and "No Secrets" (February 1985), did not appear in the top 100. Rose Tattoo toured Australia in support of the album and it was well received, but by late 1985, Anderson put the band into a year-long hiatus due to his acting commitments. It was the last Rose Tattoo album, which was produced by Harry Vanda and George Young.

Anderson said, "It's all about the spirit of the Eureka Stockade. The whole album is patriotic – not just to Australia, but to the whole human race. It's also very moralistic – all our albums have been but nobody's taken the time to listen."

== Track listing ==
All tracks are written by Gary Stephen Anderson (p.k.a. Angry Anderson) and John Frederick Christian Meyer, unless otherwise noted

Southern Stars track listing
No.	Title	Length
1.	"Southern Stars" (Greg Neil Jordan, Anderson, Meyer)	4:24
2.	"Let Us Live" (Jordan, Anderson, Meyer)	3:14
3.	"Freedom's Flame"	5:37
4.	"I Wish"	4:25
5.	"Saturday's Rage" (Anderson, Jordan)	3:31
6.	"Death or Glory" (Jordan, Anderson)	3:02
7.	"The Pirate Song" (Gordon "Geordie" Leach, Anderson)	4:13
8.	"You've Been Told"	4:40
9.	"No Secrets"	3:59
10.	"The Radio Said Rock 'n' Roll Is Dead"	3:21
Total length:		40:21

== Personnel ==
- Angry Anderson – lead vocals
- Geordie Leach – bass guitar
- Greg Jordan – lead guitar, slide guitar
- John Meyer – guitar
- Scott Johnston – drums

== Charts ==
Chart performance for Scarred for Life
Chart (1984–1985)	Peak position
Australian Albums (Kent Music Report)	30
