= Buster Brown (Australian band) =

Australian rock band

- Origin: Melbourne, Victoria, Australia
- Genre: Rock
- Years active: 1973–1975
- Labels: Mushroom, Aztec
- Past members: see members list below

Buster Brown were an Australian rock band, which featured vocalist Angry Anderson and drummer Phil Rudd, that was formed in Melbourne in 1973. Their sound was hard rock mixed with blues rock influences. Their first album, Something to Say was produced by Lobby Loyde and released in 1974. Rudd left to join an early version of AC/DC while Anderson continued with new line-ups and eventually disbanded the group in November 1975. Anderson joined Rose Tattoo which later included former Buster Brown bandmates, Geordie Leach on bass guitar and Dallas "Digger" Royall on drums.

== History ==
Buster Brown was formed in Melbourne in 1973 with Gary 'Angry' Anderson on lead vocals (ex-Peace Power and Purity), John Moon on guitar, Paul Grant on guitar, Phil Rudd on drums, Ian Ryan on bass guitar (ex-Ash, Chook) and Chris Wilson on keyboards. They enjoyed local notoriety and played at the 1974 Sunbury Festival in January. Later that year, Mushroom Records released a Various Artists live album, Highlights of Sunbury '74 Part 1 which included the group's tracks "Roll Over Beethoven" and "Buster Brown". Early in the year, Geordie Leach replaced Ryan on bass guitar. Along with Coloured Balls, Billy Thorpe, Madder Lake and Chain, they were supported by suburban-based sharpie gangs.

The band's first single, "Buster Brown" was issued in July 1974 by Mushroom Records. Veteran rocker, Lobby Loyde (lead guitarist of Coloured Balls) produced their debut album, Something to Say which was also released in December but by the end of the year the group had split with Rudd joining an early version of AC/DC. A second single, "Something to Say" was subsequently released in January 1975. From April to June 1975 the line-up resumed as Anderson, Leach and Wilson with Dennis Millar on guitar and Trevor Young on drums (ex-Coloured Balls). In July, Anderson formed a third version of the band with Ken Firth on bass guitar (ex-Tully), Billy Miller on guitar and vocals, Dave Springfield on guitar and drummer Dallas "Digger" Royal (ex-Band of Talabene).

The group disbanded in November 1975, Anderson initially tried to form a band with Loyde. Firth, Miller and Springfield regrouped as The Ferrets. In late 1976 Anderson joined Sydney-based rockers Rose Tattoo which later included former Buster Brown bandmates, Geordie Leach on bass guitar and Dallas 'Digger' Royall on drums. According to Australian rock music historian Ian McFarlane, Buster Brown were "one of the most notorious streetlevel/ boogie outfits of its day ... [they] built up a solid following around the pubs, and among the skinheads on the suburban dance circuit". In 2005, Aztec Music remastered Something to Say on CD with six bonus tracks.

In 2025 the band re-recorded Something to Say as Something To Say 2025 Redux due to the band members believing the original album did not truly represent the band's music. It was released through Laneway Records as digital only release via Spotify.

== Members ==
- Angry Anderson – vocals (1973–1975)
- Ken Firth – bass guitar (1975)
- Paul Grant – guitar (1973–1974)
- Geordie Leach – bass guitar (1973–1975)
- Tony Lunt – drums (1974)
- Dennis Millar – guitar (1975)
- Billy Miller – guitar, vocals (1975)
- John Moon – guitar (1973–1974)
- Dallas Royall – drums (1975)
- Phil Rudd – drums (1973–1974)
- Ian Ryan – bass guitar (1973)
- Dave Springfield – guitar (1975)
- Chris Wilson – keyboards (1973–1975)
- Trevor Young – drums (1975)

== Discography ==
=== Albums ===
- Something to Say – Mushroom/Festival (L-35355) (December 1974)
- Something to Say - 2025 Redux - Laneway Records (July 2025)

Track listing

All tracks are written by Gary 'Angry' Anderson, Paul Grant, Geordie Leach, John Moon, Phillip Rudzevecuis (a.k.a. Phil Rudd), and Chris Wilson, (Note: Songwriting credits per track from Australasian Performing Right Association (APRA).) unless otherwise indicated

| No. | Title | Writer(s) | Length |
|---|---|---|---|
| 1. | "Rock and Roll Lady" | | 4:40 |
| 2. | "Let Me In" | | 3:51 |
| 3. | "Buster Brown" | | 4:22 |
| 4. | "Roll Over Beethoven" | Chuck Berry | 4:47 |
| 5. | "Young Spunk" | | 6:08 |
| 6. | "Apprentice" | | 5:37 |
| 7. | "Something to Say" | | 5:27 |
| Total length: | | | 35:52 |

=== Singles ===
- "Buster Brown"/"Rock and Roll Lady" – Mushroom (K-5558) (July 1974)
- "Something to Say"/"Let Me In" – Mushroom (K-5731) (January 1975)
