= Assault & Battery (Rose Tattoo album) =

Studio album by Rose Tattoo
- Released: September 1981
- Recorded: Albert Studios, Sydney, Australia
- Genre: Hard rock; blues rock; pop metal
- Label: Albert Productions; WEA Records (Europe)
- Producer: Vanda & Young

Rose Tattoo chronology
Rose Tattoo (1978)	Assault & Battery (1981)	Scarred for Life (1982)

Singles from Assault & Battery
- 1. "Rock 'n' Roll Is King" Released: August 1981; 2. "Assault & Battery" Released: 1981 (UK only); 3. "Out of This Place" Released: 19 Feb 1982

Professional ratings
Review scores
Source	Rating
Record Mirror	5/5 stars

Assault & Battery is the second studio album by Australian hard rock band Rose Tattoo, released in September 1981. It peaked at number 27 on the Kent Music Report.

== Track listing ==
1. "Out of This Place" (Anderson, Cocks)
2. "All the Lessons" (Anderson, Cocks)
3. "Let It Go" (Anderson, Cocks)
4. "Assault & Battery" (Anderson, Cocks)
5. "Magnum Maid" (Anderson, Wells)
6. "Rock 'n' Roll Is King" (Anderson, Cocks)
7. "Manzil Madness" (Anderson, Wells)
8. "Chinese Dunkirk" (Anderson, Leach, Cocks, Royall, Wells)
9. "Sidewalk Sally" (Anderson, Cocks)
10. "Suicide City" (Anderson, Cocks)

== Personnel ==
- Angry Anderson – lead vocals
- Peter Wells – slide guitar and vocals
- Mick Cocks – lead and rhythm guitar
- Geordie Leach – bass guitar
- Dallas "Digger" Royall – drums
- Colin Freeman – engineer
- Sam Horsburgh – mixdown engineer

== Charts ==
Chart (1981–1982)	Peak position
Australian Albums (Kent Music Report)	27
UK Albums (OCC)	40
