= Dallas Royall =

Australian musician

- Royall drumming for Rose Tattoo's "Rock 'n' Roll Outlaw" on Countdown in October 1978

Background information
- Also known as: Digger Royall
- Born: Dallas Leslie Royall; July 1949; Melbourne, Victoria, Australia
- Died: 1991 (aged 41–42)
- Genre: Hard rock
- Occupation: Musician
- Instrument: Drums
- Years active: 1969–1989

Dallas Leslie "Digger" Royall (1949 – 1991) was an Australian hard rock drummer. He was a member of Band of Talabene (1973), Buster Brown (1975) and Rose Tattoo (1976–1983). He died of an unspecified cancer in 1991 while being treated for heroin and alcohol addictions.

== Biography ==
Royall was born in July 1949, his father was a guitarist. According to Rose Tattoo's official website's biography, from October 1982, "[he is] a former Army chopper pilot who's spent the past fifteen years thrashing the kit & the bottle." He started his professional career upon turning 21 and his early groups were swing bands. In 1969, he joined Reeb Revol in Canberra on drums alongside Ian "Gunther" Gorman on guitar, Graham Patrick on saxophone, Paul Reynolds on bass guitar and vocals, Ron Shepherd on vocals and Peter Smith on trumpet. The following year, he was a member of Salty Dog with Gorman on guitar and vocals, Les Catterall on lead vocals, Scotty Ingram on guitar and vocals and Chris Willing on bass guitar.

In January 1973, he joined a pop rock group, McAskill, on drums, which were formed in Sydney by Barrie "The Bear" McAskill on vocals, Michael Barnes on guitar, Steve Doran on organ and Doug Stirling on bass guitar. Soon Alvin Tutin replaced Barnes on guitar and Eddy McDonald took over from Stirling on bass guitar. That group relocated to Melbourne where Royall continued with McAskill and they were joined by Ian Mawson on keyboards (ex-Company Caine), Warren Ward on bass guitar (ex-the Flying Circus, Blackfeather) and Lindsay Wells on guitar (ex-Healing Force, Chain, Blackfeather). Also in that year, Royall was briefly the drummer for Melbourne-based blues rockers, Band of Talabene.

In July 1975, he joined hard rock group, Buster Brown, alongside Angry Anderson on lead vocals, Ken Firth on bass guitar (ex-Tully), Billy Miller on guitar and vocals, and Dave Springfield on guitar. Buster Brown disbanded in November of that year, when Firth, Miller and Springfield became members of The Ferrets.

Royall and Anderson relocated to Sydney and joined fellow hard rockers, Rose Tattoo, in 1976. He was recorded on their first three studio albums, Rose Tattoo (October 1978), Assault & Battery (September 1981) and Scarred for Life (October 1982). Royall was also credited as co-composer for much of the group's first album including the early singles, "Rock 'n' Roll Outlaw" (September 1978) and "One of the Boys" (November). His drumming was broadcast on Countdown on "Rock 'n' Roll Outlaw" in October 1978. He left the group in 1983.

Royall formed Illustrated Men in November 1984 with former Rose Tattoo band members, Mick Cocks on guitar (ex-Heaven by then), Gordie Leach on bass guitar, Ian Rilen on lead vocals (X), and Pete Wells on lead guitar. This group "played loud, barnstorming rock'n'roll" but were "designed to be a short-term touring venture". They toured into 1985 performing material largely written by Rilen before disbanding. He joined Chris Turner's backing band (ex-Buffalo band mate of Wells) and was recorded on the album, Exile (1990).

Dallas Leslie Royall died of an unspecified cancer in 1991 while being treated for heroin and alcohol addictions. Anderson wanted to reform Rose Tattoo in the early 1990s and told Nick Murphy of the Maitland Mercury, in March 2011, "I was in Los Angeles in 1989 recording an album which the 'Bound for Glory' single came off... there was still this great following for the band. I rang up the other members and said 'Let's reform. We've been apart for three years or more.'... But, of course, that was the year that our original drummer "Digger" Royall kicked his heroin habit. While he was recovering on methadone, cancer exploded through his body, quite sadly. That was the irony of it, because the cancer had been suppressed by the heroin addiction. Within months he was dead. That shook the band so badly on a personal level, because we had been so enthusiastic to reform."

At the ARIA Music Awards of 2006 in August, Rose Tattoo were inducted into the Hall of Fame at the Regent Hotel, Melbourne. In February 2017 Rose Tattoo issued a live album, Tatts – Live in Brunswick, which features material from a 1982 concert with Royall on drums. Dennis Jarman of PlanetMosh observed, "Things heavy up as the aptly titled 'Assault and Battery', driven along by pounding drumming from [Royall]. There is no let up as the no frills delivery of 'Tramp' is a heads down headbanger."
