= Band of Light =

Australian blues rock quartet

- Origin: Sydney, New South Wales, Australia
- Genres: Blues rock; hard rock
- Years active: 1972–1974
- Labels: Warner; Aztec
- Past members: Tony Buettel; Phil Key; Peter Roberts; Norm Roue; Ian Rilen; Billy Williams; Dannie Davidson; Eddie Hansen; Ray Vanderby

Band of Light were an Australian blues rock quartet formed in October 1972 by Tony Buettel on drums, Phil Key on lead vocals and guitar, Peter Roberts on bass guitar and Norm Roue on slide guitar. Roberts was soon replaced by Ian Rilen on bass guitar. They had a top 20 hit single, "The Destiny Song" (July 1973) on the Go-Set National Charts. The group released two albums, Total Union (August 1973) – which peaked at No. 13 – and The Archer (1974) before disbanding in late 1974. Phil Key died in May 1984 of a congenital heart condition; Ian Rilen died of bladder cancer in October 2006.

== History ==
Band of Light were an Australian blues-rock band formed in Sydney in October 1972 by New Zealand-born Phil Key (ex-the Mergers) on lead vocals and lead guitar from New Zealand-formed band the La De Da's, which had relocated to Sydney in 1968. He recruited latter day bandmate Peter Roberts (ex-Freshwater, the La De Da's) on bass guitar. Norm Roue (ex-Gutbucket, Lotus, Wolfe) on slide guitar and Tony Buettel (ex-Bay City Union, Levi Smith's Clefs, Fraternity, Band of Talabene) on drums joined to complete the line-up. Soon after, Ian Rilen (ex-Space, Lotus) replaced Roberts on bass guitar. They appeared at the 1973 Sunbury Music Festival in January and their track "Messin' with the Kid" was included on a live triple LP, Sunbury 1973 – The Great Australian Rock Festival. Their talent manager was Sebastian Chase.

The band was a vehicle for Key to develop his own songs, mostly co-written with his wife Pam Key, under the pseudonym of Wheel, using a quasi-religious philosophy that explored themes of racial equality, social justice, spiritual harmony and cosmic enlightenment. The music was energetic and funky with a heavy blues and boogie style interlaced with intense slide guitar work. In early 1973 they signed with WEA, which issued their debut single, "The Destiny Song", in July. Australian musicologist Ian McFarlane described it as an "infectious boogie rocker". It peaked at No. 18 on the Go-Set Singles Chart.

They worked consistently, touring from Sydney to Melbourne doing pub gigs and concerts, playing alongside Billy Thorpe & the Aztecs, Carson, Coloured Balls (Lobby Loyde's band), Chain, Madder Lake and Buffalo. They released their debut studio album Total Union in August 1973; it peaked at No. 13 on the Go-Set Albums Chart. Garry Raffaele of The Canberra Times observed that they "have the sort of deep, rumbling sound which turns on the disco-goers. It's thumpy and bumpy and makes you want to get up and dance your fool head off." McFarlane felt, "Mostly [it] was standard hard rock, slow 12-bar blues and boogie, but the best tracks revealed [the group] to be an energetic and funky rock band." Another single, "Free Them from Hunger", also appeared in August but did not chart. It was followed by a non-album single, "Moonstruck", in November and then a four-track self-titled compilation extended play; neither charted.

In mid-1974 Buettel, Rilen and Rouen all left. Rilen later reflected, "None of the songs fulfilled my need for rock 'n' roll religion... I like singing about drinking and rooting and love and life." Key formed a new line-up with Dannie Davidson (ex-Tamam Shud, Kahvas Jute) on drums and Billy Williams (ex-Classic Affair) on bass guitar to record the group's second album, The Archer, which was issued in that year. McFarlane noticed it has "a much drier sound than the debut and failed to chart." The band were expanded by Eddie Hansen (ex-Ticket) on lead guitar and Ray Vanderby on keyboards joining for live performances. Key disbanded the group in late 1974.

== Afterwards ==
Buettel became a record producer and worked with Uncanny X-Men and Strange Tenants in the 1980s. Key left the music industry and became a taxi driver in Sydney. Phillip Andrew Key died in May 1984 of a congenital heart condition. Peters worked with Chariot, Flake and Rockwell T. James, the Romantics and Audio Smash. Rilen was a member of various groups, Blackfeather (1975), Rose Tattoo (1976–77), Sardine v (1980–83), and X (1977–79, 1983–90). Ian William Rilen died from bladder cancer, at the age of 59, on 30 October 2006.

Band of Light's releases have been sought after as rarities with vinyl versions of Total Union fetching up to A$300, The Archer USD$100 and the EP, Band of Light USD$250. Total Union was re-released in May 2006 as a remastered CD with five bonus tracks.

== Band members ==
- Tony Buettel – drums (1972–74)
- Phil Key – lead vocals, guitar (1972–74)
- Peter Roberts – bass guitar (1972)
- Norm Roue – slide guitar (1972–74)
- Ian Rilen – bass guitar (1972–74)
- Billy Williams – bass guitar (1974)
- Dannie Davidson – drums (1974)
- Eddie Hansen – lead guitar (1974)
- Ray Vanderby – keyboards (1974)

== Discography ==
=== Studio albums ===
List of albums, with selected chart positions
Title	Album details	Peak chart positions
Title	Album details	AUS
Total Union	Released: August 1973; Format: LP; Label: Warner Music Group/WEA (WS 20011)	13
The Archer	Released: 1974; Format: LP; Label: Warner Music Group/WEA (600011)	–

=== EPs ===
Title	EP details
Band of Light	Released:1974; Format: LP; Label: Warner Music Group/WEA (EPW 261)

=== Singles ===
List of singles, with selected chart positions
Year	Title	Peak chart positions	Album
Year	Title	AUS	Album
1973	"The Destiny Song"	18	Band of Light
1973	"Free Them from Hunger"	–	Total Union
1973	"Moonstruck"	–	Band of Light
1974	"The Archer, A Sagittarian Rhapsody"	–	The Archer
