= Peter Wells (guitarist) =

Australian slide guitarist (1946–2006)

- Born: Peter William Wells; 31 December 1946; Brisbane, Queensland, Australia
- Died: 27 March 2006 (aged 59) Sydney, New South Wales, Australia
- Genres: Hard rock; heavy metal; blues; country; R&B
- Occupations: Musician; songwriter; producer
- Instruments: Guitar; bass
- Years active: 1966–2005
- Labels: Big Stars / Mushroom, ATI, Dog Meat / Shock, MGM
- Formerly of: The Odd Colours, Strange Brew, Head, Buffalo, Rose Tattoo, Scattered Aces, Lucy De Soto Band, Slightly Shadey, Heart Attack, Pete Wells Band, Hillbilly Moon, Blues Hangover, Romeo Dog

Peter William "Pete" Wells (13 December 1946 – 27 March 2006) was the founder and slide guitarist in Australian hard rock band, Rose Tattoo, from 1976 to 1983. He was previously bass guitarist with the pioneering heavy metal outfit Buffalo from 1971 to 1976. Wells also had a solo career and issued albums, Everything You Like Tries to Kill You (1991), The Meaning of Life (1992), No Hard Feelings (1993), Orphans (1994), Go Ahead, Call the Cops (1996), It's All Fun and Games 'till Somebody Gets Hurt (1999), Hateball (2000) and Solo (2002). In 2002, he was diagnosed with advanced prostate cancer and, on 27 March 2006, Wells died of the disease, aged 59. Rose Tattoo were inducted into the Australian Recording Industry Association (ARIA) Hall of Fame on 16 August of that same year.

== Biography ==
=== Early years to Buffalo ===
Peter William Wells, was born on 31 December 1946. In 1966 he was the bass guitarist of The Odd Colours with Ronnie Hausert, Steve Jones, Eddy Staarink, and Dave Tice on lead vocals. His next group was Strange Brew (1966–67) with Tice and Ray Frost. In Brisbane in 1968 Wells, Jones on drums, and Tice formed a blues band, Head (1968–71), with Neil Jensen on guitar and Peter Leighton. By mid-1970 Wells, as a member of Head, had moved to Sydney. In early 1971 Jones was replaced in the group by Paul Balbi on drums and Jensen made way for John Baxter on guitar.

In August 1971 Wells, Balbi, Baxter and Tice were joined by Alan Milano on co-lead vocals (ex-Mandala) to form Buffalo as a heavy rock group. Australian musicologist, Ian McFarlane, describes Buffalo as "one of Australia's pioneering heavy rock outfits ... Alongside Billy Thorpe and the Aztecs and Blackfeather, Buffalo was one of the loudest and heaviest bands of the day". Wells remained with Buffalo for their albums, Dead Forever... (June 1972), Volcanic Rock (July 1973), Only Want You for Your Body (June 1974) and Mother's Choice (March 1976). He also appeared on three tracks of their posthumous album, Average Rock 'n' Roller (July 1977). As a member of Buffalo Wells co-wrote the album tracks: "Leader" (1972), "Pound of Flesh" (1973), "On My Way" and "Essukay" (both 1976).

=== Rose Tattoo (1976–1983) ===
In 1976, Wells, initially on bass guitar, formed another hard rock band, Rose Tattoo, with Leigh Johnston on rhythm guitar, Tony Lake on lead vocals and Michael Vandersluys on drums. They were soon joined by Ian Rilen on bass guitar so that Wells could focus on slide guitar. According to Australian rock music journalist, Ed Nimmervoll, Wells had "decided to form the band that became Rose Tattoo, decided on their style of boogie and blues music, and their street look, united by their tattooed bodies". Further line-up changes resulted in Lake being replaced by Angry Anderson on lead vocals, Mick Cocks taking over from Johnston on rhythm guitar, and in 1977 Dallas Royall substituting for Vandersluys on drums. Their "peerless, street-level heavy blues with the emphasis on slide guitar" style had developed a strong following leading to Albert Productions offering them a record contract.

Their debut single, "Bad Boy for Love" (October 1977), became a top 20 hit on the Kent Music Report. In November of the next year their self-titled debut album established their reputation with production by Alberts' in-house producers, George Young and Harry Vanda, formerly of The Easybeats. Rilen left the band to be replaced by former Buster Brown bass guitarist, Geordie Leach. After the release of their second album, Assault and Battery (September 1981), the group embarked on an international tour. They were the loudest band to play at the Marquee Club in London since Led Zeppelin. Upon their return to Australia Robin Riley replaced Cocks on guitar. After the release of their third album Scarred for Life (November 1982), the band supported Aerosmith and then ZZ Top for several dates while on a three-month tour of North America. Wells, Riley and Royall all left Rose Tattoo in early 1983. For Rose Tattoo, Wells co-wrote at least 17 tracks, including the single, "One of the Boys" (1978).

=== $cattered Aces to Heart Attack (1983–1990) ===
In August 1983 Wells, on guitar, formed Scattered Aces (styled as $cattered Aces) with Paul De Marco aka Fred Zeppelin on drums (ex-Chris Turner Band); Ronnie Peel aka Rockwell T. James on bass guitar and lead vocals (ex-The Missing Links, Pleazers, Rockwell T. James & the Rhythm Aces, the La De Da's, John Paul Young & the All Stars, Cheetah); and former Buffalo bandmate, Chris Turner, on guitar and vocals (ex-Drain, Buffalo, Rockwell T. James & the Rhythm Aces). The group issued a six-track extended play, Six Pack, on Big Rock Records in April 1984. They followed with a cover version of Eddie Cochran's 1958 song, "C'mon Everybody", as a single but they had broken up by mid-1984.

In November 1984 Wells established Illustrated Men, with former Rose Tattoo members, Cocks on guitar (ex-Heaven by then), Leach on bass guitar, Rilen on lead vocals (X), and Royall on drums. The group "played loud, barnstorming rock'n'roll" but was "designed to be a short-term touring venture". They toured into 1985 performing material largely written by Rilen before disbanding.

Wells and Leach (aka Fast Eddie) joined a blues group, Lucy De Soto Band, with De Soto (aka Patricia Anne Clements) on lead vocals, piano and Hammond organ (ex-Living Daylights, Fat Time); and Ross Mercer on drums. Their debut album, Three Girls and a Sailor, appeared in 1985. They followed with a second album, Help Me Rhonda, My Boyfriend's Back, in August of the next year. By that time the line up was Wells, De Soto, Leach and Charlie Watts on drums. For the next three years, Wells and De Soto, lived "in the foothills behind the Gold Coast ... in semi-retirement".

Wells, De Marco, Peel and Turner briefly performed as Slightly Shadey in 1987. In January 1990 Wells and De Soto established another group, Heart Attack, with Cocks, De Marco and Mick Strutt on bass guitar. In March they supported Hitmen DTK on a national tour, Kathryn Whitfield of The Canberra Times noted that Heart Attack "consists of well-known Australian musicians who simply refuse to take holidays (or in some cases, retire)" and Wells "takes centre stage also assuming the role of vocalist".

=== Early solo work to Blues Hangover (1990–1996) ===
By mid-1990 Wells began recording his debut solo album, Everything You Like Tries to Kill You (late 1990), which "gave full vent to Wells' wry, sardonic world-view". Wells and De Soto co-wrote eight of ten tracks. Wells supplied banjo, dobro, guitars (lead, acoustic, bass, electric, slide and steel), harmonica and lead vocals; while De Soto provided keyboards, organ (Hammond), percussion, piano, and both lead and background vocals.

They used session musicians including Stuart Fraser on guitars, drums and vocals (from Noiseworks); Jim Hilbun on backing vocals (from The Angels); Mark Meyer on drums (ex-Richard Clapton Band, Moving Pictures, Mark Gillespie Band); Ted Pepper on saxophone; and Jon Stevens on backing vocals (from Noiseworks). It was produced by Fraser, Stevens and Kevin Shirley (Lime Spiders) for the Big Stars label and distributed by Mushroom Records. According to McFarlane the album had "mixed country, bluesy boogies and laid-back rock'n'roll".

To support the release Wells and De Soto formed the Pete Wells Band in 1991 but "played raunchy, traditional Aussie pub rock". The early line-up included Wells on guitar, slide guitar and lead vocals; De Soto on piano, keyboards and backing vocals; Warwick Fraser on drums (ex-Feather, The Screaming Tribesmen); Tim Gaze on lead guitar (ex-Tamam Shud, Kahvas Jute, Ariel, Rose Tattoo); and Michael Vidale on bass guitar (ex-Jimmy and the Boys). In August that year Wells produced the debut album, Nightstreet, by AOR band, Roxus. It peaked at No. 5 on the ARIA Albums Chart.

His second solo album, The Meaning of Life, appeared in July of the following year, which was "more straight-up rock'n'blues". It was co-produced by Fraser and Stevens. In the studio he used De Soto, Gaze and Strutt with Bernie Bremond on saxophone (ex-Johnny Diesel and the Injectors) and Scott Johnson on drums (ex-Jimmy and the Boys, Rose Tattoo).

Wells also worked on side projects including Rocks Push with Turner and Rob Grosser. Early in 1993 Wells rejoined Rose Tattoo with the line-up of Anderson, Cocks and Leach adding De Marco as their new drummer. During the brief reunion they supported two gigs by United States group, Guns N' Roses, on the Australian leg of their Use Your Illusion Tour. Rose Tattoo also played solo shows on their own pub tour. In 1994 Hillbilly Moon formed with Wells on lead vocals, lead and bass guitars; Cletis Carr on the same instruments; and Paul Norton on the same instruments plus drums. They issued an album, Volume One, in that year on Pelican Records in Australia, and Blue Rose Records in Europe. In 1996, they recorded a second album, Volume Two, which remains unreleased, save for one track that appeared on an ABC Music compilation, Open Road II.

His third solo album, No Hard Feelings, appeared in June 1993 and was recorded with De Soto, Bremond, De Marco and Leach. It was co-produced by Wells and De Soto for ATI Records and Mushroom Records. In August that year it was followed by a four-track EP, Hard Done by You, co-credited to Peter Wells, Dave Steel (ex-Weddings Parties Anything), Bob Armstrong. In late 1994 Wells and De Soto reactivated Pete Wells Band with Turner and were joined by Mark Evans on bass guitar (ex-AC/DC, Finch, Heaven) and Mick O'Shea on drums (ex-Swanee, Judge Mercy). In the next year the line-up with Wells and De Soto were Cocks, De Marco and Andy Cichon on bass guitar (ex-Rose Tattoo, James Reyne Band, Judge Mercy). Wells issued his fourth solo album, Orphans, in June that year, which was co-produced by Wells and De Soto.

Wells and De Soto travelled to Germany to work with a studio band, Romeo Dog, which recorded a self-titled album. Fellow musicians were Cichon, O'Shea and Andy Anderson on lead vocals. The album appeared in 1996, McFarlane noted that their sound "mixed raucous bar-room blues with hard rock grunt". Before its release Wells and De Soto had returned to Australia and, in Melbourne, worked with an R&B outfit, Blues Hangover, which included Ken Farmer on drums; Dave Hogan on vocals and harmonica; and Warren Rough guitar (all from The Paramount Trio); plus John Stax on bass guitar (ex-The Pretty Things). They issued their self-titled album in 1995 and a second album, Roadrunner, in the next year both on the Dog Meat label. McFarlane felt the releases showed a "passionate, gritty brand of R&B".

=== Later solo work and side projects (1996–2006) ===
In 1996 Wells and De Soto recruited Tim Hemensley on bass guitar and Timmy Jack Ray on drums (both from Powder Monkeys) to fill out another version of Pete Wells Band. They recorded an album, Go Ahead Call the Cops, which was produced by the band and issued in October that year on Dog Meat and Shock Records. During 1998 and the following year, Wells toured in Rose Tattoo as well as working on his solo material.

His next album, Its All Fun & Games 'til Somebody Gets Hurt, appeared in February 1999, which was produced by Wells and De Soto. McFarlane felt was "another rough’n’tumble collection of blues’n’boogie bar band rock". In November that year he contributed to De Soto's next album, Take this Veil, which was issued on the Full Moon label. Wells and De Soto worked on another Pete Wells Band album, Hateball (2000), before Wells teamed with Angry Anderson to release Damn Fine Band in 2001. Pete Wells Band issued their next album, Solo in the following February on MGM. Also in July year Rose Tattoo, with Wells aboard, released a reunion album, Pain.

In 2004 Wells and De Soto formed Lucy De Soto and the Handsome Devils which focused on blues with Wells on slide guitar, De Soto on lead vocals and piano, and Grosser on drums. They issued a self-titled album in that year and soon followed with two more albums, Low Down and Travelling and Whiskey Dance. In September 2004 the Pete Wells Band issued their next album, Mother's Worry. Wells died of prostate cancer on 27 March 2006, although another solo album, Greetings from the Aloha Monkey, appeared in May that year. Another posthumous album, Bodgie Dada (April 2008), had been recorded by Wells, De Soto and Grosser in December 2005.

== Personal life ==
Since 1985, Wells had worked professionally with Lucy De Soto (aka Patricia Mary Clements). They continued to work as fellow band members, co-composers, co-producers and on each other's solo projects and other works. Wells moved from Melbourne back to Sydney in the late 1990s where he worked in the tattoo parlour, House of Pain in Annandale, ran by Steve King (Rose Tattoo bass player from 2000).

In 2002, Wells was diagnosed with advanced prostate cancer but it was inoperable. Australian musicians played benefit gigs for him in September and October 2005 including Rose Tattoo, Peter Garrett, The Beasts of Bourbon, Tex, Don and Charlie, Paul Kelly and Tim Rogers and the Temperance Union. Wells was too weak to play a full set with Rose Tattoo but joined them on "Bad Boy for Love".

Wells died on 27 March 2006, aged 59, from the disease, which had metastasized. He had been hospitalised for the previous five weeks "suffering much pain".

His daughter, Katrina Kennedy, provided a eulogy at St Brendan's Church in Annandale. Other eulogies were delivered by David Tice (former bandmate) and his brother-in-law, Greg Young. His funeral was attended by fellow band members and musicians.

His band, Rose Tattoo, was inducted into the Australian Recording Industry Association (ARIA) Hall of Fame on 16 August of the same year. A week before his death, Wells was visited in hospital by members of Rose Tattoo, he told them to continue recording their next album, Blood Brothers (February 2007).

== Discography ==
Peter Wells is credited with: banjo, dobro, guitars (lead, acoustic, bass, electric, slide and steel), lead vocals, harmonica, drums, mandolin, cymbals, piano, vox organ, saxophone, producer, camera operator, editor.

=== Albums ===
List of albums, with selected chart positions
Title	Album details	Peak chart positions
Title	Album details	AUS
Everything You Like Tries to Kill You	Released: 1990; Format: LP, CD, cassette; Label: Big Stars! (D30489)	91
The Meaning of Life	Released: 1992; Format: CD, cassette; Label: Big Stars! (D30779)	—
No Hard Feelings	Released: 1993; Format: CD; Label: Mushroom (AT1001)	—
Orphans	Released: 1994; Format: CD; Label: Ravenwood (RV1012)	—
Go Ahead, Call the Cops (As Pete Wells Band)	Released: 1996; Format: CD; Label: Dog Meat (DOG081CD)	—
It's All Fun & Games 'Till Somebody Gets Hurt (As Pete Wells Band)	Released: 1999; Format: CD; Label: Pack 0'20 Records	—
Hateball (As Pete Wells Band)	Released: 2000 (Germany); Format: CD; Label: Steamhammer	—
Angry Anderson Pete Wells & The Damn Fine Band (with Angry Anderson)	Released: 2001; Format: CD; Label: Angry Anderson & Pete Wells	—
Solo	Released: 2001; Format: CD; Label: Pack 0'20 Records (20Pack003)	—
Mothers Worry	Released: 2005; Format: CD; Label: Pack 0'20 Records	—
Greetings from the Aloha Monkey	Released: May 2006; Format: CD; Label:	—
Bodgie Dada	Released: April 2008; Format: CD; Label: Peter Wells	—

== See also ==
- Buffalo
- Hillbilly Moon
- Rose Tattoo
