= Ian Rilen =

Australian musician

Background information
- Born: Ian William Rilen; 12 August 1947; Bendigo, Victoria, Australia
- Died: 30 October 2006 (aged 59) Melbourne, Victoria, Australia
- Genres: Blues rock; hard rock; punk rock; post-punk
- Occupations: Musician; songwriter
- Instruments: Bass; guitar; vocals
- Years active: 1971–2006
- Labels: WEA; Alberts

Ian William Rilen (12 August 1947 – 30 October 2006) was an Australian musician. He was bass guitarist and a songwriter with rock and roll band Rose Tattoo and punk rock group X. Rilen was born in Bendigo, Victoria, started his musical career in Sydney and later lived in Melbourne.

Rilen was a member of 1970s progressive blues group Band of Light and other bands, including Space, Blue Aliens, Blackfeather, Sardine v, Hell to Pay, Skindiver and Illustrated Men. Rilen wrote one of Rose Tattoo's biggest hits, "Bad Boy for Love", and co-wrote "Stuck on You" with his first wife Stephanie Falconer (née Hancock), which was covered by Hunters & Collectors. Rilen was diagnosed with bladder cancer early in 2006 and died on 30 October, aged 59.

== Biography ==
Ian William Rilen was born on 12 August 1947 in Bendigo, Victoria to Jean and William Rilen. He grew up in Torquay and became a surfer.

After various jobs including window dresser, screen printer and sign writer, Rilen turned to a career in music. He played in progressive rock band, Lotus including at the Myponga Festival in January–February 1971. He then joined Space during 1971–1972.

Rilen was bass guitarist for Band of Light during 1972–1974. The progressive blues group formed in Sydney but relocated to Melbourne, and released two albums, Total Union (1973) and The Archer (1974) (both on WEA Records). They had a No. 18 hit single on the Go-Set top 40 with "Destiny Song" in July 1973. Total Union peaked at No. 14 on Go-Set's top 20 albums chart in September. Rilen left in mid-1974 and the band broke up by year's end.

During 1975, he teamed with former bandmate, slide guitarist, Norm Roue (ex-Lotus, Band of Light), in the short-lived Blue Aliens with Roy Johnson. Late in 1975, he joined Blackfeather which previously had hits with "Seasons of Change" (No. 15, 1971) and "Boppin' the Blues" (No. 1, 1972).

=== Rose Tattoo ===
Rose Tattoo was formed in Sydney in 1976 with Leigh Johnston on rhythm guitar, Tony Lake on lead vocals. and led by Peter Wells, who had just departed as bass guitarist of heavy metal band Buffalo. Drummer Michael Vandersluys completed the line-up. Rilen joined on bass guitar to allow Wells to concentrate on his slide guitar. Rhythm guitarist Mick Cocks soon replaced Johnston; Lake and Vandersluys were substituted by former Buster Brown members Angry Anderson and Dallas "Digger" Royall respectively.

Rose Tattoo's hard-rocking sound quickly earned a devoted following in the Sydney area. Members of AC/DC were fans and recommended them to their label, Albert Productions. The band's debut single "Bad Boy for Love" was written by Rilen, who left to form punk rock group, X, prior to its release in October 1977. "Bad Boy for Love" was produced by Vanda & Young (ex-The Easybeats, AC/DC's producers) and peaked at No. 19 on the Australian Kent Music Report Singles Chart. Cocks switched to bass guitar to cover Rilen's departure, then Chris Turner (ex-Buffalo) was brought in.

"I hope I haven't done all the things people have told me I've done the night before."

-Ian Rilen

=== X ===
Ian Rilen on bass, playing his unique fast down stroke style, formed X with Steve Lucas on guitar and vocals, Ian Krahe on guitar (who used to literally have blood on his hands from his thrashing playing style without a pick, by the end of a show), and Steve Cafiero on drums in the late 1970s.

During X's history the lineup changed twice. The first was caused by the death of Ian Krahe, which reduced the band to three members before they recorded their first album X-Aspirations (1979) in five hours at Trafalgar Studios in Sydney. The lineup changed a second time on their first Melbourne tour when the band reformed in the early 1980s. The tour was organised by then manager Nick Chance with booking agent Gerard Schlaghecke at Premier Artists in Melbourne, another long time fan of X. Cafiero had always said he would not go to Melbourne; when advised of tour dates, he stuck to his word and would not go, citing family commitments and the fact that his career choice of real estate would be in the balance if he did.

When told by Nick Chance of Cafiero's decision not to go, booking agent Gerard suggested drummer Cathy Green, who was based in Canberra. Gerard knew Green was a huge fan of X, and thus knew the songs, and was a great drummer in her own right who could fill in to save the Melbourne tour. Luckily Cathy agreed to do it, on a few days' notice. There were two hastily organised rehearsals prior to the Melbourne shows, which turned out to be a huge success. Cathy brought a new fresh yet solid feel to the band. Tragically, not long after that, Cafiero died when injected with a dye prior to an X-ray for a back complaint and Cathy became a permanent final member of X.

The At Home With You (1985) album recorded in Melbourne, which included new songs inspired in part by Cathy, was made at Richmond Recorders, and engineered by Tony Cohen.

The X And More (1989) followed. This, along with its two predecessors, was produced by Lobby Loyde, who was briefly a member of Rose Tattoo in 1979–1980.

=== Sardine v ===
During X's first hiatus (1980–1983), he formed the post punk outfit Sardine v, with his then wife, Stephanie Rilen (née Hancock, later Falconer) on keyboards and lead vocals. According to Rilen, "I didn't know [Stephanie] played until I bought a keyboard for the kids and I was writing songs in my room at the house. She just walked by and played a line on the keyboards. I said: 'Do that again'".

Sardine v's debut single, "Sabotage" (1981), was followed by "Sudan" (written by Falconer) which was shown on ABC-TV's Countdown in 1982 with Rilen on guitar, Falconer on keyboards and lead vocals, and Johanna Pigott (ex-XL Capris) on bass guitar. "Stuck on You", co-written by Rilen and Falconer, was covered by Hunters & Collectors on their 1986 album, Human Frailty; Stephanie Rilen later married Doug Falconer from that band.

=== Later career ===
Rilen reinstated X in 1983, which included drummer Cathy Green from 1984, with whom he later formed a domestic partnership.

During 1984–1985, Rilen also joined with ex-Rose Tattoo members, Cocks, Georgie Leach, Royall and Wells to form Illustrated Man. This was followed in 1990 by The Big Rider (with Green), then Hell to Pay (1991–1993) and a return to X thereafter.

Rilen worked with Ian Moss (Cold Chisel) during recording of Petrolhead (1996), playing bass and co-writing songs for the album and later also toured for a short time with Moss.

Rilen rejoined Rose Tattoo in 1998 for the All Hell Breaks Loose Tour with fellow Australian band, The Angels.

Rilen's solo album was Love is Murder (2001), while Passion, Boots & Bruises (2004) is credited to Ian Rilen & the Love Addicts. A second album with the Love Addicts, The Family from Cuba, was recorded shortly before his death and released in 2007.

== Death ==
Rilen was diagnosed with bladder cancer early in 2006. Rilen was invited to the Jack Awards in 2006, to play in an all-star tribute band for his departed Rose Tattoo bandmate Pete Wells who had died of prostate cancer on 27 March. He left his hospital bed to attend Rose Tattoo's ARIA Hall of Fame induction on 16 August. Two tribute concerts were held for him on 5 and 6 October.

Rilen died at the age of 59 on 30 October 2006. Three other Rose Tattoo members have died of cancer, besides Rilen and Wells: Royall in 1991, Loyde (also producer for X) in 2007, and Cocks in 2009.

== Personal life ==
He was married twice, first to Stephanie Falconer and second to Sofia Fitzpatrick. His domestic partners included Cathy Green and Brigitte.

Rilen had five children: Alicia Ann Macfarlane, Jai Jai Rilen, Gentilla, Tallulah (with Falconer) and Romeo (with Brigitte).

== Discography ==
=== Albums ===
Ian Rilen

- Love is Murder (2001)

Ian Rilen & the Love Addicts

- Passion Boots & Bruises (2004)
- The Family from Cuba (2007)
