= Rose Tattoo =

Australian rock band

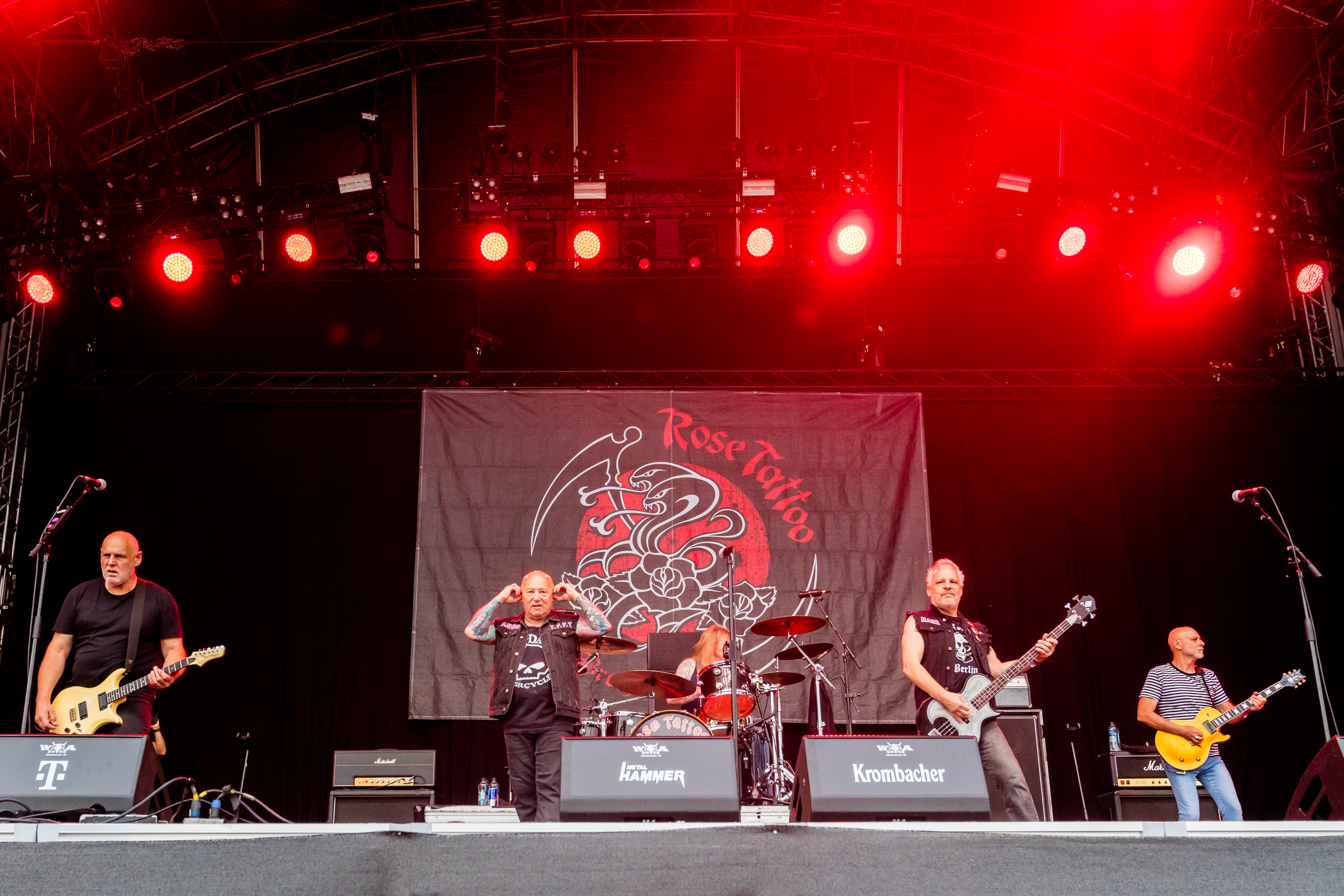
- Rose Tattoo at Wacken Open Air 2022; Left to right: Mick Arnold, Angry Anderson, Paul DeMarco (obscured), Mark Evans, Bob Spencer

Background information
- Origin: Sydney, Australia
- Genres: Rock and roll; hard rock; blues rock; pub rock; punk rock
- Years active: 1976–1987; 1992–1993; 1998–present
- Labels: Albert; Mushroom; SPV
- Members: Paul DeMarco; Steve King; Mick Arnold; Ronnie Simmons
- Past members: List of Rose Tattoo members
- Website: rosetattoo.com.au

Rose Tattoo are an Australian rock band which formed in Sydney in 1976 and was led by frontman and sole constant member Angry Anderson from 1976 until his death in 2026. Their sound is hard rock mixed with blues rock influences, with songs including "Bad Boy for Love", "Rock 'n' Roll Outlaw", "Nice Boys", "We Can't Be Beaten" and "Scarred for Life". Their first four albums were produced by Harry Vanda and George Young who also worked with AC/DC. They disbanded in 1987, subsequently reforming briefly in 1993 to support Guns N' Roses on an Australian tour. They reassembled again from 1998 and have since released two more studio albums.

According to Australian rock music historian Ian McFarlane, Rose Tattoo are "one of the most revered bands of all time. The Tatts played peerless, street-level heavy blues with the emphasis on slide guitar and strident lyric statements". On 16 August 2006, they were inducted into the Australian Recording Industry Association (ARIA) Hall of Fame.

== History ==
=== Early years (1976–1977) ===
Rose Tattoo were formed in Sydney in 1976 with Leigh Johnston on rhythm guitar and Tony Lake on lead vocals; they were led by slide guitarist Peter Wells who had departed as bass guitarist of heavy metal band Buffalo. Drummer Michael Vandersluys completed the line-up. Ian Rilen from Band of Light joined on bass guitar. Their talent manager, Sebastian Chase, who had managed both Band of Light and Buffalo, recommended Rilen to Wells. Rilen had taught himself to play while in prison and gave Wells' band the street-cred he was looking for. Rhythm guitarist Mick Cocks soon replaced Johnston; Lake and Vandersluys were replaced by former Buster Brown members Angry Anderson and Dallas "Digger" Royall, respectively. Melbourne-based Buster Brown had played at the 1974 Sunbury Festival and had included future AC/DC drummer Phil Rudd. Rose Tattoo had an early performance on New Year's Eve at the local rock club Chequers.

Chiefly inspired by the Rolling Stones, Faces and Billy Thorpe and his 1970s Aztecs, Rose Tattoo's hard-rocking sound quickly earned a following in the Sydney area. Members of AC/DC were fans and recommended them to their label, Albert Productions. The band's debut single, "Bad Boy for Love", was written by Rilen, who left to form punk rock group X (not the L.A. band) prior to its release in October 1977. "Bad Boy for Love" was produced by Vanda & Young (formerly of the Easybeats, AC/DC's producers) and peaked at No. 19 on the Australian Kent Music Report Singles Chart. Initially Cocks switched to bass guitar to cover Rilen's departure, then Chris Turner (ex-Buffalo) joined on bass guitar. The band toured nationally on the pub rock circuit competing with the Angels, Cold Chisel, Dragon and Kevin Borich Express.

=== Self titled debut, success and follow-up albums (1978–1982) ===
One-time Buster Brown bass guitarist Geordie Leach was recruited to record their self-titled debut LP, Rose Tattoo, which reached the top 40 on the Australian Kent Music Report Albums Chart in November 1978. The album, produced by Vanda & Young, was released in some markets as Rock N' Roll Outlaw after their second single, "Rock N' Roll Outlaw", which did not reach the top 50. Leach left the band in May 1979 to be replaced in October by guitarist Lobby Loyde filling in on bass guitar (Coloured Balls, Purple Hearts, Wild Cherries). During his brief tenure, they recorded "Legalise Realise" which was released as an independent split single in March 1980; the other track, "Bong on Aussie", was by country singer Colin Paterson, to publicise a campaign to legalise marijuana. Later in 1980, they toured the United States and then toured Europe (including United Kingdom), but by September Loyde had left and Leach returned.

Early in 1981, "Rock N' Roll Outlaw" started to chart in Europe, peaking at No. 2 in France, No. 5 in Germany and No. 60 in UK. The line up of Anderson, Cocks, Leach, Royall and Wells toured Europe from April. Three years after their debut the band issued the follow-up album Assault and Battery in September, which reached the top 30 in Australia. Both Rock N' Roll Outlaw and Assault and Battery peaked at No. 1 on the UK heavy metal albums chart. Rose Tattoo's 1981 tour of Europe included an appearance at the Reading Festival, where Anderson repeatedly head butted the amp stacks until his scalp started bleeding. They were hailed as the loudest band to play London's Marquee Club since Led Zeppelin.

Returning to Australia, the band began work on their third album; with new guitarist Robin Riley replacing Cocks, who went on to join Heaven, they issued Scarred for Life in 1982, subsequently touring the US in support of Aerosmith and ZZ Top. The band's US visit was not a major success but proved to be influential on the underground sleaze metal scene in Los Angeles, with bands such as Guns N' Roses later citing Rose Tattoo as a favourite, recording a cover of "Nice Boys" on Live ?!*@ Like a Suicide in 1986.

=== Southern Stars and Beats from a Single Drum (1983–1986) ===
In 1983, after the US tour, Riley, Royall and Wells all left. The remaining duo of Anderson and Leach recruited guitarists Greg Jordan and John Meyer from Perth progressive metal band Saracen. With drummer Scott Johnston (Jimmy and the Boys, Outline, Kids in the Kitchen, Flash in the Pan, Swanee, Peter Wells) the band recorded 1984's Southern Stars, their last album for Albert Productions and Vanda & Young as producers. Leach then exited to join Cocks, Rilen, Royall and Wells in Illustrated Men, which toured during 1984–85.

Anderson took time out to play the character 'Ironbar' Bassey in the 1985 film Mad Max Beyond Thunderdome. That year Rose Tattoo, with the line-up of Anderson, Johnston, Meyer, Andy Cichon (bass) and Tim Gaze (slide guitar), released a cover of Steppenwolf's "Born to be Wild", their first release for Mushroom Records. Meyer left and the group recorded 1986's Beats from a Single Drum as a four-piece for Mushroom. Soon after Anderson started his solo career and the band separated by the end of 1987. The album was subsequently re-released as Anderson's first solo album, with the ballad "Suddenly" as his debut solo single. "Suddenly" had little chart success until it was used on TV soap opera, Neighbours, for the wedding of characters Scott Robinson (Jason Donovan) and Charlene Mitchell (Kylie Minogue). "Suddenly" peaked at No. 2 in September 1987 and was kept out of top spot by Minogue's own debut single, "Locomotion".

=== Side projects and temporary reformations (1988–1997) ===
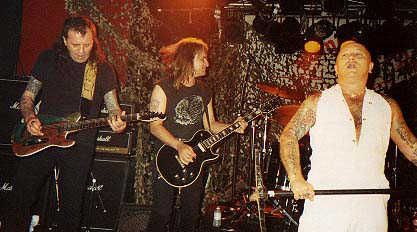
Rose Tattoo in 1993; Angry Anderson at right

In the early 1990s, Anderson tried to reunite Rose Tattoo, but Dallas Royall died in 1991 of cancer while being treated for his heroin addiction and alcoholism, which delayed that reformation. Anderson explained to Nick Milligan in March 2011, "I was in Los Angeles in 1989 recording an album which the 'Bound for Glory' single came off and I was hanging around with the Gunners and a lot of other LA bad boy rock bands that we supposedly influenced. I realised then that apart from the fact that I was there to establish myself as a singer songwriter, there was still this great following for the band. I rang up the other members and said 'Let's reform. We've been apart for three years or more.' It was long enough for us to settle our differences and let all the wounds heal. I rang up each of the original members that were still interested and they all said, 'Yeah, let's get together.' So I said we should negotiate a deal where the band can come over and record in Los Angeles. But, of course, that was the year that our original drummer "Digger" Royall kicked his heroin habit. While he was recovering on methadone, cancer exploded through his body, quite sadly. That was the irony of it, because the cancer had been suppressed by the heroin addiction. Within months he was dead. That shook the band so badly on a personal level, because we had been so enthusiastic to reform. We didn't reform until '92".

Rose Tattoo supported Guns N' Roses on the Australian leg of their Use Your Illusion Tour. Anderson, Wells, Cocks, Leach were joined by new drummer, Paul DeMarco, from Wells' solo band reunited for the 1993 tour. The reunion was brief as each returned to solo projects. Around this time, some ex-members of Rose Tattoo formed a short-lived band with ex-Candy Harlots vocalist Aiz Lynch. It had numerous rehearsals, but only recorded one demo before disbanding.

=== Second reformation: Pain to Blood Brothers (1998–2010) ===
Rose Tattoo, with original bassist Ian Rilen replacing Leach, reformed yet again in 1998 for the "All Hell Breaks Loose!!" tour; however Rilen remained with the band only for the duration of this tour. By the following year, Leach had returned to the fold once more, although his place was taken by Steve King in 2000.

Since that time Rose Tattoo has toured regularly around Australia and throughout Europe. In 2000, the band appeared at the Wacken Open Air festival as part of their tour. These shows formed the basis of the 25 to Life live album. At the Gimme Ted benefit concert on 10 March 2001 the group performed five songs. 2002 saw the release of Pain, the band's first studio album in 16 years. Cocks rejoined the group and they prepared material for a future album.

Plans for their next album, Blood Brothers were disrupted when Wells died on 27 March 2006, four years after his diagnosis of prostate cancer. On 16 August Rose Tattoo were inducted by musician Sarah McLeod, into the Australian Recording Industry Association (ARIA) Hall of Fame alongside former member Lobby Loyde and Daddy Cool, Divinyls, Icehouse and Helen Reddy. Anderson had informed Wells of the forthcoming induction, "He was chuffed, I was so glad he knew about it. It's good we're getting recognized for the music. We've gone out and done it our own way, to our detriment or to our betterment." Founding member Ian Rilen died on 30 October from bladder cancer. One of his last public appearances was at the Hall of Fame induction.

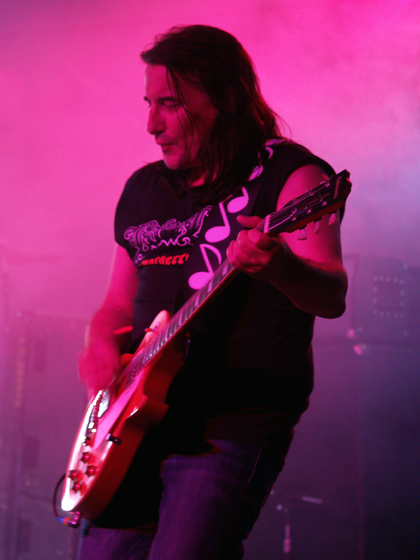
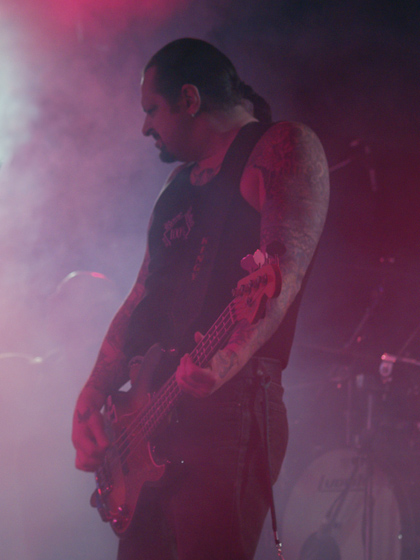
Rose Tattoo at Meredith Festival 2006

Also in October, a number of Rose Tattoo songs were voted upon and ranked in the Triple M Essential 2006 Countdown of songs, including "Bad Boy for Love" (voted No. 1060 out of 2006) and "We Can't Be Beaten" (voted No. 397 out of 2006). That month they were one of 55 acts voted and played in Triple J's Impossible Music Festival of 2006, with their live recording of a gig performed on New Year's Day 1980 at Mount Druitt, New South Wales being selected out of over 1000 Live at the Wireless recordings over the radio station's 31-year history.

On 21 April 2007, Lobby Loyde died, aged 65, two years after being diagnosed with lung cancer. In June, Rose Tattoo supported Guns N' Roses with Sebastian Bach on their Chinese Democracy Tour's Australian leg. In October they supported Motörhead on their Australian tour dates. In an interview with Australian rock magazine Unbelievably Bad, Anderson announced his intention to retire the band after one more album.

In 2008 they played the Download Festival in England. In April 2009 it was announced that guitarist Mick Cocks had liver cancer – he died on 22 December. By 2010 five former members had died of various cancers – Dallas Royall (cancer, 1991), Peter Wells (prostate cancer, 2006), Ian Rilen (bladder cancer, 2006), Lobby Loyde (lung cancer, 2007) and Mick Cocks (liver cancer, 2009).

=== Final statement to Outlaws (2011–present) ===
Rose Tattoo celebrated their 35th anniversary in 2011. They were demo-ing songs for a proposed new album and Anderson had told Milligan that it would be the group's "final statement" but that did not eventuate. They were uncertain of continuing when DeMarco was arrested in September 2014: he pled guilty to gun supply offences and was sentenced to a minimum of six years jail. On 5 August 2017 a new line-up of Anderson, Dai Pritchard, Bob Spencer, Mark Evans and John "Watto" Watson was announced. In August 2018 a new drummer joined, Jackie Barnes, the son of Australian vocalist, Jimmy Barnes.

The band toured Europe during March 2020 with Justin Ngariki on drums. They released a new album, Outlaws, on Cleopatra Records in that month. In May 2020, they were due to tour the US for the first time since 1982, but the tour was deferred due to COVID-19 restrictions. Outlaws is a re-recording of the band's debut album, Rose Tattoo, plus three early songs, which did not appear on the 1978 release: "Snow Queen", "Sweet Love (Rock n Roll)" and "Rosetta". Anderson provided the reasons behind making the album, "Honouring the past and respecting the future." It was recorded at Hercules Studio, Sydney by Mark Opitz and Tim McArtney. It was produced by Opitz, and mixed by Opitz, Spencer and McArtney. Liner notes were written by the author, Murray Engleheart.

On 1 September 2020 it was announced through Rose Tattoo's social media that John Meyer, the group's slide guitarist from 1983 to 1985, had died.

Dai Pritchard announced his retirement from Rose Tattoo on 14 April 2021 via Facebook, leaving the band amicably to move into a new career in mental health. When the band resumed live performances in 2022, Paul DeMarco was back behind the drums and Mick Arnold had taken over slide guitar duties. Later that year, Bob Spencer announced his retirement from the band via Facebook on 18 September 2022; he was then replaced by Ronnie Simmons.

In 2024, the band announced they would record a final album and end as an active touring unit on New Year's Eve, 2026, marking exactly 50 years since their first live appearance. Mark Evans was replaced by Steve King shortly after and recording began on a new album. A version of Stevie Wright's "Hard Road" was released as a single in January 2025.

Rose Tattoo toured Australia for most of 2025 and selected shows in the US in early 2026. They announced their One Last Ride tour of Europe for the summer of 2026, appearing at Wacken Open Air and other festival and club dates. On 9 August, a day before they were to appear at the Alcatraz Metal Festival in Belgium as headliners, Rose Tattoo announced that the rest of the tour had been cancelled due to Anderson having a major medical condition. Confirmation he had had a cardiac arrest was made on 31 August. Rose Tattoo's last ever live show was at the Live Music Hall, Cologne on 7 August 2026. On 23 September 2026, it was announced that Anderson, the sole constant member on all of the band's albums, had died two days prior, at the age of 79.

== Members ==
=== Most recent lineup ===
- Angry Anderson – lead vocals (1976–1987, 1992–1993, 1998–2026; his death)
- Paul DeMarco – drums (1992–2016, 2021–present)
- Steve King – bass guitar, backing vocals (2000-2007, 2024–present)
- Mick Arnold – slide guitar, backing vocals (2022–present)
- Ronnie Simmons – guitar (2022–present)

== Discography ==
- Rose Tattoo (1978)
- Assault & Battery (1981)
- Scarred for Life (1982)
- Southern Stars (1984)
- Beats from a Single Drum (1986)
- Pain (2002)
- Blood Brothers (2007)
- Outlaws (2020)

== Awards ==
=== ARIA Music Awards ===
The ARIA Music Awards is an annual awards ceremony that recognises excellence, innovation, and achievement across all genres of Australian music. They commenced in 1987. Rose Tattoo were inducted into the Hall of Fame in 2006.

Year	Nominee / work	Award	Result
2006	Rose Tattoo	ARIA Hall of Fame	inductee
