= Angry Anderson =

Australian rock singer (1947–2026)

Angry Anderson AM
- Anderson with Rose Tattoo at Wacken Open Air 2022

Background information
- Born: Gary Stephen Anderson; 5 August 1947; Melbourne, Victoria, Australia
- Died: 21 September 2026 (aged 79) Sydney, New South Wales, Australia
- Genres: Hard rock; blues rock; rock and roll
- Occupations: Rock singer; songwriter; actor; television personality; political candidate
- Years active: 1971–2026
- Labels: Mushroom; Festival
- Formerly of: Rose Tattoo; Buster Brown; the Party Boys
- Spouse: Lindy Michael (m. 1986–2002)
- Award: Full list
- Political party: National (NSW); Australian Liberty Alliance
- Movement: Anti-Islam in Australia
- Website: www.angryanderson.com

Gary Stephen "Angry" Anderson (5 August 1947 – 21 September 2026) was an Australian rock singer, songwriter, television personality, actor, and political candidate. He was best known as the lead vocalist and the longest-tenured remaining member of the Australian hard rock band Rose Tattoo from 1976. He was also a past member of rock bands Buster Brown and the Party Boys.

As a solo artist, he was best known for his debut single, "Suddenly" (1987), which achieved international success, peaking at number 2 on the Australian Music Report, number 31 on the Belgian Ultratop 50, number 11 on the New Zealand Singles Chart, number 3 on the Irish Singles Chart, number 69 on the Netherlands Singles Chart, and number 3 on the UK Singles Chart, respectively.

On Australia Day 26 January 1993, Anderson was made a Member of the Order of Australia for his role as a youth advocate. According to rock music historian Ian McFarlane, "over the course of a lengthy career, [the] gravel-throated vocalist ... has gone from attention-grabbing, rock'n'roll bad boy to all-round Australian media star." Rose Tattoo were inducted into the Australian Recording Industry Association (ARIA) Hall of Fame in 2006.

== Life and career ==
Gary Stephen Anderson was born on 5 August 1947 in Melbourne, Victoria, to an Anglo-Australian father and Mauritian mother. He has a brother, Rodney, living in Melbourne. According to Ian McFarlane, Anderson's nickname of "Angry Ant" developed "during his youth after his aggressive and volatile nature got the better of him". According to Anderson, his father "was a deeply troubled man... I've dealt with my rage, my pain... I was a very angry boy... When he was around he was a very explosive person."

Anderson used his uncle Ivan as his role model: a cigarette-smoking, beer-drinking, leather jacket-wearing, motorcycle-riding drummer in a swing band. Anderson grew up in suburban Coburg and attended Coburg Technical School before working as a fitter and turner in a factory. Initially he wanted to be a blues guitarist: "I wanted to be like all the great blues guitar players, then I wanted to be like Bob Dylan, then of course... John Lennon." Anderson found himself in a band with three possible guitarists and "[t]he other two were much better than me, so the only other thing we needed was a singer... [we] had to sing 'Twist and Shout' without accompaniment. I just happened to be the best one at it."

From 1971 to 1973, Anderson led rock group Peace Power and Purity, and came to wider public notice as the lead vocalist with Buster Brown. He fronted the hard rock and blues rock band from its foundation in 1973; the original line-up included Phil Rudd on drums, who left in 1974 to join AC/DC. In 1975, Buster Brown released an album, Something to Say, on Mushroom Records/Festival Records before disbanding in November that year.

In 1976 in Sydney, Rose Tattoo was formed by Peter Wells of the heavy metal band Buffalo. Anderson had relocated to Sydney and replaced the group's original singer, Tony Lake. When their drummer Michael Vandersluys departed soon afterwards, he was replaced by Dallas Royall, who had been Rudd's replacement in Buster Brown. Their most popular single on the Australian Kent Music Report Singles Chart was "Bad Boy for Love" from 1977, which peaked at No. 19. Rose Tattoo's 1981 tour of Europe included an appearance at the Reading Festival, where Anderson repeatedly head-butted the amp stacks until his scalp started bleeding.

In 1983, Anderson's debut as an actor was a minor role in Bullamakanka. Later, he appeared as the character Ironbar Bassey in the film Mad Max Beyond Thunderdome (1985). Filmink magazine later wrote that Anderson "appeared in surprisingly few acting roles for someone with such renown as a presenter."

He joined as a guest vocalist with The Incredible Penguins, for a cover of "Happy Xmas (War Is Over)"; it was a charity project for research on little penguins, which peaked at No. 10 in December 1985. In 1987, he played Lenin in the musical Rasputin, composed by David Tyyd, at the State Theatre in Sydney.

Anderson led Rose Tattoo through five studio albums until disbanding the group in 1987, by which time he was the only member remaining from the early line-up. During 1986, as Rose Tattoo was winding down following the recording of Beats from a Single Drum, Anderson joined The Party Boys for an Australian tour, but never recorded with them. By this time Anderson had established himself as an advocate on social issues and made regular appearances on the Channel Nine programs The Midday Show with Ray Martin and then A Current Affair as a human interest reporter.

In 1987, Anderson had his biggest hit, when the uncharacteristic ballad "Suddenly" from the album Beats from a Single Drum was used as the wedding theme for the Neighbours episode in which the popular characters Scott Robinson and Charlene Mitchell married. Robinson was portrayed by Jason Donovan, while Mitchell's character was portrayed by pop singer Kylie Minogue, who had issued her debut single in July as a cover version of "Locomotion." "Locomotion" was at number one on the Australian charts, preventing "Suddenly" from reaching the top spot. Beats from a Single Drum had been planned as Anderson's debut solo release, but it had initially been billed as a Rose Tattoo album due to contractual obligations. After the success of "Suddenly", it was re-released in 1988 as an Angry Anderson solo album. In November 1988, the single reached number three on the UK singles chart after the episode aired there.

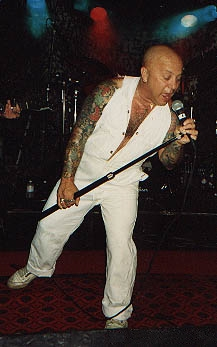
Anderson in Wagga, New South Wales, January 1993

With the dissolution of Rose Tattoo, Anderson pressed on with his solo career, releasing the album Blood from Stone in 1990, which provided the No. 11 hit single "Bound for Glory". He performed the song during half-time at the 1991 AFL Grand Final between Hawthorn and West Coast, after jumping out of a vehicle resembling the Batmobile. According to The Punch's Michael Phelan, Anderson's performance was "a teeth-gnashing, eyeballs-bleeding, nails-scratching-down-a-blackboard rendition" and rates it as the worst pre-game display in Australian sporting history. Fellow guest Robert de Castella believed Anderson struggled with Waverley Park's poor acoustics. Anderson himself claimed that he could not hear himself over the engine noise of the "Batmobile".

In 1992, Anderson acted in the Australian arena-style revival of Jesus Christ Superstar as Herod. On Australia Day (26 January) 1993, Anderson was made a Member of the Order of Australia with the citation, "In recognition of service to the community, particularly as a youth advocate." Also that year, Rose Tattoo reunited to support Guns N' Roses on the Australian leg of their Use Your Illusion Tour, Guns N' Roses specifically requested The Tatts to support them in Australia. However, the reunion was short-lived and the band's members returned to their solo projects.

From 1994, Anderson has used his contacts in the media to organise a Challenge where a particular charity's project was completed with support of community and business groups. Examples of these Challenges include constructing a playground for disabled children within 48 hours, assisting drought affected farmers with reserve feed for their stock, organising Christmas presents for socially and economically disadvantaged children, building two respite units for people living with and affected by HIV/AIDS and delivering artificial limbs for Cambodian land mine victims.

Rose Tattoo reconvened in 1998 and undertook an Australian tour. The group has continued to perform despite five Rose Tattoo former band members dying of cancer: Dallas Royall (1991), Peter Wells (2006), Ian Rilen (2006), Lobby Loyde (2007) and Mick Cocks (2009). According to rock music historian, Ian McFarlane, "over the course of a lengthy career, [the] gravel-throated vocalist ... has gone from attention-grabbing, rock'n'roll bad boy to all-round Australian media star." On 16 August 2006, Rose Tattoo were inducted into the Australian Recording Industry Association (ARIA) Hall of Fame.

In the early 2000s, Anderson participated in and organised a string of charity events. In 2002, Anderson played with former members of The Angels at the Bali Relief concert in Perth, Western Australia, held in aid of victims of the Bali bombing. Anderson was involved in the Dunn Lewis Youth Development Foundation, which is a lasting legacy of two of the 88 Australian lives lost in the bombings. In 2003, Anderson appeared in a cameo role as the character Kris Quaid in the independent Australian feature film Finding Joy. At the end of the film, he sings his hit "Suddenly."

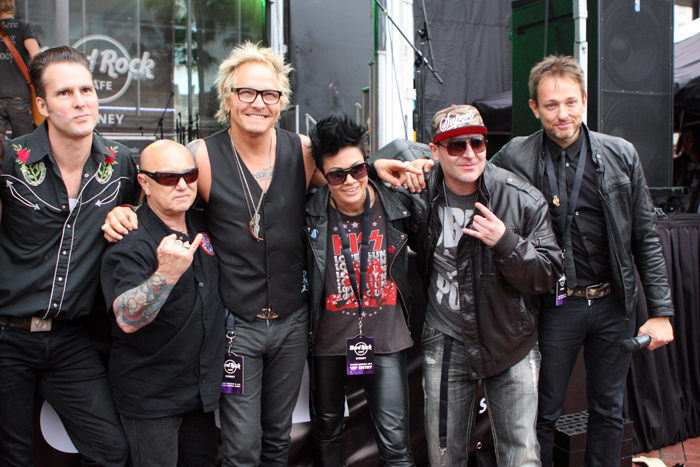
Left to right: Hamish Rosser, Anderson, Matt Sorum, Sarah McLeod, DJ Lethal at opening of Darling Harbour's Hard Rock Cafe in December 2011

Anderson appeared in a guest role in the Australian movie Suite for Fleur (2011), as Silas, Fleur's father, a carpenter and furniture maker living in Byron Bay. In December, Anderson joined Doc Neeson (The Angels), Mark Gable (The Choirboys), Buzz Bidstrup (The Angels), Phil Emmanuel and Matt Sorum (drummer for Guns N' Roses) on-stage to celebrate the opening of a Hard Rock Cafe in Darling Harbour. In January 2012, Anderson announced that Rose Tattoo would disband—he was a member of the National Party and considered using his birth name, Gary, for "political expediency" when running as a candidate in the next federal election.

In 2014, Anderson was featured on 7mate's successful television series Bogan Hunters as one of eight celebrity judges. Later that year, Anderson scored a role in the motion picture Fat Pizza vs. Housos. The film was shown in Australian cinemas from 27 November 2014 onwards.

== Political views ==
In July 2007, Anderson was criticised by some after espousing his views on Muslim immigration to Australia when he told the Sydney Daily Telegraph:

It's not ill-conceived to look at certain people and question when they come out here what they bring with them ... We have strict quarantine laws and it should be the same when it comes to cultures that do not want to integrate. We should be very careful about where certain Muslims come from and what they believe. If you come here, you should behave yourself—it's as simple as that... If people come and live in any country and their way of life is so different they need their own special laws, then possibly they have to pick somewhere else to live. The idea of any Muslim being photographed for a passport or a licence with one of those shrouds on—sorry, it just can't happen.

On 1 March 2010, he told a Federal Parliamentary Committee into the impact of violence on youth that life experience has taught him "Aussies use their fists" when they fight and that "weapons were introduced by other cultures." In March 2011, Anderson declared he was a supporter of conservative politician Tony Abbott and his views against a tax on carbon dioxide emissions. He announced in October that year that he was joining the conservative National Party, and was interested in standing for a seat in the next Australian federal election.

In January 2012, when asked whether his more 'leftie views' might be gagged (he supported same-sex marriage, for example) he replied, "maintaining some sort of order and balance is about agreement, compromise, setting rules as the head of the house. I've learnt to be a part of the family. So I'm not going to say things in public that are going to embarrass the party." He was selected as the National candidate for the Division of Throsby in New South Wales under his birth name, Gary Anderson. Although he did not win, his preferences helped the Coalition net a four-percent swing in the seat.

In 2012, Anderson participated in the SBS doco-reality show Go Back to Where You Came From, in which six Australians, each with differing opinions on Australia's asylum seeker debate, were taken on a journey which refugees have taken to reach Australia. At the outset of the series Anderson says that "boat people" who arrive in Australia illegally should be sent back to their countries of origin: "If you come here illegally, I don't care about your story, first thing you do is you turn around and go back."

Later in the series, after having met with refugees from Afghanistan who settled in Melbourne as well as visiting war-torn Kabul, Anderson softened his stand on the subject: "Now I've been here and spoken to people, I don't want to turn away refugees, I don't want to turn away people who need to be reunited with their families. I don't want that. Who would want that? I don't want people to go on suffering needlessly, when we can give them somewhere safe to be. But I don't want them to come to Australia in boats."

Again endorsed by the National Party in September 2014, this time in the New South Wales seat of Cessnock for the 2015 state election, Anderson withdrew his candidacy in February 2015, citing personal reasons.

In 2016, Anderson was endorsed as an Australian Liberty Alliance candidate for the Senate, representing New South Wales at the 2016 federal election. The Australian Liberty Alliance is a right-wing group that opposes Muslim immigration to Australia.

== Personal life and death ==
In the 1994 biography of Anderson, Angry – Scarred for Life, the author Karen Dewey describes his life as "Sexually, physically and mentally abused he broke the brutal family pattern to become a besotted, devoted father of four." Anderson described how "[t]here was physical and emotional violence in the family" and a family friend began sexually abusing him from the age of five.

In 1982, prior to one of Rose Tattoo's European tours, Anderson met Lindy Michael. Their daughter was born in 1983. Anderson and Michael married in January 1986 and also had three sons. In 2002, Anderson and Michael divorced. Anderson became a single father and lived in the Sydney suburb of Beacon Hill. On 4 November 2018, his son Liam was killed in an attack in a park.

Although he did not believe in an omniscient god, Anderson attended the Baha'i temple near Sydney regularly, saying that "the spirituality I have given myself over to is the divine". Having seen cancer cause the deaths of five of his Rose Tattoo bandmates, Anderson became an advocate for men's health. He appeared in a 2007 TV campaign promoting awareness of prostate cancer.

On 31 August 2026, Anderson was hospitalised in Germany following a cardiac arrest whilst Rose Tattoo were on a European tour. He died at his home in Sydney on 21 September 2026, at the age of 79.

== Discography ==
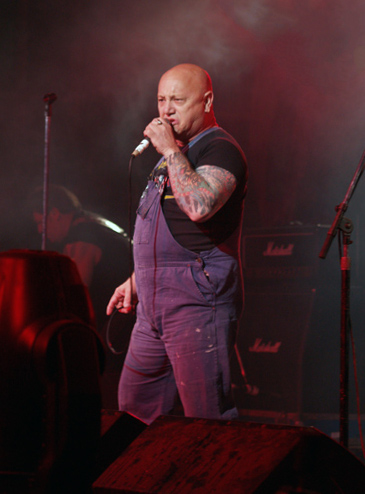
Anderson performing with Rose Tattoo at the 2006 Meredith Music Festival

=== Solo albums ===
List of albums, with selected chart positions
| Title | Album details | Peak chart positions |
| Title | Album details | AUS |
|---|---|---|
| Beats from a Single Drum | Released: 1987; Label: Mushroom Records (RML-53217); Format: CD, Cassette | 35 |
| Blood from Stone | Released: September 1990; Label: Mushroom Records (D 30252); Format: CD, Cassette | 35 |

=== Singles ===
List of singles as lead artist, with selected chart positions and certifications
| Title | Year | Peak chart positions | | | | Certifications | Album |
| Title | Year | AUS | IE | NL | UK | Certifications | Album |
|---|---|---|---|---|---|---|---|
| "Suddenly" | 1987 | 2 | 3 | 69 | 3 | BPI: Gold | Beats from a Single Drum |
| "Bound for Glory" | 1990 | 11 | — | — | — | | Blood from Stone |
| "Heaven" | 1990 | 102 | — | — | — | | Blood from Stone |
| "I've Got to Rock (To Stay Alive)" (Saxon featuring Lemmy Kilmister, Angry Anderson and Andi Deris) | 2007 | — | — | — | — | | Non-album single |

=== See also ===
- "You're Not Alone" (Australian Olympians song)

== Filmography ==
- At Last... Bullamakanka: The Motion Picture (1983) – Senator's Aide
- Mad Max Beyond Thunderdome (1985) – Ironbar Bassey
- Scuff the Sock (1987, TV movie) – Plasterer
- Finding Joy (2002) – Kris Quaid
- Fat Pizza (2003) – Bikie
- Pizza (2005, TV series) – Bikie Leader / Tattooist / Captain / Vietnam Vet
- Swift and Shift Couriers (2008–2011, TV series) – Aaron 'Agro' Smith
- Suite For Fleur (2011)
- Housos vs. Authority (2012) – Angry
- Go Back To Where You Came From (2012, TV series documentary) – Himself – Participant
- Housos (2011–2013; 2020, TV series) – Angry
- Fat Pizza vs. Housos (2014) – Angry
- Bogan Hunters (2014, TV series) – Himself – Celebrity Judge
- Dumb Criminals: The Movie (2015) – Angry
- Fat Pizza: Back in Business (2019–2021, TV series) – Angry
- Darradong Local Council (2023, TV series) – Patto

== Awards ==
=== Mo Awards ===
| Year | Nominee / work | Award | Result | Ref. |
|---|---|---|---|---|
| 1995 | Himself | John Campbell Fellowship Award | Won | |
