= Table of years in heavy metal music =

This a tabular display of all years in heavy metal music, to provide an overview and quick navigation to any year.

== 2000s in heavy metal music ==
2000 2001 2002 2003 2004 2005 2006 2007 2008 2009
2010 2011 2012 2013 2014 2015 2016 2017 2018 2019
2020 2021 2022 2023 2024 2025 2026

== 1900s in heavy metal music ==
1960s
1970 1971 1972 1973 1974 1975 1976 1977 1978 1979
1980 1981 1982 1983 1984 1985 1986 1987 1988 1989
1990 1991 1992 1993 1994 1995 1996 1997 1998 1999
