= 1972 in heavy metal music =

This is a timeline documenting the events of heavy metal music in the year 1972.

== Bands formed ==
- 10cc
- Beck, Bogert & Appice
- Bleak House
- Bonfire (as Cacumen)
- Frankenstein
- Geordie (featuring Brian Johnson on vocals)
- The Handsome Beasts
- Heavy Metal Kids (featuring Gary Holton on vocals)
- Jerusalem
- Magnum
- Mother's Finest
- Petra
- Poobah
- Pop Mašina
- Progresiv TM
- Resurrection Band
- Tarkus
- Tempest
- The Sensational Alex Harvey Band
- Styx
- The Tubes
- Twisted Sister (as Silver Star)
- Urchin
- Van Halen (as Genesis, later Mammoth)
- West, Bruce and Laing

== Bands reformed ==
- The Stooges

== Bands disbanded ==
- Cactus
- Creedence Clearwater Revival
- MC5 (reformed in 1974)
- Steppenwolf (reformed in 1974)
- The Jeff Beck Group
- Van der Graaf Generator (reformed in 1975)

== Albums ==
- Bang – Bang
- Night Sun – Mournin'
- Warpig – Warpig

=== January ===
Day	Artist	Album
	Blue Öyster Cult	Blue Öyster Cult
	Lucifer's Friend	...Where the Groupies Killed the Blues

=== February ===
Day	Artist	Album
9	Scorpions	Lonesome Crow
10	Flower Travellin' Band	Made in Japan

=== March ===
Day	Artist	Album
3	Jethro Tull	Thick as a Brick
10	Thin Lizzy	Shades of a Blue Orphanage
24	Jerusalem	Jerusalem
30	Deep Purple	Machine Head
	Humble Pie	Smokin'

=== April ===
Day	Artist	Album
4	ZZ Top	Rio Grande Mud
24	Mountain	Live: The Road Goes Ever On
28	Wishbone Ash	Argus

=== May ===
Day	Artist	Album
19	Uriah Heep	Demons & Wizards
31	James Gang	Straight Shooter

=== June ===
Day	Artist	Album
13	Alice Cooper	School's Out
16	Golden Earring	Together
	Buffalo	Dead Forever
	Tarkus	Tarkus

=== August ===
Day	Artist	Album
28	Cactus	'Ot 'n' Sweaty
	Elf	Elf

=== September ===
Day	Artist	Album
1	Budgie	Squawk
15	Grand Funk Railroad	Phoenix
22	Black Sabbath	Vol. 4

=== November ===
Day	Artist	Album
24	Hawkwind	Doremi Fasol Latido
	Bang	Mother / Bow to the King
	Uriah Heep	The Magician's Birthday

=== December ===
Day	Artist	Album
15	Status Quo	Piledriver
22	Deep Purple	Made in Japan

Preceded by 1971	Heavy Metal Timeline; 1972	Succeeded by 1973
