= 1973 in heavy metal music =

This is a timeline documenting the events of heavy metal in the year 1973.

== Bands formed ==
- AC/DC
- Ace Frehley
- Bachman-Turner Overdrive
- Bad Company
- Cheap Trick
- The Dictators
- Edda Művek
- Journey
- JPT Scare Band
- Kaipa
- Kansas
- Kiss
- Lazy
- Mass (as Black Mass)
- Max Webster
- Montrose
- Moxy
- Primevil
- Quiet Riot
- Stray Dog
- Vardis
- Vitacit
- Witchfynde

== Bands disbanded ==
- Flower Travellin' Band

== Events ==
- Rob Halford became the new vocalist for Judas Priest, taking over from Al Atkins who departed at the end of 1972. John Hinch also joined the band as their drummer.
- Tensions within Deep Purple led to vocalist Ian Gillan leaving and bassist Roger Glover being let go, marking the end of the band's Mark II era. They were replaced by David Coverdale and Glenn Hughes, respectively.
- Guitarist Michael Schenker left Scorpions and joined UFO, replacing Bernie Marsden.

== Deaths ==
- Helmut Eisenhut, drummer of Scorpions.

== Albums ==
=== January ===
Day	Artist	Album
5	Aerosmith	Aerosmith
12	Deep Purple	Who Do We Think We Are

=== February ===
Day	Artist	Album
7	Iggy and the Stooges	Raw Power
27	Alice Copper	Billion Dollar Babies
	Flower Travellin' Band	Make Up
	Blue Öyster Cult	Tyranny and Mutation

=== March ===
Day	Artist	Album
23	King Crimson	Larks' Tongues in Aspic
28	Led Zeppelin	Houses of the Holy

=== April ===
Day	Artist	Album
	Uriah Heep	Uriah Heep Live

=== May ===
Day	Artist	Album
11	Hawkwind	Space Ritual
11	Wishbone Ash	Wishbone Four
17	Bachman-Turner Overdrive	Bachman-Turner Overdrive
	Nazareth	Razamanaz
	Edgar Broughton Band	Oora

=== June ===
Day	Artist	Album
30	Budgie	Never Turn Your Back On a Friend
	Bang	Music

=== July ===
Day	Artist	Album
13	Jethro Tull	A Passion Play
13	Queen	Queen I
	Grand Funk Railroad	We're an American Band

=== August ===
Day	Artist	Album
13	Lynyrd Skynyrd	(Pronounced 'Lĕh-'nérd 'Skin-'nérd)
	Buffalo	Volcanic Rock
	Golden Earring	Moontan

=== September ===
Day	Artist	Album
3	Uriah Heep	Sweet Freedom
21	Thin Lizzy	Vagabonds of the Western World
	James Gang	Bang
	The Amboy Dukes	Call of the Wild

=== October ===
Day	Artist	Album
17	Montrose	Montrose
26	The Who	Quadrophenia

=== November ===
Day	Artist	Album
9	Nazareth	Loud 'n' Proud
16	The Kinks	Preservation: Act 1
20	Alice Cooper	Muscle of Love
30	Black Sabbath	Sabbath Bloody Sabbath
	Lucifer's Friend	I'm Just a Rock 'n' Roll Singer

December

Bachman-Turner Overdrive - Bachman–Turner Overdrive II

Preceded by 1972	Heavy Metal Timeline; 1973	Succeeded by 1974
