= 1971 in heavy metal music =

This is a timeline documenting the events of heavy metal in the year 1971.

== Bands formed ==
- Aquelarre
- Buffalo
- Bachman-Turner Overdrive
- Camel
- Captain Beyond
- Cirith Ungol
- Color Humano
- Eagles
- Foghat
- The Flying Hat Band
- GoodThunder
- Hard Stuff
- Jo Jo Gunne
- Manfred Mann's Earth Band
- Molly Hatchet
- New York Dolls
- Pentagram
- Pescado Rabioso
- Steely Dan
- White Witch

== Bands disbanded ==
- Blue Cheer (reformed in 1974)
- Derek and the Dominos
- Iron Butterfly (reformed in 1974)
- The Stooges

== Deaths ==
- October 29 – Howard Duane Allman, founder and guitarist of The Allman Brothers Band, died from injuries sustained in a motorcycle accident at the age of 24.

== Albums ==
- Sir Lord Baltimore – Sir Lord Baltimore

=== January ===
Day	Artist	Album
	Mountain	Nantucket Sleighride
	Uriah Heep	Salisbury
	ZZ Top	ZZ Top's First Album

=== February ===
Day	Artist	Album
24	Cactus	One Way... or Another

=== March ===
Day	Artist	Album
9	Alice Cooper	Love It to Death
19	Jethro Tull	Aqualung
26	Humble Pie	Rock On

=== April ===
Day	Artist	Album
5	Flower Travellin' Band	Satori
15	Grand Funk Railroad	Survival
30	Thin Lizzy	Thin Lizzy
	Blue Cheer	Oh! Pleasant Hope
	James Gang	Thirds
	Toad	Toad

=== May ===
Day	Artist	Album
	Edgar Broughton Band	Edgar Broughton Band

=== July ===
Day	Artist	Album
6	MC5	High Time
30	Budgie	Budgie
	Deep Purple	Fireball

=== August ===
Day	Artist	Album
2	The Who	Who's Next
6	Black Sabbath	Master of Reality
25	Blues Creation	Demon & Eleven Children
	Golden Earring	Seven Tears

=== September ===
Day	Artist	Album
21	T. Rex	Electric Warrior
	Uriah Heep	Look At Yourself

=== October ===
Day	Artist	Album
8	Hawkwind	In Search of Space
18	Cactus	Restrictions
	UFO	UFO 2: Flying

=== November ===
Day	Artist	Album
8	Led Zeppelin	Led Zeppelin IV
9	Alice Cooper	Killer
12	Nazareth	Nazareth
12	Van der Graaf Generator	Pawn Hearts
15	Grand Funk Railroad	E Pluribus Funk
19	Mott the Hoople	Brain Capers
	Mountain	Flowers of Evil
	Steppenwolf	For Ladies Only

=== December ===
Day	Artist	Album
3	King Crimson	Islands
3	ELO	The Electric Light Orchestra

Preceded by 1970	Heavy Metal Timeline; 1971	Succeeded by 1972
