= Rock Legends: Buffalo =

Compilation album by Buffalo
- Released: 1980
- Recorded: 1972–1976
- Studio: Various
- Genre: Hard rock
- Length: 42:12
- Label: PolyGram/Vertigo

Buffalo chronology
Average Rock 'n' Roller (1977)	Rock Legends: Buffalo (1980)	Skirt Lifters: Highlights & Oversights 1972-1976 (1989)

Rock Legends: Buffalo is a compilation album by Australian hard rock band Buffalo, issued in 1980 via PolyGram/Vertigo Records. Buffalo had been active from 1971 to 1977 and provided five studio albums, Dead Forever... (1972), Volcanic Rock (1973), Only Want You for Your Body (1974), Mother's Choice (1976) and Average Rock 'n' Roller (1977).

== Reception ==
Tracks compiled on Rock Legends: Buffalo were reviewed at I-94 Bar. Steve Danno-Lorkin described "Suzie Sunshine" as "a great piece of heavy melodic rock with some neat slide guitar from [Baxter]," while "Sunrise (Come My Way)" should "escalate the band to the worldwide stadiums", "Shylock", will "blow your head off with high-energy rifforama" and "Skirt Lifter" was "unlikely to be played on Catholic church-owned radio station 2SM."

== Track listing ==
All tracks are written by Dave Tice and John Baxter, unless otherwise noted

Rock Legends: Buffalo (1980) – PolyGram/Vertigo Records (6479 325)
No.	Title	Album	Length
1.	"Suzie Sunshine" (Peter Brett, Baxter)	Dead Forever...	2:53
2.	"Dead Forever"	Dead Forever...	5:32
3.	"Sunrise (Come My Way)"	Volcanic Rock	4:56
4.	"Skylock"	Volcanic Rock	5:54
5.	"Skirt Lifter^^"	Only Want You for Your Body	4:54
6.	"Just a Little Rock 'n' Roll&&" (Terry Thompson)	non-album single	2:21
7.	"What's Going On"	Only Want You for Your Body	4:58
8.	"Lucky" (Norm Roue)	Mother's Choice	3:24
9.	"Little Queenie" (Chuck Berry)	Mother's Choice	4:06
10.	"Sailor" (Tice, Jimmy Economou)	Average Rock 'n' Roller	4:50
11.	"Rollin'" (Colin Stead)	Average Rock 'n' Roller	3:18

- ^^track originally titled, "I'm a Skirt Lifter, not a Shirt Raiser"
- &&track originally titled "Just a Little Rock 'n' Roll (A Shot of Rhythm and Blues)"
