= 1975 in heavy metal music =

This is a timeline documenting the events of heavy metal in the year 1975.

== Bands formed ==
- Angel
- The Babys
- Boston
- Bow Wow
- Crack the Sky
- Goddo
- Harlequin
- Ian Gillan Band
- Iris
- Iron Maiden
- Jameson Raid
- Legs Diamond
- Lone Star
- Motörhead (as Bastard)
- Paris
- Prince
- Rainbow
- Quiet Riot
- Riot
- Saxon (as Son of a Bitch)
- Starz
- Ted Nugent
- The Runaways
- Triumph
- White Spirit
- White Wolf
- Zebra

== Bands reformed ==
- Van der Graaf Generator

== Bands disbanded ==
- Alice Cooper (band)
- Coven
- Elf
- Humble Pie
- The Guess Who
- Warpig

== Events ==
- Motörhead parted ways with original drummer Lucas Fox. He was replaced by Phil "Philthy Animal" Taylor.
- Ritchie Blackmore left Deep Purple due to dissatisfaction with the band's musical direction, marking the end of the band's Mark III era. He was replaced by Tommy Bolin.

== Deaths ==
- February 10 – David Michael "Dave" Alexander, original bassist of The Stooges, died from pulmonary edema at the age of 27.
- December 8 – Gary Mervin Thain, former Uriah Heep bassist, died from respiratory failure due to a heroin overdose at the age of 27.

== Albums ==
- Moxy – Moxy

=== January ===
Day	Artist	Album
	Iron Butterfly	Scorching Beauty

=== February ===
Day	Artist	Album
14	Rush	Fly By Night
17	AC/DC	High Voltage (Australia/New Zealand version)
24	Led Zeppelin	Physical Graffiti
28	Alice Cooper	Welcome to My Nightmare
	Humble Pie	Street Rats

=== March ===
Day	Artist	Album
19	Kiss	Dressed to Kill
24	Lynyrd Skynyrd	Nuthin' Fancy
28	Bad Company	Straight Shooter
	Golden Earring	Switch

=== April ===
Day	Artist	Album
1	Journey	Journey
8	Aerosmith	Toys in the Attic
	Nazareth	Hair of the Dog

=== May ===
Day	Artist	Album
5	James Gang	Newborn
9	Hawkwind	Warrior on the Edge of Time
	Bachman-Turner Overdrive	Four Wheel Drive

=== June ===
Day	Artist	Album
13	Uriah Heep	Return to Fantasy
	Elf	Trying to Burn the Sun

=== July ===
Day	Artist	Album
28	Black Sabbath	Sabotage
	UFO	Force It

=== September ===
Day	Artist	Album
5	Jethro Tull	Minstrel in the Gallery
5	Rainbow	Ritchie Blackmore's Rainbow
5	Budgie	Bandolier
10	Kiss	Alive!
12	Thin Lizzy	Fighting
17	Scorpions	In Trance
24	Rush	Caress of Steel
26	Montrose	Warner Bros. Presents Montrose!
	Ted Nugent	Ted Nugent

=== October ===
Day	Artist	Album
3	The Who	The Who by Numbers
	Van der Graaf Generator	Godbluff
	Iron Butterfly	Sun and Steel

=== November ===
Day	Artist	Album
7	Deep Purple	Come Taste the Band
28	Queen	A Night at the Opera

=== December ===
Day	Artist	Album
1	AC/DC	T.N.T.
	Bachman-Turner Overdrive	Head On

Preceded by 1974	Heavy Metal Timeline; 1975	Succeeded by 1976
