= 1970 in heavy metal music =

This is a timeline documenting the events of heavy metal in the year 1970.

== Bands formed ==
- A Foot in Coldwater
- Aerosmith
- Babe Ruth
- Bakery
- Bang
- Blackfeather
- Blast (Belgium)
- The Doobie Brothers
- Fuzzy Duck
- Heart
- Help
- Il Rovescio della Medaglia
- Irish Coffee
- Kahvas Jute
- Kin Ping Meh
- Load Control (Belgium)
- Lucifer's Friend
- Mahogany Rush
- Murasaki (Japan)
- Necromandus
- Night Sun
- Paladin
- Patto
- Queen
- Rail
- Road
- Speed, Glue & Shinki
- Suck
- T2
- Toad
- Warhorse

== Bands disbanded ==
- Jimi Hendrix Experience
- Vanilla Fudge

== Events ==
- In the November 12, 1970 issue of Rolling Stone magazine, music journalist Mike Saunders coined the term "heavy metal" while reviewing Humble Pie's debut album, As Safe as Yesterday Is.
- Vocalist Klaus Meine and guitarist Michael Schenker, younger brother of Rudolf Schenker, joined Scorpions.

== Deaths ==
- September 18 – James Marshall "Jimi" Hendrix died at the age of 27.

== Albums ==
=== January ===
Day	Artist	Album
15	MC5	Back in the USA
	The Guess Who	American Woman

=== February ===
Day	Artist	Album
13	Black Sabbath	Black Sabbath
	Van der Graaf Generator	The Least We Can Do Is Wave to Each Other

=== March ===
Day	Artist	Album
7	Mountain	Climbing!
25	Jimi Hendrix	Band of Gypsys
	Alice Cooper	Easy Action

=== April ===
Day	Artist	Album
22	Iron Butterfly	Live
24	Jethro Tull	Benefit
	Cream	Live Cream

=== May ===
Day	Artist	Album
11	The Who	Live at Leeds
15	King Crimson	In the Wake of Poseidon

=== June ===
Day	Artist	Album
5	Deep Purple	Deep Purple in Rock
15	Grand Funk Railroad	Closer to Home
19	Uriah Heep	Very 'eavy... Very 'umble
26	Free	Fire and Water
	Edgar Broughton Band	Sing Brother Sing
	Pretty Things	Parachute

=== July ===
Day	Artist	Album
1	Cactus	Cactus
7	The Stooges	Fun House
8	Creedence Clearwater Revival	Cosmo's Factory
	Humble Pie	Humble Pie
	James Gang	James Gang Rides Again

=== August ===
Day	Artist	Album
13	Iron Butterfly	Metamorphosis
14	Hawkwind	Hawkwind

=== September ===
Day	Artist	Album
18	Black Sabbath	Paranoid
	Blue Cheer	The Original Human Being

=== October ===
Day	Artist	Album
5	Led Zeppelin	Led Zeppelin III
21	Flower Travellin' Band	Anywhere
	UFO	UFO 1

=== November ===
Day	Artist	Album
16	Grand Funk Railroad	Live Album
27	The Kinks	Lola Versus Powerman and the Moneygoround, Part One
	Lucifer's Friend	Lucifer's Friend
	Slade	Play It Loud
	Steppenwolf	Steppenwolf 7

=== December ===
Day	Artist	Album
4	Wishbone Ash	Wishbone Ash
9	Creedence Clearwater Revival	Pendulum
11	King Crimson	Lizard
	Free	Highway
	Sir Lord Baltimore	Kingdom Come
	Van der Graaf Generator	H to He, Who Am the Only One

Preceded by 1969	Heavy Metal Timeline; 1970	Succeeded by 1971
