= Falcon (band) =

- Origin: California, United States
- Genres: Heavy metal, doom metal
- Years active: 2002–present
- Label: Liquid Flames Records
- Members: Perry Grayson; Greg Lindstrom; Darin McCloskey
- Website: falconband.net

Falcon is a California heavy metal band formed in 2002 by guitarist/vocalist Perry Grayson. Though active in the 2000s, Falcon's sound is throwback to the late 1960s and early 1970s, and they take their cue from luminaries like Blue Cheer, Black Sabbath, Trapeze, Budgie, Thin Lizzy, Pentagram, Mountain, Free, Bang, Captain Beyond and Buffalo.

== Career ==
Falcon's inception dates to 2002, when guitarist/singer and Metal Maniacs staff writer Perry Grayson (ex-Destiny's End, ex-Artisan, Isen Torr), pulled founding Cirith Ungol multi-instrumentalist Greg Lindstrom out of a two-decade musical retirement to play bass and keyboards (as well as additional lead guitar on recordings). Next, Grayson enlisted Pale Divine drummer Darin McCloskey Falcon recorded their self-titled debut album in 2003 at the Polar Bear Lair in Middletown, Maryland, with engineer Chris Kozlowski, best known for his work with The Melvins, Pentagram and Blue Cheer. Pentagram vocalist Bobby Liebling sang as a special guest on the song "On the Slab", Falcon's tribute to their hero, Phil Lynott of Thin Lizzy fame. In addition to some of Greg Lindstrom's old Cirith Ungol tunes, Falcon also included a cover of the Bang song "Redman". The self-titled Falcon album was released in 2004 on Cirith Ungol's original label, Liquid Flames Records. Over the next couple of years they played many successful gigs, followed in 2006 by the recording of their second album, Die Wontcha, the title of which is a play on West, Bruce and Laing's 1974 LP Why Dontcha. Perry Grayson joined Darin McCloskey in Pale Divine in 2005 for a tour of Europe. Although Grayson relocated to Australia in 2006, Falcon remains active with plans to release a third album and a collection of b-sides and rarities.

== Members ==
=== Current members ===
- Perry Grayson – lead vocals, guitar (2002–present)
- Greg Lindstrom – bass, keyboards, additional guitar (2002–present)
- Darin McCloskey – drums (2002–present)

=== Former members ===
- Andrew Sample – live drums (2003–2006)

== Discography ==
=== Studio ===
- Falcon (2004), Liquid Flames Records
- Die Wontcha (2008), Liquid Flames Records
- Heavy Rawkin' Rare (2026), Liquid Flames Records

=== Tribute albums ===
- "Shelob's Lair" (extended remix) – Cirith Ungol: One Foot in Fire (2005), Solemnity Music
