= War pigs =

War pigs are pigs speculated to have been used, rarely at most, in ancient warfare as a countermeasure to war elephants.

War pigs or variation, may also refer to:

== People ==
- Andy Warpigs, U.S. singer-songwriter
- Das Kampfschwein (German: The War Pig), nickname in English for Belgian soccer player and manager Marc Wilmots

== Music ==
- "War Pigs", a song by Black Sabbath from their 1970 album Paranoid
- War Pigs, original planned title of the 1970 album Paranoid by Black Sabbath
- Warpig (album), 1970 album by eponymous band Warpig
- Warpig (band), a Canadian band
- Warpigs (band), a Hungarian band

== Other uses ==
- War Pigs (film), a 2015 war film
- War Pig, a level in the video game Call of Duty 4: Modern Warfare

== See also ==
- Hogs of War (German: Frontschweine), a PlayStation game featuring the voice of Rik Mayall
- Pig War (disambiguation)
