= 1974 in heavy metal music =

This is a timeline documenting the events of heavy metal in the year 1974.

== Bands formed ==
- The Angels
- Baker Gurvitz Army
- Bijelo Dugme
- Eddie Money
- Drugi način
- George Thorogood and the Destroyers
- Helix
- Jefferson Starship
- Krokus
- Moxy
- Ñu
- Point Blank
- Praying Mantis
- Ramones
- Streetwalkers
- 38 Special
- Raven
- Stress
- Y&T

== Bands reformed ==
- Iron Butterfly
- MC5
- Steppenwolf

== Bands disbanded ==
- King Crimson
- The Stooges

== Events ==
- John Rutsey, one of the original members and the drummer of Rush, left the band due to health issues. Neil Peart was picked as his replacement.

== Deaths ==
- Hans-Joachim Rietenbach, drummer of Lucifer's Friend, died at the age of 25.

== Albums ==
- Lucifer's Friend – Banquet

=== February ===
Day	Artist	Album
15	Deep Purple	Burn
18	Kiss	KISS
	Humble Pie	Thunderbox
	Mountain	Twin Peaks

=== March ===
Day	Artist	Album
8	Queen	Queen II
15	Aerosmith	Get Your Wings
18	Rush	Rush
29	Grand Funk Railroad	Shinin' On
29	King Crimson	Starless and Bible Black
29	Mott the Hoople	The Hoople

=== April ===
Day	Artist	Album
5	Blue Öyster Cult	Secret Treaties
15	Lynyrd Skynyrd	Second Helping
26	Sweet	Sweet Fanny Adams
26	Nazareth	Rampant
	Elf	Carolina County Ball

=== May ===
Day	Artist	Album
17	Budgie	In for the Kill
24	Bad Company	Bad Company
	UFO	Phenomenon

=== June ===
Day	Artist	Album
	Buffalo	Only Want You for Your Body
	Uriah Heep	Wonderworld

=== July ===
Day	Artist	Album
	James Gang	Miami
	Mountain	Avalanche

=== August ===
Day	Artist	Album
30	Steppenwolf	Slow Flux
	Bachman-Turner Overdrive	Not Fragile

=== September ===
Day	Artist	Album
6	Hawkwind	Hall of the Mountain Grill
6	Judas Priest	Rocka Rolla

=== October ===
Day	Artist	Album
7	King Crimson	Red
11	Montrose	Paper Money
14	Jethro Tull	War Child
22	Kiss	Hotter Than Hell

=== November ===
Day	Artist	Album
1	Scorpions	Fly to the Rainbow
8	Queen	Sheer Heart Attack
8	Deep Purple	Stormbringer
8	Thin Lizzy	Nightlife
15	Sweet	Desolation Boulevard
	Wishbone Ash	There's the Rub

=== December ===
Day	Artist	Album
	Grand Funk Railroad	All the Girls in the World Beware!!!

Preceded by 1973	Heavy Metal Timeline; 1974	Succeeded by 1975
