= 1976 in heavy metal music =

This is a timeline documenting the events of heavy metal in the year 1976.

== Bands formed ==
- Accept
- Angel Witch (as Lucifer)
- Black Flag
- Bronz
- Chrome
- Citron
- Crys
- Diamond Head
- Ethel the Frog
- Foreigner
- Heavy Load
- Kick Axe
- Līvi
- Marseille
- McCoy
- Mentors
- The Obsessed
- Paice Ashton Lord
- Pat Travers
- Ratt
- Rose Tattoo
- Running Wild (as Granite Hearts)
- Sorcery
- Spider
- Sister
- The Clash
- The Godz
- Thor
- "Weird Al" Yankovic
- Zoetrope

== Bands disbanded ==
- Deep Purple (reformed in 1984)
- New York Dolls (reformed in 2004)
- Steppenwolf (reformed in 1980)

== Events ==
- "Fast" Eddie Clarke became the second guitarist for Motörhead. Shortly after his arrival, the original guitarist Larry Wallis departed, returning the band to a trio, which is now recognized as the "classic line-up".
- Uriah Heep parted ways with their original vocalist, David Byron, due to his struggles with heavy drinking.
- Guitarist Dave Murray joined Iron Maiden.

== Deaths ==
- December 4 – Thomas Richard "Tommy" Bolin, former guitarist of Zephyr, James Gang, and Deep Purple, died from an overdose of heroin and other substances, including alcohol, cocaine and barbiturates at the age of 25.

== Albums ==
- Lucifer's Friend – Mind Exploding
- Moxy – Moxy II
- Y&T – Yesterday & Today

=== January ===
Day	Artist	Album
14	Grand Funk Railroad	Born to Die
30	Bad Company	Run with the Pack
	Black Sabbath	We Sold Our Soul for Rock 'n' Roll
	Golden Earring	To the Hilt

=== February ===
Day	Artist	Album
2	Lynyrd Skynyrd	Gimme Back My Bullets
7	James Gang	Jesse Come Home
16	Sweet	Give Us a Wink

=== March ===
Day	Artist	Album
12	WIshbone Ash	Locked In
15	Kiss	Destroyer
24	Rush	2112
26	Judas Priest	Sad Wings of Destiny
26	Thin Lizzy	Jailbreak
31	Led Zeppelin	Presence
	Nazareth	Close Enough for Rock 'n' Roll
	Buffalo	Mother's Choice

=== April ===
Day	Artist	Album
16	Van der Graaf Generator	Still Life
23	Budgie	If I Were Britannia I'd Waive the Rules
23	Jethro Tull	Too Old to Rock 'n' Roll: Too Young to Die!
29	Krokus	Krokus

=== May ===
Day	Artist	Album
3	Aerosmith	Rocks
14	AC/DC	High Voltage (international version)
17	Rainbow	Rising
21	Blue Öyster Cult	Agents of Fortune
21	Uriah Heep	High and Mighty
	UFO	No Heavy Petting
	Sammy Hagar	Nine on a Ten Scale

=== June ===
Day	Artist	Album
25	Alice Cooper	Alice Cooper Goes to Hell

=== August ===
Day	Artist	Album
9	Grand Funk Railroad	Good Singin', Good Playin'
25	Boston	Boston
27	Hawkwind	Astounding Sounds, Amazing Music
	Taste	Tickle Your Fancy

=== September ===
Day	Artist	Album
20	AC/DC	Dirty Deeds Done Dirt Cheap
29	Rush	All the World's a Stage
	Montrose	Jump on It
	Ted Nugent	Free-for-All

=== October ===
Day	Artist	Album
8	Black Sabbath	Technical Ecstasy
22	Led Zeppelin	The Song Remains the Same
	Thin Lizzy	Johnny the Fox
	Styx	Crystal Ball
	Van der Graaf Generator	World Record
	Wishbone Ash	New England

=== November ===
Day	Artist	Album
11	Kiss	Rock and Roll Over
13	Nazareth	Play 'n' the Game
22	Scorpions	Virgin Killer
	Deep Purple	Made in Europe (live album)

=== December ===
Day	Artist	Album
10	Queen	A Day at the Races
	Bow Wow	吼えろ! バウワウ (Hoero! Bow Wow)

Preceded by 1975	Heavy Metal Timeline; 1976	Succeeded by 1977
