= Buffalo (EP) =

EP by Buffalo
- Released: 1974
- Recorded: 1972–1973
- Genre: Heavy metal
- Label: Phonogram/Vertigo
- Producer: Spencer Lee

Buffalo chronology
Volcanic Rock (1973)	Buffalo (1974)	Only Want You for Your Body (1974)

Buffalo is the four-track eponymous extended play by Australian rock band, Buffalo, originally released in 1974 on the Vertigo label. The line-up for the EP was Paul Balbi on drums, John Baxter on lead guitar, Jimmy Economou on drums, Alan Milano on vocals, Dave Tice on lead vocals, and Peter Wells on bass guitar. It compiled tracks from previous singles by the band. The EP has never been reissued after its original pressing, and is now considered a rare collectable. However, tracks from the EP appeared on remastered and reissued versions of Buffalo's studio albums, Dead Forever... and Volcanic Rock, via the Aztec Music label.

== Reception ==
Buffalo's tracks were re-visited by LouderSound's Geoff Barton when reviewing their career. "Suzie Sunshine" and "Dead Forever", showed Buffalo's "primordial potency still shines through. 'Suzie Sunshine',... and the title track have hooks so sharp they could snare a shiver of tiger sharks," "Sunrise Come My Way", "balances Tice’s gnawing holler with Baxter’s six-string savagery, all wrapped up in a pro-environment/anti-war message."

== Track listing ==
Buffalo (1974) – Phonogram/Vertigo (6237 001)

1. "Suzie Sunshine" (Peter Brett, John Alan Baxter) – 2:56
2. "Dead Forever" (Dave Tice, Baxter) – 5:32
3. "Barbershop Rock" (Baxter) – 3:24
4. "Sunrise Come My Way" (Tice, Baxter) – 3:44

== Personnel ==
- Paul Balbi – drums
- John Baxter – lead guitar
- Jimmy Economou – drums
- Alan Milano – vocals
- Dave Tice – lead vocals
- Peter Wells – bass guitar
