= Wytch Hazel =

British hard rock band

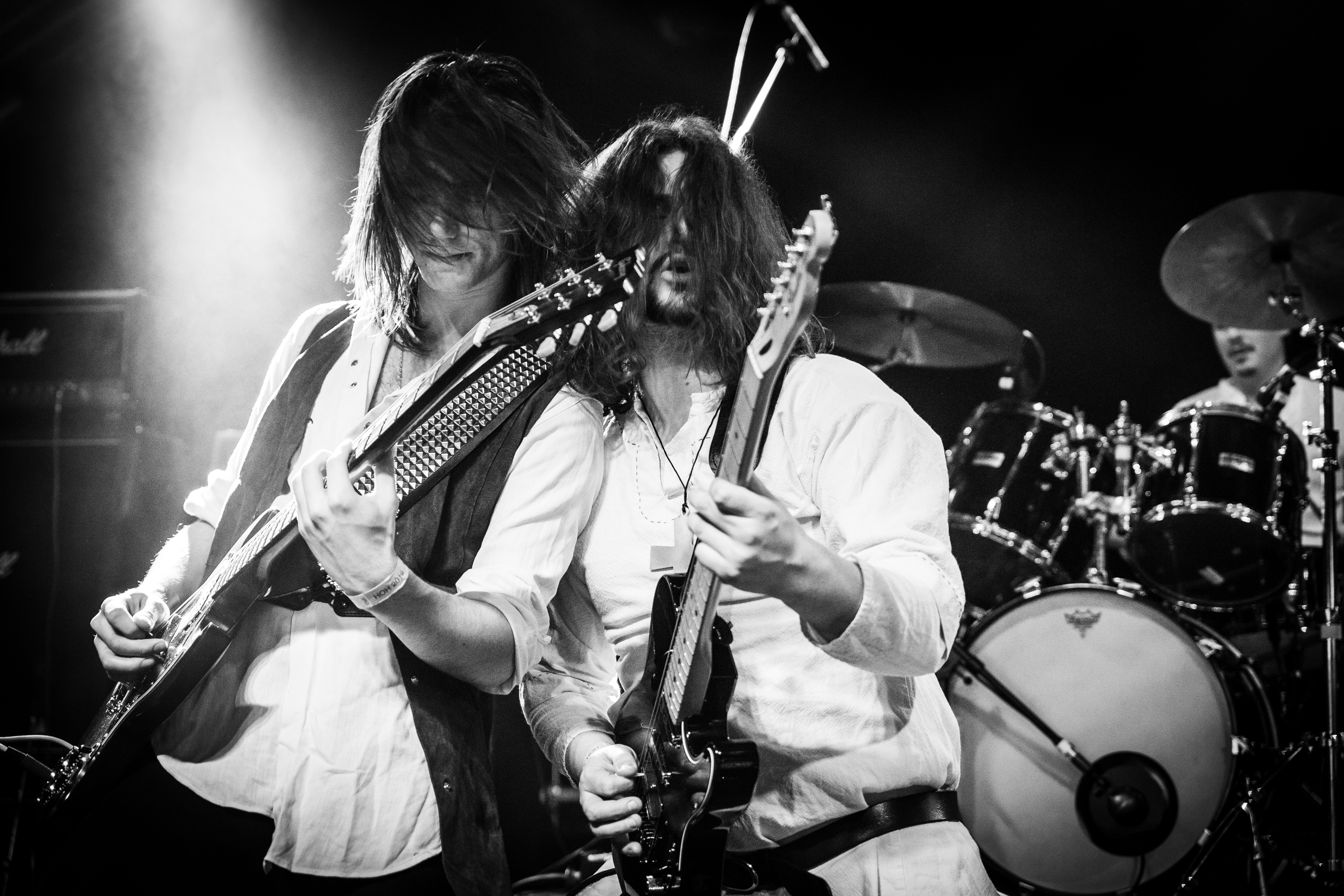
- Wytch Hazel performing at Hell Over Hammaburg in 2019

Background information
- Also known as: Jerusalem (2011–2012) <
- Origin: Lancaster, England
- Genres: Hard rock, heavy metal, Christian metal
- Years active: 2012–present
- Labels: Bad Omen, Prosthetic
- Members: Colin Hendra; Alex Haslam; Aaron Hay; Andrew Shackleton

Wytch Hazel are an English hard rock and heavy metal band from Lancaster, formed in 2011. They have released five studio albums.

== History ==
Wytch Hazel was formed in 2011. Originally, the band went with the name Jerusalem which had already been taken.Wytch Hazel began with the lineup of Colin Hendra on guitars and vocals, Josh Winnard on guitars, Cornelius Corkery on bass, and Aaron Hay on drums. In 2012, the band released their debut EP, titled The Truth, which came out independently. The band released two other split releases in 2012, one titled Vol. 1, which also featured Asmovel, Eliminator, and Ascalon, and Borrowed Time / Wytch Hazel, which featured Borrowed Time. By the time the band began to write and record their debut album, a majority of the lineup changed, with Hendra and Corkery remaining, with Winnard and Hay departing, as well as Winnard's replacement Matt Gatley, also departing by 2015. Alex Haslam joined the band in 2015 on guitars, with Jack Spencer taking over Hay's position in 2013. In 2016, the band released their debut album, titled Prelude, which was released through Bad Omen Records. In 2018, the band recorded and released their sophomore album, which was titled II: Sojourn, also being released through Bad Omen, and was well received. In 2020, the band released their third album, III: Pentecost, which was highly praised by several reviewers.

== Influences, style and beliefs ==
Founding member Colin Hendra states that Iron Maiden is one of the band's influences. Alex Haslam confirmed that other influences included Led Zeppelin, Wishbone Ash and Jethro Tull. Several reviewers compared the band to other artists like Blue Öyster Cult, Thin Lizzy, and Deep Purple.

While Wytch Hazel's lyrical content is very much oriented by themes of Christianity of lyrics, written by Hendra, they do not claim to be a Christian band. Hendra states that he is a Christian, Corkery is a Roman Catholic, and Winnard and Spencer are agnostics. The theme is very present in a majority of their songs, with many reviewers pointing this out.

== Members ==
Last known line-up

- Colin Hendra – vocals, guitar (2011–present)
- Alex Haslam – guitar (2015–present)
- Andrew Shackleton – bass (2019–present)
- Aaron Hay – drums (2011–2014, 2022-present)

Former

- Jack Spencer – drums (2014–2022)
- Josh Winnard – guitar, vocals (2011–2013)
- Matt Gatley – guitar (2013–2015)
- Cornelius "Neil" Corkery – bass (2011–2017)

Timeline

== Discography ==
Studio albums

- Prelude (2016)
- II: Sojourn (2018)
- III: Pentecost (2020)
- IV: Sacrament (2023)
- V: Lamentations (2025)

EPs

- The Truth (2012)
- Strong Heart (2023)

Splits

- Vol. 1 (2012)
- Borrowed Time / Wytch Hazel (2012)

Compilations

- Surrender & the Truth (2013)
