= Demon & Eleven Children =

1971 studio album by Blues Creation

Studio album by Blues Creation
- Released: August 25, 1971
- Genres: Acid rock; blues rock; proto-metal
- Label: Denon

Blues Creation chronology
The Blues Creation (1969)	Demon & Eleven Children (1971)	Carmen Maki/Blues Creation (1971)

Demon & Eleven Children (Japanese: 悪魔と11人の子供達, Hepburn: Akuma to 11-nin no Kodomotachi) is the second studio album by Japanese rock band Blues Creation. Their first album of original material, it was released by Denon on August 25, 1971, simultaneously with Carmen Maki/Blues Creation; their collaborative album with female singer Carmen Maki. Demon & Eleven Children has been credited with pioneering Japanese rock, and achieved "legendary status" decades later due to being regarded as a proto-metal record.

== Overview ==
Following the October 1969 release of their self-titled debut album, Blues Creation went through a number of lineup changes, including the departures of vocalist Fumio Nunoya and drummer Shinichi Tashiro. Tashiro introduced the band to his replacement, Masayuki Higuchi, in late 1970 or early 1971. Guitarist and bandleader Kazuo Takeda said it was at this time that the band gradually changed from authentic Chicago blues to a more blues rock style and is when he started writing original songs.

Now with Hiromi Ohsawa on vocals and Masashi Saeki on bass, Blues Creation signed to Nippon Columbia's Denon label, and was given a lot of freedom to record from their producer Kuroda. For the Demon & Eleven Children recording sessions, Takeda used a 1967 Epiphone Riviera and a modified 100-watt Guyatone amplifier. Tomoyuki Hokari of OK Music noted how the titles of "Atomic Bombs Away" ("atomic drop") and "Brane Baster" ("brainbuster") were derived from Takeda's love of professional wrestling. When asked about the meaning behind the album title, the guitarist said, "I have absolutely no idea. Sorry. Perhaps it's something the record company suggested or maybe some other band member came up with this weird title." A week after finishing their second album, Blues Creation returned to the studio to record a collaborative album with female singer Carmen Maki.

Both Demon & Eleven Children and Carmen Maki/Blues Creation were released simultaneously on August 25, 1971. The band was not happy with the cover art for Demon & Eleven Children, but later explained there was no time to complain and ask for a change. In contrast, Takeda felt the record company did a great job with the cover for Carmen Maki/Blues Creation. Takeda said the band played many gigs between 1970 and 1971; "We were playing outdoor rock festivals which were getting popular in Japan. Blues Creation was booked for a rock festival almost every week. It seems like we were in the middle of that movement." Maki would join them on stage for a few songs as a guest. However, this schedule caused the members to become burned out, and the band disbanded at the end of the year.

== Reception ==
Professional ratings
Review scores
Source	Rating
AllMusic	4.5/5 stars

AllMusic's Eduardo Rivadavia gave Demon & Eleven Children a near-perfect 4.5 out of 5 rating. He wrote that among the "endless sequence of Godzilla-esque power chords and elephantine feedback" of the album's epic title track and the "acid-trip apocalypse" that is "Atomic Bombs Away", one finds relative variety in the "token blues-rocker" "Mississippi Mountain Blues", the extended jazz and blues improvisations of the "mostly mellower" "Sorrow", and the "lysergic dreamscape" of "One Summer Day". Rivadavia also remarked how the album achieved "legendary status" decades after its release for its "primal, proto-metallic acid rock". He ended his review by opining, that only geographical isolation stopped Demon & Eleven Children from turning Blues Creation into a major concern overseas on par with Led Zeppelin, Deep Purple, and Black Sabbath.

Tomoyuki Hokari of OK Music called Demon & Eleven Children one of the most important works in the history of Japanese rock, which it laid the foundation for. He wrote that it showcases the overwhelming ability of "super guitarist" Kazuo Takeda, with material on par with what Black Sabbath and Led Zeppelin were doing at the same time, yet clearly has unique elements that would not have existed in the West. Hokari also noted how the album's legacy once saw complete original pressings of the album sell for ¥100,000.

Musician and author Julian Cope included Demon & Eleven Children at number 17 on his list of the top 50 albums of Japanese rock, as found in his 2007 book Japrocksampler. Composed of eight songs that he found both complex and "supremely individual", Cope called the album a proto-metal classic that feels like the Yardbirds meets Black Sabbath's debut album.

When asked to reflect on Demon & Eleven Children in 2006, Takeda said, "to tell you the truth, I feel a little embarrassed about it and it's hard for me to listen to it today since it was done so long ago, I was really young (19 years old) and it's so innocent."

== Track listing ==
All tracks are written by Kazuo Takeda.

Side 1
No.	Title	Length
1.	"Atomic Bombs Away" (原爆落し)	5:29
2.	"Mississippi Mountain Blues" (ミシシッピー・マウンテン・ブルース)	4:06
3.	"Just I Was Born" (ジャスト・アイ・ワズ・ボーン)	6:17
4.	"Sorrow" (悲しみ)	7:27

Side 2
No.	Title	Length
1.	"One Summer Day" (ワン・サマー・デイ)	2:22
2.	"Brane Baster" (脳天杭打ち)	2:02
3.	"Sooner or Later" (スーナー・オア・レイタ)	5:13
4.	"Demon & Eleven Children" (悪魔と11人の子供達)	9:15

== Personnel ==
Blues Creation

- Kazuo Takeda – electric guitar, vocals
- Hiromi Ohsawa – vocals
- Masashi Saeki – electric bass
- Masayuki Higuchi – drums
