= Pig War =

Pig War may refer to the following conflicts:

- Saukrieg ("Pig War") 1555–58 feud between the Bishop of Meissen and the family of his predecessor
- Pig War (1859), a largely bloodless border confrontation between the United States and the British Colony of Vancouver Island
- Pork war of 1880s, European nations embargo of US pork export
- Pig War (1906–1908), a trade war between the Austro-Hungarian Empire and the Kingdom of Serbia
- The Pig War (poem), a Latin poem
- "The Pig War", an episode of Hey, Arnold! loosely inspired by the American-British war on Vancouver Island

== See also ==
- War pigs (disambiguation)
