= Sir Lord Baltimore III Raw =

Studio album by Sir Lord Baltimore
- Released: July 2006
- Genre: Hard rock; heavy metal
- Length: 28:00
- Label: JG Records

Sir Lord Baltimore chronology
Sir Lord Baltimore (1971)	Sir Lord Baltimore III Raw (2006)

Professional ratings
Review scores
Source	Rating
AllMusic	3.5/5 stars

Sir Lord Baltimore III Raw is the third and final studio album by American heavy metal band Sir Lord Baltimore, released in July 2006 on JG Records.

Over 30 years after the band's original breakup, lead vocalist/drummer John Garner and guitarist Louis Dambra reunited to record and self-distribute this album, with Garner producing. Original bass player Gary Justin did not participate, and the majority of the album's bass guitar work was performed by Tony Franklin, with guitarist Anthony Guido and bass player Sam Powell being credited as guest musicians.

Although the album's music was originally written for an aborted 1976 release, the lyrics were changed to present a Christian viewpoint not found on Sir Lord Baltimore's 1970s recordings. Sir Lord Baltimore III Raw was only available via mail order, and has not been released in brick-and-mortar or online stores. However, in February 2007, Garner indicated that he and Dambra were seeking a traditional distributor for the album.

== Track listing ==
1. "(Gonna) Fill the World with Fire" – 3:39
2. "Love Slave" – 3:42
3. "Wild White Horses" – 7:00
4. "Rising Son" – 4:44
5. "Cosmic Voice" – 3:58
6. "Mission" – 4:57

== Personnel ==
- John Garner – vocals, drums
- Louis Dambra – guitar
- Anthony Guido - guitar (track 6)
- Tony Franklin – bass
- Sam Powell – bass (tracks 5 and 6)
