= Average Rock 'n' Roller =

Studio album by Buffalo
- Released: June 1977
- Recorded: Armstrong Studios and Trafalgar Studios, Sydney, 1976
- Genre: Hard rock
- Label: Vertigo; Aztec Music
- Producer: Buffalo

Buffalo chronology
Mother's Choice (1976)	Average Rock 'n' Roller (1977)	Rock Legends: Buffalo (1980)

Professional ratings
Review scores
Source	Rating
Allmusic	2/5 stars
I-94 Bar	3/5 stars

Average Rock 'n' Roller is the fifth and final studio album for Australian rock band Buffalo, recorded in 1976 and originally released in 1977 on the Vertigo label. The album was remastered and reissued in December 2006 by Australian record label Aztec Music on CD with additional tracks – which are solo recordings by vocalist Dave Tice, originally released as a single during 1976.

== Track listing ==
1. "You Say" (Tice, Turner, Sims, Economou) – 4:58
2. "Rollin'" (Colin Stead) – 3:20
3. "Average Rock 'n' Roller" (Turner) – 3:25
4. "Hotel Ladies" (Turner, Tice, Stead) – 5:27
5. "Bad News" (Turner) – 3:18
6. "Sailor" (Tice, Economou) – 4:53
7. "Rhythm Madness" (Turner, Tice, Economou) – 3:34
8. "Hero Suite" – 8:14
  - "(I) Lend Me Your Ears" (Turner)
  - "(II) Crying Out for Help" (Turner)
  - "(III) Between the Line" (Turner, Sims)
9. "I Don't Want to Spoil the Party" (Lennon, McCartney) – (cover)*
10. "Sweet Little Rock 'n' Roller" (Roberto Danova)*

* Bonus tracks on the 2006 Aztec Music reissue

== Personnel ==
- Dave Tice – lead vocals, harmonica
- Chris Turner – guitars, backing vocals
- Ross Sims – bass
- Jimmy Economou – drums, backing vocals
- Peter Wells – bass (track 2), piano (track 4), dobro (track 6)
- Mark Simmonds – saxophone (track 3)
- Shirley Reed – backing vocals (tracks 2 & 5)
- Penny Dyer – backing vocals (tracks 2 & 5)
