= Return to Fantasy (song) =

Single by Uriah Heep

from the album Return to Fantasy
- B-side: "The Time Will Come"
- Released: July 1975
- Recorded: May 1975
- Length: 5:52
- Label: Bronze
- Songwriters: Ken Hensley, David Byron
- Producer: Gerry Bron

Uriah Heep singles chronology
"Prima Donna" (1975)	"Return to Fantasy" (1975)	"One Way or Another" (1976)

"Return to Fantasy" is a song by British rock band Uriah Heep from their eighth studio album Return to Fantasy (1975). The song was written by David Byron and Ken Hensley and was the last single by the group to feature David Byron on lead vocals. The song was recorded in May 1975 in London in the Lansdowne and Morgan studios.

== Covers ==
The song has been covered by German power metal band Gamma Ray on their studio album, Somewhere Out in Space, as the bonus track in Japan release.

== Personnel ==
- David Byron – vocals
- Mick Box – guitars
- Ken Hensley – keyboards
- Lee Kerslake – drums
- John Wetton – bass guitar
