= Creation (Japanese band) =

Japanese rock band

- Also known as: Blues Creation
- Origin: Tokyo, Japan
- Genres: Hard rock; blues rock; psychedelic rock
- Years active: 1969–1972; 1972–1984; 2005–present
- Labels: Polydor; Denon; Express; A&M; Eastworld; King; Ivy
- Members: Kazuo Takeda
- Past members: Fumio Nunoya; Koh Eiryu; Shinichi Tashiro; Yoshiyuki Noji; Hiromi Ohsawa; Jun Shinozaki; Mamoru Shimura; Norio Uemura; Takashi Yamazaki; Masashi Saeki; Masayuki Higuchi; Felix Pappalardi; Yuji Tochihara; Tetsu Yamauchi; Ryo Okumoto; Takashi Takagi; Kazuo Shinoda; Toru Minagawa; Yukinao Sano; Blue Barron; Jun Ando; Ritsuo Kamimura; Ai Takano; Yoshiaki Iijima; Shigeru Matsumoto; Masami Naito; Tengai Hai
- Website: eliotnescafe.wixsite.com/creation-web

Creation (Japanese: クリエイション, Hepburn: Kurieishon) is a Japanese rock band led by guitarist/singer Kazuo Takeda. Formed as Blues Creation (ブルース・クリエイション, Burūsu Kurieishon) in Tokyo in January 1969, they were the country's first blues band before adopting a more blues rock sound in 1971. That year, they simultaneously released the albums Demon & Eleven Children and Carmen Maki/Blues Creation, the latter being a collaboration with female vocalist Carmen Maki. Both albums have been credited with pioneering Japanese rock. After briefly disbanding, the band returned as simply Creation in 1972. They continued to tour, including becoming the first Japanese band to tour the United States and the first Japanese rock band to play the Nippon Budokan, and produce albums until disbanding in 1984. Since 2005, Takeda periodically returns to Japan and performs with musicians as Creation.

== History ==
=== Blues Creation (1969–1972) ===
Blues Creation was formed in January 1969 by guitarists Kazuo Takeda and Koh Eiryu and singer Fumio Nunoya following the dissolution of their group sounds band The Bickies (ザ・ビッキーズ). Its early lineup was fluid, with musicians coming and going. Takeda said the band was formed to fulfill his desire to play nothing but blues, and as such, has proclaimed that they were the first Japanese blues band. However, he would later acknowledge that they were not very strict on sticking to the genre. Takeda wanted the band's name to have the word "blues" in it, and to not have an "s" at the end like most groups of the time. "Creation" was chosen simply because he liked the sound of the word. With most members just 16- or 17-years-old, Blues Creation took a train to Hachinohe on January 1, 1969, to conduct their first, month-long tour. Hiromi Ohsawa was the vocalist at this time.

Although general Japanese audiences did not listen to the blues, Blues Creation gained some respect from people in the music industry after they started gigging in Shinjuku. After seeing them play live, the producer of The Tigers signed them to Polydor Records and they began recording their first album after only three months together as a band. Takeda said that Japanese record labels at the time were searching for something new; "A band that would play a new type of music and we were there. We were at the right time, at the right place with enough [mystique] around us and the label decided to give it a go." Blues Creation released their self-titled debut album in October 1969. Choosing songs that Nunoya could sing well, it consists entirely of American blues covers, including "Checkin' Up on My Baby", "Smokestack Lightnin'", "Spoonful" and "All Your Love". Takeda estimated that it was recorded in only two days, around 16 hours in total. After its release, the band went through a number of lineup changes, including the departures of Nunoya and drummer Shinichi Tashiro. Nunoya later said, "We couldn't really play! (laughs) I wanted to do stuff that was more out there", and went on to form a band called Dew. The vocalist position was filled by the return of Ohsawa. After Tashiro introduced the band to his replacement, Masayuki Higuchi, in late 1970 or early 1971, the band gradually changed to a more blues rock style and Takeda started writing original songs.

With Masashi Saeki on bass, Blues Creation signed to Nippon Columbia's Denon label, and Takeda said their producer gave them a lot of freedom to record. August 1971 saw the simultaneous release of Demon & Eleven Children and Carmen Maki/Blues Creation. Recorded in immediate succession, the former is the band's first album of original material and the latter is a collaboration with female vocalist Carmen Maki. According to Takeda, former folk singer Maki had gotten to know Blues Creation in early 1971, and when her record contract expired, every major record label was trying to sign her, but she turned them all down in order to play rock music. Nippon Columbia was one of these desperate to sign the singer, so Takeda and company picked material from Maki's daily listening records and wrote some original songs for her. Tomoyuki Hokari of OK Music has cited both Demon & Eleven Children and Carmen Maki/Blues Creation as having laid the foundation for Japanese rock. AllMusic's Eduardo Rivadavia writes that the former album achieved "legendary status" decades later for its "primal, proto-metallic acid rock". Takeda said that Blues Creation played so many gigs and rock festivals between 1970 and 1971, that everyone in the band was burned out by the summer of 1971. They disbanded at the end of the year. Higuchi quickly formed the band Oz with Maki. Takeda formed the very short-lived power trio Bloody Circus with bassist Shigeru Matsumoto and drummer Masami Naito (who later joined Carmen Maki & Oz in 1975), before he and Matsumoto moved to London, England.

=== Creation (1972–1984, 2005–present) ===
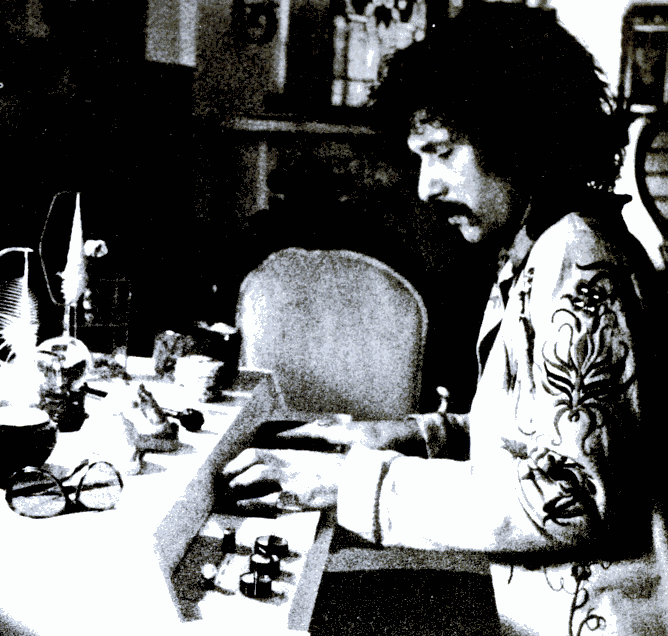
Creation collaborated with Felix Pappalardi from 1975 to 1976.

Takeda returned to Japan after about six months, and regrouped with Matsumoto, Higuchi and Ohsawa in 1972. No longer sticking to one genre, but also not wanting to start from scratch, they dropped "Blues" from the name and called their new group simply "Creation". When Ohsawa left in 1973, Takeda took over lead vocal duties and Yoshiaki Iijima joined as second guitarist. They continuously played and wrote material for three years, including working as Yuya Uchida's backing band. Their self-titled album was released in 1975, with Uchida producing and a cover photo of a dozen nude boys full-frontal urinating. After having opened for his band Mountain in 1973 and playing with him at a 1975 festival, Takeda befriended American bassist Felix Pappalardi. Pappalardi ended up helping Creation with their second album and invited them to his Nantucket, Massachusetts home, where they recorded together at New York's Bearsville Studios. Pappalardi became a lead singer of the band, with songs being written mostly by him, his wife Gail Collins Pappalardi and Takeda. The resulting album, Creation/Felix Pappalardi, was released in April 1976, and together they toured the US. The concerts included acts such as Kiss, Yes and Johnny Winter, while the following year's tour of Australia featured Fleetwood Mac and Santana. That year they also became the first Japanese rock band to hold a solo concert at the Nippon Budokan.

Splitting with Pappalardi, Creation released the Uchida-produced album Pure Electric Soul in 1977, once again featuring a cover with nude boys, this time at the front of a bus. It was ranked number 62 on Rolling Stone Japan's 2007 list of the greatest Japanese rock albums of all time, while its song "Spinning Toe-Hold" was named the 37th best guitar instrumental by Young Guitar Magazine in 2019. A lifelong fan of professional wrestling, Takeda titled the song after the signature move of Dory Funk Jr., whom he was a fan of. Dory and his brother Terry went on to use the song as their entrance music.

In 1980, the Creation lineup was overhauled, with Ai Takano joining as lead vocalist. Their fifth album, The Land of the Rising Sun, was released that May. The band's April 1981 single "Lonely Heart" was used as the ending theme song of the TV show Pro Hunter and became a nationwide hit, reaching number 8 on the Oricon Singles Chart, selling nearly 380,000 copies in 29 weeks, and earning the group appearances on shows such as The Best Ten. It was also the first release where their name was spelled "クリエーション" in Japanese. Takeda explained that the president of their production company was into onomancy and said the different spelling would sell better. Although he does not believe in such things, Takeda said he could not resist when the single actually became a hit. After 12 years, Creation ended activities in October 1984. Takeda later said he simply wanted to try something new with a new band, which was Takeda Kazuo & Boys on Rocks, active from 1987 to 1991.

Kazuo Takeda has released many solo albums and works as a session guitarist in Los Angeles after moving there in March 1997. He attributes his further musical development to his friendship with Pappalardi who encouraged him to branch out into jazz and other styles. In 2002, he began producing albums for Hong Kong bluesman Tommy Chung. Takeda resumed activities as Creation at the Crossover Japan event at Yoyogi National Gymnasium in 2005. In 2008, Blues Creation reunited for a one-night only concert at JCB Hall in Tokyo. Creation released Resurrection, its first album in 30 years, in 2014. As of 2023, Takeda returns to Japan twice a year, in the spring and the fall, to perform with Creation and his solo band Flash Kaz & The Comets. Similar to the early days of Blues Creation, former members and guest studio musicians who played on their albums rotate in and out of Creation.

== Discography ==
=== Blues Creation ===
- The Blues Creation (1969)
- Demon & Eleven Children (1971)
- Carmen Maki/Blues Creation (1971) – Carmen Maki/Blues Creation
- Hakunetsu no Blues Creation Live! (白熱のブルースクリエイション Live!; 1989, live album)
- In the Beginnings (2005, live album)

=== Creation ===
- Creation (1975)
- Creation/Felix Pappalardi (1976) – Creation/Felix Pappalardi
- Pure Electric Soul (1977)
- The Super Best (1978, compilation album)
- Super Rock in the Highest Voltage (スーパー・ロック, Sūpā Rokku; 1978)
- Studio Live! (1979, live album)
- Creation Greatest Hits (1979, compilation album)
- The Land of the Rising Sun (朝日の国, Asahi no Kuni; 1980)
- Lonely Heart (1981)
- Rock City (1981, compilation album)
- Just Arrive (1982)
- Just Alive (1982, live album)
- Running On (1982)
- Songs for a Friend (1983) – Kazuo Takeda & Creation
- Rainy Nite Dreamer (1984) – Kazuo Takeda & Creation
- Best of (1989, compilation album)
- Creation with Felix Pappalardi Live at Budokan 1976 (2007, live album) – Creation with Felix Pappalardi
- Resurrection (2014)
- 1974 One Step Festival (2018, live album) – Creation+Yuya Uchida
