= Ai Takano =

Ai Takano (アイ高野, Takano Ai)
- Born: Motonari Takano (高野 元成, Takano Motonari); January 12, 1951
- Origin: Tokyo, Japan
- Died: April 1, 2006 (aged 55)
- Genres: Anison, rock
- Occupation: vocalist
- Instruments: vocals, drums
- Years active: 1966-2006
- Label: King Records
- Formerly of: The Golden Cups, Creation

Motonari Takano (Japanese: 高野 元成, Hepburn: Takano Motonari; January 12, 1951 - April 1, 2006), better known as Ai Takano (アイ高野, Ai Takano) and nicknamed Motchin, was a Japanese singer. He is best known for his performances of the theme songs for the anime Galactic Whirlwind Sasuraiger, Pettonton, and Kyojuu Tokusou Juspion. Takano also sung the songs in Ai Shite Knight for the fictional in-story band, Bee Hive, even though the singer character, Gou, is voiced by singer Isao Sasaki. Before starting his anisong career, Takano was drummer of The Golden Cups and a vocalist of Creation.

== Career and bands ==
Takano was a part of several bands as well as having a successful solo career. He first joined the band The Carnabeats (ザ・カーナビーツ, Za Kānabītsu) in 1967, where he served as the band's singer and drummer. Their debut single was a cover of The Zombies's song "I Love You" and renamed "Suki Sa Suki Sa Suki Sa" (好きさ好きさ好きさ). The song was translated into Japanese by Ren Kenji. The band put out 10 singles and 2 albums before disbanding in 1969. In 1970, Takano joined the rock band The Golden Cups as their drummer. The band dissolved in 1972, having their last performance on January 1. Takano was featured on 2 singles and 2 albums for The Golden Cups. In the early 1980s, Takano was a vocalist of Creation and also began his anisong solo career.

== Albums ==
=== With the Carna Beats ===
- Jaguars vs. Carna Beats (split album with The Jaguars) (August 1, 1967)
- The Carna Beats First Album (February 16, 1968)

=== With The Golden Cups ===
- The Fifth Generation The Golden Cups Album 8 (January 10, 1971)
- Live!! Golden Cups (October 5, 1971)

== Songs for Ai Shite Knight ==
Songs were released on the album Debut Bee Hive in Japan in June 1983.

- Rockin' all night
- Fire
- Midnight Rock'n'Roll Star
- Lonely Boy
- Baby, I Love You
- Freeway
- Someday on Sunday
- Love Again
