= Return to Fantasy =

Studio album by Uriah Heep
- Released: 13 June 1975
- Recorded: Spring 1975
- Studios: Lansdowne and Morgan, London
- Genres: Hard rock; progressive rock; heavy metal
- Length: 40:35
- Label: Bronze
- Producer: Gerry Bron

Uriah Heep chronology
Wonderworld (1974)	Return to Fantasy (1975)	High and Mighty (1976)

Singles from Return to Fantasy
- 1. "Prima Donna" Released: June 1975; 2. "Return to Fantasy" Released: July 1975 (Europe and Japan)

Return to Fantasy is the eighth studio album by English rock band Uriah Heep, released on 13 June 1975 by Bronze Records in the UK and Warner Bros. Records in the US. It was the first of the two albums to feature John Wetton, known for his previous work with King Crimson, Roxy Music and later Wishbone Ash, as the new bass player, who replaced Gary Thain in early 1975.

The sleeve-art is by British artist Dave Field.

== Reception ==
Professional ratings
Review scores
Source	Rating
AllMusic	3/5 stars
Collector's Guide to Heavy Metal	5/10

Return to Fantasy "retains the musical experimentation that marked Sweet Freedom and Wonderworld, but has an overall harder-rocking feel that makes it more consistent than either one of those albums", said Donald A. Guarisco in his retrospective AllMusic review. He criticised some of the album's "genre-hopping", and concluded, "In the end, Return to Fantasy lacks the coherence of a top-shelf Uriah Heep classic like Demons and Wizards but remains a strong and likable album that is guaranteed to please the group's fans". The review by Canadian journalist Martin Popoff was very critical of the album's recording "dominated by blaring but thin organ and sloppy drumming" and of David Byron's "distant and unsure" performance, judging the album "completely adrift without a trace of spark".

== Track listing ==
All tracks are written by David Byron, Mick Box, Ken Hensley and Lee Kerslake except where noted

Side one
No.	Title	Writer(s)	Length
1.	"Return to Fantasy"	Hensley, Byron	5:52
2.	"Shady Lady"		4:46
3.	"Devil's Daughter"		4:48
4.	"Beautiful Dream"		4:52

Side two
No.	Title	Writer(s)	Length
5.	"Prima Donna"		3:11
6.	"Your Turn to Remember"	Hensley	4:22
7.	"Showdown"		4:17
8.	"Why Did You Go"		3:53
9.	"A Year or a Day"	Hensley	4:22
Total length:			40:35

1996 Essential remastered and expanded edition bonus tracks
No.	Title	Writer(s)	Length
10.	"Shout It Out" (B-side to single "Prima Donna")	Hensley	3:34
11.	"The Time Will Come" (B-side to single "Return to Fantasy")		4:10
12.	"Beautiful Dream" (previously unreleased version)		5:49
13.	"Return to Fantasy" (edited version)		3:39
Total length:			57:49

2004 Sanctuary Midline remastered and expanded edition bonus tracks
No.	Title	Length
10.	"Shout It Out" (B-side)	3:34
11.	"The Time Will Come" (B-side)	4:08
12.	"Prima Donna" (alternate demo version)	4:05
13.	"Why Did You Go" (alternate demo version)	5:18
14.	"Showdown" (alternate demo version)	4:18
15.	"Beautiful Dream" (alternate demo version)	5:48
16.	"Return to Fantasy" (extended version)	7:18
Total length:		75:08

== Personnel ==
Uriah Heep

- David Byron – lead vocals
- Mick Box – guitars
- Ken Hensley – keyboards, guitars, synthesizer, backing vocals
- Lee Kerslake – drums, percussion, backing vocals
- John Wetton – bass guitar, Mellotron, backing vocals

Additional musicians

- B. J. Cole – pedal steel on "Why Did You Go"
- Mel Collins – saxophone on "Prima Donna"

Production

- Gerry Bron – producer
- Peter Gallen – engineer
- Dave Burns, Dave Harris – assistant engineers
- Harry Moss – mastering engineer at EMI Abbey Road Studios, London
- Dave Field – illustration
- Joe Gaffney – photography

== Charts ==
=== Weekly charts ===
Chart (1975)	Peak position
Australian Albums (Kent Music Report)	19
Austrian Albums (Ö3 Austria)	3
Canada Top Albums/CDs (RPM)	83
Danish Albums (Hitlisten)	12
Dutch Albums (Album Top 100)	10
Finnish Albums (The Official Finnish Charts)	8
German Albums (Offizielle Top 100)	21
Japanese Albums (Oricon)	74
New Zealand Albums (RMNZ)	29
Norwegian Albums (VG-lista)	2
UK Albums (Official Charts)	7
US Billboard 200	85

==== Year-end charts ====
Chart (1975)	Position
German Albums (Offizielle Top 100)	49

== Certifications ==
Region	Certification	Certified units/sales
United Kingdom (BPI)	Silver	60,000^{^}
^{^} Shipments figures based on certification alone.
