= Mother's Choice =

Studio album by Buffalo
- Released: March 1976
- Recorded: E.M.J Studios & Trafalgar Studios, Sydney 1975 & 1976
- Genre: Hard rock
- Label: Vertigo; Aztec Music
- Producer: Buffalo and John Zulaikha

Buffalo chronology
Only Want You For Your Body (1974)	Mother's Choice (1976)	Average Rock 'n' Roller (1977)

Professional ratings
Review scores
Source	Rating
Allmusic	2.5/5 stars
I-94 Bar	(5/5)

Mother's Choice is the fourth album by Australian rock band Buffalo, recorded during 1975 and 1976 and originally released in 1976 by Vertigo Records. After the dismissal of founding guitarist John Baxter at the end of 1974, the band underwent both a major line up change, and a shift towards more commercially oriented hard rock in a bid to attain greater radio airplay (which had eluded them up to this point) and mainstream acceptance. However, Mother's Choice received a backlash both critically and commercially.

Also in contrast to Volcanic Rock and Only Want You For Your Body, the artwork Mother's Choice was overtly conservative. Whilst partly a result of the band striving for mainstream appeal, it was also partly in reaction to the management of Phonogram Records (parent company to the Vertigo label) objecting to two working titles for the album – Songs for the Frustrated Housewife and Thieves, Punks, Rip-Offs & Liars.

The album was remastered and reissued in December 2006 by Australian record label Aztec Music on CD with additional tracks.

== Track listing ==
All songs written by Dave Tice and Karl Taylor, except where noted.

1. Long Time Gone
2. Honey Babe
3. Taste It Don't Waste It
4. Little Queenie (Chuck Berry)
5. Lucky (Norm Roue)
6. Essukay (Buffalo)
7. Sweet Little Sixteen (Berry)
8. Be Alright
9. The Girl Can't Help It (Bobby Troup) – (B-side to "Little Queenie" single)*
10. On My Way – (B-side to "Lucky" single)*

* Bonus tracks on the 2006 Aztec Music reissue

== Line up ==
- Dave Tice – lead vocals
- Peter Wells – bass
- Karl Taylor – guitar
- Jimmy Econoumou – drums
- Norm Roue – slide guitar (except tracks 3 & 7)
- Mark Simmonds – saxophone (track 7 only)
