= Primevil =

American rock band

- Origin: Indianapolis, Indiana, United States
- Genres: Hard rock, psychedelic rock, acid rock, heavy metal
- Years active: 1972–1974
- Labels: 700 West, Cleopatra, ANAZITISI, Radioactive
- Past members: Dave Campton; Larry Lucas; Jay Wilfong; Mark Sipe; Mel Cupp

Primevil was an American rock band in the 1970s. In 1972 they recorded their only single, Too Dead To Live.

Their only album, Smokin' Bats at Campton's, has been described as "a bona fide stoner rock touchstone". It was released in 1974 and reissued on CD in 2006. Cleopatra Records issued the first, official U.S. compact disc and vinyl reissues of the album in December 2023 and January 2024, respectively.

In 2007, the group was mentioned in an article in Classic Rock magazine titled "The Lost Pioneers of Heavy Metal".

== Personnel ==
- Dave Campton – lead vocals, harp, percussion
- Larry Lucas – electric and acoustic guitar, vocals
- Jay Wilfong – electric guitar, screams
- Mark Sipe – bass
- Mel Cupp – drums

== Discography ==
- Smokin' Bats at Campton's (1974)
