= Wonderworld (album) =

Studio album by Uriah Heep
- Released: June 1974
- Recorded: January–March 1974
- Studio: Musicland (Munich)
- Genres: Hard rock; progressive rock; heavy metal
- Length: 37:40
- Label: Bronze
- Producer: Gerry Bron

Uriah Heep chronology
Sweet Freedom (1973)	Wonderworld (1974)	Return to Fantasy (1975)

Singles from Wonderworld
- 1. "Something or Nothing" Released: May 1974

Wonderworld is the seventh studio album by English rock band Uriah Heep, released in 1974 by Bronze Records in the UK and Warner Bros. Records in the US. Wonderworld was the last Uriah Heep album to feature bass player Gary Thain.

The original vinyl release was a single sleeve, with the lyrics reproduced on the inner liner.

The album was remastered and reissued by Castle Communications in 1996 with four bonus tracks, and again in 2004 in an expanded deluxe edition.

== Reception ==
Professional ratings
Review scores
Source	Rating
AllMusic	2.5/5 stars
Collector's Guide to Heavy Metal	6/10
Džuboks	mixed
Sputnikmusic	4/5 stars

AllMusic's retrospective review noted that "Wonderworld continues in the vein of Sweet Freedom, trying to bring Uriah Heep's appeal to a wider level while still retaining the grandiose trademark elements (the organ-guitar attack, David Byron's operatic shriek) that got them noticed". Comparing it to the band's prior work, reviewer Donald A. Guarisco added that "The result is an album that is solid but not as inspired as Look at Yourself or Demons and Wizards. The hard rock quotient is a little stronger on this album". Martin Popoff found Wonderworld "conceptually vacant" and "lacking the fluid instrumental chemistry that loosely held together its predecessor", while still containing two gems in the songs "Suicidal Man" and "So Tired".

== Track listing ==
Side one
No.	Title	Writer(s)	Length
1.	"Wonderworld"	Ken Hensley	4:29
2.	"Suicidal Man"	Mick Box, David Byron, Hensley, Lee Kerslake, Gary Thain	3:38
3.	"The Shadows and the Wind"	Hensley	4:27
4.	"So Tired"	Box, Byron, Hensley, Kerslake, Thain	3:39
5.	"The Easy Road"	Hensley	2:43

Side two
No.	Title	Writer(s)	Length
6.	"Something or Nothing"	Box, Hensley, Thain	2:56
7.	"I Won't Mind"	Box, Byron, Hensley, Kerslake, Thain	6:00
8.	"We Got We"	Box, Byron, Hensley, Kerslake, Thain	3:39
9.	"Dreams"	Box, Byron, Hensley	6:10

1996 remastered edition bonus tracks
No.	Title	Writer(s)	Length
10.	"What Can I Do" (single B-side)	Box, Kerslake, Byron	3:10
11.	"Dreams" (previously unreleased version)		7:08
12.	"Something or Nothing" (previously unreleased live version)		3:09
13.	"The Easy Road" (previously unreleased live version)		2:53
Total length:			51:00

2004 expanded deluxe edition bonus tracks
No.	Title	Writer(s)	Length
10.	"What Can I Do" (single B-side)		3:09
11.	"Love, Hate and Fear" (previously unreleased)	Hensley, Box, Byron, Thain, Kerslake	4:29
12.	"Stone's Throw" (previously unreleased)	Hensley, Box, Byron, Thain, Kerslake	5:36
13.	"Dreams" (extended version)		7:13
14.	"I Won't Mind" (live)		5:35
15.	"So Tired" (live)		3:29
Total length:			64:11

== Personnel ==
Uriah Heep

- David Byron – lead vocals
- Mick Box – guitars
- Ken Hensley – keyboards, guitars, backing vocals
- Lee Kerslake – drums, percussion, backing vocals
- Gary Thain – bass guitar

Additional musicians

- Jose Gabriel – synthesizers
- Michael Gibbs – orchestral arrangements on "The Easy Road"

Production

- Gerry Bron – producer
- Peter Gallen – recording engineer
- Hans Menzel, Macki – Musicland engineers
- Graham Hughes – photography and concept
- Harry Moss – cutting engineer

== Charts ==
=== Weekly charts ===
Chart (1974)	Peak position
Australian Albums (Kent Music Report)	19
Austrian Albums (Ö3 Austria)	2
Canada Top Albums/CDs (RPM)	31
Danish Albums (Hitlisten)	3
Finnish Albums (The Official Finnish Charts)	5
German Albums (Offizielle Top 100)	7
Japanese Albums (Oricon)	76
Norwegian Albums (VG-lista)	3
UK Albums (Official Charts)	23
US Billboard 200	38

=== Year-end charts ===
Chart (1974)	Position
German Albums (Offizielle Top 100)	40

== Certifications ==
Region	Certification	Certified units/sales
United Kingdom (BPI)	Silver	60,000^{^}
^{^} Shipments figures based on certification alone.
