= Kingdom Come (Sir Lord Baltimore album) =

Studio album by Sir Lord Baltimore
- Released: December 1970
- Recorded: Vantone Studios; Electric Lady Studios
- Genres: Psychedelic rock; hard rock; heavy metal
- Length: 38:00
- Label: Mercury
- Producers: Mike Appel, Jim Cretecos, Eddie Kramer, Kim King

Sir Lord Baltimore chronology
Kingdom Come (1970)	Sir Lord Baltimore (1971)

Singles from Kingdom Come
- 1. "Hard Rain Fallin'" / "Lady of Fire" Released: 1970; 2. "Master Heartache" / "I Got a Woman" Released: 1971

Kingdom Come is the debut studio album by American heavy metal band Sir Lord Baltimore, released on Mercury Records in 1970. It was one of the earliest heavy metal albums and is considered an important influence on the genre.

== Writing and recording ==
All of the songs on Kingdom Come were co-written and arranged by Mike Appel, who would later become Bruce Springsteen's manager. Co-produced by Appel and Jim Cretecos, the album was recorded at Vantone Studios in New Jersey before being mixed by Eddie Kramer and Kim King at Electric Lady Studios in New York. Kramer is well known for his work with Jimi Hendrix, the Beatles, the Rolling Stones, Kiss, Led Zeppelin, David Bowie and Curtis Mayfield.

== Musical style ==
This album is notable for the fact that its 1971 review in Creem contains an early documented use of the term "heavy metal" to refer to a style of music. It features distorted guitars and bass, enhanced by extensive use of multi-tracking, and has been compared to Deep Purple, Blue Cheer, Van Halen, Kiss and the Stooges.

Kingdom Come is also considered a pioneer in stoner rock.

== Release ==
Kingdom Come was released in December 1970.

It was reissued on PolyGram in 1994, on Red Fox in 2003, and on Anthology Recordings in 2007. The 1994 and 2003 re-releases also contained 1971's Sir Lord Baltimore. The re-release has a different track listing than the source material, transposing the original records' A- and B-sides. This compilation featured the same cover image used on Kingdom Come, only with that album's title removed.

== Reception ==
Professional ratings
Review scores
Source	Rating
AllMusic	4.5/5 stars

Kingdom Come has received acclaim from critics, and its influence on heavy metal music is well-noted. In his retrospective review, Marcos Hassan of Tiny Mix Tapes called it "[one] of those great records where not a second is wasted". Loudwire named it in #68 in their list "Top 70 Hard Rock + Metal Albums of the 1970s" and has called "one of the earliest true hard rock albums." The album ranked on the list "10 Essential Proto-metal Albums" by Classic Rock.

== Track listing ==
=== Original release ===
All tracks are written by Louis Dambra, Mike Appel and Jim Cretecos, except where noted.

Side one
No.	Title	Writer(s)	Length
1.	"Master Heartache"		4:37
2.	"Hard Rain Fallin'"		2:56
3.	"Lady of Fire"		2:53
4.	"Lake Isle of Innersfree"	Appel; Cretecos	4:03
5.	"Pumped Up"		4:07

Side two
No.	Title	Length
6.	"Kingdom Come"	6:35
7.	"I Got a Woman"	3:03
8.	"Hell Hound"	3:20
9.	"Helium Head (I Got a Love)"	4:02
10.	"Ain't Got Hung on You"	2:24
Total length:		38:00

Note

The cassette release of the album transposes the tracks "Lady of Fire" and "Hell Hound" in order to even the runtime of sides A and B.

=== 2007 reissue ===
Anthology Recordings' 2007 re-release contains an altered track listing, transposing sides A and B of the original record. (Polygram and Red Fox's reissues also used this track listing.)

No.	Title	Length
1.	"Kingdom Come"	6:35
2.	"I Got a Woman"	3:03
3.	"Hell Hound"	3:20
4.	"Helium Head (I Got a Love)"	4:02
5.	"Ain't Got Hung on You"	2:24
6.	"Master Heartache"	4:37
7.	"Hard Rain Fallin'"	2:56
8.	"Lady of Fire"	2:53
9.	"Lake Isle of Innersfree"	4:03
10.	"Pumped Up"	4:07

== Personnel ==
Sir Lord Baltimore

- John Garner – lead vocals, drums
- Louis Dambra – guitar
- Gary Justin – bass

Technical

- Mike Appel – production
- Jim Cretecos – production
- Eddie Kramer – engineering
- Kim King – engineering

== Charts ==
Chart (1971)	Peak position
US Billboard 200	198
