= Carmen Maki =

Japanese singer (born 1951)

- Maki in 1969

Background information
- Born: Maki Annette Lovelace; May 18, 1951 (age 75); Kamakura, Japan
- Genres: Rock; folk; spoken word
- Occupations: Musician; lyricist
- Instrument: Vocals
- Years active: 1969–present
- Labels: CBS/Sony; Universal; Toshiba EMI; Pioneer LDC
- Website: www.carmenmaki.jp

Carmen Maki (Japanese: カルメン・マキ, Hepburn: Karumen Maki; born Maki Annette Lovelace, May 18, 1951) is a Japanese singer and lyricist. After debuting as a folk singer in 1969 with the million-selling single "Toki ni wa Haha no Nai Ko no Yō ni", she quickly shifted to rock music and is best known for fronting the band Oz from 1972 to 1977. Maki was one of the first female rock vocalists in Japan, and her work with Oz and Blues Creation has been credited with pioneering Japanese rock in general.

== Early life ==
Maki Annette Lovelace was born in Kamakura, Japan to a Japanese mother and an American father. Her father left Japan shortly after Maki's birth, and she has no recollection of him. Her paternal grandfather was Irish, and her paternal grandmother was Polish-Jewish. Maki grew up in Ōta, Tokyo, where her maternal grandparents lived. In 1968, she dropped out of St. Hilda's School during her second year. Spending her time in jazz cafés and discotheques in Shinjuku and Shibuya, she eventually went to see Bluebeard performed by Shūji Terayama's Tenjō Sajiki theater company. Maki decided to join the troupe immediately, and had her first performance that August; Throw Away Your Books, Rally in the Streets at Tokyo Kōsei Nenkin Kaikan. At this time, she caught the attention of the newly formed CBS/Sony record label and was signed to a singing contract. The stage name Carmen Maki came to her by chance while rehearsing for the stage performance.

== Career ==
=== 1969–1978: Early career and Oz ===
Carmen Maki made her debut as a folk singer at age 17, with the February 1969 release of "Toki ni wa Haha no Nai Ko no Yō ni" (時には母のない子のように; 'Sometimes I Feel Like a Motherless Child'). With lyrics written by Terayama, it was a huge hit, selling over one million copies. It also earned her a spot performing at the 20th Kōhaku Uta Gassen, where her casual attire of jeans and bare-feet caused a stir. Between 1969 and 1970, Maki released three albums; Poems in the Midnight: Until the Candle Goes Out, Adam and Eve and Goodbye, My Memories. However, fed up with the entertainment industry and having to fit the image expected of her, Maki decided to switch to rock music in 1970 after hearing Janis Joplin for the first time. She also posed nude for Kishin Shinoyama's 1970 book Nude. Maki's contract with CBS/Sony had expired and every major record label was trying to sign her, but she turned them all down in order to play rock music. She formed the band Carmen Maki & Time Machine (カルメン・マキ＆タイムマシーン) with Haruo Chikada, Naoki "Mick" Tachikawa and others. However, she believes they only played one concert before disbanding; the first Nihon Gekijo Rock Carnival event in December 1970, which featured John Mayall. Nippon Columbia, the label of Blues Creation, a band Maki had gotten to know in early 1971, was one of the labels desperate to sign the singer, so the members of Blues Creation picked material from Maki's daily listening records and wrote some original songs for her. Together they released the album Carmen Maki/Blues Creation in August 1971. Tomoyuki Hokari of OK Music wrote that the album laid the foundation for Japanese rock.

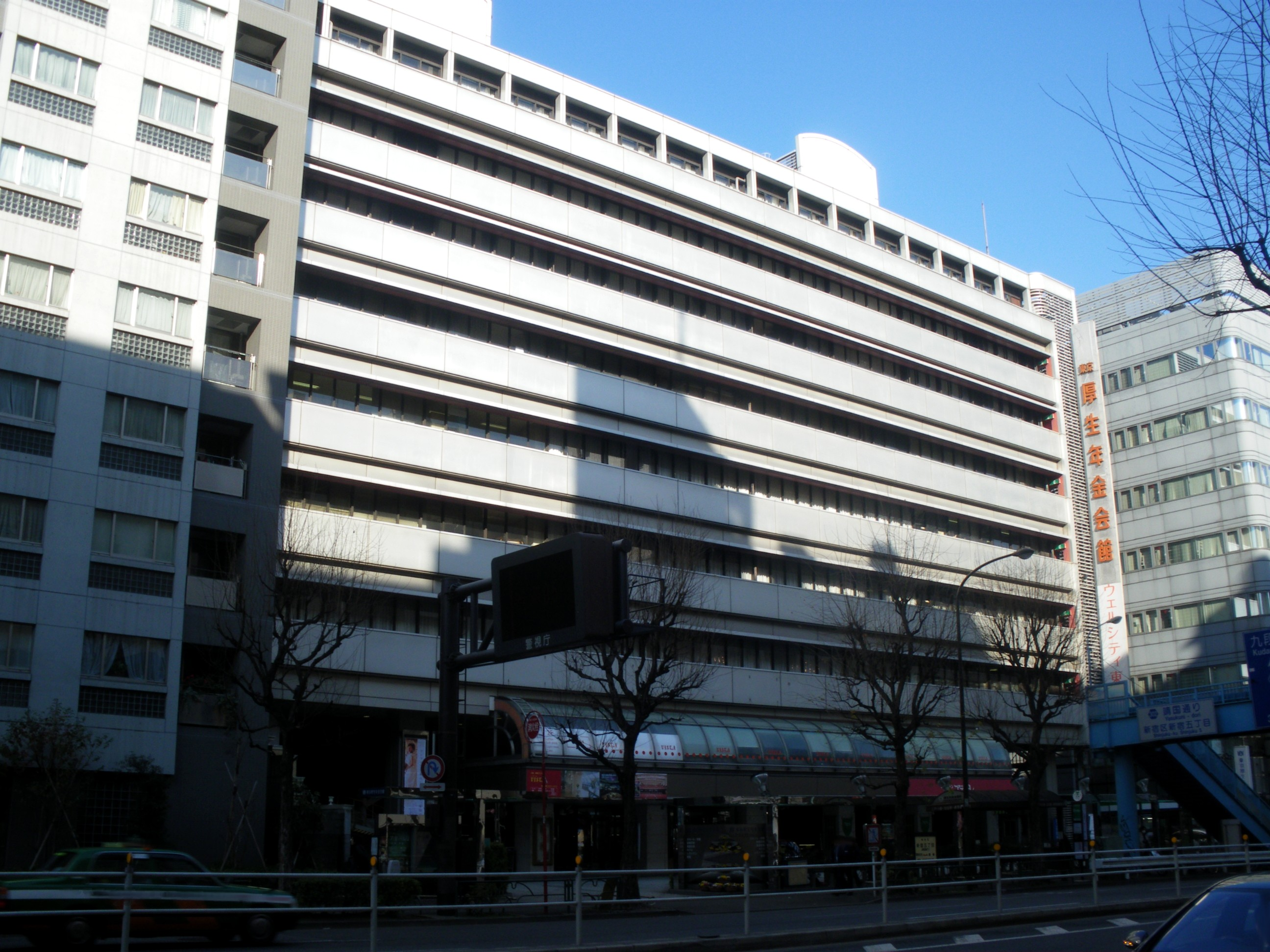
Carmen Maki & Oz held their final concert at Tokyo Kōsei Nenkin Kaikan in October 1977.

In 1972, Maki formed the rock band Carmen Maki & Oz (カルメン・マキ&OZ) with 18-year-old guitarist Hirofumi Kasuga, whom Blues Creation guitarist Kazuo Takeda had introduced her to. Bassist Yoshihiro Naruse (later of Casiopea) and Blues Creation drummer Masayuki Higuchi completed the original lineup, but Maki and Kasuga would remain the only constants throughout the band's career. Yasuyuki Hasegawa was another early drummer of the band. With the "Japanese-language Rock Controversy" (ja:日本語ロック論争, Nihongo Rokku Ronsō) going on at the time, the members of Oz were initially divided on whether to sing in English or Japanese. They settled on Japanese lyrics mainly written by Kasuga's high school classmate Tsuyoshi Kajiki (vocalist of Daddy Takechiyo & Tokyo Otoboke Cats), who became their manager, and played beer gardens and discotheques five times a day. The band struggled at first, but eventually made their debut with Polydor Records in November 1974 with the single "Gozen Ichi-ji no Sketch". In January 1975, they released their self-titled first album with bassist Akira Chiyotani and 15-year-old drummer Takashi Furuta. It sold 100,000 copies, a big success for a rock band at the time, and includes their best-known song, the nearly 12-minute "Watashi wa Kaze", which Maki wrote the lyrics to. OK Music's Hiroko Yamamoto called the album a masterpiece that is indispensable in the history of Japanese rock. That year, the group, now with drummer Masami Naito, opened for Grand Funk Railroad in May, and Jeff Beck in August.

Oz recorded their second album, July 1976's Tozasareta Machi, in Los Angeles with Shigeyuki Kawakami on bass and Yoshikazu Kudo on drums. They returned to Japan for a 33-date tour, but sales of the album were slow. Carmen Maki & Oz disbanded after an October 18, 1977 show at Tokyo Kōsei Nenkin Kaikan. Their third and final studio album, III, was recorded with Osamu Takeda on drums and released that December. In 1978, a single of "Watashi wa Kaze" was released, followed by the live album Live, which was recorded at their final concert and an earlier May 1977 show at Hibiya Open-Air Concert Hall. Maki would later say in 2026 that there were various reasons for the break up, including the fact that their long-time manager moved to the United States, but she also felt the band had reached its limit. However, she considers Oz to have been a miracle; "Just the fact that it was a rock band with a female vocalist singing in Japanese was groundbreaking and created quite a buzz back then, but above all, the musicality was truly one-of-a-kind. I still believe no other band made music quite like that. I think it could have held its own on the global stage, too. All the members of Oz feel it doesn't get the recognition it deserves—even if we don't always say it out loud."

=== 1979–present: Solo return and other bands ===
In 1979, Maki released the solo album Night Stalker, which features Carmine Appice as producer, drummer and songwriter, Earl Slick on guitar, Jean Millington on bass, and Jim Diamond as lyricist. The following year she teamed up with guitarist George Azuma, bassist Kinta Moriyama and drummer Yoshitaka Shimada to form the band Carmen Maki & Laff, who released a self-titled album in June 1980. However, it did not sell well and Maki was arrested for possession of illegal stimulants that September. She was arrested again in November of that same year for marijuana possession. With Jun Harada replacing Shimada on drums, Laff evolved into the heavy metal band 5X, who released the studio album Human Target and the live album Live X in 1982. In 1983, Maki posed nude for Weekly Playboy and 5X disbanded after releasing the album Carmen Maki's 5X. Maki formed the Urusakute Gomenne Band (うるさくてゴメンねBAND) in 1986 with former Oz bassist Yoshihiro Naruse, future B'z guitarist Tak Matsumoto, Make-Up vocalist Nobuo Yamada, and Daddy Takechiyo & Tokyo Otoboke Cats drummer Soul Toul. They released a live album the following year. Maki sang "Ai wa Shinwa no Hate ni" to be the theme song of the 1987 anime Yōtōden. After giving birth to a daughter in 1989 at the age of 38, Maki took a break from music in order to focus on family. She seriously considered quitting singing around this time, but says she was "destined" to return.

In 1993, Carmen Maki acquired Japanese citizenship and resumed her music career with a re-recording of "Toki ni wa Haha no Nai Ko no Yō ni" and the album Moon Songs. She formed the band Moses the following year, and they released the album Voices of Moses in 1995. Maki released the solo album Unison in 1996, with Kasuga producing. She then formed the band Unison Unit in 1997, with the musicians she worked with on that album. Carmen Maki & Oz reunited for one-night only at Kyoto University's Yoshida Campus on December 27, 1997. The following year, Maki released the album Split. In 2000, Maki toured as guest vocalist for BB&C, a trio of Appice, Tim Bogert and Char. She formed the band Carmen Maki and Salamandre in 2003, and they released a self-titled album that same year. The singer released Another Way, an acoustic album, in 2004, and Shiroi Tsuki, an album of poetry, in 2008.

Maki had an acting role in the 2011 film Detective in the Bar, which also used her recording "Tokei o Tomete" as its theme song. She sang "Namida no Kawaku Made" for Shigeru Izumiya's 2013 album Shōwa no Uta yo, Arigatō. In November 2014 and February 2015, Maki held three concerts celebrating her 45th anniversary as a musician. The first on November 25, focused on her rock material and included various musicians from the various bands she was in throughout her career, including a reunion of Oz. The second two on February 6 and 7, focused on her "underground" material. She wrote the lyrics to and sang "Shisha no Uta" for Darjeeling's 2017 debut album 8 Shin Futaba ~ Winter Blend. On October 7, 2018, Carmen Maki & Oz reunited to perform at a concert held to celebrate the 30th anniversary of Club Citta. They then held what was billed as their last tour to commemorate the 45th anniversary of their debut, from November 23 and December 13, 2019. They have continued to perform a few concerts every year since. Their two December 2022 shows featured four different drummers from the band's history.

Maki formed the trio Kachōfūgetsu (花鳥風月) with drummer Masaharu Sato and guitarist Falcon. With them, she combines spoken-word performances with improvised live music. She is also concurrently in the band Vintage Makes Something New with the rhythm section from Oz, and often performs with the Kansai-based band Elektric Moth as a featured artist. In 2024, Kachōfūgetsu performed a tour to commemorate Maki's 55th anniversary in music, and released a self-titled live album. In November 2026, Maki will perform with Blues Creation guitarist Kazuo Takeda for the first time in 55 years, when Vintage Makes Something New plays two joint gigs with Creation.

== Discography ==
=== Studio albums ===
- Poems in the Midnight: Until the Candle Goes Out (真夜中詩集ーろうそくの消えるまでー; 1969)
- Adam and Eve (1969)
- Goodbye, My Memories (1970)
- Carmen Maki/Blues Creation (1971) – Carmen Maki/Blues Creation
- Carmen Maki & Oz (1975) – Carmen Maki & Oz
- Tozasareta Machi (閉ざされた町; 1976) – Carmen Maki & Oz
- III (1977) – Carmen Maki & Oz
- Night Stalker (1979)
- Laff (1980) – Carmen Maki & Laff
- Human Target (1982) – 5X
- Carmen Maki's 5X (1983) – 5X
- Moon Song (1993)
- Voice of Moses (1995) – Carmen Maki & Moses
- Unison (1996)
- Split (1998)
- Carmen Maki and Salamandre (2003) – Carmen Maki and Salamandre
- Another Way (2004)
- Shiroi Tsuki (白い月; 2008)
- Persona (2009)
- From the Bottom (2012)

=== Other work ===
- Yoshihiro Naruse and Urusakute Gomenne Band; Urusakute Gomenne Band Live (うるさくてゴメンねBAND LIVE; 1987) – vocals
- Blues Creation; Hakunetsu no Blues Creation Live! (白熱のブルースクリエイション Live!; 1989) – vocals on "Understand"
- Shigeru Izumiya; Shōwa no Uta yo, Arigatō (昭和の歌よ、ありがとう; 2013) – lead vocals on "Namida no Kawaku Made" (涙のかわくまで)
- Darjeeling; 8 Shin Futaba ~ Winter Blend (8芯二葉～WinterBlend; 2017) – lyrics and guest vocals on "Shisha no Uta" (死者の歌)
