= White Wolf (band) =

Canadian heavy metal band

White Wolf is a Canadian heavy metal band from Edmonton, Alberta, led by Don Wolf.

== History ==
White Wolf originally formed in 1975 under the name Slamm, then changed to Warrior before settling on White Wolf. The group played locally for several years before landing a recording contract with RCA Records; their debut album, Standing Alone, was issued on the label in 1984. The band toured in Canada, the United States, Europe and Japan in support of the album.

A second album, Endangered Species, was released in 1986. The album included one song which was made into a music video: "She".

The group disbanded shortly after completing the album, but released a third album with new material, Victim Of The Spotlight, in 2007. They came together again for a tour of Germany that year; a concert from this tour was recorded live and released in 2008 by Escape Music as WHITE WOLF Live in Germany.

As of 2016, White Wolf continues to perform occasionally at local venues.

== Members ==
=== Current members ===
- Don Wolf (Wilk) - vocals, keyboards
- Cam McLeod - lead guitar, vocals, record producer
- Scott Webb - rhythm & lead guitar, backing vocals
- Russel Berquist - bass, backing vocals
- Brendan Ostrander - drums, backing vocals
- David J Petovar - keyboards, backing vocals

=== Past members ===
- Rick Nelson - guitar
- Loris Bolzon - drums
- Les Schwartz - bass
- Martin Kronlund - guitar
- Richard Quist - bass, keyboards
- Imre Daun - drums
- Dale Christie - guitar

== Discography ==
- Standing Alone (RCA, 1984), U.S. No. 162
- Endangered Species (RCA, 1986), U.S. No. 137
- Victim of the Spotlight (Escape Music, 2007)
- Standing Alone/Endangered Species (2 disc digipack) (Escape Music, 2007)
- Live in Germany (Escape Music, 2009)
