= Sir Lord Baltimore (album) =

Studio album by Sir Lord Baltimore
- Released: 1971
- Genre: Hard rock
- Length: 32:00
- Label: Mercury Records

Sir Lord Baltimore chronology
Kingdom Come (1970)	Sir Lord Baltimore (1971)	Sir Lord Baltimore III Raw (2006)

Professional ratings
Review scores
Source	Rating
AllMusic	3/5 stars

Sir Lord Baltimore is the second studio album by American rock band Sir Lord Baltimore, released by Mercury Records in 1971. It was reissued on PolyGram in 1994, and on Red Fox in 2003. The 1994 and 2003 re-releases also contained 1970's Kingdom Come, and were titled Kingdom Come/Sir Lord Baltimore.

This album marked a change in direction, with the frenetic pace of the first album giving way to a slower tempo. Sir Lord Baltimore expanded to a quartet for this album, with Louis Dambra's brother, Joey Dambra, joining as a second guitarist. Sir Lord Baltimore contained a supposed live recording, "Where Are We Going", later confirmed by leader John Garner to have been recorded at Mercury Studios, with the audience dubbed in at the producer's request.

The chorus guitar riff to "Woman Tamer" was used by stoner rock band Monster Magnet on the title track of their 1995 album Dopes to Infinity.

== Track listing ==
=== Side 1 ===
1. "Man from Manhattan" – 10:34
2. "Where Are We Going" ["Live"] – 3:19

=== Side 2 ===
1. "Chicago Lives" – 3:49
2. "Loe and Behold" – 3:46
3. "Woman Tamer" – 5:12
4. "Caesar LXXI" – 5:22

== Personnel ==
- John Garner – vocals, drums
- Louis Dambra – guitar
- Joey Dambra – guitar
- Gary Justin – bass
