= Jerusalem (British band) =

British hard rock band

- Origin: Salisbury, Wiltshire, England
- Genres: Hard rock, psychedelic rock, heavy metal
- Years active: 1967–1972
- Labels: Deram; Universal; Rockadrome
- Members: Paul Dean; Ray Sparrow; Bill Hinde; Bob Cooke; Lynden Williams
- Website: http://jerusalembanduk.wixsite.com/mysite

Jerusalem were a British hard rock band.

== History ==
The five-member band released one self-titled album worldwide in 1972 on Deram Records (UK catalogue number: SLD 6), produced by Ian Gillan of Deep Purple. Their only other release that decade was a 45 rpm 7 inch single, the non-album "Kamikaze Moth" backed with "Frustration" from the LP.

They gigged throughout Europe and shared the same stage as bands such as Black Sabbath, Deep Purple, Uriah Heep and Status Quo. They also played at some of the major festivals in Europe.

Although Jerusalem signed with Deram, Nick Mobbs, head of EMI's Harvest Records label also wanted them; he later became head of A&R for EMI and was the first person to sign the Sex Pistols. Founders of the band, Paul Dean and Ray Sparrow, eventually split the band, and formed a three piece with Bob Cooke called Pussy, who released a single on Deram called "Feline Woman". Jerusalem's debut album was re-issued by Universal as a Japanese CD (2005), and has also become available through many rock music websites.

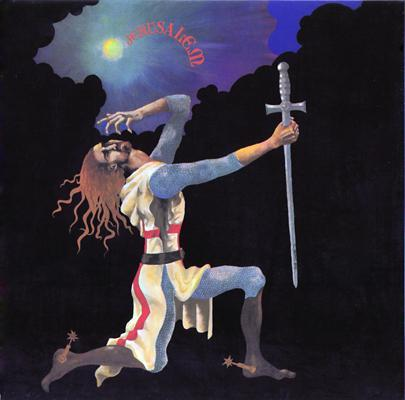
Cover of Jerusalem's self-titled album

In 2007, Dean revealed that the original 2" multi-track masters of the album would be re-mastered, re-mixed and re-released in January 2009. The album and single will be available on CD and vinyl, published by Rockadrome Records, and will include extra materials like bonus tracks, blog, history, etc. The Jerusalem CD was released in 2009, vinyl in 2011 and the first ever release of the Pussy album (CD) was released in 2012, all by Rockadrome Records.

Ian Gillan's thoughts about the band and working with the album (as printed on the back side of the album's sleeve):

This is the first album by Jerusalem, a band which excites me very much; they are rough, raw and doomy with their own strong identity. As they are young and a bit green, they don't follow many rules, so their material is almost crude - but still immensely powerful in content.

I believe that, whenever possible, the work of writers and players in their formative stages should be recorded; before inhibition and self-consciousness set in, before fire and aggression die down, and while they are still absorbing influences and doing things which others might consider 'uncool'. Most important though, before they might develop that self-imposed rigidity which afflicts so many. I hope none of these things happen to Jerusalem, we'll have to wait and see, this album is just in case.

I hope you like it as much as I do.

== Discography ==
- Jerusalem vinyl album (Deram, 1972)
- "Kamakazi Moth" (Deram, 1972)
- Jerusalem CD (Universal Music Japan, 2004)
- Jerusalem (remastered reissue CD, Rockadrome Records, 2009)
- Jerusalem (remastered reissue vinyl, Rockadrome Records, 2012)
- Jerusalem (special edition on purple vinyl, Rockadrome Records, 2016)
- "Kamakazi Moth" (remastered reissue, Rockadrome Records, 2016)

== Members ==
1970 Band line-up:

- Paul Dean: Bass
- Ray Sparrow: Drums
- Bill Hinde: Guitar
- Bob Cooke: Guitar
- Lynden Williams: Vocals

1974 Band Line-up:

- Pete Willoby: Bass
- Ray Sparrow: Drums
- John Platt: Keyboards
- Bob Cooke: Lead Guitar
- Gary Shortland: Lead Vocals
