= Dead Forever... =

Studio album by Buffalo
- Released: June 1972
- Recorded: United Sound & Copperfield Sound Productions, Sydney, 1972
- Genre: Acid rock; proto-metal
- Length: 49:28
- Label: Vertigo; Aztec Music
- Producer: Spencer Lee

Buffalo chronology
Dead Forever... (1972)	Volcanic Rock (1973)

Professional ratings
Review scores
Source	Rating
Allmusic	3/5 stars
Brave Words & Bloody Knuckles	7/10
I-94 Bar	4/5

Dead Forever... is the debut album by Australian rock band Buffalo, recorded and originally released in 1972. The album was remastered and reissued in March 2006 by Australian record label Aztec Music on CD with additional tracks, including an A-side and B-side released by the pre-Buffalo outfit Head.

== Track listing ==
No.	Title	Writer(s)	Length
1.	"Leader"	Dave Tice, John Baxter, Peter Wells	6:07
2.	"Suzie Sunshine"	Baxter, Peter Brett	3:00
3.	"Pay my Dues"	Joe Lala, Mike Pinera (Blues Image cover)	5:36
4.	"I'm a Mover"	Paul Rodgers, Andy Fraser (Free cover)	10:57
5.	"Ballad of Irving Fink"	Baxter, Alan Milano	4:37
6.	"Bean Stew"	Tice, Baxter	7:11
7.	"Forest Rain"	Tice, Baxter	6:28
8.	"Dead Forever"	Tice, Baxter	5:32
Total length:			49:28

=== 2006 Aztec Music Reissue Bonus Tracks ===
No.	Title	Writer(s)	Length
1.	"Hobo"	Tice, Baxter (recording by Head)	2:46
2.	"Sad Song, Then"	Baxter (recording by Head)	2:37
3.	"No Particular Place to Go"	Chuck Berry (cover)	4:53
4.	"Just a Little Rock and Roll ("A Shot of Rhythm and Blues")"	Terry Thompson	2:24
5.	"Barbershop Rock"	Baxter	3:24

== Personnel ==
- Dave Tice – co-lead vocals
- Alan Milano – co-lead vocals
- Peter Wells – bass
- John Baxter – guitar
- Paul Balbi – drums
