= Sir Lord Baltimore =

American rock band

- Left to right: Louis Dambra, Gary Justin, John Garner, c. 1971

Background information
- Origin: New York City, U.S.
- Genres: Hard rock; heavy metal
- Years active: 1968–1976; 2006–2015
- Labels: Mercury; PolyGram; Red Fox; JG; Anthology
- Past members: John Garner; Louis Dambra; Gary Justin; Joey Dambra

Sir Lord Baltimore was an American rock and early heavy metal band from Brooklyn, New York City, that was formed in 1968 and consisted of lead vocalist and drummer John Garner, guitarist Louis Dambra, and bassist Gary Justin. In a 1971 review of their debut record, Kingdom Come, Creem magazine as containing the first documented use of the term "heavy metal" to refer to a style of music. AllMusic described them as "arguably America's first bona fide heavy metal band". Sir Lord Baltimore featured a drumming lead singer, traditionally a rarity in rock and metal music.

In 2006, Garner and Dambra reunited as Sir Lord Baltimore and released a new album, Sir Lord Baltimore III Raw. The reformed band featured an overt Christian focus and lyrics, an emphasis not found in their earlier work. Justin, no longer an active musician, did not participate. Garner died on December 5, 2015, of liver failure, ending the band.

== History ==
=== Original career ===
Kingdom Come (1970)

Having first met in high school, Garner (the band creator), Dambra, and Justin started rehearsing together in 1968. At the time of their formation, Dambra (as Louis Caine) was also playing for a group called the Koala, who released an eponymous album in 1969. Justin has cited Cream's Jack Bruce as an influence on his early career choice.

After a relatively short time, the new band auditioned for Mike Appel, who was then working as a talent scout (he would later launch and manage the career of Bruce Springsteen). Appel agreed to mentor them and reportedly gave them the name Sir Lord Baltimore, taken from a character in Butch Cassidy and the Sundance Kid. For the group's debut album, Appel served as co-producer as well as contributing to arrangements and lyrics.

That album, Kingdom Come, was recorded at Vantone Studios and engineered by Nick Masse, with Jim Cretecos serving as Appel's co-producer. Additional tracks, mixing and overdubbing were done at Electric Lady Studios with legendary engineer Eddie Kramer, better known for his work with Jimi Hendrix. According to Appel, Pink Floyd had the opportunity to hear Sir Lord Baltimore during these sessions, and were reportedly impressed.

Sir Lord Baltimore (1971)

Released on Mercury Records in 1970, Kingdom Come featured very fast-paced hard rock with high levels of distortion in the guitar and, in some cases, the bass, and extensive multi-tracking to further enhance the guitar sound. Though this style would become popular in later years, it was considerably different from the majority of that era's contemporary rock music.

On February 19–20, 1971, Sir Lord Baltimore played consecutive nights at New York's Fillmore East as the opening act on a bill that included the J. Geils Band and Black Sabbath, as part of the latter's Paranoid tour. (Sir Lord Baltimore played additional dates on this tour, as well.) A photo of the band used in the Fillmore East's programs was later used as the cover of their 2006 reunion album, Sir Lord Baltimore III Raw.

=== Legacy ===
In May 1971, Mike Saunders (of later Angry Samoans fame) wrote a favorable review of Kingdom Come for Creem. Of historical note was Saunders' assertion that "...Sir Lord Baltimore seems to have down pat most all the best heavy metal tricks in the book", one of the first printed uses of the term "heavy metal" to reference a musical genre.

Issued in 1971, also on Mercury, Sir Lord Baltimore marked a change in direction, with Kingdom Come's frenetic pace giving way to slower tempos more reminiscent of music produced by the band's hard rock peers. Sir Lord Baltimore expanded to a quartet for this album, with Louis Dambra's brother, Joey Dambra, joining as a second guitarist. Sir Lord Baltimore contains a supposed live recording, "Where Are We Going", which was actually recorded at Mercury Studios. The audience was dubbed in as the producer thought it was a good idea to include a "live" track.

Their career started to fade after Sir Lord Baltimore's release, and Mercury dropped them shortly thereafter. The band publicly blamed drugs on its initial downfall, with low record sales and non-payment of royalties also being cited. However, the band did start work in the mid-1970s on an unreleased third album, originally scheduled for 1976, and music written for that project was eventually used on Sir Lord Baltimore III Raw.

In 1994, Kingdom Come and Sir Lord Baltimore were reissued on a single CD, Kingdom Come/Sir Lord Baltimore, by PolyGram, However, the track listing on the combined CD differed from the original recordings. Kingdom Come was issued again separately on digital in 2007, this time on Anthology Recordings.

In 2009 the Japanese band Church of Misery covered Sir Lord Baltimore's "Master Heartache" on their album Houses of the Unholy.

=== Reunion ===
Sir Lord Baltimore III Raw (2006)

Some 30 years after the band's breakup, Garner and Dambra reunited to record and self-distribute a new Sir Lord Baltimore album, Sir Lord Baltimore III Raw. Garner produced the album, issued on JG Records in July 2006 and available only via mail order. The majority of the album's bass guitar work was performed by Tony Franklin, with guitarist Anthony Guido and bass player Sam Powell being credited as guest musicians. Although the album's music was originally written for the aborted 1976 release, the lyrics were modified to present more overt Christian viewpoint.

In 2007, Garner and Swedish guitar player Janne Stark (formerly of Overdrive and Locomotive Breath) recorded a new version of "Woman Tamer" from SLB's second album. In March 2008, it was announced that Garner and Stark, with a selected bass player, would make an appearance at Sweden Rock Festival in June 2008, but lack of pay and other mitigating circumstances prevented them from performing. Dambra became a pastor, ministering to homeless families in Los Angeles. He died in 2019.

Garner (born John Guarneri on February 2, 1952, in Brooklyn, New York) died of liver failure on December 5, 2015, at the age of 63; effectively ending the band.

== Members ==
- John Garner – vocals, drums (1968–1976, 2006–2015; died 2015)
- Louis Dambra – guitar (1968–1976, 2006–2007; died 2019)
- Gary Justin – bass (1968–1976)
- Joey Dambra – guitar (1970–1972)

== Discography ==
=== Studio albums ===
Year	Album	US Top 200
1970	Kingdom Come	198
1971	Sir Lord Baltimore	-
2006	Sir Lord Baltimore III Raw	-

=== Compilation albums ===
Year	Album
1994	Kingdom Come/Sir Lord Baltimore
2020	Complete Recordings 1970–2006

=== Singles ===
- "Hard Rain Fallin'" / "Lady of Fire" (1970)
- "Master Heartache" / "I Got a Woman" (1971)
