= Warpig (album) =

Studio album by Warpig
- Released: 1972 (Canada)
- Recorded: 1970
- Genre: Hard rock, heavy metal
- Length: 40:41
- Label: Fonthill (original pressing)
- Producer: Robert Irving

Warpig is the only album by Canadian hard rock band Warpig. It was released in 1972 on the local indie label Fonthill Records. In 1973, the album was re-released by London; it was also re-released in 2006 via Relapse and then Kreation Records in 2009.

Professional ratings
Review scores
Source	Rating
AllMusic	4.5/5 stars

== Track listing ==
All songs were written by Warpig.

Side one

1. Flaggit – 3:09
2. Tough Nuts – 2:18
3. Melody with Balls – 6:02
4. Advance AM – 7:30

Side two

1. Rock Star – 4:11
2. Sunflight – 4:30
3. U.X.I.B. – 7:39
4. The Moth – 5:08

== Personnel ==
Musicians

- Rick Donmoyer – electric and acoustic guitars, lead vocals
- Dana Snitch – keyboards, backing vocals
- Terry Brett – bass guitar
- Terry Hook – drums, percussion

Production

- Producer – Robert Irving
- Recording, engineering & mixing – Ken Fresian
- Mastering – Peter J. Moore
