= Sweet Freedom (Uriah Heep album) =

Studio album by Uriah Heep
- Released: September 1973
- Recorded: June–July 1973
- Studios: Château d'Hérouville, France
- Genres: Hard rock; progressive rock; heavy metal
- Length: 37:23
- Label: Bronze
- Producer: Gerry Bron

Uriah Heep chronology
The Magician's Birthday (1972)	Sweet Freedom (1973)	Wonderworld (1974)

Singles from Sweet Freedom
- 1. "Stealin'" Released: August 1973; 2. "Dreamer" Released: October 1973 (Japan); 3. "Seven Stars" Released: November 1973 (NL and Japan)

Professional ratings
Review scores
Source	Rating
AllMusic	3/5 stars
Collector's Guide to Heavy Metal	8/10

Sweet Freedom is the sixth studio album by English rock band Uriah Heep, released in September 1973 by Bronze Records in the UK and Warner Bros. Records in the US.

The original vinyl release was a gatefold, reproducing the lyrics within. There was also a central page with a photograph of each band member.

It was the first Uriah Heep album to be released by Warner Bros. in the U.S. Sweet Freedom reached No. 33 in the US Billboard 200 chart. It was certified gold by the RIAA on 5 March 1974.

AllMusic's retrospective review noted that Heep "began to explore new styles to flesh out their combination of prog complexity and heavy metal muscle."

The album was remastered and reissued by Castle Communications in 1996 with two bonus tracks, and again in 2004 in an expanded deluxe edition.

== Track listing ==
All tracks are written by Ken Hensley, except where noted.

Side one
No.	Title	Writer(s)	Length
1.	"Dreamer"	Gary Thain, Mick Box	3:41
2.	"Stealin'"		4:49
3.	"One Day"	Hensley, Thain	2:47
4.	"Sweet Freedom"		6:37

Side two
No.	Title	Writer(s)	Length
5.	"If I Had the Time"		5:43
6.	"Seven Stars"		3:52
7.	"Circus"	Thain, Box, Lee Kerslake	2:44
8.	"Pilgrim"	Hensley, David Byron	7:10
Total length:			37:23

1996 remastered edition bonus tracks
No.	Title	Writer(s)	Length
9.	"Silver White Man"	Byron	3:40
10.	"Crystal Ball"	Thain	4:08

2004 expanded deluxe edition bonus tracks
No.	Title	Writer(s)	Length
9.	"Sunshine"	Thain, Box	4:48
10.	"Seven Stars" (extended version)		7:03
11.	"Pilgrim" (extended version – previously unreleased)	Hensley, Byron	8:29
12.	"If I Had the Time" (demo)		6:02
13.	"Sweet Freedom" (alternative live version)		6:48
14.	"Stealin'" (alternative live version)		5:41

== Personnel ==
Uriah Heep

- David Byron – lead vocals
- Mick Box – guitars
- Ken Hensley – keyboards, guitars, backing vocals
- Lee Kerslake – drums, percussion, backing vocals
- Gary Thain – bass guitar

Production

- Gerry Bron – producer
- Peter Gallen – engineer, mixing at Lansdowne Studios, London

== Charts ==
Chart (1973–74)	Peak position
Australian Albums (Kent Music Report)	19
Austrian Albums (Ö3 Austria)	9
Canada Top Albums/CDs (RPM)	5
Danish Albums (Hitlisten)	14
Finnish Albums (The Official Finnish Charts)	2
German Albums (Offizielle Top 100)	12
Japanese Albums (Oricon)	45
Norwegian Albums (VG-lista)	2
UK Albums (Official Charts)	18
US Billboard 200	33

== Certifications ==
Region	Certification	Certified units/sales
United Kingdom (BPI)	Silver	60,000^{^}
United States (RIAA)	Gold	500,000^{^}
^{^} Shipments figures based on certification alone.
