= Only Want You for Your Body =

Studio album by Buffalo
- Released: June 1974
- Recorded: United Sound, Sydney, 1974
- Genre: Heavy metal
- Length: 34:21
- Label: Vertigo; Aztec Music
- Producer: Spencer Lee

Buffalo chronology
Buffalo (1974)	Only Want You for Your Body (1974)	Mother's Choice (1976)

Professional ratings
Review scores
Source	Rating
Allmusic	3/5 stars
I-94 Bar	6/5

Only Want You for Your Body is the third album by Australian rock band Buffalo, recorded and originally released in 1974 on the Vertigo label. The album was remastered and reissued in November 2005 by Australian record label Aztec Music on CD with additional tracks.

== Track listing ==
All tracks written by Dave Tice and John Baxter, unless noted

1. "I'm a Skirt Lifter, Not a Shirt Raiser" – 4:52
2. "I'm Coming On" (Alvin Lee) (Ten Years After cover) – 3:39
3. "Dune Messiah" – 4:32
4. "Stay with Me" – 3:37
5. "What's Going On" – 3:57
6. "Kings Cross Ladies" – 7:27
7. "United Nations" – 6:17
8. "What's Going On" (single version)* – 3:20
9. "United Nations" (live at Hordern Pavilion, Sydney, April 1974 – recorded for ABC-TV program GTK)* – 7:50

* Bonus tracks on the 2005 Aztec Music reissue

== Personnel ==
- Dave Tice – lead vocals
- John Baxter – guitar
- Peter Wells – bass
- Jimmy Economou – drums, backing vocals
