= Volcanic Rock (album) =

Studio album by Buffalo
- Released: August 1973
- Recorded: 1973
- Studio: United Sound, Sydney
- Genre: Heavy metal
- Length: 37:35
- Label: Vertigo; Aztec Music
- Producer: Spencer Lee

Buffalo chronology
Dead Forever... (1972)	Volcanic Rock (1973)	Buffalo (1974)

Professional ratings
Review scores
Source	Rating
Allmusic	4.5/5 stars
I-94 Bar	6/5

Volcanic Rock is the second studio album by Australian rock band Buffalo, recorded and originally released in 1973 on the Vertigo label. The album was remastered and reissued in September 2005 by Australian record label Aztec Music on CD with additional tracks.

== Track listing ==
All tracks written by David John Tice and John Allan Baxter, unless noted.

No.	Title	Length
1.	"Sunrise (Come My Way)"	4:58
2.	"Freedom"	9:02
3.	"Till My Death"	5:37
4.	"The Prophet"	7:25
5.	"(i) Intro: Pound of Flesh" (John Baxter, Pete Wells)	4:35
6.	"(ii) Shylock"	5:58
Total length:		37:35

- On the original LP "Intro: Pound of Flesh"/"Shylock" is a single two-part track, it was divided into two separate tracks, "Intro: Pound of Flesh" and "Shylock", on Aztec Music CD reissue

=== 2005 Aztec Music Reissue Bonus Tracks ===
No.	Title	Length
7.	"Sunrise (Come My Way)" (single version)	3:42
8.	"Shylock" (Live) at Sydney Spring Festival 1973, (Hyde Park, Sydney)	6:01

== Personnel ==
- Dave Tice – lead vocals
- Peter Wells – bass
- John Baxter – guitar
- Jimmy Economou – drums
