= Warpig (band) =

Canadian rock band

- Origin: Woodstock, Ontario, Canada
- Genres: Hard rock, progressive rock, psychedelic rock, heavy metal
- Years active: 1968–1975, 2004–present
- Labels: Relapse, London, Fonthill
- Members: Rick Donmoyer; Dana Snitch; Terry Hook; Terry Brett

Warpig is a Canadian rock band. They gained a fan following in the Ontario club circuit in the 1970s and performed shows with Wishbone Ash, Savoy Brown, Manfred Mann, Quicksilver Messenger Service, and Mahogany Rush.

== History ==
=== Formation and album release (1968–1973) ===
Before forming Warpig in 1968, band members Rick Donmoyer, Thomas "Dana" Snitch, Terry Hook, and Terry Brett had played and toured in several other Canadian rock groups, including Mass Destruction, Wot and The Kingbees. They signed with independent label Fonthill Records and at Sound Canada studios recorded their debut album in 1972, engineered by Ken Friesan. In 1973, London Records re-released the Warpig album with new cover art and two tracks re-recorded at Toronto Sound Studios with Terry Brown, producer for Canadian rock icons Rush. Later, between June and July of that year, the re-recorded version of Warpig's single "Rock Star" made the RPM charts for 7 seven weeks peaking at 52.

=== Breakup and reunion (1974–1975, 2004–present) ===
Members Terry Hook and Dana Snitch left the band between 1974 and 1975; the group eventually disbanded. Rick Donmoyer later toured with the band Ash Mountain. Warpig reunited in 2004 after copies of their debut album starting attracting high prices on eBay. Their self-titled album was officially reissued in 2006 on Relapse Records, though many bootlegged versions on CD and vinyl continued to show up. The album was digitally re-mastered by Peter Moore (Cowboy Junkies), and featured a new artwork layout created by artist Orion Landau. The CD version of Warpig was released by Relapse in October 2006.

Thomas "Dana" Snitch died in March 2021.

Terry Brett died in July 2025.

== Discography ==
=== Album ===
- Warpig (originally released by Fonthill Records in 1972; re-released by London Records in 1973, and then re-released in 2006 on Relapse)

=== Single ===
- Rock Star/Flaggit (released by London Records in 1973, both tracks are different versions)
