= Bang (American band) =

American rock band

- Origin: Philadelphia, Pennsylvania, U.S.
- Genres: Hard rock; heavy metal; occult rock
- Years active: 1969–present
- Label: Capitol
- Members: Frank Ferrara; Frank Gilcken; Tony Diorio
- Past members: Matt Calvarese; Jake Leger; Bruce Gary
- Website: bangmusic.com

Bang is an American rock band from Philadelphia, Pennsylvania, active briefly in the early 1970s and again since 2014.

== History ==
The group was formed by drummer Tony Diorio, bassist/singer Frank Ferrara, and guitarist Frank Gilcken and released three albums on Capitol Records, scoring one minor hit single with "Questions", which reached number 90 on the Billboard Hot 100. They were strongly influenced by Black Sabbath, and are considered forerunners to the doom metal genre.

The group briefly reformed in the early 2000s and recorded two more albums.

In 2004, the concept album Death of a Country was released on CD and LP. This album was recorded in 1971 and was intended to be released as the band's first record, but was shelved by Capitol Records because they did not feel that putting out a "heavy concept album" as the band's debut would be commercially viable. Later that year, their self-titled sophomore record was released and became their official debut instead.

On January 6, 2014, Bang announced their reunion. Original drummer and lyricist Tony Diorio continues to contribute lyrics, while Matt Calvarese performed drums live. In 2016 Bang toured Europe for the first time, including Roadburn Festival.

On August 15, 2017, Bang released their autobiography entitled The BANG Story: From the Basement to the Bright Lights, written with Lawrence Knorr. The book was published by Sunbury Press.

== Band members ==
Current

- Frank Ferrara – vocals, bass
- Frank Gilcken – guitar, backing vocals
- Tony Diorio – drums

Past

- Matt Calvarese – drums (2013–2014)
- Jake Leger – drums (2014–2016)

== Discography ==
=== Albums ===
- Death of a Country (recorded 1971, released 2004 on Rise Above Records)
- Bang (Capitol Records, 1972) U.S. #164
- Mother/Bow to the King (Capitol, 1972)
- Music (Capitol, 1973)
- Return to Zero (2000)
- The Maze (2004)
- Another Me (2023)

=== Charted singles ===
- "Questions" (Bang, 1972) U.S. #90
