= Heavy metal music before 1970 =

Since the dawn of rock music in the 1950s and continuing through the 1960s, various artists pushed the boundaries of the genre to emphasize speed, aggression, volume, theatricality and other elements that became staples of the heavy metal style. In the late 1960s, this experimentation coalesced into various rock subgenres like hard rock, acid rock, psychedelic rock, power pop, shock rock, boogie rock, garage rock, blues rock, and rockabilly. which were all influential in the development of heavy metal. These albums would later be retroactively categorized as Proto-metal.

Heavy metal itself only became a distinct genre around 1964–70.

Blue Cheer, Vanilla Fudge, Iron Butterfly, High Tide, The Beatles, and The Who have been described as structurally more important to metal's development than the early Led Zeppelin albums. In 1968, The Beatles' "Helter Skelter", in 1969, King Crimson's "21st Century Schizoid Man" and Pink Floyd's "The Nile Song".

Preceded by none	Heavy Metal Timeline; Pre-1970	Succeeded by 1970
