= Buffalo (band) =

Australian rock band

- Origin: Sydney, New South Wales, Australia
- Genres: Hard rock; heavy metal; psychedelic rock; pub rock
- Years active: 1971–1977
- Labels: Phonogram, Vertigo, Raven, Aztec
- Past members: Paul Balbi; John Baxter; Alan Milano; Dave Tice; Peter Wells; Jimmy Economou; Norm Roue; Karl Taylor; Colin Stead; Chris Turner; Ross Sims

Buffalo was an Australian rock band formed in August 1971 by founding mainstay Dave Tice on lead vocals (ex-Head). Fellow founders, also from Head, were Paul Balbi on drums, John Baxter on guitar, and Peter Wells on bass guitar; together with Alan Milano on lead vocals (ex-Mandala). Milano left after their debut album, Dead Forever... (June 1972), and Balbi was replaced on drums by Jimmy Economou. Their next two albums, Volcanic Rock (July 1973) and Only Want You for Your Body (June 1974), were also issued by Vertigo Records.

After 1975 line-up changes resulted in a more commercial sound and the group disbanded in March 1977. Australian musicologist Ian McFarlane noted that there was "nothing subtle about Buffalo's primal, heavyweight sound, but it was delivered with a great deal of conviction ... combining the dense, heavy riffing ... with the progressive blues chops ... the band certainly captured the arrogant disposition of the times in a bold and thunderous fashion". Alongside Billy Thorpe & The Aztecs and Blackfeather, Buffalo pioneered Australia's heavy metal, pub rock and psychedelic rock movements. Peter Wells died on 27 March 2006, aged 58.

== History ==
Buffalo were an Australian hard rock band formed in August 1971 in Sydney by founding mainstay Dave Tice on co-lead vocals (ex-Head). Fellow founders, also from Brisbane's blues-rockers Head, were Paul Balbi on drums, John Baxter on guitar, and Peter Wells on bass guitar. Tice and Wells had been together in groups since 1966 with The Odd Colours and Strange Brew before forming Head in 1968. Head had relocated to Sydney in mid-1970, its line-up changed with the acquisition of Alan Milano on co-lead vocals (ex-Mandala) and a new musical direction led to the name change. 'Buffalo' was chosen (according to legend, randomly off an Australian map) as being more marketable than 'Head', with its sexual and drug connotations. Alongside Billy Thorpe & The Aztecs and Blackfeather, Buffalo pioneered Australia's heavy metal, pub rock and alternative rock movements. Buffalo were the first Australian act to be signed to Vertigo Records, however they remained largely an underground band.

In May 1972 they issued their debut single, "Suzie Sunshine", which was written by Baxter and Peter Brett. It was followed in the next month by their debut album, Dead Forever..., which was produced by Spencer Lee. Both the single and album sold well with the album sales reaching 25,000. This was despite commercial radio virtually blacklisting the band – they received little airplay prior to the emergence of public radio stations (such as Triple J and 3RRR) in the mid-1970s. Australian musicologist, Ian McFarlane, described the album's cover as "controversial" in that it depicted "a mournful, blood-soaked face peering through the eye socket of a skull" while buyers were advised to "Play this album LOUD". After Dead Forever... appeared, Milano left, and Jimmy Economou replaced Balbi on drums. In mid-January 1973 Buffalo supported Black Sabbath at two Sydney shows on the Australian leg of the United Kingdom heavy rockers' Volume IV Tour. According to Australian rock music journalist, Ed Nimmervoll, "The seeds for Australian heavy rock can be traced back to two important sources, Billy Thorpe's Seventies Aztecs and Sydney band Buffalo, who came from the Black Sabbath/Uriah Heep school, and were signed to the same label as those groups (Vertigo) in Australia".

The four-piece line-up of Baxter, Economou, Tice and Wells recorded their next two albums, Volcanic Rock (July 1973) and Only Want You For Your Body (June 1974), with Lee producing again. AllMusic's Eduardo Rivadavia found their second album was "about as raw as heavy metal got in the early 1970s" and "all of its crudity was absolutely intentional". He felt that their third album had the group "honing their songwriting into far more focused and compact heavy rock nuggets". McFarlane stated that the band had "kept up the scorching, heavy metal mayhem, with Baxter's savage guitar work and Tice's demented vocals well to the fore" for both albums. The group's talent manager was Sebastian Chase. Their use of controversial cover artwork continued: Volcanic Rock has a "graphic yet hilarious depiction of the female form as a menstruating volcano" while Only Want You For Your Body has an "obese, screaming woman shackled to a torture rack". Some record chains refused to stock these albums. By mid-1974 Norm Roue (ex-Band of Light) had joined on slide guitar and later that year Baxter was fired from the group. McFarlane declared they had "lost one of its most valuable and distinctive assets and its spirit simply dwindled".

During 1975 Karl Taylor joined on guitar and a change of music direction – towards more commercially oriented hard rock to attain greater radio airplay – followed with their next album, Mother's Choice, appearing in March 1976. Steve Danno-Lorkin at I-94 Bar website felt it was "a big move forward with the times, more traditional in the song structuring and the lyric topics"; whereas a second reviewer, The Barman, described the same album, "starts with a bang ... before slowing to a plod ... the music drags rather than seizes the moment". The line-up and direction changes continued with Roue and Taylor replaced by Chris Turner (ex-Drain) on guitar and, briefly, Chris Stead was their second guitarist. Wells left before the end of the year to form another hard rock group, Rose Tattoo. Wells had "decided to form the band that became Rose Tattoo, decided on their style of boogie and blues music, and their street look, united by their tattooed bodies".

Buffalo disbanded in March 1977 when Tice travelled to London to join local rock group, The Count Bishops alongside his former bandmate, Balbi. Late the previous year, Tice and latter day Buffalo members: Economou, Turner and Ross Sims on bass guitar, had recorded a final studio album, Average Rock 'n' Roller, which appeared in July 1977. McFarlane was disappointed with "Buffalo's attempt at a more commercial sound, but [it] lacked the coherent direction of their predecessors". Danno-Lorkin felt it was "very self indulgent" and "tracks on this don’t work quite so well as instrumentally they seems a bit lacking in direction or purpose". The Barman noted that despite its title it was "well above average" and is "more a rock effort than the blues/boogie-fuelled Mother's Choice".

McFarlane noted that there was "nothing subtle about Buffalo's primal, heavyweight sound, but it was delivered with a great deal of conviction ... combining the dense, occult riffing ... with the progressive blues chops ... the band certainly captured the arrogant disposition of the times in a bold and thunderous fashion". Buffalo pre-dated other early Australian hard rockers: Coloured Balls (formed March 1972), AC/DC (late 1973), The Angels (1974, as The Keystone Angels), and Rose Tattoo (late 1976). Like many pioneering heavy metal acts, Buffalo incorporated strong influences of blues-rock and psychedelic rock. The band toured across Australia, at venues ranging from school dances in tiny halls to large outdoor concerts. Heavy Planet website considers Buffalo to anticipate doom metal and stoner rock.

== Breakup and subsequent projects ==
After Buffalo disbanded, several members went on to other projects. Peter Wells formed Rose Tattoo, playing both slide and bass guitar, he also had a solo career. Peter Wells died on 27 March 2006, aged 58. Dave Tice went to the UK to join The Count Bishops (alongside Paul Balbi) but returned to Australia to work as a solo artist and as a member of The Headhunters. As of July 2005, he was playing with ex-AC/DC bass guitarist Mark Evans as Tice & Evans.

== Members ==
- Paul Balbi – drums (1971–1972)
- John Baxter – guitar (1971–1974)
- Alan Milano – co-lead vocals (1971–1972)
- Dave Tice – lead vocals (1971–1977)
- Peter Wells – bass guitar (1971–1976)
- Jimmy Economou – drums (1972–1977)
- Norm Roue – slide guitar (1974–1976)
- Karl Taylor – guitar (1975–1976)
- Colin Stead – guitar (1976)
- Chris Turner – guitar (1976–1977)
- Ross Sims – bass guitar (1976–1977)

== Discography ==
=== Studio albums ===
List of albums, with selected chart positions
Title	Album details	Peak chart positions
Title	Album details	AUS
Dead Forever...	Released: June 1972; Label: Phonogram Records/Vertigo Records (6357 007	47
Volcanic Rock	Released: July 1973; Label: Vertigo Records (6357 101)	33
Only Want You for Your Body	Released: November 1974; Label: Vertigo Records (6357 102)	61
Mother's Choice	Released: February 1976; Label: Vertigo Records (6357 103)	96
Average Rock 'n' Roller	Released: June 1977; Label: Vertigo Records (6357 104)	92

=== Compilation albums ===
- Rock Legends: Buffalo – (1980) Vertigo Records (6479 325)
- Skirt Lifters: Highlights & Oversights 1972-1976 – (1989) Raven Records (RVLP-37)

=== Extended plays ===
- Buffalo (June 1974) Vertigo Records (6237 001)

=== Singles ===
- "Suzie Sunshine" (1972)
- "Just a Little Rock 'n' Roll" (1973)
- "Sunrise (Come My Way)" (1973)
- "What's Going On" (1974)
- "Little Queenie" (1975)
- "Lucky" (1975)
- "Sweet Little Sixteen" (1976)
- "Rollin'" (1976)
- "Sailor" (1977)
