= Mammalian reproduction =

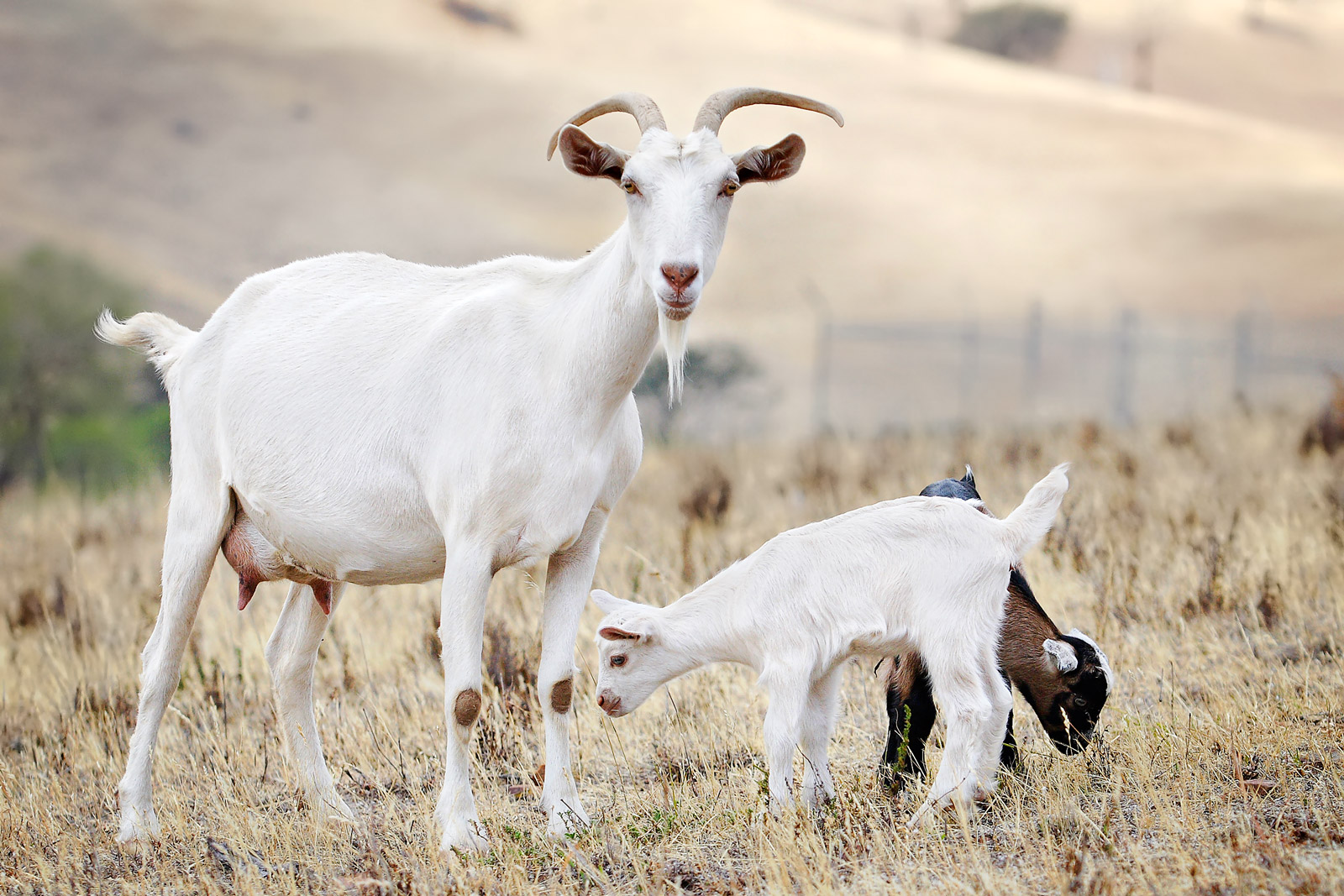
Goat kids will stay with their mother until they are weaned.

Most mammals are viviparous, giving birth to live young. However, the five species of monotreme, the platypuses and the echidnas, lay eggs. The monotremes have a sex determination system different from that of most other mammals. In particular, the sex chromosomes of a platypus are more like those of a chicken than those of a therian mammal.

The mammary glands of mammals are specialized to produce milk, a liquid used by newborns as their primary source of nutrition. The monotremes branched early from other mammals and do not have the teats seen in most mammals, but they do have mammary glands. The young lick the milk from a mammary patch on the mother's belly.

Viviparous mammals are in the subclass Theria; those living today are in the Marsupialia and Placentalia infraclasses. A marsupial has a short gestation period, typically shorter than its estrous cycle, and gives birth to an underdeveloped (altricial) newborn that then undergoes further development; in many species, this takes place within a pouch-like sac, the marsupium, located in the front of the mother's abdomen. Some placentals, e.g. guinea pig, give birth to fully developed (precocial) young, usually after long gestation periods, while some others, e.g. mouse, give birth to underdeveloped young.

== Maturity and reproductive age ==
Sexual maturity and thus the earliest age at which mammals can reproduce varies dramatically across species. Members of the rodent family Cricetidae can reach sexual maturity in 1–2 months, e.g. the Norway lemming (Lemmus lemmus) in 39 days. Many dogs (family Canidae) and bovids (Bovidae) take about a year to reach maturity while primates (including humans) and dolphins (Delphinidae) require more than 10 years. Some whales take even longer, with the longest duration being recorded for the bowhead whale (Balaena mysticetus), which reaches maturity at an age of only about 23 years. Age at sexual maturity in mammals is influenced not only by body size but also by ecological and social factors, including resource availability, population density, and social structure.

== Reproductive strategies ==
Mammals exhibit a wide range of reproductive strategies that reflect trade-offs between offspring number, parental investment, and survival. These strategies include variation in mating systems, levels of parental care, and the degree to which reproduction is concentrated among particular individuals within a population. In some species, social structure strongly influences reproductive success, with reproduction primarily limited to dominant individuals, while others adopt more egalitarian or opportunistic strategies.

In addition, reproductive strategies in mammals are often shaped by life-history trade-offs between producing many offspring with low individual investment and producing fewer offspring with higher parental investment. Species with high parental care typically exhibit lower reproductive rates but increased offspring survival, whereas species with minimal parental investment may reproduce more frequently with higher offspring mortality.

=== Reproductive timing strategies ===
Fertilization occurs within hours of insemination in most mammalians. Reproductive timing in mammals varies widely and is influenced by body size, ecological conditions, and life-history strategies. The length of gestation generally increases with body size but there are exceptions to this general trend. Larger mammals such as primates tend to have longer developmental periods and extended parental care . External factors such as seasonality, latitude, and access to resources also play a role in reproductive timing.In many species, reproductive events are synchronized with favourable environmental conditions to maximize offspring survival. Four general reproductive timing strategies are recognized in mammals: delayed fertilization, delayed development, delayed implantation, and embryonic diapause.These strategies differ in when fertilization and development take place.

Delayed fertilization occurs when sperm are stored in the female reproductive tract and fertilization is postponed until a later time. . This strategy is well documented in temperate bat species, where mating occurs in late summer or autumn, but fertilization is postponed until after hibernation in the spring. Species such as the little brown bat (Myotis lucifugus) store sperm during hibernation, allowing fertilization to occur when environmental conditions improve. This delay enables births to coincide with periods of high food availability, such as peak insect abundance in early summer.

Another strategy is delayed development, where the embryo implants normally but develops at a reduced rate over an extended period.This has been observed in several bat species, including the Jamaican fruit bat (Artibeus jamaicensis), where reproduction is timed so that young are born when food resources, such as fruit or insects, are most abundant.

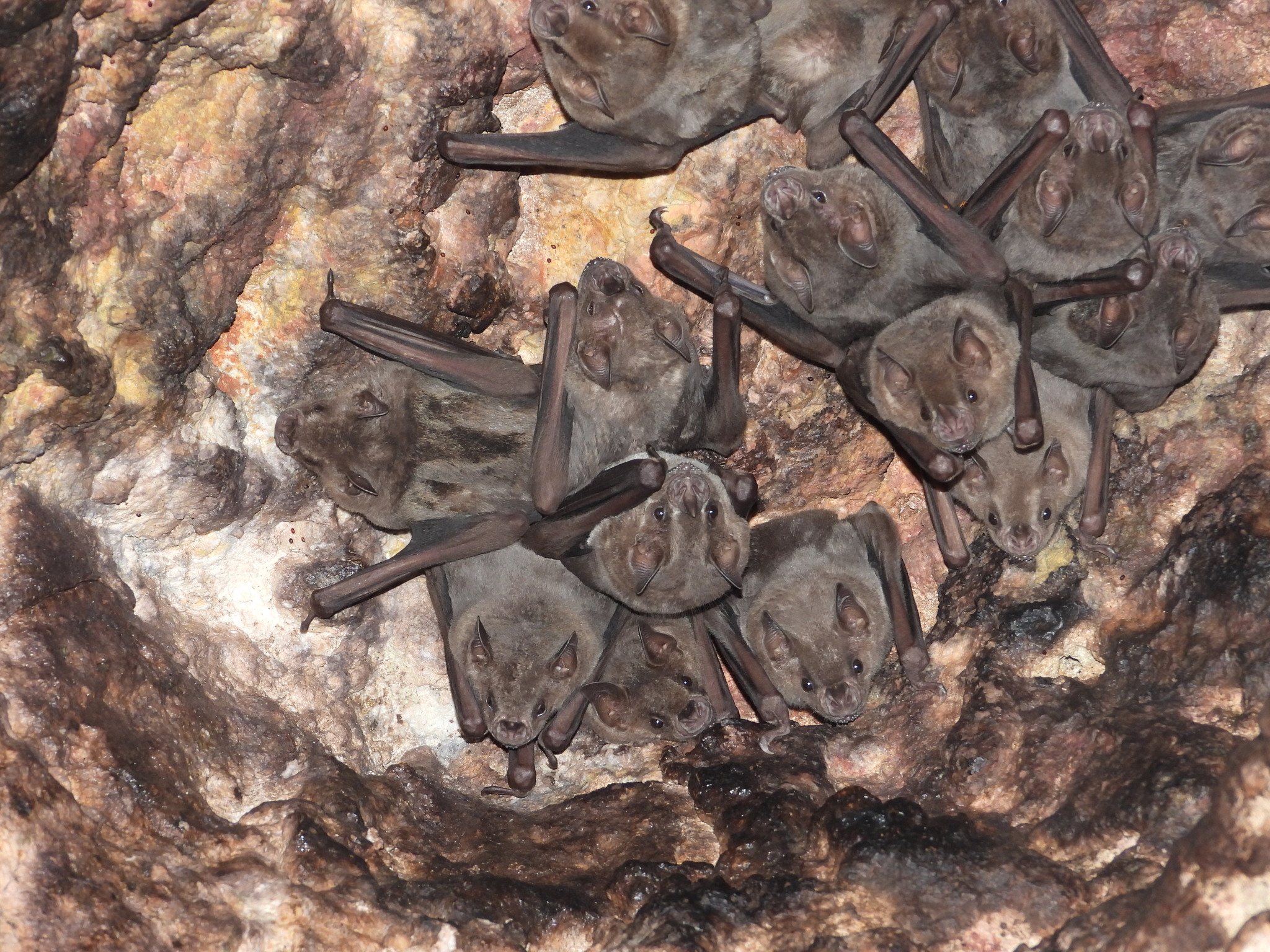
A colony of Jamaican fruit bats (Artibetus jamaicensis), a species that delays development to synchronize the birth of young at the end of the dry season.

A related mechanism is delayed implantation, in which the embryo develops to the blastocyst stage but does not immediately attach to the uterus. Instead, it remains free within the reproductive tract until conditions are suitable for continued development.This phenomenon is well documented in species such as the American black bear (Ursus americanus), where implantation is postponed so that cubs are born during winter, when mothers are in dens and able to provide protection.

In embryonic diapause, development is temporarily paused, usually at an early stage.This phenomenon occurs in several mammalian lineages, including many marsupials and numerous carnivores, and allows birth to coincide with favourable environmental conditions, such as better access to food. In species such as the Tammar wallaby (Macropus eugenii), embryonic development is paused until the blastocyst stage. During this period, embryonic development is temporarily suspended until environmental conditions become favourable, after which development resumes.

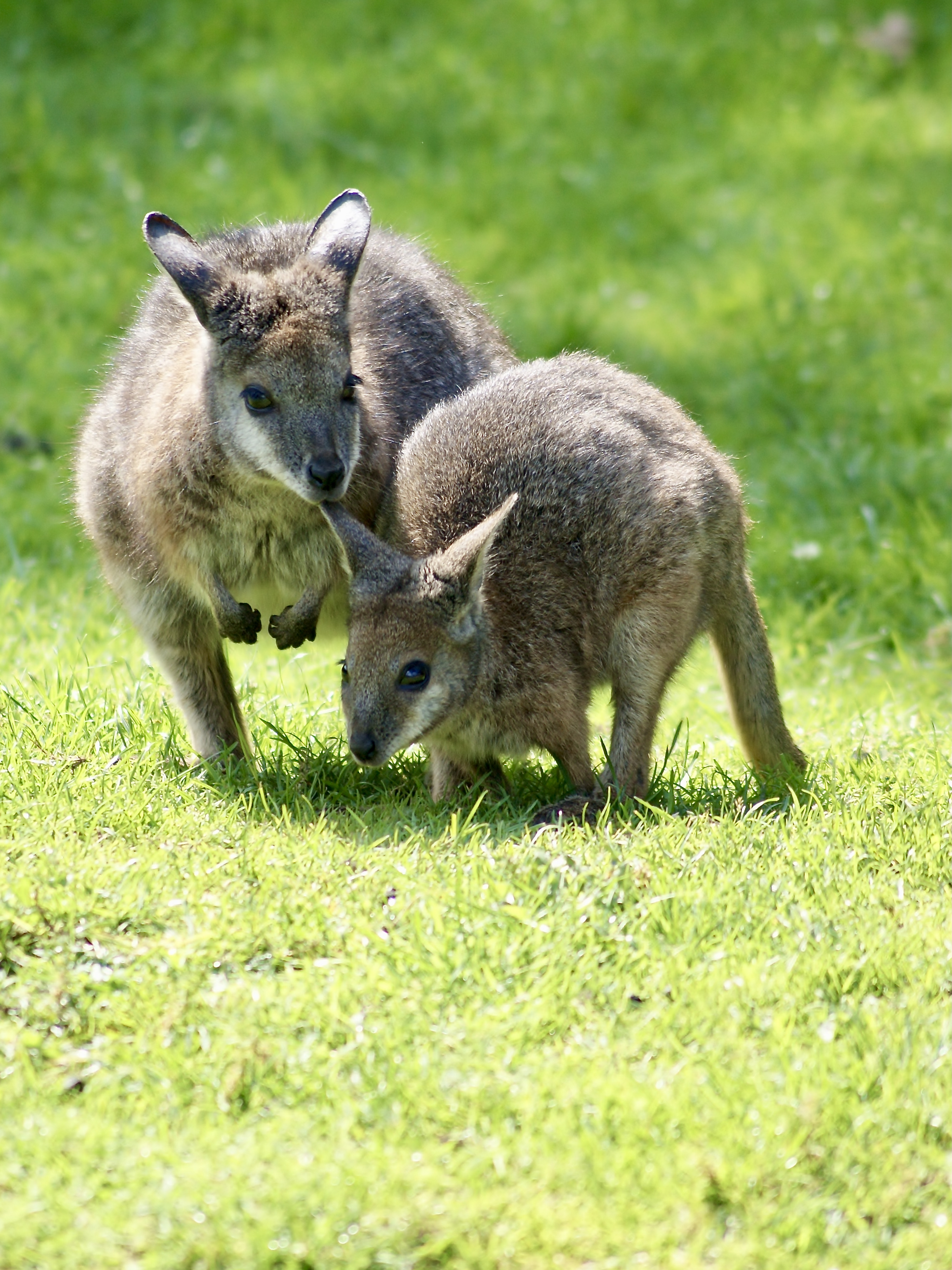
Tamar wallaby (Macropus Eugenii) exhibits the longest embryonic diapause of any mammal

=== Mating systems ===
Mammalian mating systems represent adaptive strategies reflects differences in reproductive investments under specific ecological conditions. They are broadly categorized based on the number of mates an individual has during a breeding season.

- Monogamy: One male and one female form a persistent pair bond, often cooperating to defend a territory and rear offspring. This system is relatively rare in mammals. It often evolves where male parental care is critical for offspring survive or when females are so widely dispersed that a male cannot effectively defend more than one. Social monogamy is a key prerequisite for the evolution of cooperative breeding, where non-breeding helpers assist in rearing young, as it ensures high genetic relatedness within the social group. Social monogamy is relatively rare in mammals, occurring in up to 5% of species. Prairie voles (Microtus ochrogaster) is one of the few mammalian species where stable pair bonds are formed, and both male and female care for the offspring.
- Polygyny: One male mates with multiple females. This is one of the most common mating systems in mammals, and occurs when males monopolize access to females, or maintain control of the resources that females depend on. In many species, reproductive success is highly skewed, with dominant males securing the majority of matings. Polygyny is common in mammals such as gorillas and elephant seals, where a small number of dominant males control access to groups of females, or harems. Polygyny is often associated with sexual size dimorphism, where males are visibly larger than females. Intense competition among dominant males for females favours the evolution of a larger body size, and other traits that increases the likelihood of mating success.
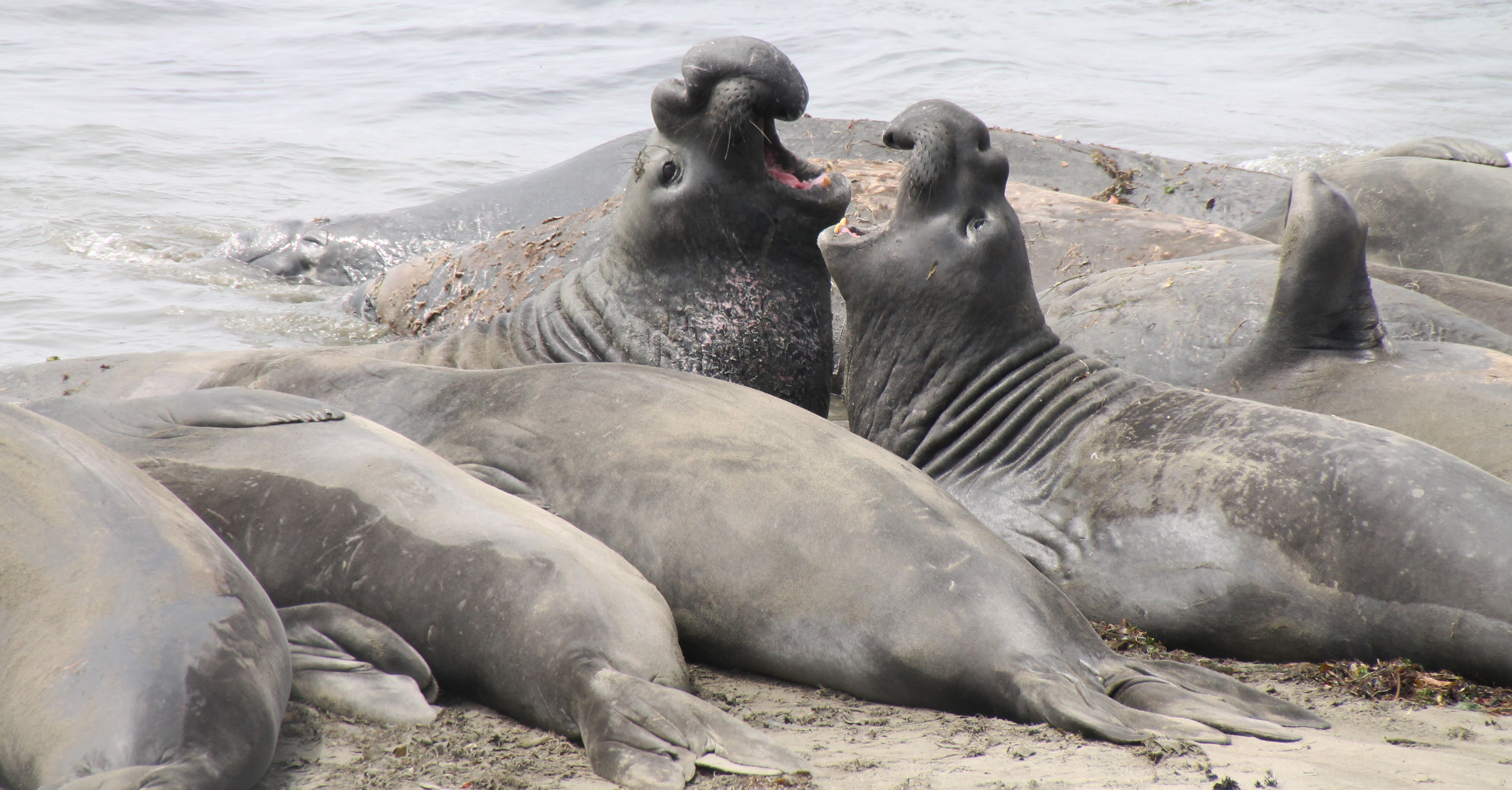
  Male elephant seals fighting for access to females
- Promiscuity: Both males and females mate with multiple partners without forming lasting pair bonds. This system is common in species where females live in large populations. It is often associated with high levels of sperm competition, leading to the evolution to relatively larger testes in males. In species with multi-male mating systems, sperm competition can strongly influence male reproductive strategies. Increased sperm competition has been linked to the evolution of larger testes size, and altered mating behaviour.
- Lekking: In a lek mating system, males gather in traditional display areas to perform courtship displays and compete for the attention of females. This rare system is seen in some ungulates, such as the fallow deer and Uganda kob. This system emerges from simple, local interactions between males, such as attraction to a traditional site, mid-range attraction to each other, and short-range repulsion for territory defenses.

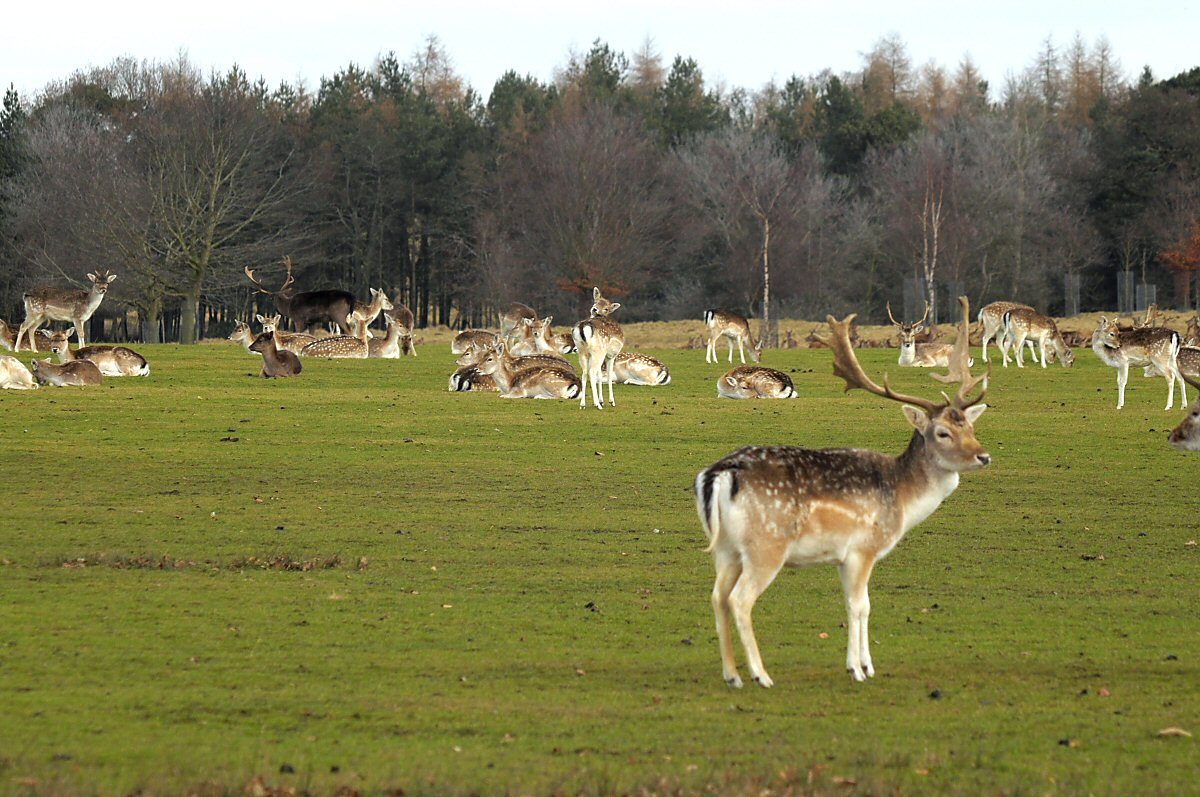
Herd of fallow deer

=== Evolutionary and ecological drivers ===
Sexual selection plays a central role in shaping mammalian mating systems. Differences in male and female reproductive investment often lead to sex-specific competition and mate choice, driving the evolution of traits such as sexual dimorphism and courtship behaviour.

The type of mating system that evolves in a mammal species is primarily determined by the interaction of social distribution of females and the defensibility of those females or the resource they need. While ecology is a major driver, phylogenetic analyses show that shared evolutionary history also plays a significant role in constraining or facilitating transitions between different mating systems.

Male infanticide, in which incoming males kill dependent offspring that they did not sire, has also been proposed as an important selective pressure influencing mating systems. Some males would also engage in infanticide to bring back females into estrus, thereby increasing the chances of siring offspring. Evidence suggests that this behaviour is thought to have evolved in response to competitive pressures, particularly male-biased sex ratios, with traits like increased testes size emerging as a byproduct rather than a cause. Sexual selective pressures influence the structure of mating systems, often driving females to form stable associations with males to reduce the risk of infanticide, potentially promoting social monogamy. Some researchers have criticised that a focus on male-male competition may come at the cost of underrepresenting female choice and adaptive strategies in shaping mating systems.

== Reproductive system ==
In many social animals, reproduction is often restricted to a dominant breeding pair, while subordinate individuals may experience behavioural or physiological reproductive suppression. In socially structured mammals, reproductive suppression may be mediated by neuroendocrine mechanisms, including stress-induced inhibition of the hypothalamic–pituitary–gonadal axis.

=== Placental mammals ===
==== Male placentals ====
The mammalian male reproductive system contains two main divisions, the penis and the testicles, the latter of which are where sperm are produced and usually held in a scrotum. In humans, both of these organs are outside the abdominal cavity, but they can be primarily housed within the abdomen in other animals. For instance, a dog's penis is covered by a penile sheath except when mating. Having the testicles outside the abdomen best facilitates temperature regulation of the sperm, which require specific temperatures to survive. The external location may also cause a reduction in the heat-induced contribution to the spontaneous mutation rate in male germinal tissue. Sperm are the smaller of the two gametes and are generally very short-lived, requiring males to produce them continuously from the time of sexual maturity until death. The produced sperm are stored in the epididymides until ejaculation through the vasa deferentia. The sperm cells are motile and they swim using tail-like flagella to propel themselves towards the ovum. The sperm follows temperature gradients (thermotaxis) and chemical gradients (chemotaxis) to locate the ovum.

==== Female placentals ====
The mammalian female reproductive system contains three main divisions: the vagina and uterus, which act as the receptacle for the sperm, the ovaries, which produce the female's ova, and the vulva, which consists of the labia and clitoris. The vagina, uterus and ovaries are always internal while the vulva is external. The vagina is attached to the uterus through the cervix, while the uterus is attached to the ovaries via the oviducts. At certain intervals, the ovaries release an ovum, which passes through the oviduct into the uterus.

If, in this transit, it meets with sperm, the egg selects sperm with which to merge; this is termed fertilization. The fertilization usually occurs in the oviducts, but can happen in the uterus itself. The zygote then implants itself in the wall of the uterus, where it begins the processes of embryogenesis and morphogenesis. When developed enough to survive outside the womb, the cervix dilates and contractions of the uterus propel the fetus through the birth canal, which is the vagina.

The ova, which are the female sex cells, are much larger than the sperm and are normally formed within the ovaries of the fetus before its birth. They are mostly fixed in location within the ovary until their transit to the uterus, and contain nutrients for the later zygote and embryo. Over a regular interval, in response to hormonal signals, a process of oogenesis matures one ovum which is released and sent down the oviduct. If not fertilized, this egg is released through menstruation in humans and other great apes, and reabsorbed in other mammals in the estrus cycle.

===== Gestation =====
The initial stages of human embryogenesis

Gestation, called pregnancy in humans, is the period of time during which the fetus develops, dividing via mitosis inside the female. During this time, the fetus receives all of its nutrition and oxygenated blood from the female, filtered through the placenta, which is attached to the fetus' abdomen via an umbilical cord. This drain of nutrients can be quite taxing on the female, who is required to ingest slightly higher levels of calories. In addition, certain vitamins and other nutrients are required in greater quantities than normal, often creating abnormal eating habits. The length of gestation, called the gestation period, varies greatly from species to species; it is 40 weeks in humans, 56–60 in giraffes and 16 days in hamsters.

===== Birth =====
Once the fetus has sufficiently developed, chemical signals start the process of birth. This begins with contractions of the uterus and dilation of the cervix. The fetus then descends to the cervix, where it is pushed out into the vagina, and eventually out of the female. The newborn, which is called an infant in humans, should typically begin respiration on its own shortly after birth. Not long after, the placenta is passed as well.

====== Human births ======
Human babies are unique in the animal kingdom due to their large head size relative to their bodies. This has an effect on the birthing process for humans as the bipedal gait of a human causes the birthing canal to be relatively narrow and twisted in the middle. As a result, the vast majority of human babies must rotate inside the birth canal in order to squeeze through the birthing canal and fit through the pelvic planes. This process is known as a rotational birth, and while it is not a process unique to humans, humans are unique in that nearly all human babies undergo this process out of necessity. A primary hypothesis for why this process and others occur, causing human births to be drastically more difficult than other mammals is known as the obstetrical dilemma.

=== Monotremes ===
Monotremes, only five species of which exist, all from Australia and New Guinea, are mammals that lay eggs. They have one opening for excretion and reproduction called the cloaca. They hold the eggs internally for several weeks, providing nutrients, and then lay them and cover them like birds. Like marsupial "joeys", monotreme "puggles" are larval and fetus-like, as like them they cannot expand their torso due to the presence of epipubic bones, forcing them to produce undeveloped young.

=== Marsupials ===
Marsupials' reproductive systems differ markedly from those of placentals, though it is probably the plesiomorphic condition found in viviparous mammals, including non-placental eutherians. During embryonic development, a choriovitelline placenta forms in all marsupials. In bandicoots, an additional chorioallantoic placenta forms, although it lacks the chorionic villi found in eutherian placentas.

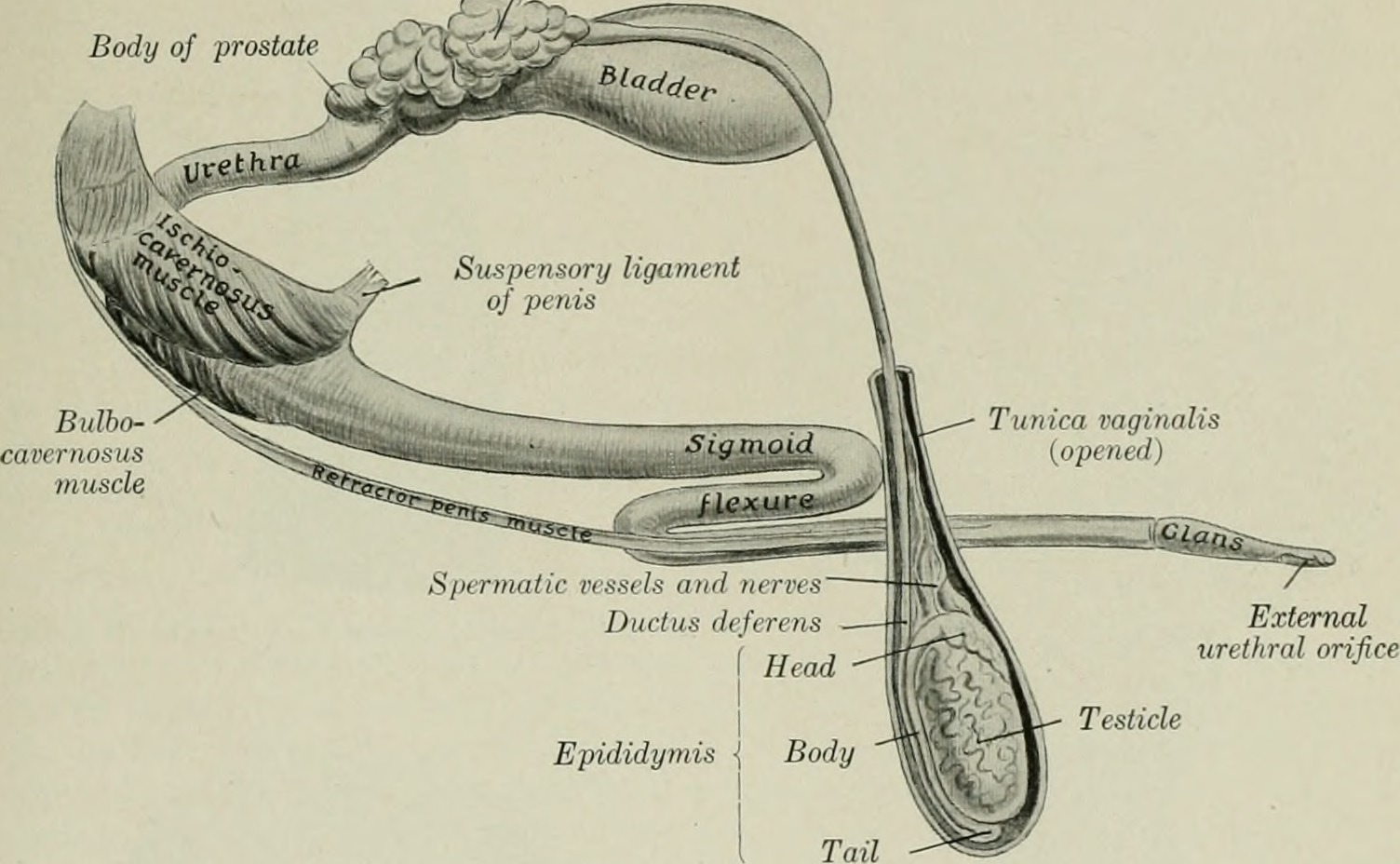
Bull

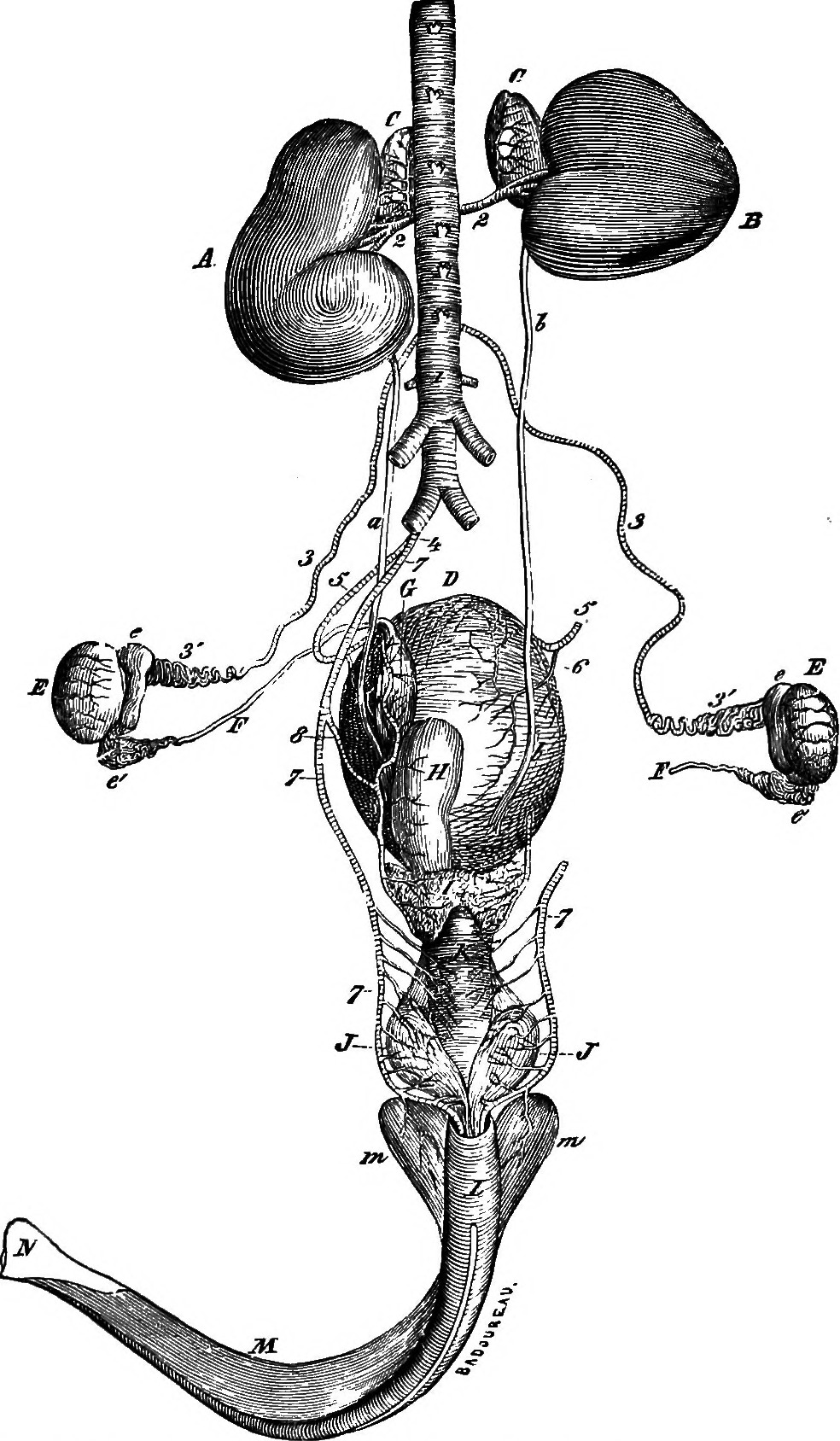
Stallion

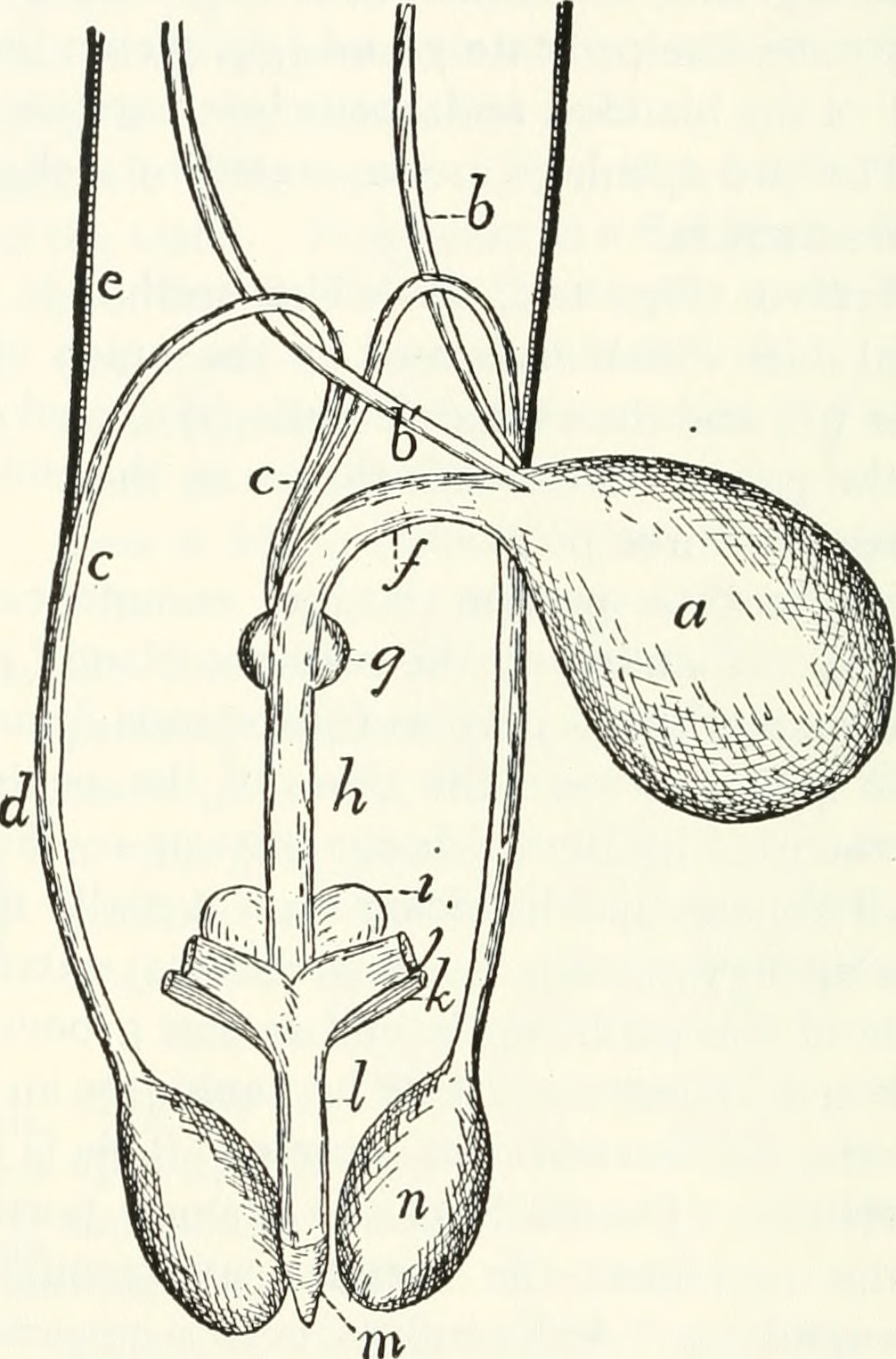
Male domestic cat

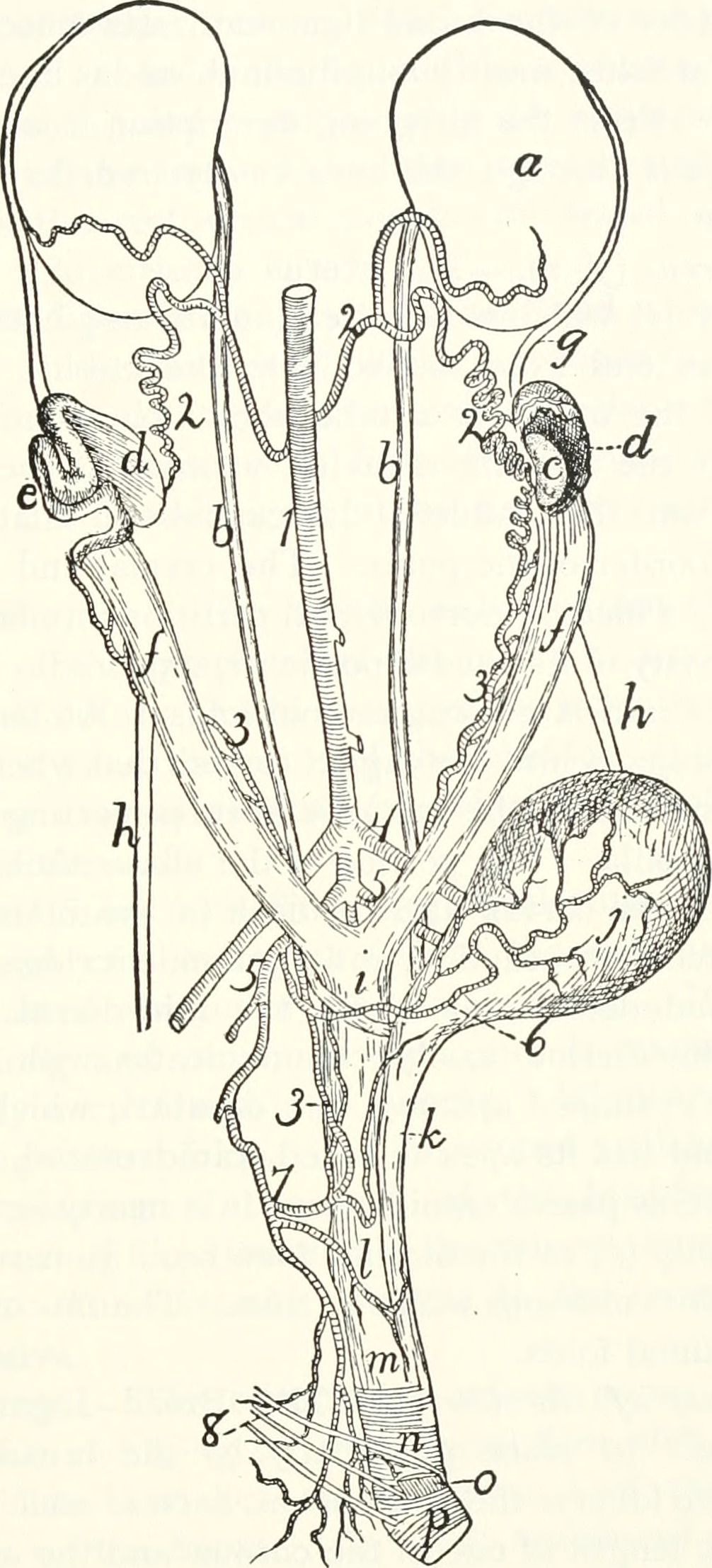
Female domestic cat

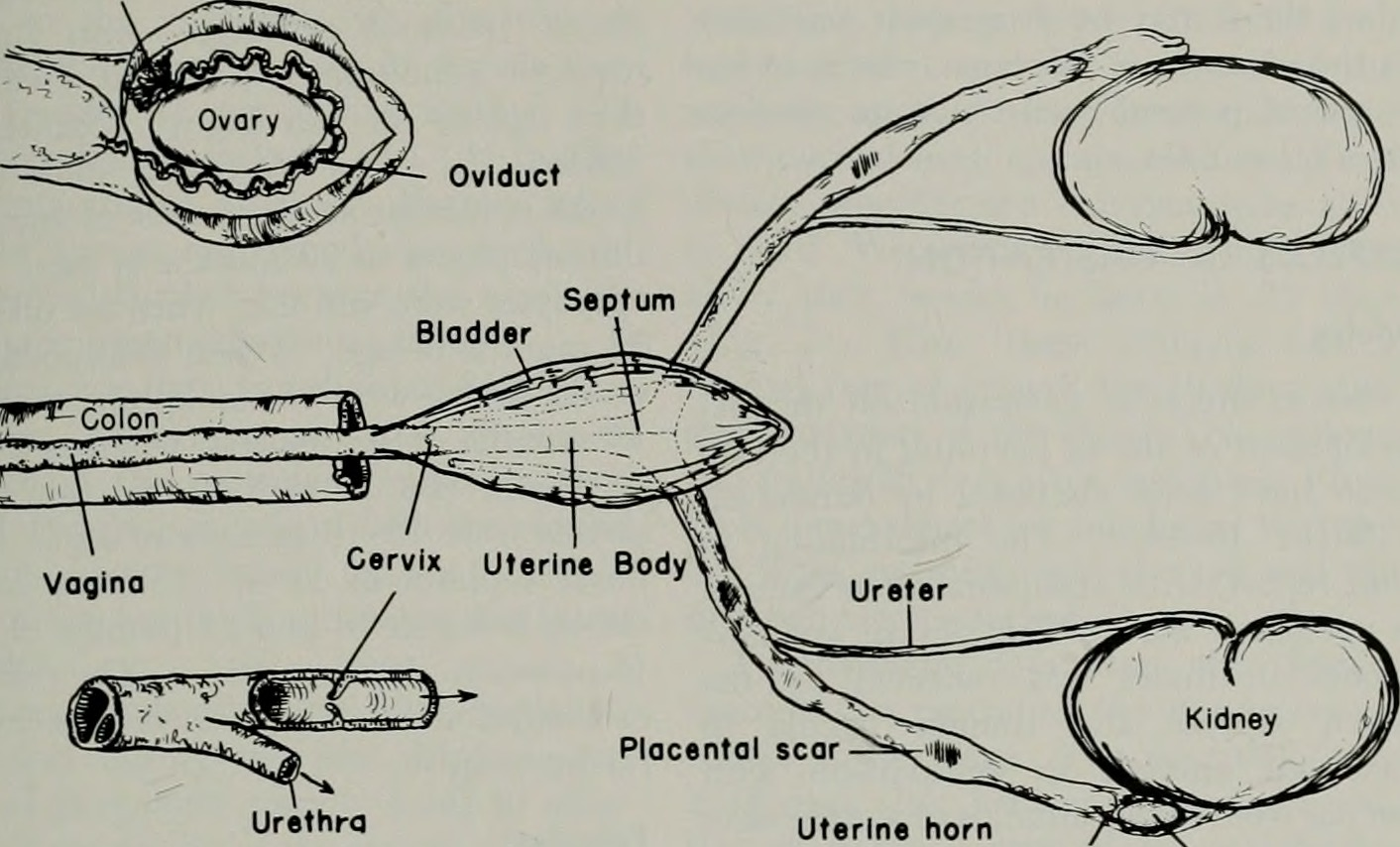
Female raccoon

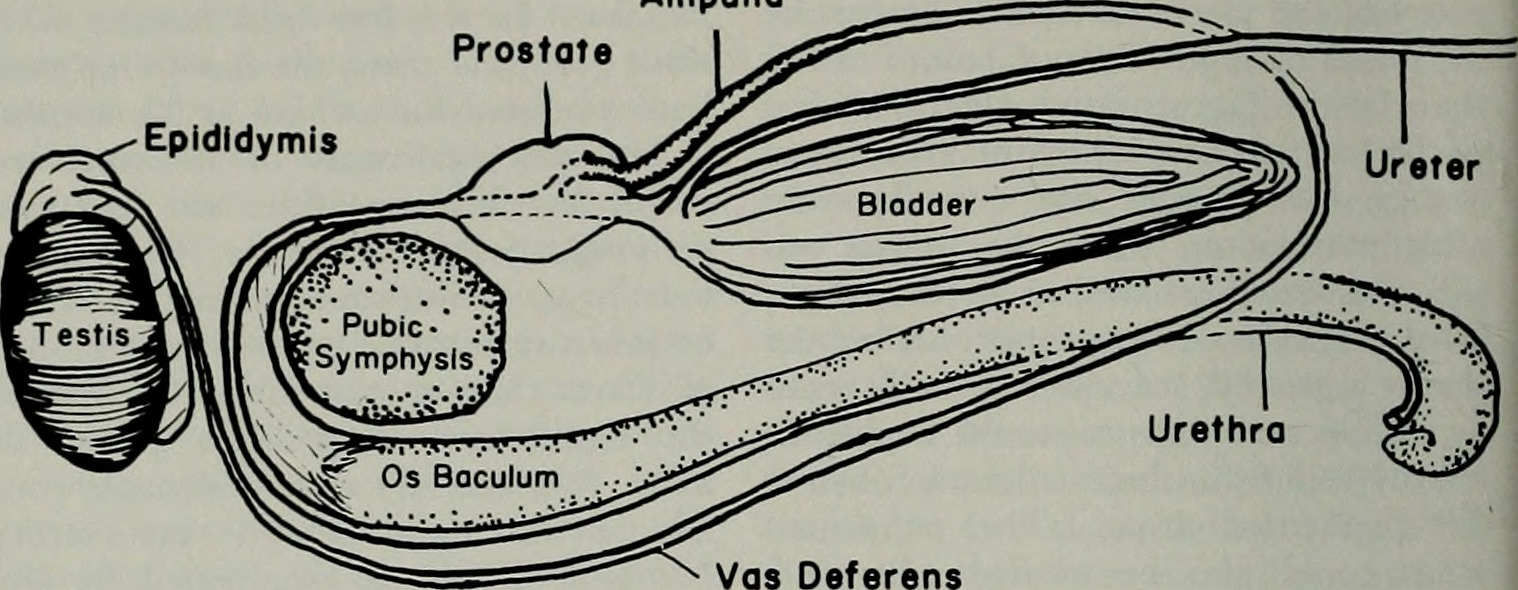
Male raccoon

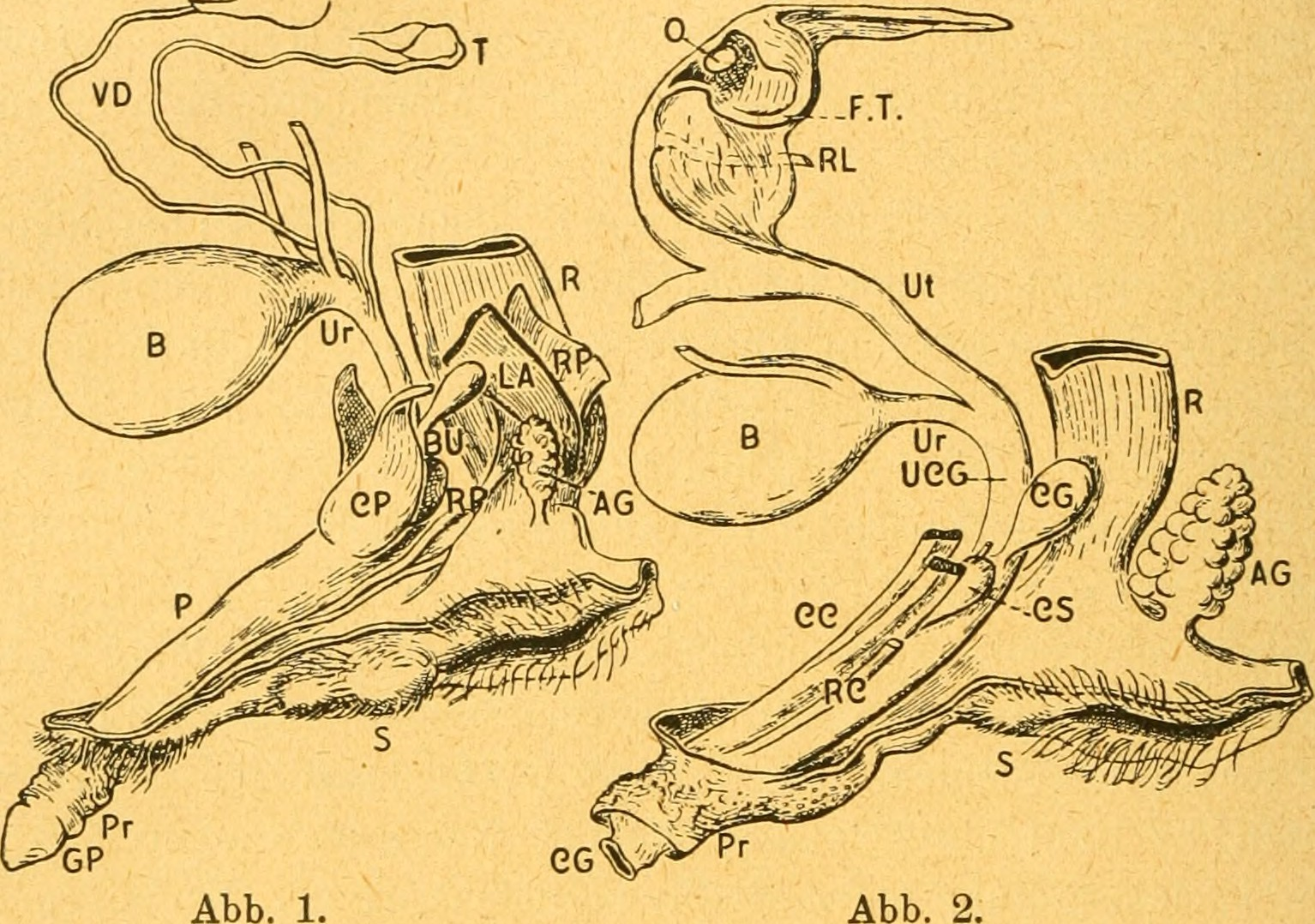
Male and female spotted hyena

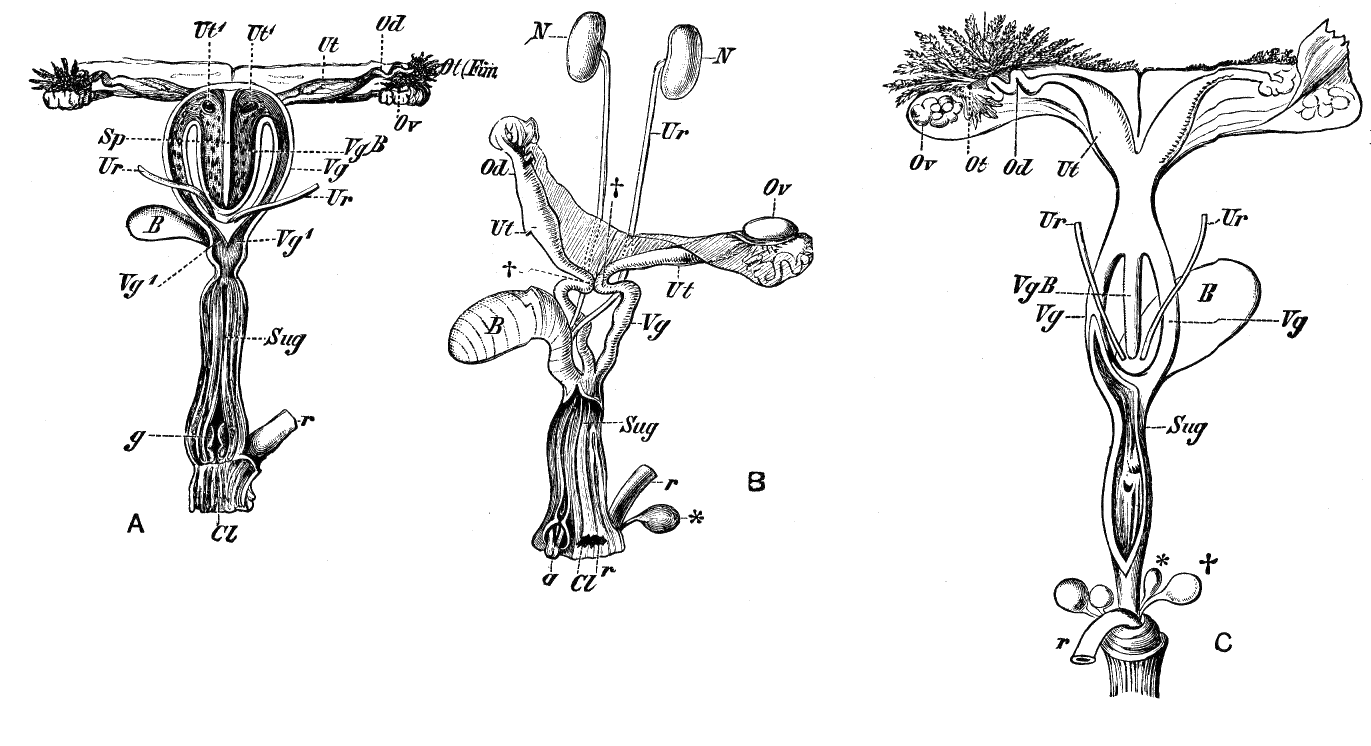
Female marsupials

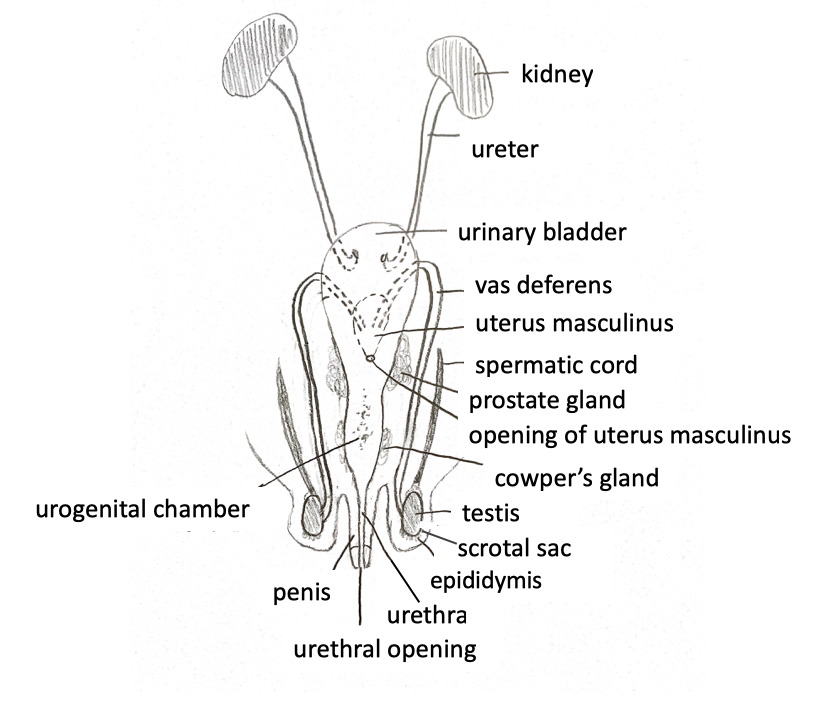
Male rabbit

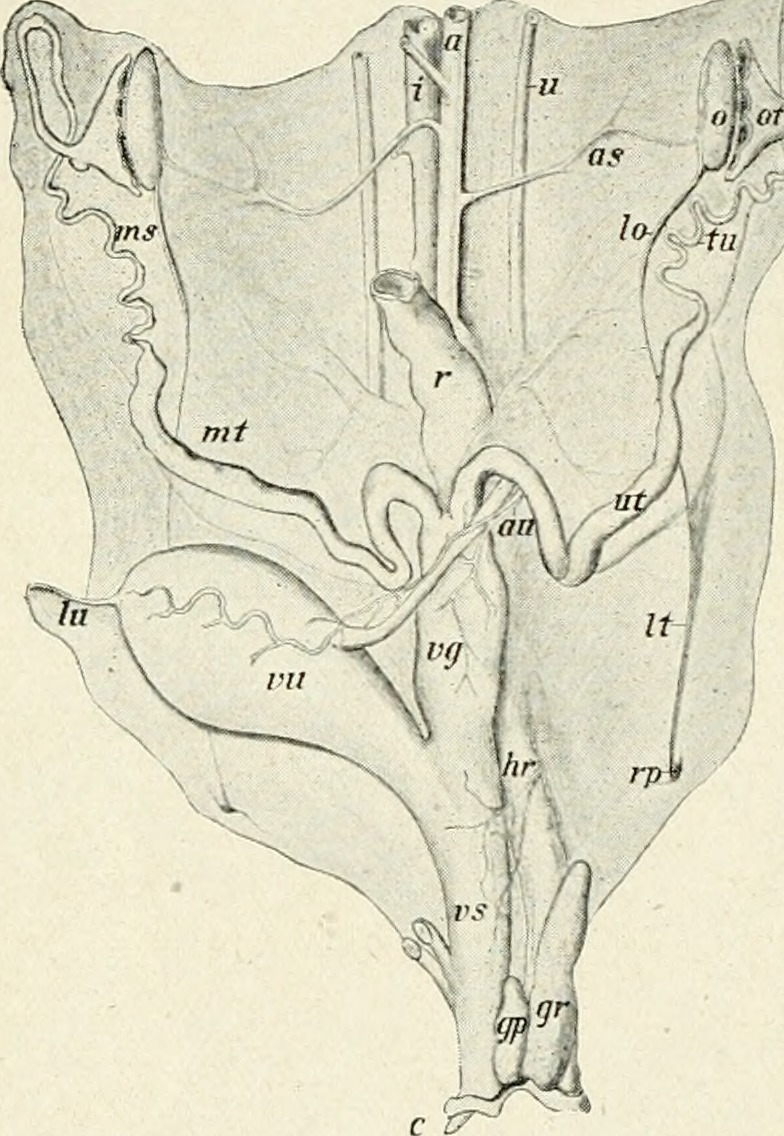
Female rabbit

== Gametogenesis ==
Animals, including mammals, produce gametes (sperm and egg) through meiosis in gonads (testicles in males and ovaries in females). Sperm are produced by the process of spermatogenesis and eggs are produced by oogenesis. These processes are outlined in the article gametogenesis. During gametogenesis in mammals many genes encoding proteins that take part in DNA repair mechanisms show enhanced or specialized expression These mechanisms include meiotic homologous recombinational repair and mismatch repair.

== Copulation ==
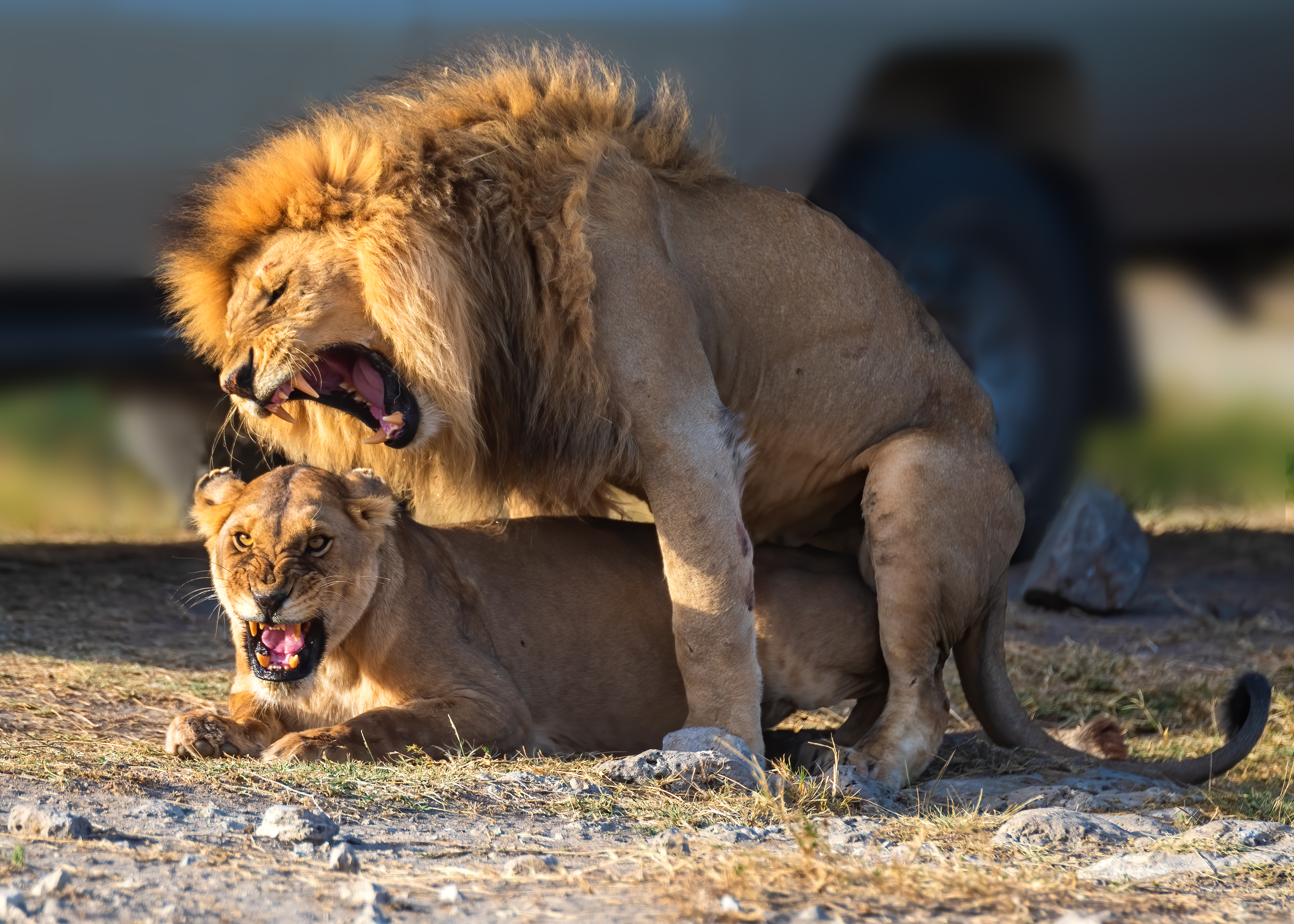
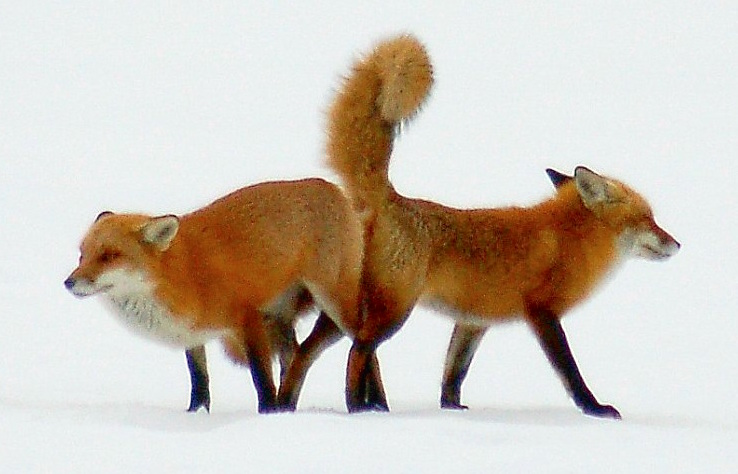
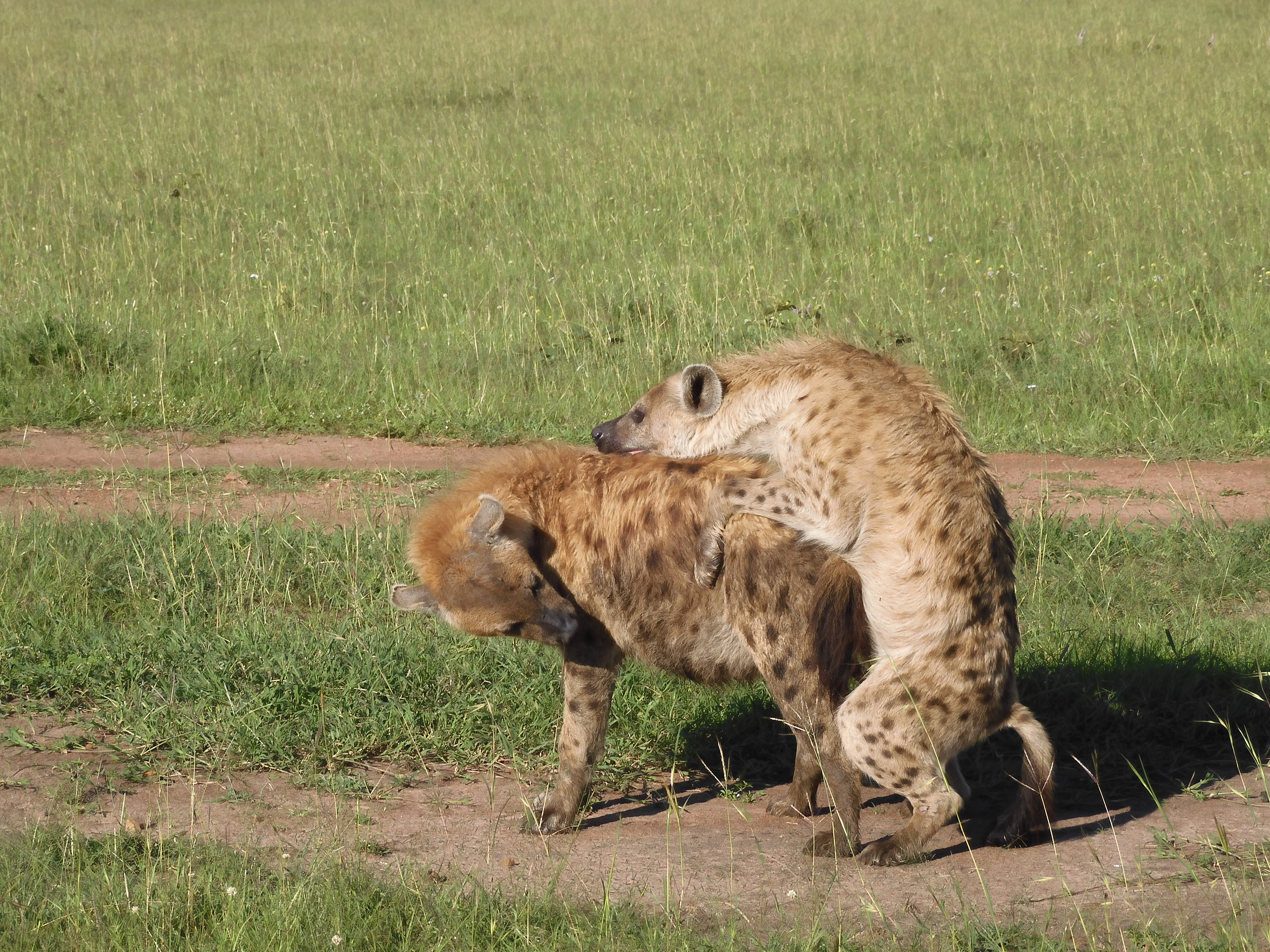
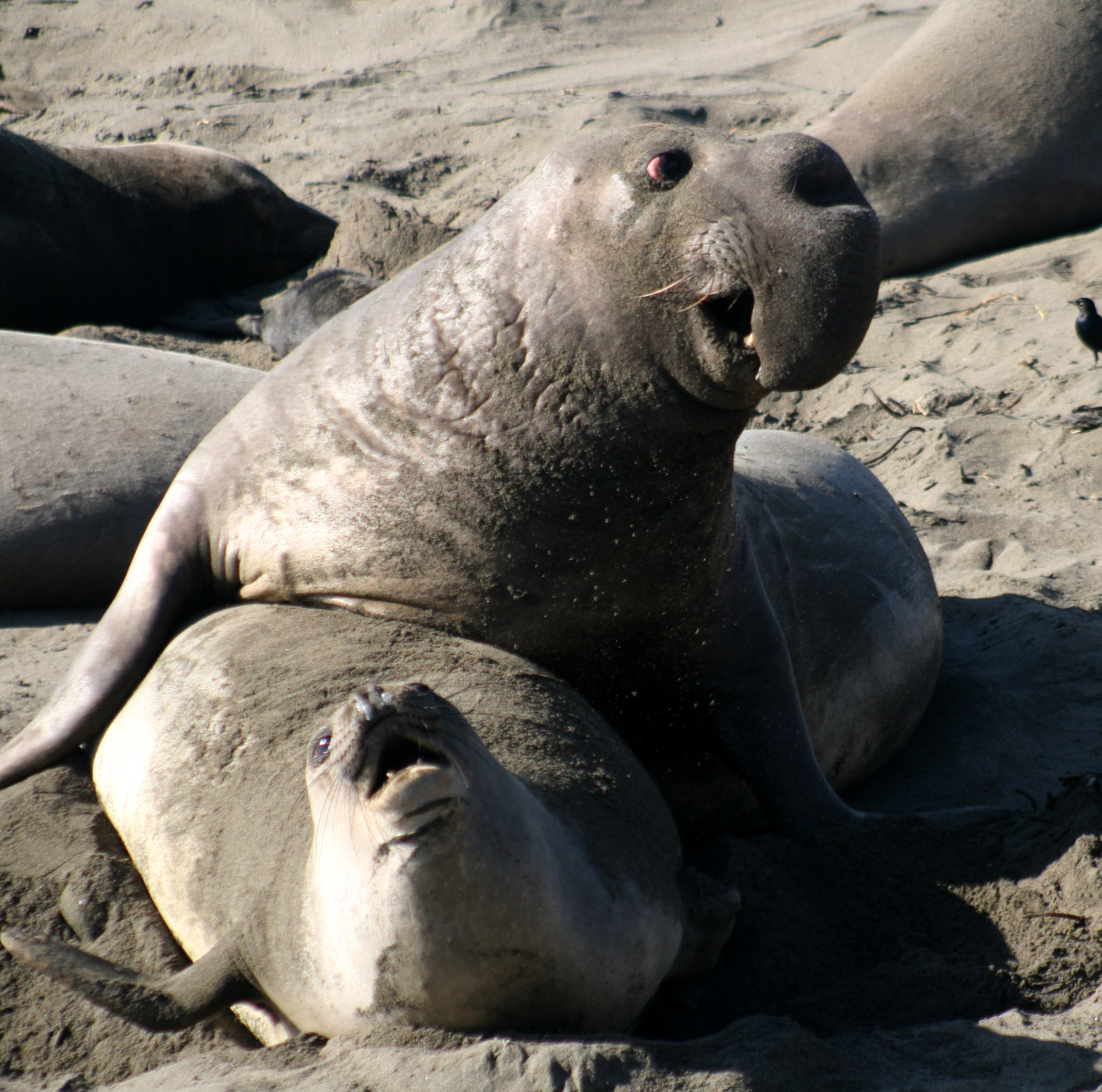
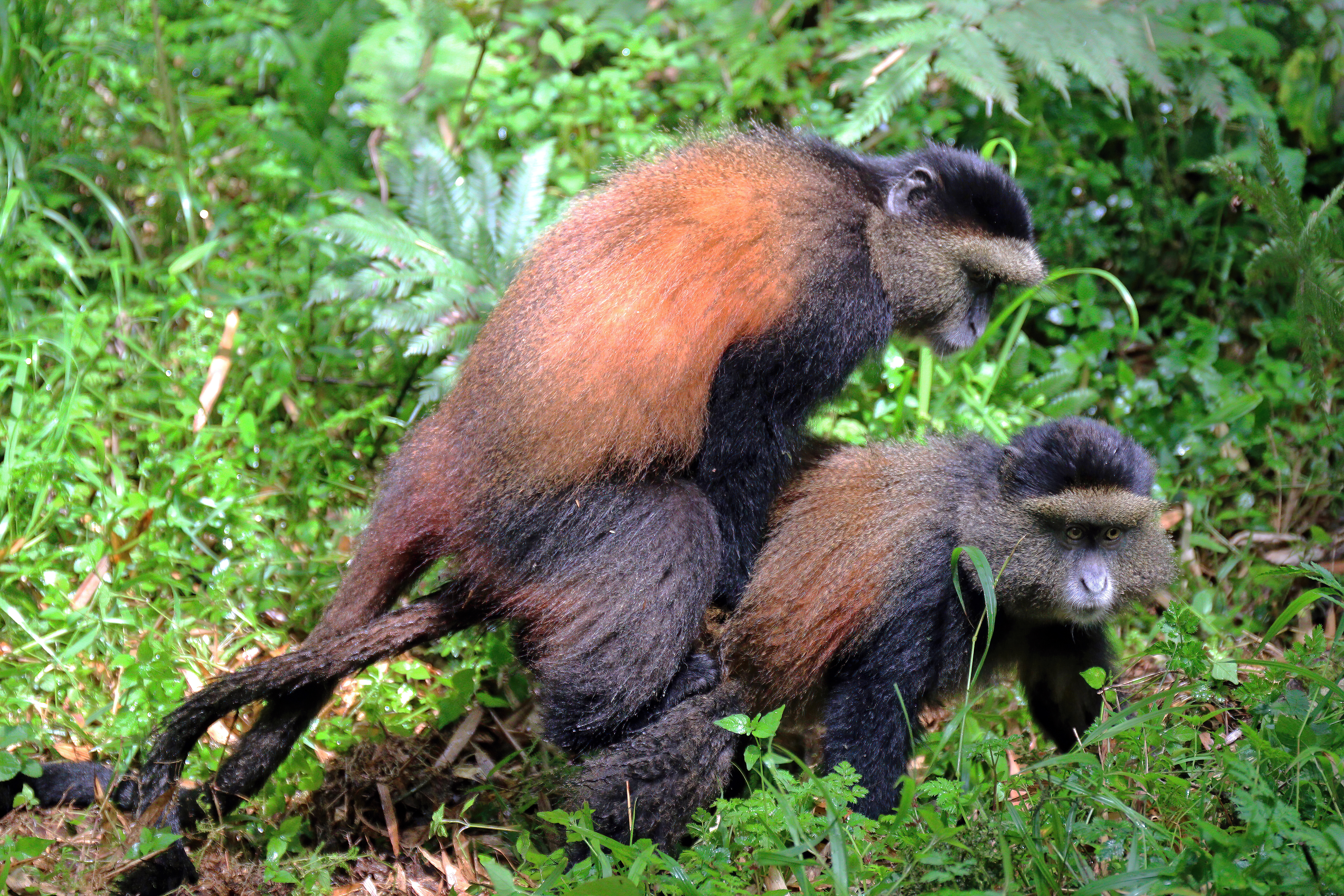
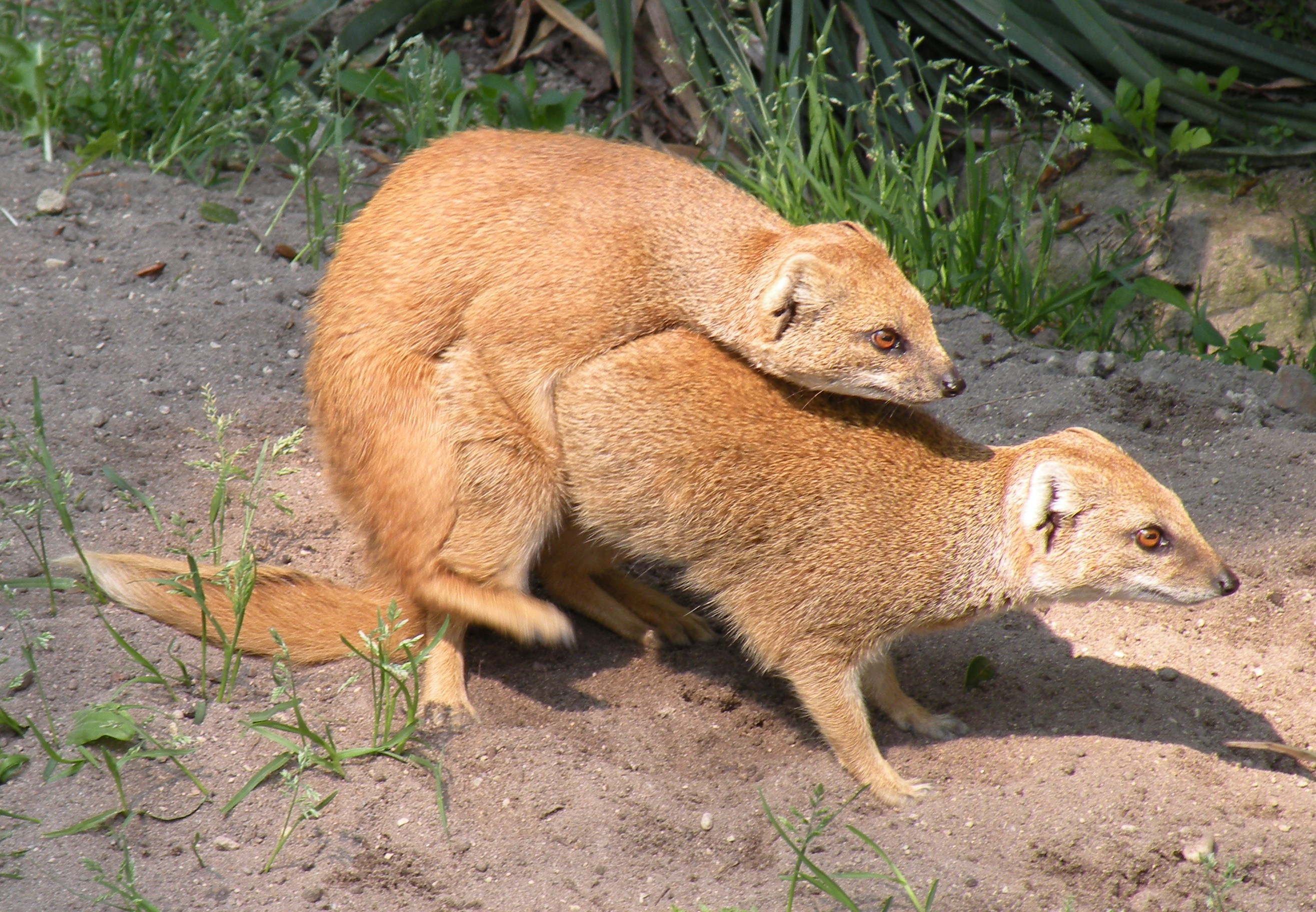
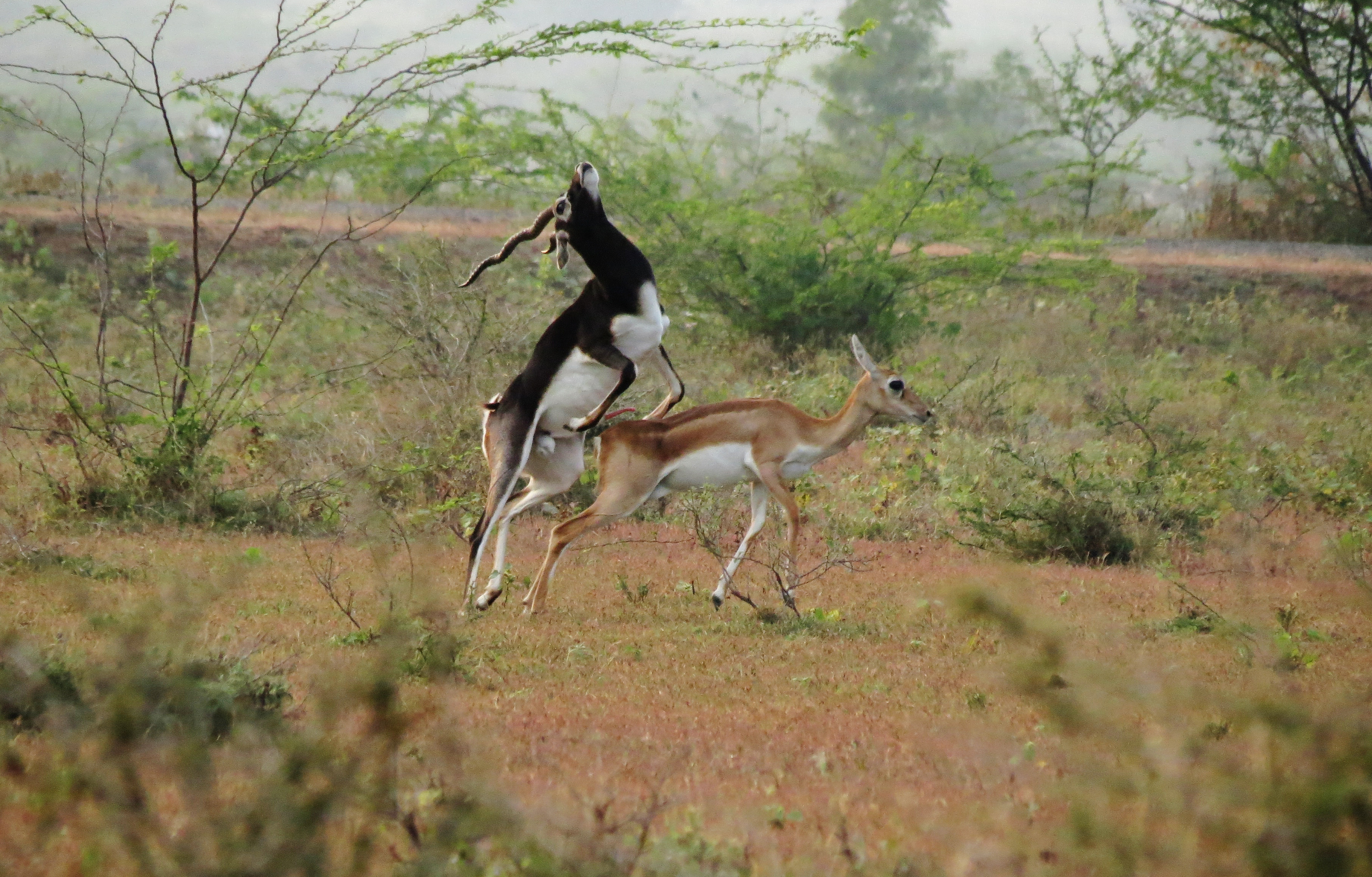
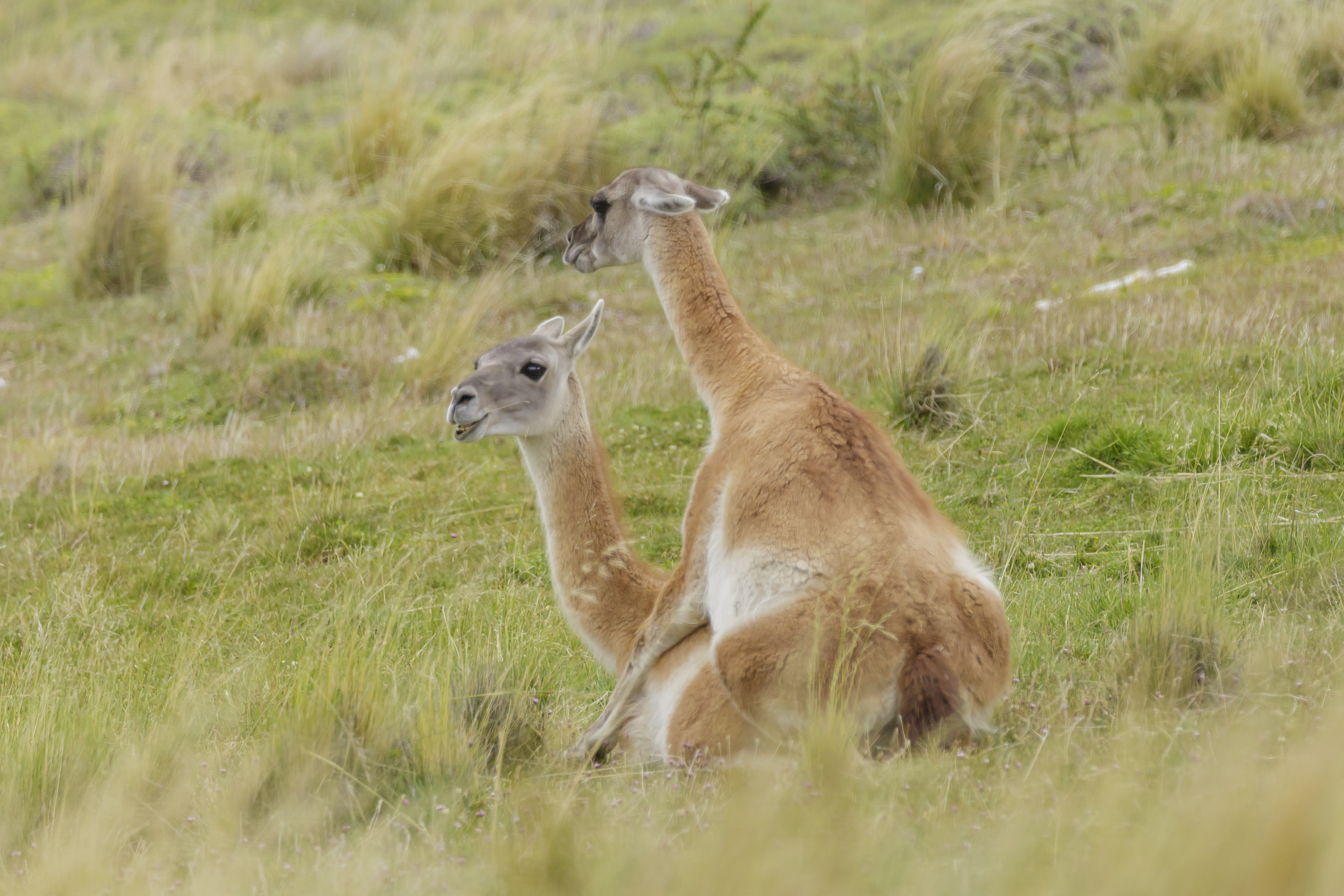
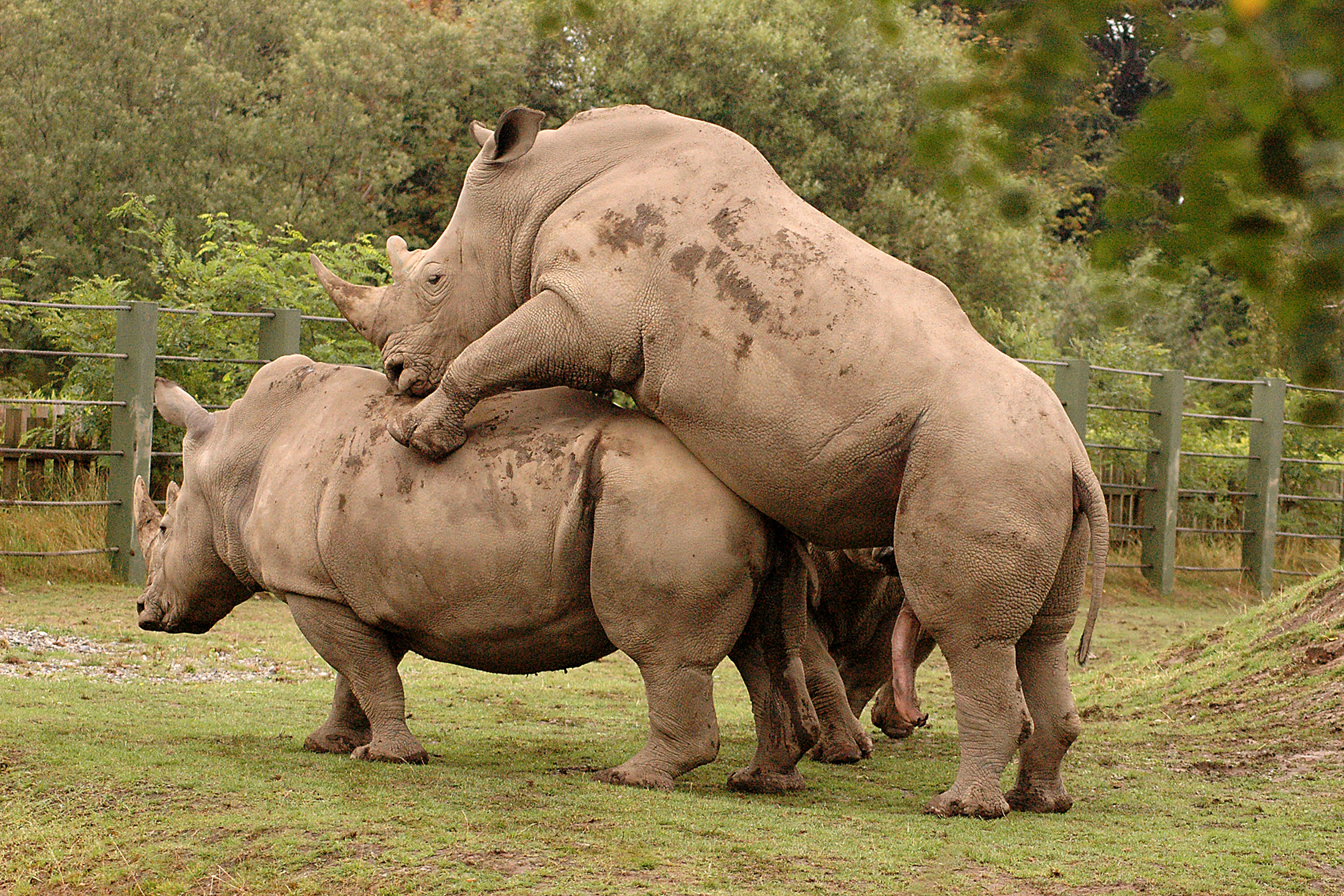
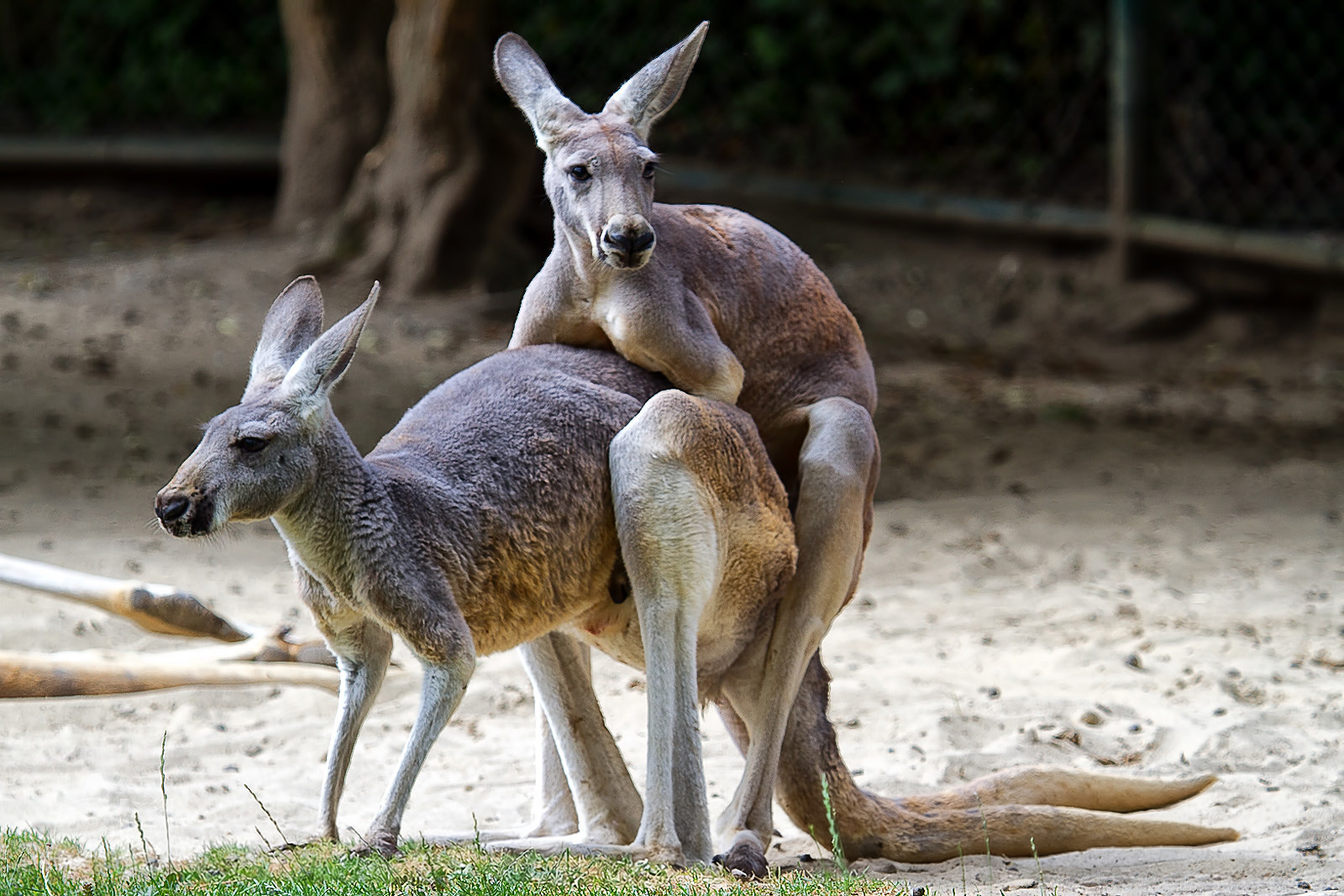
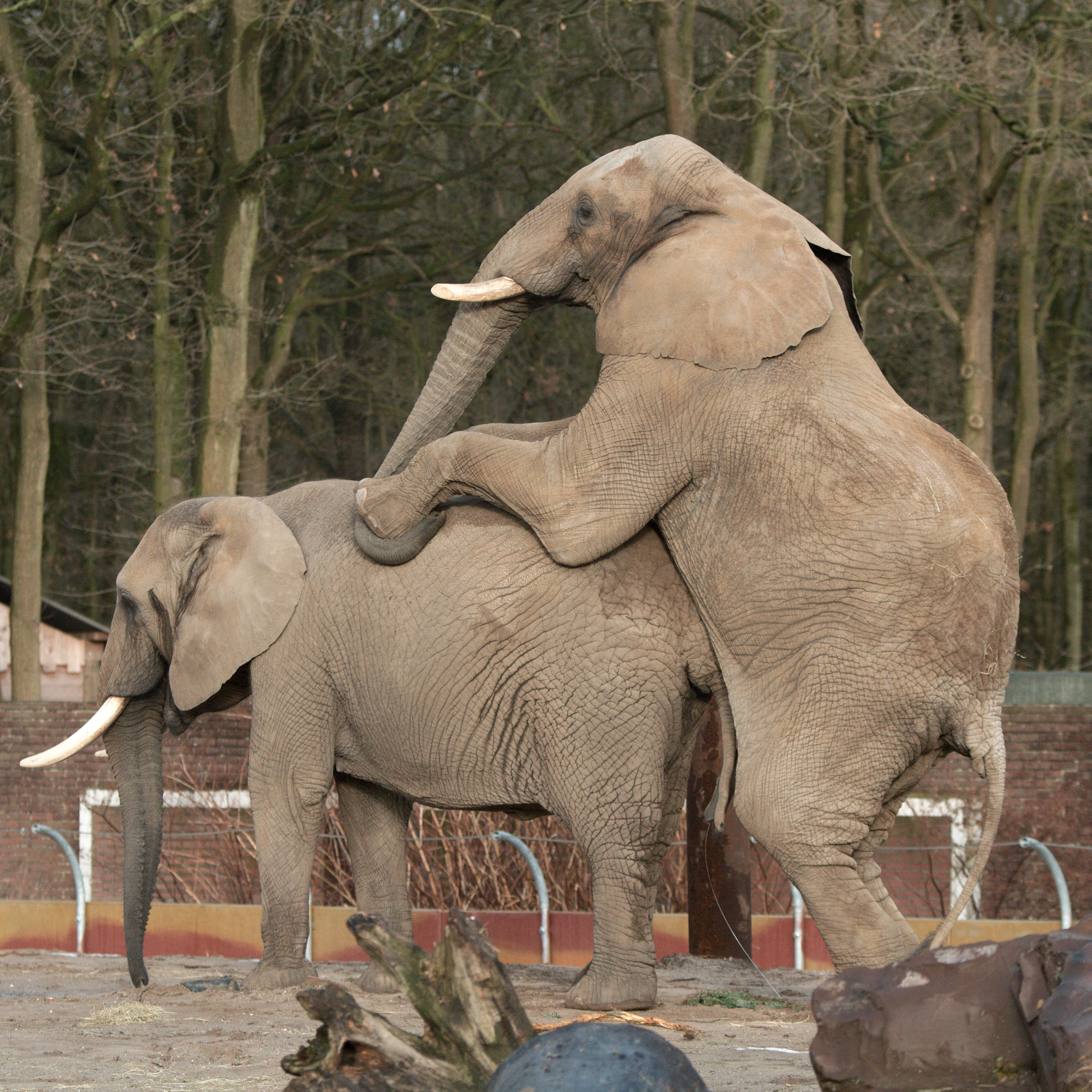
Mating postures of mammals

Sexual behavior can be classified into behavioral states associated with reward motivation ("wanting"), reward consummation also known as pleasure ("liking"), and satiety ("inhibition"); these behavioral states are regulated in mammals by reward-based sexual learning, fluctuations in various neurochemicals (i.e., dopamine − sexual desire also known as "wanting"; norepinephrine − sexual arousal; oxytocin and melanocortins − sexual attraction), and gonadal hormone cycles and further influenced by sex pheromones and motor reflexes (i.e., lordosis behavior) in some mammals.

These behavioral states correlate with the phases of the human sexual response cycle: motivation − excitement; consummation − plateau and orgasm; satiety − refraction. Sexual learning (a form of associative learning) occurs when an animal starts to associate bodily features, personality, contextual cues, and other stimuli with genitally-induced sexual pleasure. Once formed, these associations in turn impinge upon both sexual wanting and sexual liking.

In most female mammals, the act of copulation is controlled by several innate neurobiological processes, including the motor sexual reflex of lordosis. In males, the act of copulation is more complex, because some learning is necessary, but the innate processes (retrocontrol of penis intromission in the vagina, rhythmic movement of the pelvis, detection of female pheromones) are specific to copulation. These innate processes direct heterosexual copulation. Female lordosis behavior became secondary in Hominidae and is non-functional in humans. Mammals usually copulate in a dorso-ventral posture, although some primate species copulate in a ventro-vental posture.

The duration of copulation varies significantly between mammal species, and may be correlated with body mass, lasting longer in large mammals than in small mammals. The duration of copulation may also be correlated with the length of the baculum in mammals.

Male mammals ejaculate semen through the penis into the female reproductive tract during copulation. Ejaculation usually occurs after only one intromission in humans, canids, and ungulates, but occurs after multiple intromissions in most mammal species.

Copulation can induce ovulation in mammal species that do not ovulate spontaneously.

== See also ==
- Mammal reproductive system
- Evolution of descended testes in mammals
- Sexual reproduction § Mammals
- Sex organ § Mammals
- Human reproduction
- Animal sexual behaviour § Mammals
- Pregnancy (mammals)
- Equine reproductive system
- Carnivora § Reproductive system
- Canine reproduction
- Dolphin § Reproduction and sexuality
- Llama § Reproduction
- Domestic sheep reproduction
