= Puggle (disambiguation) =

Puggle is a crossbreed between a pug and a beagle.

Puggle may also refer to:

- The name given to a juvenile echidna or platypus, specifically, the period between hatching and weaning
- A member of the Awana organization in the two- to three-year-old age group

== See also ==
- The Puggle Tales, a series of books by A. A. Barber of The Lost Forests
- Peggle
